= Decentralized Administration of Thessaly and Central Greece =

- Αποκεντρωμένη Διοίκηση; Θεσσαλίας – Στερεάς Ελλάδας

Agency overview
- Formed: 1 January 2011
- Jurisdiction: Government of Greece
- Headquarters: Larissa, Thessaly
- Agency executive: Eirini "Rena" Karalariotou, Secretary-General
- Website: www.apdthest.gov.gr

Map
- Location of Thessaly and Central Greece in Greece

Area served
- Supervised regions: Thessaly, Central Greece
- Regional units: 10
- Municipalities: 50
- Area: 29,586 km^{2} (11,423 sq mi)
- Population: 1,280,152 (as of 2011)

The Decentralized Administration of Thessaly and Central Greece (Greek: Αποκεντρωμένη Διοίκηση Θεσσαλίας – Στερεάς Ελλάδας) is one of the seven decentralized administrations of Greece, consisting of the peripheries of Thessaly and Central Greece. Seated in Larissa, Thessaly, it is currently led by Secretary-General Rena Karalariotou.

== Formation and tasks ==
Decentralized Administrations were created in January 2011 as part of a far-reaching reform of the country's administrative structure, the Kallikratis reform (Law 3852/2010).

They enjoy both administrative and financial autonomy and exercise devolved state powers in urban planning, environmental and energy policy, forestry, migration and citizenship. Beyond that, they are tasked with supervising the first and second-level self-governing bodies: the municipalities and regions, in this case the 50 municipalities of Thessaly and Central Greece, and the two regions themselves.

== Characteristics ==
Covering an area of 29,586 km^{2} (11,423 sq mi), Epirus and Western Macedonia is one of the largest of the seven decentralized administrations, second only to the Decentralized Administration of Macedonia and Thrace. With an overall population of 1,280,152, it is however only medium-sized by population.

In the revised European NUTS nomenclature, the regions of Thessaly and Central Greece together with the three regions of the Decentralized Administration of Peloponnese, Western Greece and the Ionian form the first level NUTS region EL6 (Kentriki Ellada).

== Secretary-General ==
The Decentralized Administration is led by a Secretary-General (Γενικός Γραμματέας) who is appointed or dismissed by a Cabinet decision upon request of the Greek Minister of Interior, and is therefore considered the senior representative of the national government in the regions.

Following the electoral victory of Syriza in January 2015, the new Minister for the Interior, Nikos Voutsis, declared that the decentralized administrations would be abolished, and their powers transferred to the regions. Until this reform is formalized, and as the Secretaries-General appointed by the previous administration resigned on 2 February, the decentralized administrations are run by their senior civil servants as Acting Secretaries-General.

Current Secretary-General is Rena Karalariotou.

== Literature ==
- Ministry of Interior (January 2013). "Structure and operation of local and regional democracy". Council of Europe.
