= Central Greece =

Central Greece may refer to:

- Central Greece (administrative region), a modern administrative region of Greece (περιφέρεια) established in 1987, with Lamia as its capital city
- Central Greece (geographic region), a traditional geographic region of Greece (γεωγραφικό διαμέρισμα), comprising all of the modern administrative region of Central Greece, most of the Attica region, and much of Western Greece
- Kentriki Ellada, a NUTS statistical region of Greece (not used for administrative purposes), comprising all of the Central Greece administrate region, Thessaly, Western Greece and the Peloponnese
