= Decentralized Administration of Peloponnese, Western Greece and the Ionian =

Administrative division in Greece

- Αποκεντρωμένη Διοίκηση; Πελοποννήσου, Δυτικής Ελλάδας και Ιονίου

Agency overview
- Formed: 1 January 2011
- Jurisdiction: Government of Greece
- Headquarters: Patras, Western Greece
- Agency executive: Dionysios Panagiotopoulos, Acting Secretary-General
- Website: www.apd-depin.gov.gr

Map
- Location of Peloponnese, Western Greece and the Ionian in Greece

Area served
- Supervised regions: Peloponnese, Western Greece, Ionian Islands
- Regional units: 13
- Municipalities: 52
- Area: 28,847 km^{2} (11,138 sq mi)
- Population: 1,465,554 (as of 2011)

The Decentralized Administration of Peloponnese, Western Greece and the Ionian (Greek: Αποκεντρωμένη Διοίκηση Πελοποννήσου, Δυτικής Ελλάδας και Ιονίου, romanized: Apokentroméni Dioíkisi Peloponnísou, Dytikís Elládas kai Ioníou) is one of the seven decentralized administrations of Greece, consisting of the regions of Peloponnese, Western Greece and the Ionian Islands. Its seat is in Patras, Western Greece, and it is currently headed by Acting Secretary-General Dionysios Panagiotopoulos.

== Formation and tasks ==
Decentralized Administrations were created in January 2011 as part of a far-reaching reform of the country's administrative structure, the Kallikratis reform (Law 3852/2010).

They enjoy both administrative and financial autonomy and exercise devolved state powers in urban planning, environmental and energy policy, forestry, migration and citizenship. Beyond that, they are tasked with supervising the first and second-level self-governing bodies: the municipalities and regions, in this case the 52 municipalities of Peloponnese, Western Greece and the Ionian Islands, and the three regions themselves.

== Characteristics ==
Covering an area of 28,847 km^{2} (11,138 sq mi) with an overall population of 1,465,554 Peloponnese, Western Greece and the Ionian is the third largest of the seven decentralized administrations both in area and population, and it is the only one that covers three Regions.

In the revised European NUTS nomenclature, the regions of Peloponnese, Western Greece and the Ionian together with the two regions of the Decentralized Administration of Thessaly and Central Greece form the first level NUTS region EL6 (Kentriki Ellada).

== Secretary-General ==
The Decentralized Administration is led by a Secretary-General (Γενικός Γραμματέας) who is appointed or dismissed by a Cabinet decision upon request of the Greek Minister of Interior, and is therefore considered the senior representative of the national government in the regions.

Following the electoral victory of Syriza in January 2015, the new Minister for the Interior, Nikos Voutsis, declared that the decentralized administrations would be abolished, and their powers transferred to the regions. Until this reform is formalized, and as the Secretaries-General appointed by the previous administration resigned on 2 February, the decentralized administrations are run by their senior civil servants as Acting Secretaries-General.

Current Acting Secretary-General is Dionysios Panagiotopoulos.

== Literature ==
- Ministry of Interior (January 2013). "Structure and operation of local and regional democracy". Council of Europe.
