= Papparousi =

Papparousi Παππαρούσι
- Community
- Location within Greece
- Coordinates: 38°55′N 21°41′E
- Country: Greece
- Administrative region: Central Greece
- Regional unit: Evrytania
- Municipality: Karpenisi
- Municipal unit: Karpenisi

Population (2021)
  - Community: 54
- Time zone: UTC+2 (EET)
  - Summer (DST): UTC+3 (EEST)

Papparousi (Greek: Παππαρούσι) is a small village in Evrytania, Greece. It is part of the municipality of Karpenisi. The name Papparousi came from a priest that lived there and his last name was Roussos. There are two parts of the village: Dytiko Papparousi, and Papparousi. The population of the village is 54 (2021 census).
