= Ampliani =

Greek village in Evrytania prefecture

Ampliani Άμπλιανη
- Village
- Location in Greece
- Coordinates: 38°45′23″N 21°54′26″E
- Country: Greece
- Prefecture: Evrytania
- Municipality: Karpenissiou
- Community: Domnistas

Area
  - Total: 37,580 km^{2} (14,510 sq mi)
- Elevation: 1,220 m (4,000 ft)

Population (2021)
  - Total: 76 (Resident population)
  - Density: 0.0020/km^{2} (0.0052/sq mi)
- Time zone: UTC+2
  - Summer (DST): UTC+3
- Postal Code: 360 76
- Telephone Code: 22370

Ampliani is a settlement in the Prefecture of Evrytania.

== Name ==
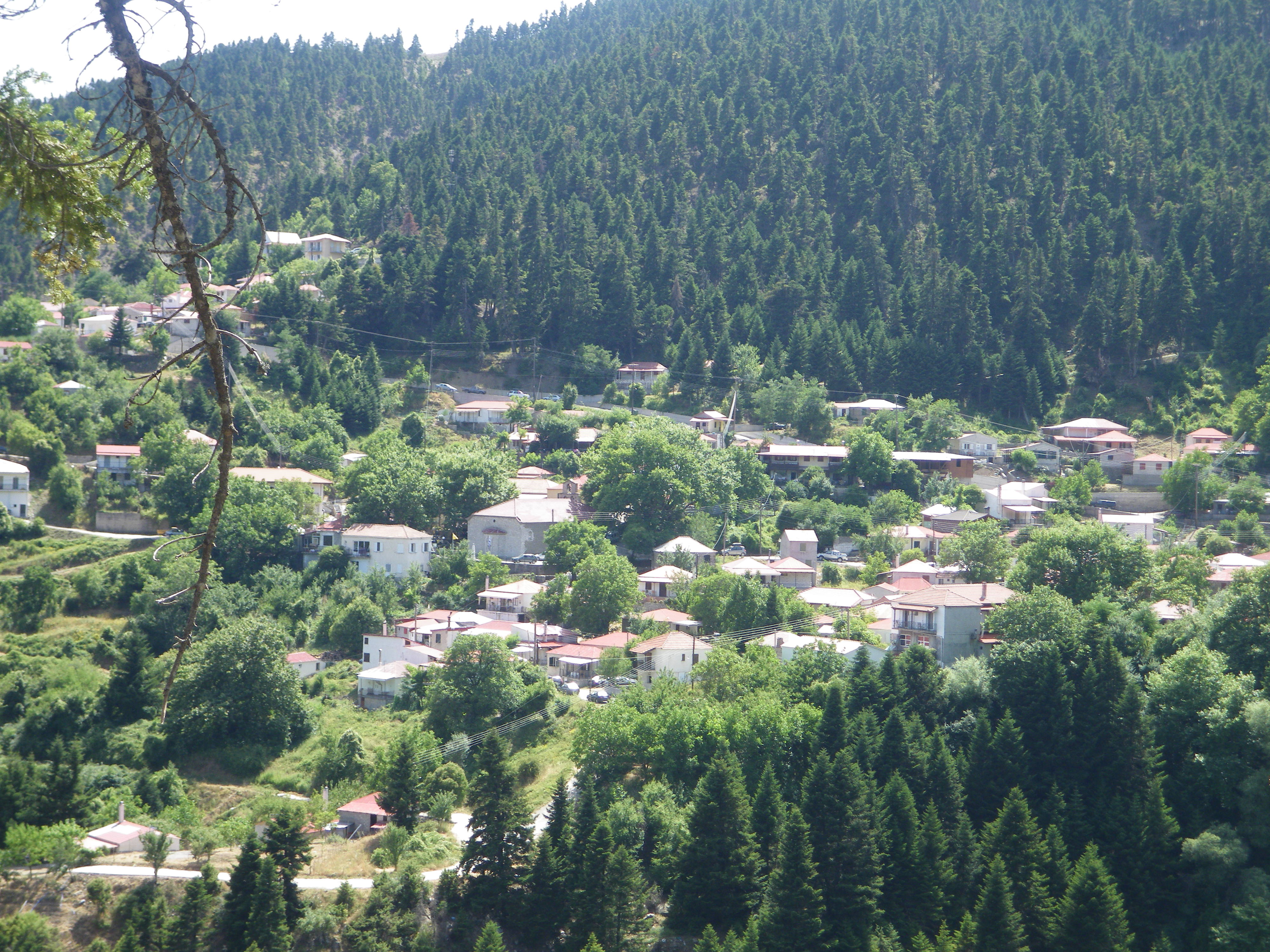
Picture of Ampliani village

In 1928, it was renamed Stavropigio, while in 1984, it was once again renamed to Ampliani.

== Location ==
It is 62 km from Karpenisi. It is located in the south of the prefecture and is built at an altitude of 1,220 meters. It belongs to the Kallikratian Municipality of Karpenisi (formerly the Kapodistrian Municipality of Domnista) and is approximately 31 kilometers from Krikello. Ampliani is the seat of the local community, which is characterized as a rural mountainous settlement, with an area of 37,580 km² (2011).

== History ==
The toponym "Stavropegio" refers to a Stavropegian monastery, which existed in the area during Byzantine times. Its current name "Ampliani" originates from Greek and is due to the many amblades (small springs with a lot of water) in the area.

Before the Revolution of 1821, Ampliani was the largest settlement in Evrytania after Karpenisi. During the German occupation of Greece in World War Two, the inhabitants of the village actively participated in the Resistance, but were not harshly punished by the Germans. However, during the Greek Civil War (1946-1949), the village was burned.

Its population, according to the 2021 census, amounts to 76 residents, and most of the population are shepherds.

== Population ==
Resident population
Year	Population
1991	46
2001	3
2011	13
2021	76

Overall population
Year	Population
1961	9
1971	8
1981	216
1991	187
2001	255
2011	195

== Transportation ==
The main way to reach Ampliani is by car, with no public transportation in the village, due to the mountainous terrain. The nearest city is Lamia and Agrinio, and the village is between an hour and one and a half hours off the E952 road, which goes from Lamia to Agrinio.

== Village life and attractions ==
Ampliani is known for its woven fabrics and the traditional costumes of its women.

Notable is the traditional dance "Stegos", which is danced in the village on the eve of the festival of Agia Paraskevi (July 26). Also worth seeing are the churches located in and around Ampliani, the most important of which are Agia Paraskevi (1867), Agios Nikolaos, Agia Sotira (in the cemetery), Agios Ioannis and the prophet Elias.

== Bibliography ==
- Collective work, 2006, Prefecture of Evrytania, volume 13, series GREECE, Athens, Domisi Publications
- Alexandropoulou Spyridoula K., Ampliani in the Interwar Period, Athens 2008

== See also ==
- Karpenisi
- Evrytania
