= Kalesmeno =

Kalesmeno Καλεσμένο
- Community
- Location within Greece
- Coordinates: 38°54′N 21°43′E
- Country: Greece
- Administrative region: Central Greece
- Regional unit: Evrytania
- Municipality: Karpenisi
- Municipal unit: Karpenisi

Population (2021)
  - Community: 101
- Time zone: UTC+2 (EET)
  - Summer (DST): UTC+3 (EEST)

Kalesmeno is a community within the municipality of Karpenisi in Greece. In 2021 its population was 101.
