= Domnista =

Domnista Δομνίστα
- Municipal unit
- Location within the regional unit

- Location within Greece
- Coordinates: 38°46′N 21°52′E
- Country: Greece
- Administrative region: Central Greece
- Regional unit: Evrytania
- Municipality: Karpenisi

Area
  - Municipal unit: 215.755 km^{2} (83.303 sq mi)

Population (2021)
  - Municipal unit: 698
  - Municipal unit density: 3.24/km^{2} (8.38/sq mi)
  - Community: 230
- Time zone: UTC+2 (EET)
  - Summer (DST): UTC+3 (EEST)
- Vehicle registration: ΚΗ

Domnista (Greek: Δομνίστα) is a village and a former municipality in Evrytania, Greece. Since the 2011 local government reform, it is part of the municipality Karpenisi, of which it is a municipal unit. The municipal unit has an area of 215.755 km^{2}. Population 698 (2021). The seat of the municipality was in Krikello.

== See also ==
- Greek Resistance
- ELAS
- Aris Velouchiotis
