= Prousos =

Prousos Προυσός
- Municipal unit
- Prousos

- Location within Greece
- Coordinates: 38°45′N 21°40′E
- Country: Greece
- Administrative region: Central Greece
- Regional unit: Evrytania
- Municipality: Karpenisi

Area
  - Municipal unit: 146.68 km^{2} (56.63 sq mi)

Population (2021)
  - Municipal unit: 945
  - Municipal unit density: 6.44/km^{2} (16.7/sq mi)
  - Community: 227
- Time zone: UTC+2 (EET)
  - Summer (DST): UTC+3 (EEST)
- Vehicle registration: ΚΗ

Prousos (Greek: Προυσός) is a village and a former municipality in Evrytania, Greece. Since the 2011 local government reform it is part of the municipality Karpenisi, of which it is a municipal unit. The municipal unit has an area of 146.680 km^{2}. Population 945 (2021).
