= Northern Greece =

NUTS Region of Greece

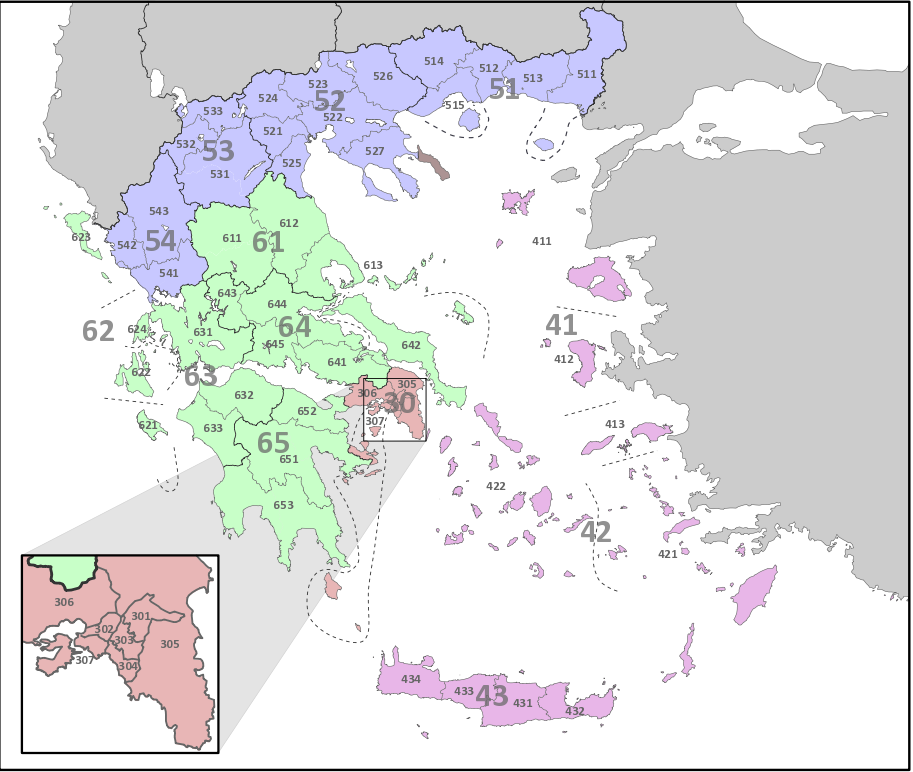
- First-level NUTS regions of Greece as of January 2015: EL3: Attiki EL4: Nisia Aigaiou, Kriti EL5: Voreia Ellada EL6: Kentriki Ellada

Population (2011)
  - Total: 3,590,187

Northern Greece (Greek: Βόρεια Ελλάδα, romanized: Voreia Ellada) is used to refer to the northern parts of Greece, and can have various definitions.

== Administrative term ==
The term "Northern Greece" is widely used to refer mainly to the two northern regions of Macedonia and (Western) Thrace; thus the Thessaloniki-based Ministry of Macedonia and Thrace was known as the Ministry of Northern Greece, and previously as the Governorate-General of Northern Greece (Γενική Διοίκηση Βορείου Ελλάδος), until 1988.

== Broader term and NUTS usage ==
The term Lower Greece was mentioned in 16th century western correspondence when the region was under Ottoman rule, it included Northern Epirus and Western Macedonia.

The term Northern Greece may also, according to context, incorporate the region of Epirus. When Epirus is included, it is broadly coterminous with the "New Lands" (Νέες Χώρες), i.e. the territories added to the Kingdom of Greece after the Balkan Wars of 1912–13, as opposed to pre-1912 "Old Greece" (Παλαιά Ελλάδα). This distinction survives in the ecclesiastical domain, where the dioceses of the "New Lands" de jure still adhere to the Patriarchate of Constantinople, but are de facto under the Church of Greece.

Voreia Ellada is also one of the four Greek NUTS regions, created for statistical purposes by the European Union. Until 2014, it encompassed the four administrative regions Eastern Macedonia and Thrace, Central Macedonia, Western Macedonia and Thessaly. Coming into effect in January 2015, the Greek NUTS regions were redefined, with Voreia Ellada now encompassing Epirus instead of Thessaly. This NUTS division is not used by Greece for any administrative purposes.

== Linguistics ==
In linguistics, Northern Greece refers to the areas where the Northern Greek dialect is traditionally spoken, encompassing in addition to the previous regions Central Greece except for Attica, and the North Aegean, except Chios.

== Maps ==
Territory evolution of Greece from 1832 to 1947. Land acquired after the Balkan Wars is shown in green (1913), orange (1923) and pink (1947).

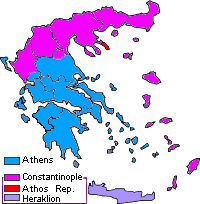
The religious jurisdictions of the Orthodox Church in Greece (in blue). The "New Lands" annexed by Greece after 1913 (in pink, red and purple) remain under the ecclesiastical jurisdiction of the Ecumenical Patriarchate of Constantinople.

Map showing the distribution of major Modern Greek dialect areas. The dialect of Northern Epirus (not listed here) belongs to the southern varieties.

== Northern Greece statistics ==
According to 2011 Eurostat data, Voreia Ellada, as defined until 2014, had a total population of 3,590,187 inhabitants.

Geographic division	Administrative divisions	Population (2011)	Capital	Notes
Macedonia	Western, Central and part of Eastern Macedonia and Thrace	2,487,384	Thessaloniki (Salonica)	It is the second largest geographical division in Greece by population, after Continental Greece. It is always included in Northern Greece.
Thrace	part of Eastern Macedonia and Thrace	367,393	Komotini	It is always included in Northern Greece, as the eastern portion of the region of Eastern Macedonia and Thrace. Modern Greek Orthodox Thracians speak a northern Greek dialect, while the Muslim minority inhabiting the region is divided between the Turkish-speaking Western Thrace Turks and the Bulgarian-speaking Pomaks.
Epirus	Epirus	357,203	Ioannina	It is located in north-western Greece. It is sometimes included in Northern Greece. Epirotes speak a northern dialect.
Thessaly	Thessaly	735,410	Larissa	It is sometimes included in Central Greece. Thessalians speak a northern dialect.
North Aegean	North Aegean	199,603	Mytilene	This region is rarely included in Northern Greece, as it is mainly included in the Aegean Islands region. Most people from these islands speak a northern as well as an eastern dialect. That is why they have been historically connected to other Eastern Greeks ("Asia Minor Greeks" or "Mikrasiates") from Asia Minor, along with the Dodecanesian islanders, who speak an eastern dialect.
Wider sense of Northern Greece		4,146,993	Thessaloniki (largest city)	3,947,390 inhabitants without North Aegean islands. Northern Greece in the strict sense (Macedonia, Thrace) includes 2,854,777 inhabitants.
