= NUTS statistical regions of Greece =

Overview of Greek NUTS statistical regions

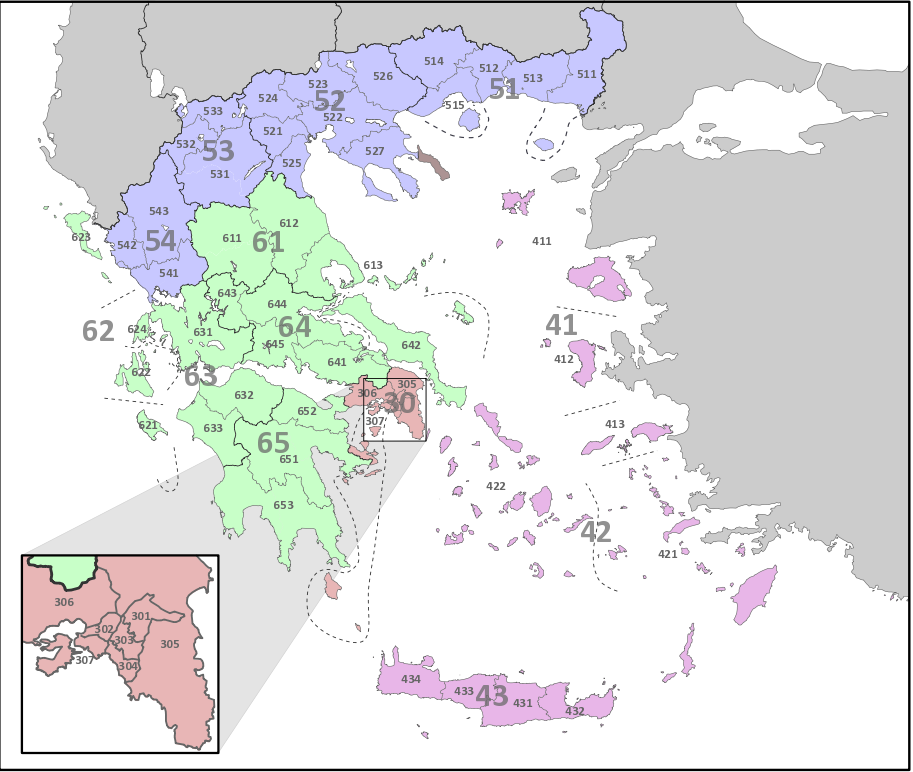
First-level NUTS regions of Greece: EL3: Attiki EL4: Nisia Aigaiou, Kriti EL5: Voreia Ellada EL6: Kentriki Ellada

The NUTS codes of Greece are part of the Nomenclature of Territorial Units for Statistics, an official nomenclature of the European Commission used by Eurostat for statistical purposes.

== Changes ==
In 2011, the NUTS1 code of Greece was changed from GR to EL. GR1 was changed to EL5, GR2 to EL6, GR3 to EL3 and GR4 to EL4. The change became official per European Commission regulation No. 31/2011. With regard to the transmission of data to Eurostat, the new codes entered into force by 1 January 2012.

Following the Kallikratis territorial reform, the NUTS regions of Greece were redefined. With the region of Epirus being reclassified as part of Voreia Ellada ("Northern Greece", former EL1), and the region of Thessaly in exchange going to Kentriki Ellada ("Central Greece", former EL2), new NUTS1 codes have been assigned to both regions. Apart from that, a number of third-level divisions have been changed. The changes became official in December 2013 by European Commission regulation No. 1319/2013. With regard to the transmission of data to Eurostat, the new codes entered into force on 1 January 2015.

== NUTS levels ==
The three NUTS levels are as follows:

Level	Subdivisions	#
NUTS 1	Groups of development regions	4
NUTS 2	Regions (Perifereies)	13
NUTS 3	Regional units or combinations thereof, sometimes equivalent to former Prefectures (Nomoi)	52

== NUTS codes ==
Per 1 January 2015, the NUTS codes for Greece are as follows:

NUTS 1	Code	NUTS 2	Code	NUTS 3	Code
Attiki	EL3	Attica	EL30	Northern Athens	EL301
Attiki	EL3	Attica	EL30	Western Athens	EL302
Attiki	EL3	Attica	EL30	Central Athens	EL303
Attiki	EL3	Attica	EL30	Southern Athens	EL304
Attiki	EL3	Attica	EL30	Eastern Attica	EL305
Attiki	EL3	Attica	EL30	Western Attica	EL306
Attiki	EL3	Attica	EL30	Piraeus, Islands	EL307
Nisia Aigaiou, Kriti	EL4	North Aegean	EL41	Lesbos, Lemnos	EL411
Nisia Aigaiou, Kriti	EL4	North Aegean	EL41	Ikaria, Samos	EL412
Nisia Aigaiou, Kriti	EL4	North Aegean	EL41	Chios	EL413
Nisia Aigaiou, Kriti	EL4	South Aegean	EL42	Kalymnos, Karpathos, Kos, Rhodes (former (Dodekanisos Prefecture)	EL421
Nisia Aigaiou, Kriti	EL4	South Aegean	EL42	Andros, Thira, Kea-Kythnos, Milos, Mykonos, Naxos, Paros, Syros, Tinos (former (Kyklades Prefecture)	EL422
Nisia Aigaiou, Kriti	EL4	Crete	EL43	Heraklion	EL431
Nisia Aigaiou, Kriti	EL4	Crete	EL43	Lasithi	EL432
Nisia Aigaiou, Kriti	EL4	Crete	EL43	Rethymno	EL433
Nisia Aigaiou, Kriti	EL4	Crete	EL43	Chania	EL434
Voreia Ellada	EL5	Eastern Macedonia and Thrace	EL51	Evros	EL511
Voreia Ellada	EL5	Eastern Macedonia and Thrace	EL51	Xanthi	EL512
Voreia Ellada	EL5	Eastern Macedonia and Thrace	EL51	Rhodope	EL513
Voreia Ellada	EL5	Eastern Macedonia and Thrace	EL51	Drama	EL514
Voreia Ellada	EL5	Eastern Macedonia and Thrace	EL51	Thasos, Kavala	EL515
Voreia Ellada	EL5	Central Macedonia	EL52	Imathia	EL521
Voreia Ellada	EL5	Central Macedonia	EL52	Thessaloniki	EL522
Voreia Ellada	EL5	Central Macedonia	EL52	Kilkis	EL523
Voreia Ellada	EL5	Central Macedonia	EL52	Pella	EL524
Voreia Ellada	EL5	Central Macedonia	EL52	Pieria	EL525
Voreia Ellada	EL5	Central Macedonia	EL52	Serres	EL526
Voreia Ellada	EL5	Central Macedonia	EL52	Chalkidiki	EL527
Voreia Ellada	EL5	Western Macedonia	EL53	Grevena, Kozani	EL531
Voreia Ellada	EL5	Western Macedonia	EL53	Kastoria	EL532
Voreia Ellada	EL5	Western Macedonia	EL53	Florina	EL533
Voreia Ellada	EL5	Epirus	EL54	Arta, Preveza	EL541
Voreia Ellada	EL5	Epirus	EL54	Thesprotia	EL542
Voreia Ellada	EL5	Epirus	EL54	Ioannina	EL543
Kentriki Ellada	EL6	Thessaly	EL61	Karditsa, Trikala	EL611
Kentriki Ellada	EL6	Thessaly	EL61	Larissa	EL612
Kentriki Ellada	EL6	Thessaly	EL61	Magnesia, Sporades	EL613
Kentriki Ellada	EL6	Ionian Islands	EL62	Zakynthos	EL621
Kentriki Ellada	EL6	Ionian Islands	EL62	Corfu	EL622
Kentriki Ellada	EL6	Ionian Islands	EL62	Ithaca, Cephalonia	EL623
Kentriki Ellada	EL6	Ionian Islands	EL62	Lefkada	EL624
Kentriki Ellada	EL6	Western Greece	EL63	Aetolia-Acarnania	EL631
Kentriki Ellada	EL6	Western Greece	EL63	Achaea	EL632
Kentriki Ellada	EL6	Western Greece	EL63	Elis	EL633
Kentriki Ellada	EL6	Central Greece	EL64	Boeotia	EL641
Kentriki Ellada	EL6	Central Greece	EL64	Euboea	EL642
Kentriki Ellada	EL6	Central Greece	EL64	Evrytania	EL643
Kentriki Ellada	EL6	Central Greece	EL64	Phthiotis	EL644
Kentriki Ellada	EL6	Central Greece	EL64	Phocis	EL645
Kentriki Ellada	EL6	Peloponnese	EL65	Argolis, Arcadia	EL651
Kentriki Ellada	EL6	Peloponnese	EL65	Korinthia	EL652
Kentriki Ellada	EL6	Peloponnese	EL65	Laconia, Messenia	EL653

== Local administrative units ==
Below the NUTS levels, the two LAU (Local Administrative Units) levels are:

Level	Subdivisions	#
LAU 1	Municipalities (Dimoi)	1035
LAU 2	Municipal units, municipal communities, local units	6130

The LAU codes of Greece can be downloaded here:

== See also ==
- Subdivisions of Greece
- ISO 3166-2 codes of Greece
- FIPS region codes of Greece
