= Kentriki Ellada =

NUTS division of Greece

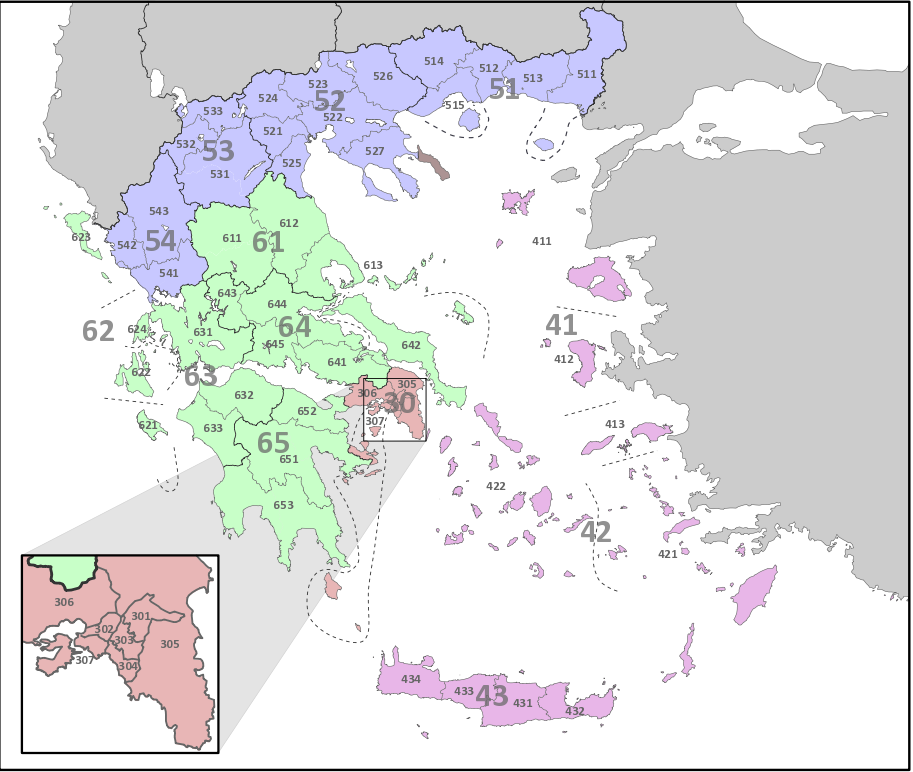
First-level NUTS regions of Greece as of January 2015: EL3: Attiki EL4: Nisia Aigaiou, Kriti EL5: Voreia Ellada EL6: Kentriki Ellada

Kentriki Ellada (Greek: Κεντρική Ελλάδα), meaning Central Greece, is a first level NUTS division of Greece created for statistical purposes by the European Union.

Until 2014, it encompassed the five regions Epirus, Ionian Islands, Western Greece, Central Greece and Peloponnese. Coming into effect in January 2015, the Greek NUTS regions however have been redefined, now encompassing Thessaly instead of Epirus.

This division is not used by Greece for administrative purposes. Central Greece however is the name of both a traditional geographical region and an administrative region of Greece.
