= Voutyro =

Voutyro Βουτύρο
- Community
- Location within Greece
- Coordinates: 38°52′48″N 21°44′38″E
- Country: Greece
- Administrative region: Central Greece
- Regional unit: Evrytania
- Municipality: Karpenisi
- Municipal unit: Karpenisi

Population (2021)
  - Community: 73
- Time zone: UTC+2 (EET)
  - Summer (DST): UTC+3 (EEST)

Voutyro (Greek: Βουτύρο) is a small village located 6 kilometers south-west of Karpenisi, the capital of Evrytania, Greece. Voutyro is situated at an elevation of 820 meters or 2,690 feet.

Voutyro is a traditional village of about 70 residents, part of the municipal unit of Karpenisi. The village is verdurous with fountains of spring mountain water. It is well known for its guest houses and has the largest stone church in the prefecture, Agia Paraskevi (Greek: Αγίας Παρασκευής), began in 1926.
