= Nisia Aigaiou, Kriti =

NUTS division of Greece

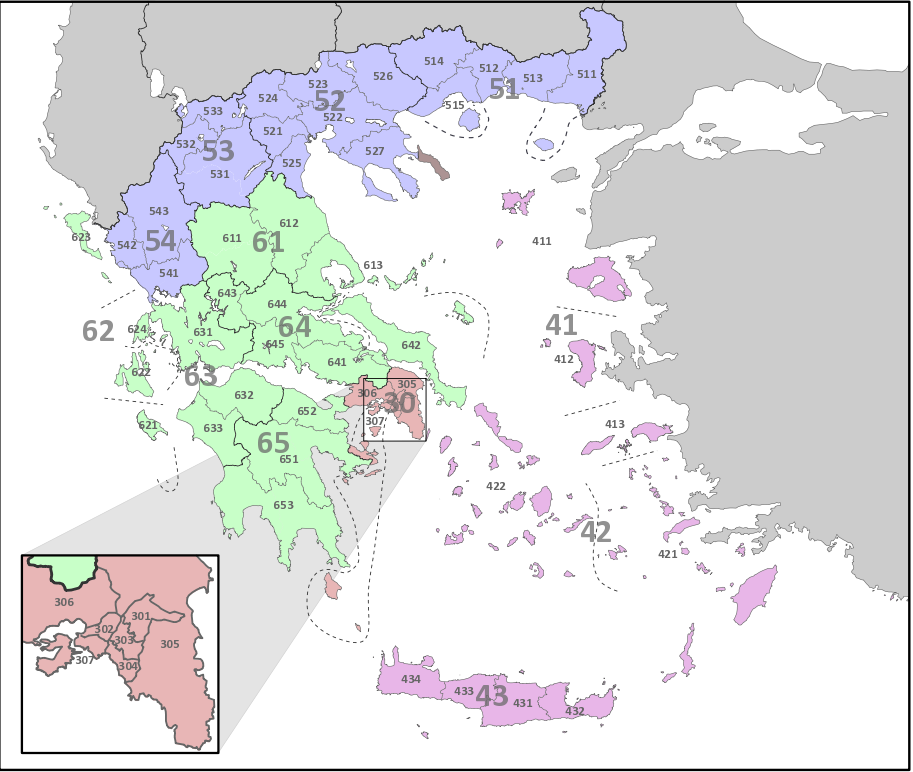
First-level NUTS regions of Greece as of January 2015: EL3: Attiki EL4: Nisia Aigaiou, Kriti EL5: Voreia Ellada EL6: Kentriki Ellada

Nisia Aigaiou, Kriti (Greek: Νησιά Αιγαίου, Κρήτη), meaning "Aegean Islands, Crete", is a first level NUTS administrative division of Greece created for statistical purposes by the European Union. The NUTS division is not used by Greece for any administrative reasons. It contains the three administrative regions of North Aegean, South Aegean, and Crete. As of 1 January 2019 it had a population of 1,200,055 inhabitants.

Per January 2015, the Greek NUTS regions have been redefined. The first-level region of Nisia Aigaiou, Kriti however wasn't changed.
