= Lilantia =

Lilantia Ληλάντια
- Municipal unit
- Location within the regional unit

- Location within Greece
- Coordinates: 38°26′N 23°40′E
- Country: Greece
- Administrative region: Central Greece
- Regional unit: Euboea
- Municipality: Chalcis

Area
  - Municipal unit: 111.446 km^{2} (43.030 sq mi)

Population (2021)
  - Municipal unit: 17,172
  - Municipal unit density: 154.08/km^{2} (399.07/sq mi)
- Time zone: UTC+2 (EET)
  - Summer (DST): UTC+3 (EEST)
- Vehicle registration: ΧΑ

Lilantia (Greek: Ληλάντια) is a former municipality in Euboea, Greece. Since the 2011 local government reform it is part of the municipality Chalcis, of which it is a municipal unit. The municipal unit has an area of 111.446 km^{2}. Population 17,172 (2021). The seat of the municipality was in Vasiliko. The municipality was named after the river Lilas or Lilantas.
