= List of Greek regions by Human Development Index =

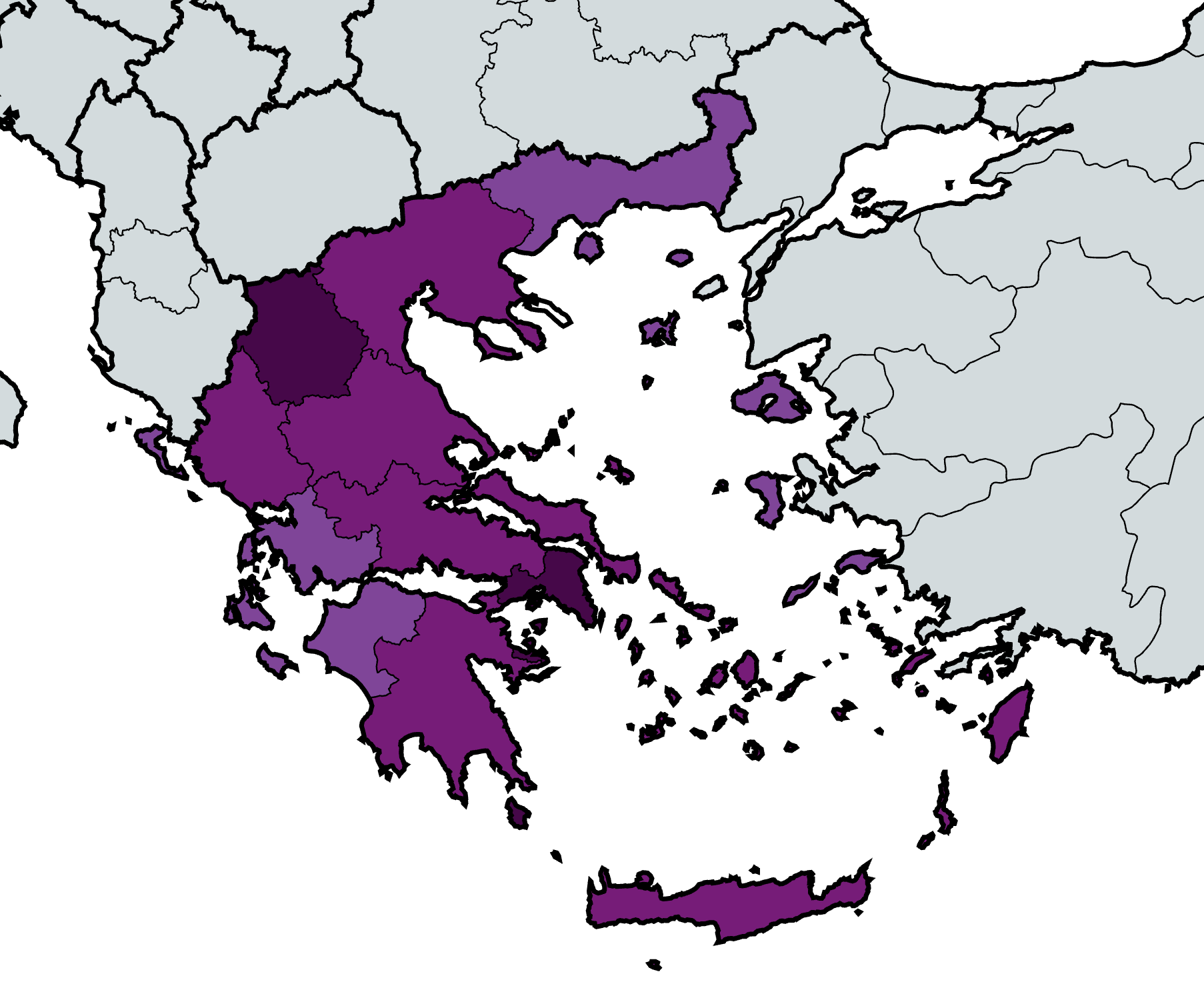
0.900 + 0.890 - 0.900 0.870 - 0.890 Monastic community of Mount Athos

This is a list of the administrative regions of Greece by Human Development Index as of 2025 with data for the year 2023.

Rank	Province	HDI (2023)
Very high human development
1	Attica	0.933
–	Greece (average)	0.908
2	Western Macedonia	0.900
3	Central Greece	0.897
4	Crete	0.896
5	Thessaly	0.894
6	Epirus (region)	0.892
6	Peloponnese	0.892
8	Central Macedonia	0.891
9	South Aegean	0.890
10	Ionian Islands	0.886
11	North Aegean	0.882
12	Western Greece	0.878
13	Eastern Macedonia and Thrace	0.876
