= Vagia =

Vagia Βάγια
- Municipal unit
- Location within the regional unit

- Location within Greece
- Coordinates: 38°19′N 23°11′E
- Country: Greece
- Administrative region: Central Greece
- Regional unit: Boeotia
- Municipality: Thebes

Area
  - Municipal unit: 91.072 km^{2} (35.163 sq mi)
- Elevation: 220 m (720 ft)

Population (2021)
  - Municipal unit: 2,511
  - Municipal unit density: 27.57/km^{2} (71.41/sq mi)
- Time zone: UTC+2 (EET)
  - Summer (DST): UTC+3 (EEST)
- Postal code: 32002
- Website: www.vagia.gr

Vagia (Greek: Βάγια) is a small town and a former municipality in Boeotia, Greece. Since the 2011 local government reform it is part of the municipality Thebes, of which it is a municipal unit. The municipal unit has an area of 91.072 km^{2}.
