= Karpenisi =

Town in Evrytania, Greece

Karpenisi Καρπενήσι
- Municipality
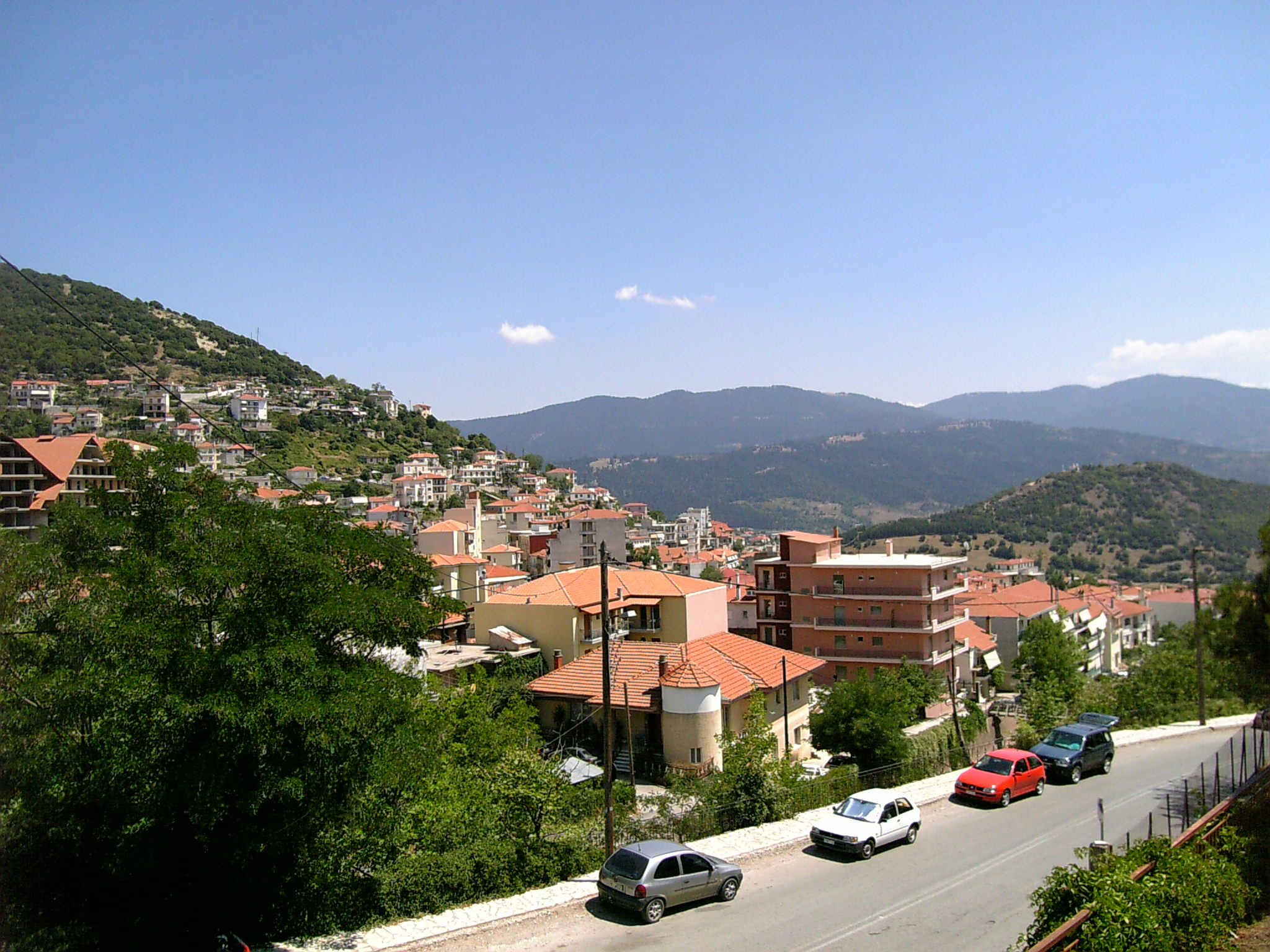
- Part of the town

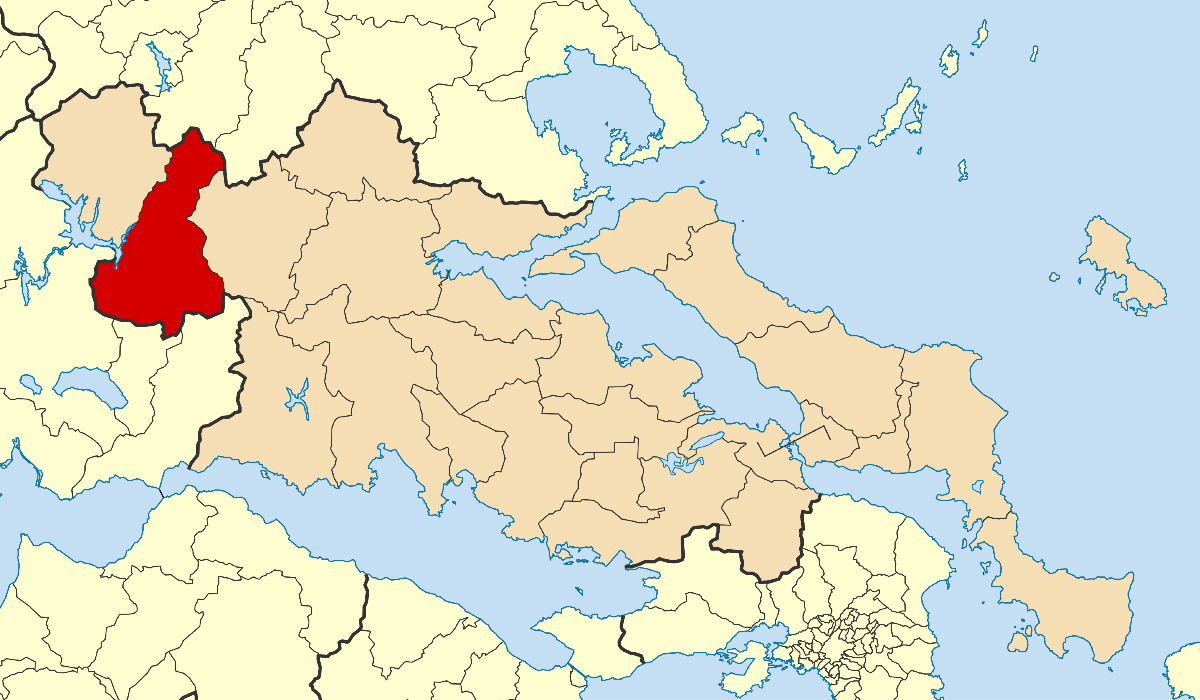

- Location within Greece
- Coordinates: 38°55′N 21°47′E
- Country: Greece
- Administrative region: Central Greece
- Regional unit: Evrytania

Government
  - Mayor: Christos Kakavas (since 2023)

Area
  - Municipality: 948.6 km^{2} (366.3 sq mi)
  - Municipal unit: 250.9 km^{2} (96.9 sq mi)
- Elevation: 960 m (3,150 ft)

Population (2021)
  - Municipality: 11,445
  - Density: 12.07/km^{2} (31.25/sq mi)
  - Municipal unit: 7,921
  - Municipal unit density: 31.57/km^{2} (81.77/sq mi)
  - Community: 6,788
- Time zone: UTC+2 (EET)
  - Summer (DST): UTC+3 (EEST)
- Postal code: 361 00
- Area code: 22370
- Vehicle registration: ΚΗ
- Website: www.karpenissi.gr

Karpenisi (Greek: Καρπενήσι [karpeˈnisi]) is a town in central Greece. It is the capital of the regional unit of Evrytania. Karpenisi lies within the valley of the river Karpenisiotis (Καρπενησιώτης), a tributary of the Megdovas, in the southern part of the Pindus Mountains. Mount Tymfristos (2,315 m elevation) lies directly to the north of the town, and the foothills of mount Kaliakouda are in the south. Karpenisi has a ski resort and is a popular destination, especially during winter.

== Etymology ==
The name Karpenisi derives from the Aromanian word kárpinu 'hornbeam' + the ending -iş. The Greek spelling Καρπενήσι is influenced by folk etymology, the second combining form appearing to be νησί 'island' (pronounced [niˈsi]). The first mention of the name is traced back to an Ottoman tax ledger of 1454–1455.

== Municipality ==
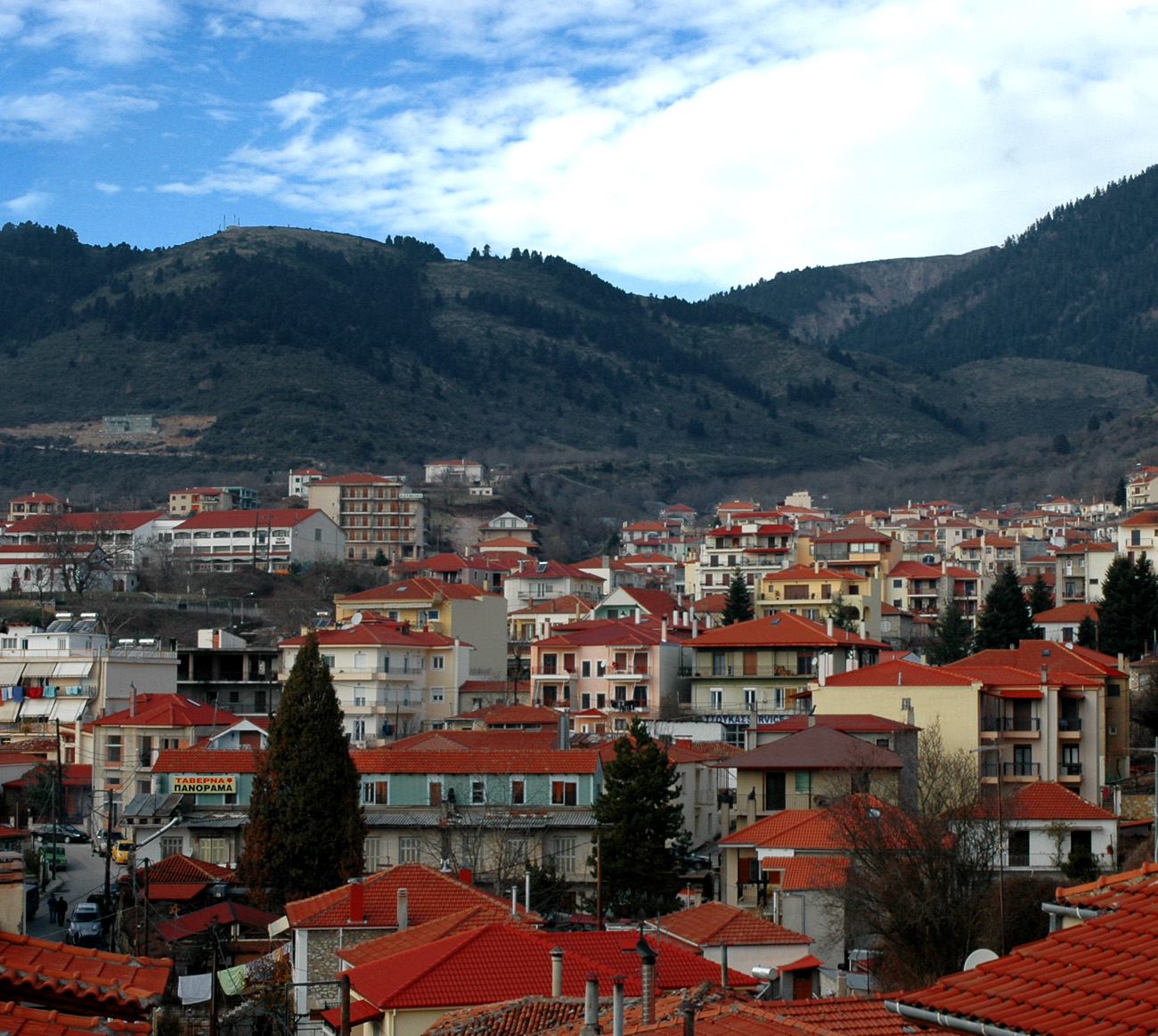
A view of Karpenisi

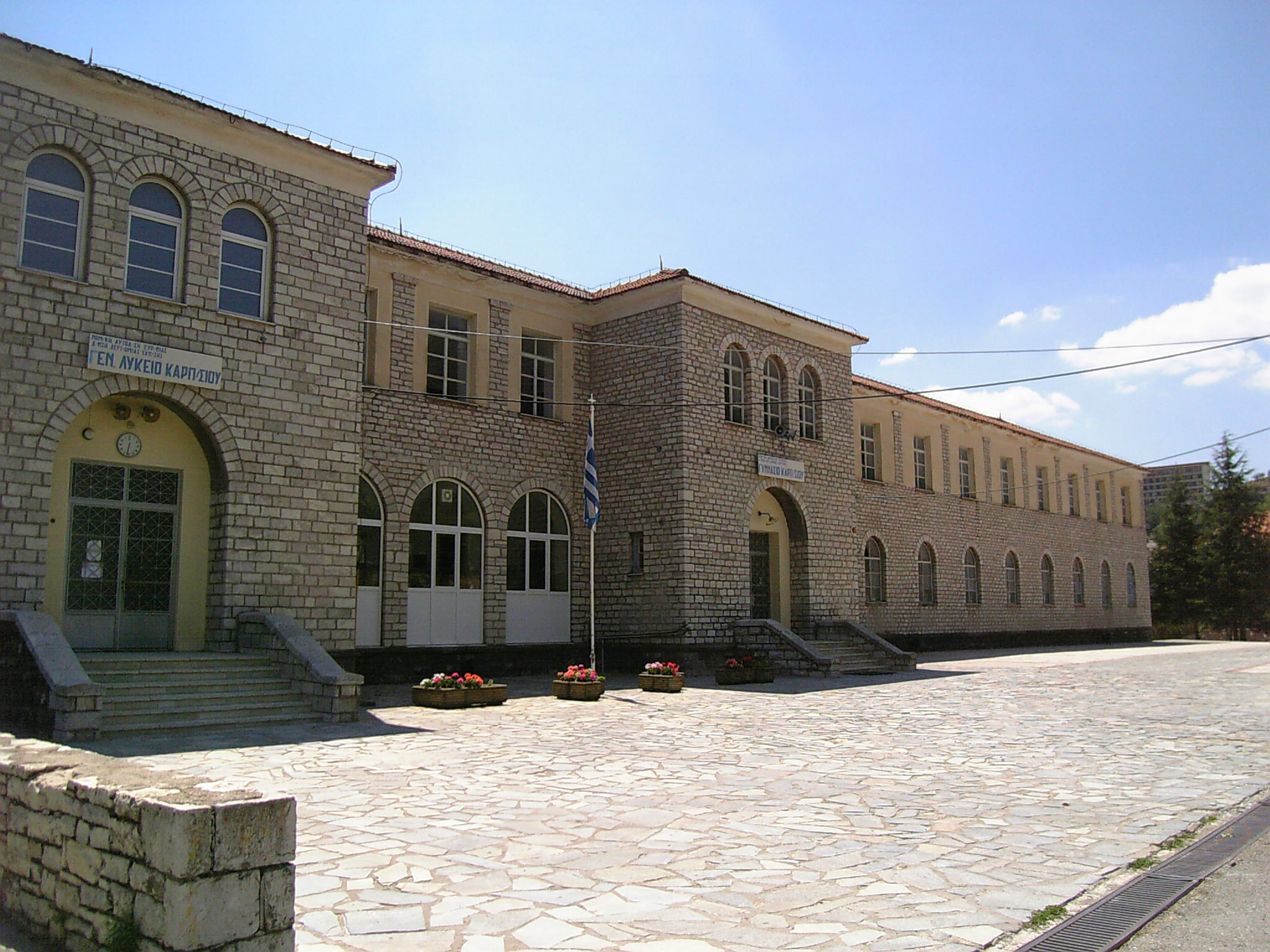
The high school

The municipality Karpenisi was formed during the 2011 local government reform by merging the following six former municipalities, which became municipal units:

- Domnista (Ampliani, Domnista, Krikello, Mesokomi, Psiana, Roska, Stavloi)
- Fourna (Fourna, Kleisto, Vracha)
- Karpenisi (Agia Vlacherna, Agios Andreas, Agios Nikolaos, Fidakia, Kalesmeno, Karpenisi, Koryschades, Myriki, Papparousi, Pavlopoulo, Sella, Stefani, Stenoma, Voutyro)
- Ktimenia (Agia Triada, Agios Charalampos, Chochlia, Domianoi, Petralona)
- Potamia (Aniada, Chelidonas, Dermati, Karitsa, Klafsi, Megalo Chorio, Mikro Chorio, Mouzilo, Nostimo, Sygkrellos)
- Prousos (Alestia, Aspropyrgos, Esochoria, Kastania, Katavothra, Prodromos, Prousos, Sarkini, Stavrochori, Tornos, Velota)

The municipality has an area of 948.570 km^{2}, the municipal unit 250.887 km^{2}.

=== Mayor of Karpenisi ===
- Kostas Bakoyannis, 2011–2014
- Nikos Souliotis, 2014–2023
- Christos Kakavas, since 2024

== History ==
Karpenisi has a lot of history in the region. In antiquity, Karpenisi was known as Oechalia and ruled by king Evrytos, inventor of the bow.

During the Greek Revolution of 1821, the towns mountainous location was of strategic importance for central Roumeli. During more recent times, the region took part in WWI and WWII, becoming the place where the armed National Resistance was initiated. Karpenisi was badly damaged by Italian and German attacks during WWII.

== Election results ==
=== Parliamentary ===
2000

2004

2007

2009

5/2012

6/2012

1/2015

9/2015

2019

5/2023

6/2023

=== European ===
2009

2014

2019

2024

== Climate ==
Due to its altitude, Karpenisi has a temperate climate (Köppen: C), with abundant rainfall year round and much cooler temperatures. Snowfall is frequent and heavy in winter, whereas summers are pleasantly warm with cool nights.

Climate data for Karpenisi town weather station (998m)
| Month | Jan | Feb | Mar | Apr | May | Jun | Jul | Aug | Sep | Oct | Nov | Dec | Year |
|---|---|---|---|---|---|---|---|---|---|---|---|---|---|
| Mean daily maximum °C (°F) | 6 (43) | 8.9 (48.0) | 12.1 (53.8) | 14.4 (57.9) | 20.3 (68.5) | 24.5 (76.1) | 27.4 (81.3) | 28.5 (83.3) | 24.2 (75.6) | 19.9 (67.8) | 13 (55) | 10.5 (50.9) | 17.5 (63.4) |
| Mean daily minimum °C (°F) | −1.7 (28.9) | 0.2 (32.4) | 2.2 (36.0) | 4.4 (39.9) | 8.5 (47.3) | 12.7 (54.9) | 15.5 (59.9) | 16.4 (61.5) | 13.3 (55.9) | 9 (48) | 5.5 (41.9) | 2 (36) | 7.3 (45.2) |
| Average precipitation mm (inches) | 164.7 (6.48) | 108.7 (4.28) | 107.5 (4.23) | 101.2 (3.98) | 58.5 (2.30) | 54.8 (2.16) | 62.2 (2.45) | 39.7 (1.56) | 171.6 (6.76) | 76.7 (3.02) | 145 (5.7) | 179.7 (7.07) | 1,270.3 (49.99) |
Source: http://penteli.meteo.gr/stations/karpenisitown/ (2019 - 2020 averages)

== Historical population ==
| Year | Municipal unit | Municipality |
|---|---|---|
| 1981 | 5,230 | – |
| 1991 | 8,185 | – |
| 2001 | 9,390 | – |
| 2011 | 8,575 | 13,105 |
| 2021 | 7,921 | 11,445 |

== Sister cities ==
- Asheville, United States
- Messolonghi, Greece
- Engomi, Cyprus

== Notable people ==
- Zacharias Papantoniou (1877–1940), writer
- Ioannis Theodoropoulos, bronze medal in the pole vault 1896 Summer Olympics
- Georgios Kondylis (1878–1936), General of the Greek army and Prime Minister of Greece
- Charalambos Katsimitros (1886–1962), General of the Greek army who distinguished himself during the Greco-Italian War
- Pavlos Bakoyannis (1935–1989), Greek politician and journalist

== Notable events ==
- Battle of Karpenisi (8 August 1823) during the Greek War of Independence
