= Western Greece =

Administrative region of Greece

Western Greece Περιφέρεια Δυτικής Ελλάδας
- Administrative region
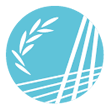
- Logo

- Coordinates: 38.2°N 21.4°E
- Country: Greece
- Decentralized Administration: Peloponnese, Western Greece and the Ionian
- Capital and largest city: Patras
- Regional units: List: Achaea; Aetolia-Acarnania; Elis

Government
  - Governor: Nektarios Farmakis (New Democracy)

Area
  - Total: 11,350.18 km^{2} (4,382.33 sq mi)

Population (2024)
  - Total: 640,243
  - Density: 56.4082/km^{2} (146.097/sq mi)

GDP
  - Total: €10.223 billion (2024)
  - Per capita: €16,099 (2024)
- Time zone: UTC+2 (EET)
  - Summer (DST): UTC+3 (EEST)
- ISO 3166 code: GR-G
- HDI (2023): 0.878 very high · 12th of 13
- Website: www.pde.gov.gr

Western Greece Region (Greek: Περιφέρεια Δυτικής Ελλάδας, romanized: Periféria Dhitikís Elládhas, [periˈferia ðitiˈcis eˈlaðas]) is one of the thirteen administrative regions of Greece. It comprises the western part of continental Greece and the northwestern part of the Peloponnese peninsula. It occupies an area of 11,336 km^{2} (4,377 sq mi) and its population is, according to the 2011 census, at 679,796 inhabitants. The capital of the Western Greece is Patras, the third-largest-city in the country, with a population of about 280,000 inhabitants. The NUTS 2 code for the region of Western Greece is EL63.

== Administration ==
The region of Western Greece was established in the 1987 administrative reform. With the 2010 Kallikratis plan, its powers and authority were redefined and extended. Along with Peloponnese and the Ionian Islands regions, it is supervised by the Decentralized Administration of Peloponnese, Western Greece and the Ionian Islands based at Patras. The region is based at Patras and is divided into three regional units (pre-Kallikratis prefectures), Aetolia-Acarnania in Central Greece and Achaea and Elis in Peloponnese, which are further subdivided into 19 municipalities.

== Climate ==
The region has hot, dry summers and mild, wet winters, typical of a Mediterranean climate (Köppen: Csa). Sunny days dominate during the summer months in areas within the beaches and partially cloudy and rainy in the mountains. Snow is very common during the winter in the mountains of Erymanthus, Panachaiko and Aroania. Winter average temperatures are around the 10 °C (50 °F) mark throughout the low-lying areas.

== Economy ==
The Gross domestic product (GDP) of the region was €8.3 billion in 2018, accounting for 4.5% of Greek economic output. GDP per capita adjusted for purchasing power was €15,200 or 50% of the EU27 average in the same year. The GDP per employee was 65% of the EU average.

== Demographics ==
The population has shrunk by 36,447 people between 2011 and 2021, a decrease of 5.4%.

== Major communities ==
- Agrinio (Αγρίνιο)
- Aigio (Αίγιο)
- Amaliada (Αμαλιάδα)
- Amfilochia (Αμφιλοχία)
- Archaia Olympia (Αρχαία Ολυμπία) or Olympia (Ολυμπία)
- Farres (Φαρρές)
- Gastouni (Γαστούνη)
- Kalavryta (Καλάβρυτα)
- Kato Achaia (Κάτω Αχαΐα)
- Messolonghi (Μεσολόγγι)
- Nafpaktos (Ναύπακτος)
- Patras (Πάτρα)
- Pyrgos (Πύργος)
- Vouprasia (Βουπρασία)
- Zacharo (Ζαχάρω)

== Gallery ==
Region of Western Greece administrative building in Patras
