= Thessaly =

Administrative region of Greece

Thessaly Θεσσαλία (Greek)
- Administrative region of Greece; Traditional region of Greece
- Thessaly within Greece
- Coordinates: 39.6°N 22.2°E
- Country: Greece
- Decentralized Administration: Thessaly and Central Greece
- Cession: 1881
- Capital: Larissa
- Port city: Volos
- Regional units: List: Karditsa; Larissa; Magnesia; Trikala; Sporades

Government
  - Governor: Dimitris Kouretas (Syriza)

Area
  - Total: 14,036.64 km^{2} (5,419.58 sq mi)

Population (2021)
  - Total: 688,255
  - Density: 49.0327/km^{2} (126.994/sq mi)
- Demonym: Thessalian

GDP
  - Total: €12.079 billion (2024)
  - Per capita: €17,868 (2024)
- Time zone: UTC+2 (EET)
  - Summer (DST): UTC+3 (EEST)
- ISO 3166 code: GR-E
- HDI (2023): 0.894 very high · 5th of 13
- Website: www.pthes.gov.gr

Thessaly (Note: pronounced /ˈθɛsəli/ THESS-ə-lee) (Greek: Θεσσαλία, romanized: Thessalía) (Note: Greek pronunciation: [θesaˈli.a]) is a traditional geographic and modern administrative region of Greece, comprising most of the ancient region of the same name. Before the Greek Dark Ages, Thessaly was known as Aeolia (Ancient Greek: Αἰολία, Aiolía), and appears in Homer's Odyssey.

Thessaly became part of the modern Greek state in 1881, after four and a half centuries of Ottoman rule. Since 1987 it has formed one of the country's 13 regions and is further (since the Kallikratis reform of 2011) sub-divided into five regional units and 25 municipalities. The capital of the region is Larissa. Thessaly lies in northern central Greece and borders the regions of Macedonia to the north, Epirus to the west, Central Greece to the south, and the Aegean Sea to the east. The Thessaly region also includes the Sporades islands.

== Name and etymology ==
Thessaly is named after the Thessaloi, an ancient Greek tribe. The meaning of the name of this tribe is unknown, and many theories have been made about its etymology. According to the Dutch linguist Robert S. P. Beekes, the name predates Greek presence in the region and could come from the Pre-Greek form reconstructed as *Kʷʰeťťal-. The Greek linguist Georgios Babiniotis also assigns the origin of the name of the Thessalians to pre-Greek times, although he does not try to explain its etymology. In Aromanian it is referred to as Tesalia.

In ancient Thessalian, it is called Πετθαλία, Petthalía.

== Mythology ==
In Homer's epic, the Odyssey, the hero Odysseus visited Aeolia, the kingdom of Aeolus, which was the old name for Thessaly.

Homer refers to Hellenes as an originally relatively small tribe settled in Thessalic Phthia. During the era of the Trojan War they were centered along the settlements of Alos, Alope, Trachis, and the Pelasgian Argos. This Homeric Hellas is described as "καλλιγύναικος", kalligýnaikos, "of beautiful women", and its warriors, the Hellenes, along with the feared Myrmidons, were under the command of Achilles. The Parian Chronicle mentions that Phthia was the homeland of the Hellenes and that this name was given to those previously called Greeks (Γραικοί). Alcman (7th century BC) also refers that the mothers of Hellenes were Graikoi. In Greek mythology, Hellen, the patriarch of Hellenes, was son of Deucalion, who ruled around Phthia with Pyrrha, the only survivors after the great deluge. It seems that the myth was invented when the Greek tribes started to separate from each other in certain areas of Greece and it indicates their common origin. The name Hellenes was probably used by the Greeks with the establishment of the Great Amphictyonic League. This was an ancient association of Greek tribes with twelve founders which was organized to protect the great temples of Apollo in Delphi (Phocis) and of Demeter near Thermopylae (Locris). According to legend it was founded after the Trojan War, by the eponymous Amphictyon, brother of Hellen.

The Plain of Thessaly, which lies between Mount Oeta/Othrys and Mount Olympus, was the site of the battle between the Titans and the Olympians.

According to legend, Jason and the Argonauts launched their search for the Golden Fleece from the Magnesia Peninsula.

== History ==
Map of ancient Thessaly

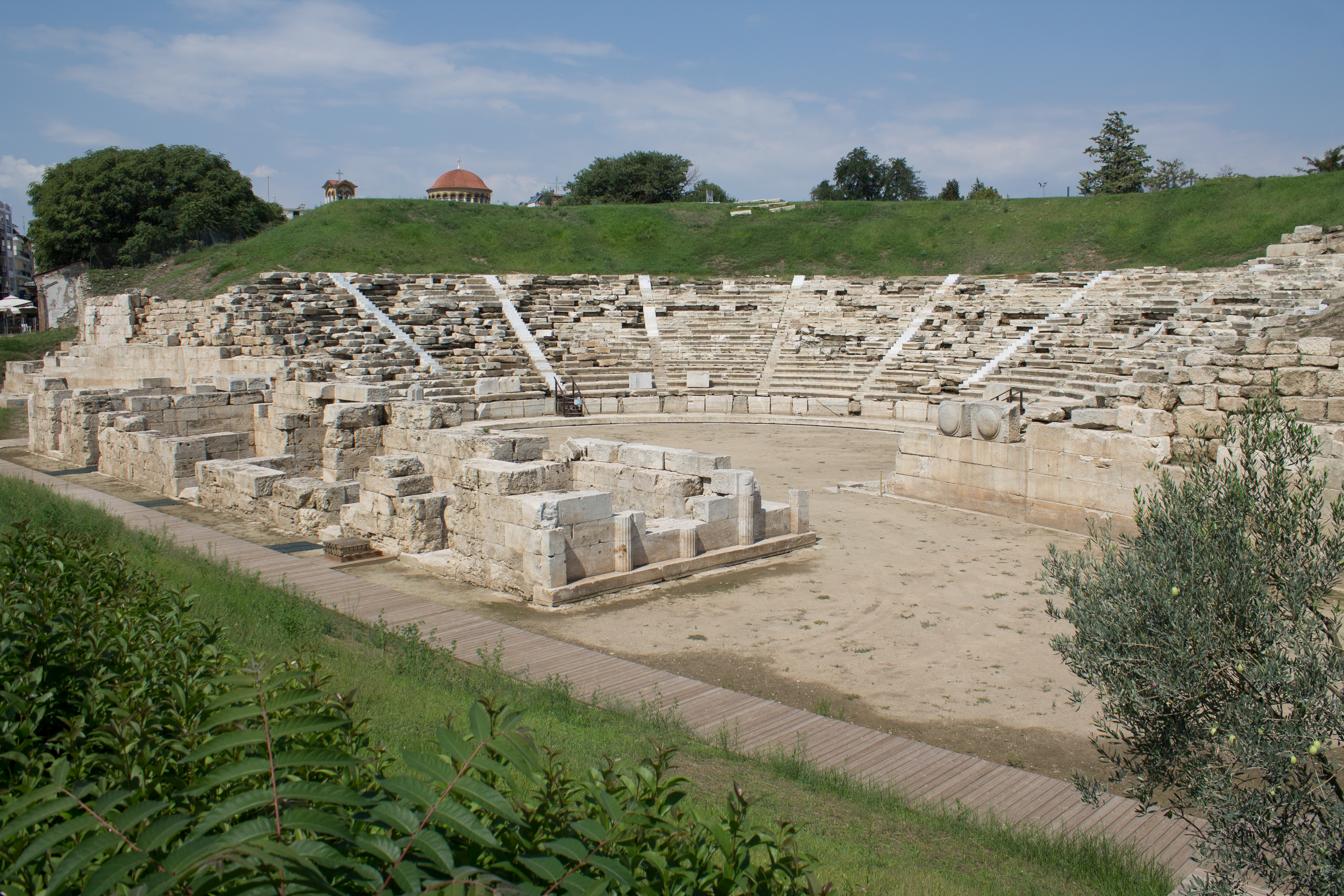
The first ancient theatre of Larissa. It was constructed inside the ancient city's centre during the reign of Antigonus II Gonatas towards the end of the 3rd century BC. The theatre was in use for six centuries, until the end of the 3rd century AD

=== Ancient history ===
Thessaly was home to extensive Neolithic and Chalcolithic cultures around 6000–2500 BC (see Cardium pottery, Dimini and Sesklo). Mycenaean settlements have also been discovered, for example at the sites of Iolcos, Dimini and Sesklo (near Volos). In Archaic and Classical times, the lowlands of Thessaly became the home of baronial families, such as the Aleuadae of Larissa or the Scopads of Crannon.

In the summer of 480 BC, the Persians invaded Thessaly. The Greek army that guarded the Vale of Tempe was alerted by Alexander I of Macedon and evacuated the road before the enemy arrived. Not much later, Thessaly surrendered to the Persians. The Thessalian family of Aleuadae joined the Persians subsequently. The following year, the Persians were decisively defeated at the Battle of Plataea and withdrew from all of their European possessions, including Thessaly.

In the 4th century BC, after the Greco-Persian Wars had long ended, Jason of Pherae transformed the region into a significant military power, recalling the glory of Early Archaic times. Shortly after, Philip II of Macedon was appointed Archon of Thessaly, and Thessaly was thereafter associated with the Macedonian Kingdom for the next two centuries. Thessalian cavalry played a crucial role in the victories of Alexander the Great at the battles of Issus and Gaugamela. His famous horse Bucephalus was from Thessaly. Lysimachus, one of the Diadochi, originated from Thessaly.

Thessaly later became part of the Roman Empire as part of the province of Macedonia; when that was broken up, the name resurfaced in two of its late Roman successor provinces: Thessalia Prima and Thessalia Secunda.

=== Byzantine period ===
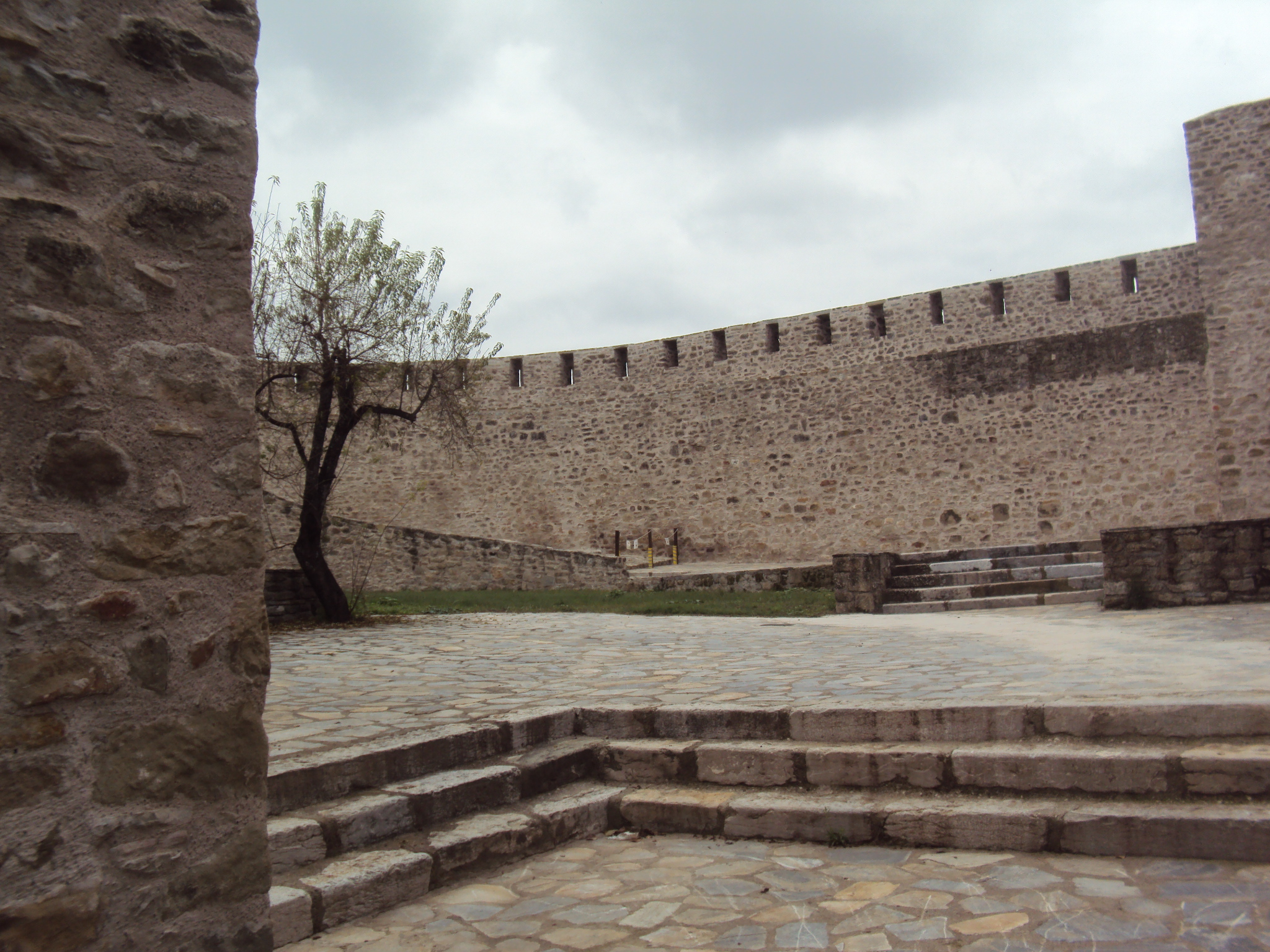
Part of the Byzantine castle of Trikala

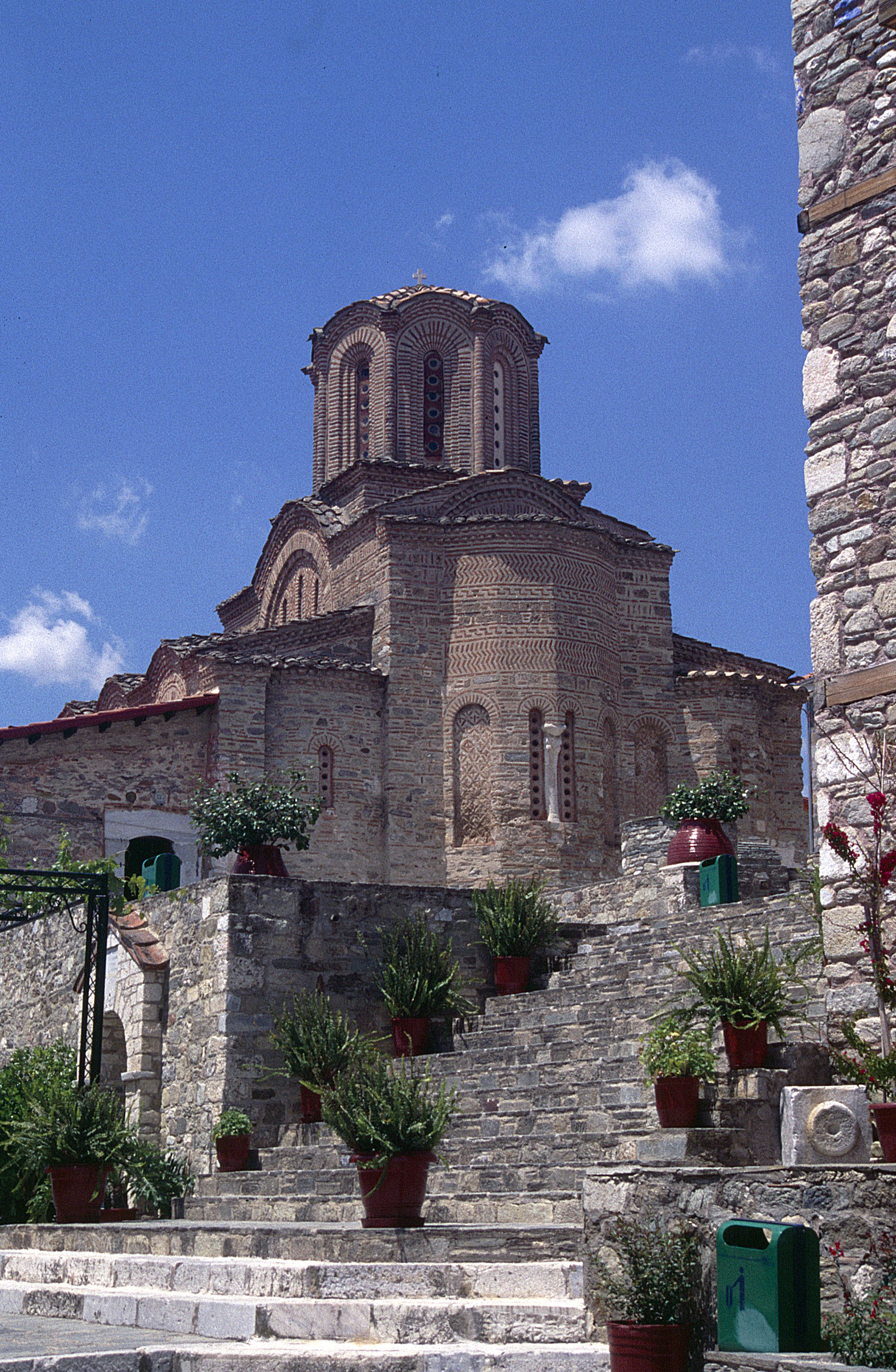
View of the Panagia Olympiotissa Monastery in Elassona

Thessaly remained part of the East Roman "Byzantine" Empire after the collapse of Roman power in the west, and subsequently suffered many invasions, such as by the Slavic tribe of the Belegezites in the 7th century AD. The Avars had arrived in Europe in the late 550s. They asserted their authority over many Slavs, who were divided into numerous petty tribes. Many Slavs were made into an effective infantry force, by the Avars. In the 7th century the Avar-Slav alliance began to raid the Byzantine Empire, laying siege to Thessalonica and even the imperial capital Constantinople itself.

By the 8th century, Slavs had occupied most of the Balkans from Austria to the Peloponnese, and from the Adriatic to the Black seas, with the exception of the coastal areas and certain mountainous regions of the Greek peninsula. Relations between the Slavs and Greeks were probably peaceful apart from the (supposed) initial settlement and intermittent uprisings. Being agriculturalists, the Slavs probably traded with the Greeks inside towns. It is likely that the re-Hellenization had already begun by way of this contact. This process would be completed by a newly reinvigorated Byzantine Empire.

With the abatement of Arab-Byzantine Wars, the Byzantine Empire began to consolidate its power in those areas of mainland Greece occupied by Proto-Slavic tribes. Following the campaigns of the Byzantine general Staurakios in 782–783, the Byzantine Empire recovered Thessaly, taking many Slavs as prisoners. Apart from military expeditions against Slavs, the re-Hellenization process begun under Nicephorus I involved (often forcible) transfer of peoples.

Many Slavs were moved to other parts of the empire such as Anatolia and made to serve in the military. In return, many Greeks from Sicily and Asia Minor were brought to the interior of Greece, to increase the number of defenders at the Emperor's disposal and dilute the concentration of Slavs.

=== Late Medieval period ===
Coat of arms of the Duchy of Neopatras.

In 977 Byzantine Thessaly was raided by the Bulgarian Empire. In 1066 dissatisfaction with the taxation policy led the Aromanian and Bulgarian population of Thessaly to revolt against the Byzantine Empire under the leadership of a local lord, Nikoulitzas Delphinas. The revolt, which began in Larissa, soon expanded to Trikala and later northwards to the Byzantine-Bulgarian border. In 1199–1201 another unsuccessful revolt was led by Manuel Kamytzes, son-in-law of Byzantine emperor Alexios III Angelos, with the support of Dobromir Chrysos, the autonomous ruler of Prosek. Kamytzes managed to establish a short-lived principality in northern Thessaly, before he was overcome by an imperial expedition.

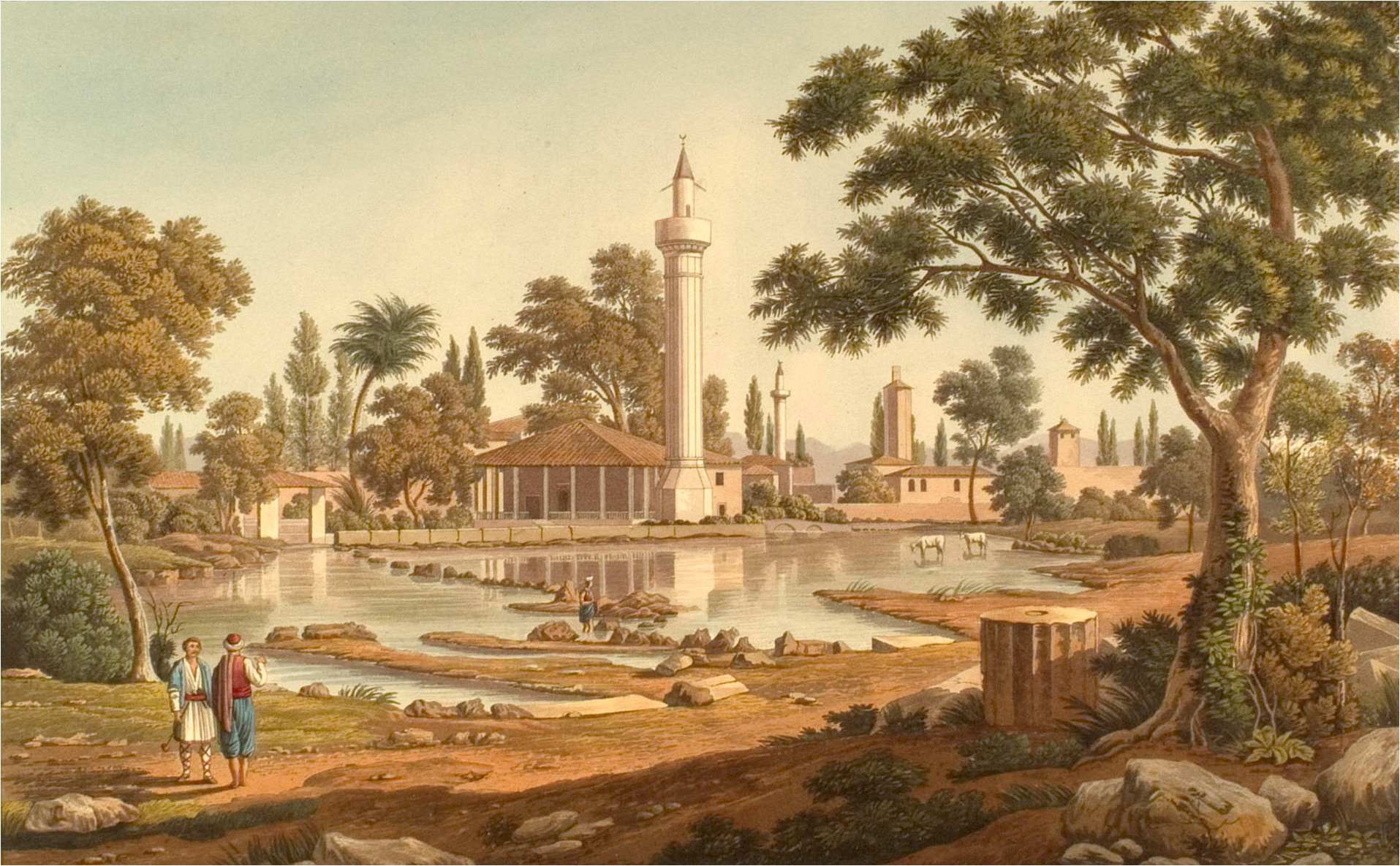
"The Hyperian Fountain at Pherae", during the Ottoman era, by Edward Dodwell.

Following the siege of Constantinople and the dissolution of the Byzantine Empire by the Fourth Crusade in April 1204, Thessaly passed to Boniface of Montferrat's Kingdom of Thessalonica in the wider context of the Frankokratia. With his Greek ties, Boniface won the support of the Greek population and of various important Greek families. In 1212, Michael I Komnenos Doukas, ruler of Epirus, led his troops into Thessaly. Larissa and much of central Thessaly came under Epirote rule, thereby separating Thessalonica from the Crusader principalities in southern Greece. Michael's work was completed by his half-brother and successor, Theodore Komnenos Doukas, who by 1220 completed the recovery of the entire region, and assigned pronoiai to aristocratic Greek families.

The Vlachs (Aromanians) of Thessaly (originally a chiefly transhumant Romance-speaking population) first appear in Byzantine sources in the 11th century, in the Strategikon of Kekaumenos and Anna Komnene's Alexiad. In the 12th century, the Jewish traveller Benjamin of Tudela records the existence of the district of "Vlachia" near Halmyros in eastern Thessaly, while the Byzantine historian Niketas Choniates places "Great Vlachia" (Aromanian: Vlãhia Mari) near Meteora. The term is also used by the 13th-century scholar George Pachymeres, and it appears as a distinct administrative unit in 1276, when the pinkernes Raoul Komnenos was its governor (kephale).

From 1271 to 1318 Thessaly was an independent despotate that extended to Acarnania and Aetolia, run by the dynasty founded by John I Doukas. John ruled from 1271 until his death in 1289 and was succeeded by his sons Constantine and Theodore. At this time, Thessaly came under Byzantine suzerainty, though it largely retained its independence. After Constantine's death in 1303, it was ruled by John II Doukas until his death in 1318. From 1306 to 1310, the Almogavars or Catalan Company of the East (Societas Catalanorum Magna), plundered Thessaly. In 1310, they occupied a series of forts in the south. From there they departed to the Duchy of Athens, called by the duke Walter I, whom they eventually killed in battle and took over the Duchy of Athens. In 1318, with the death of John II, Thessalian independence came to an end, and the Almogavars occupied Siderokastron and southern Thessaly (1319) and formed the Duchy of Neopatria. The other parts of Thessaly either came under Byzantine rule or were ruled by their own nobility. These local magnates eventually started fighting amongst themselves. Those in the south, such as the Melissenos family of Volos, sought the help of the Catalans, while those in the north, such as the Gavrilopoulos family of Trikala, turned towards Byzantium. At this time, some of Thessaly's ports came under Venetian rule. In 1332, most of Thessaly was taken by the Byzantines following a campaign by Andronikos III Paleologos. He left its administration to Michael Monomachos, who governed it for the next 10 years.

Groups of Albanians moved into Thessaly as early as 1268 as mercenaries of Michael Doukas. The Albanian tribes of Bua, Malakasioi and Mazaraki were described as "unruly" nomads living in the mountains of Thessaly in the early 14th century in Emperor John VI Kantakouzenos’ ‘History’. They numbered approximately 12,000. Kantakouzenos describes a pact they made to serve the Byzantine Emperor and pay tribute to him ca. 1332 in exchange for using the lowland areas of Thessaly in the summer months. Albanian groups were given military holdings Fanari in the 1330s and by the end of the 14th century and the Ottoman takeover of the region, they were an integral part of the military structures of Thessaly. Two of their military leaders known in Byzantine sources as Peter and John Sebastopoulos controlled the small towns of Pharsala and Domokos.

In 1348, Thessaly was invaded and occupied by the Serbian Empire of Stefan Dušan, under the general Preljub. After the latter's death in 1356, the region was conquered by Nikephoros Orsini after he won the support of the local Greek population. After his death three years later, it was taken over by the self-proclaimed Serbian emperor Simeon Uroš. Simeon's son John Uroš succeeded in 1370 but abdicated in 1373, and Thessaly was administered by the Greek Angeloi-Philanthropenoi clan until the Ottoman conquest c. 1393.

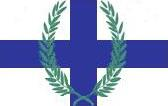
One of the flags used in Thessaly during the Greek War of Independence (designed by Anthimos Gazis).

=== Ottoman period ===
Ottoman control began in the late 14th century with the capture of Larissa in 1392-93 and consolidated in the early 15th century. Nevertheless, Ottoman control was threatened throughout this era by groups of Greeks, Albanians and Aromanians who based themselves in the mountainous areas of Thessaly. At the time of the Ottoman conquest, the great Eastern plain of Thessaly was almost entirely depopulated as a result of the nearly continuous warfare of the previous decades. It was resettled by Turkish settlers from Western Anatolia and Greeks from Western Thessaly and the surrounding mountains. In the following decades, the population of this area grew very rapidly as a result of law and order. Thessaly was ruled through the Sanjak of Tirhala administrative division during the Ottoman period. In the 1520s, Muslims made up of 17.5% of the population of the Sanjak.

Failed Greek uprisings occurred in 1600/1 and 1612, and during the Morean War (1684–1699) and the Orlov Revolt (1770).

In 1780, Ali Pasha of Ioannina took over control of Thessaly, and consolidated his rule after 1808, when he suppressed a local uprising. Heavy taxation, however, ruined the province's commerce, and coupled with the outbreak of the plague in 1813, reduced the population to some 200,000 by 1820. Rigas Feraios, the important Greek intellectual and forerunner of the Greek War of Independence was from the region. He was born in Velestino, near the ancient town of Pherae.

When the Greek War of Independence broke out in 1821, Greek risings occurred in the Pelion and Olympus mountains as well as the western mountains around Fanari, but they were swiftly suppressed by the Ottoman armies under Mehmed Reshid Pasha and Mahmud Dramali Pasha. After the establishment of the independent Kingdom of Greece, Greek nationalist agitation continued, with further revolts in 1841, in 1854 during the Crimean War, and again during the Russo-Turkish War of 1877–1878. In 1880 Thessaly's population consisted of approximately 285,000 Greeks, 40,000 Turks, and 40,000 Jews.

=== Modern ===
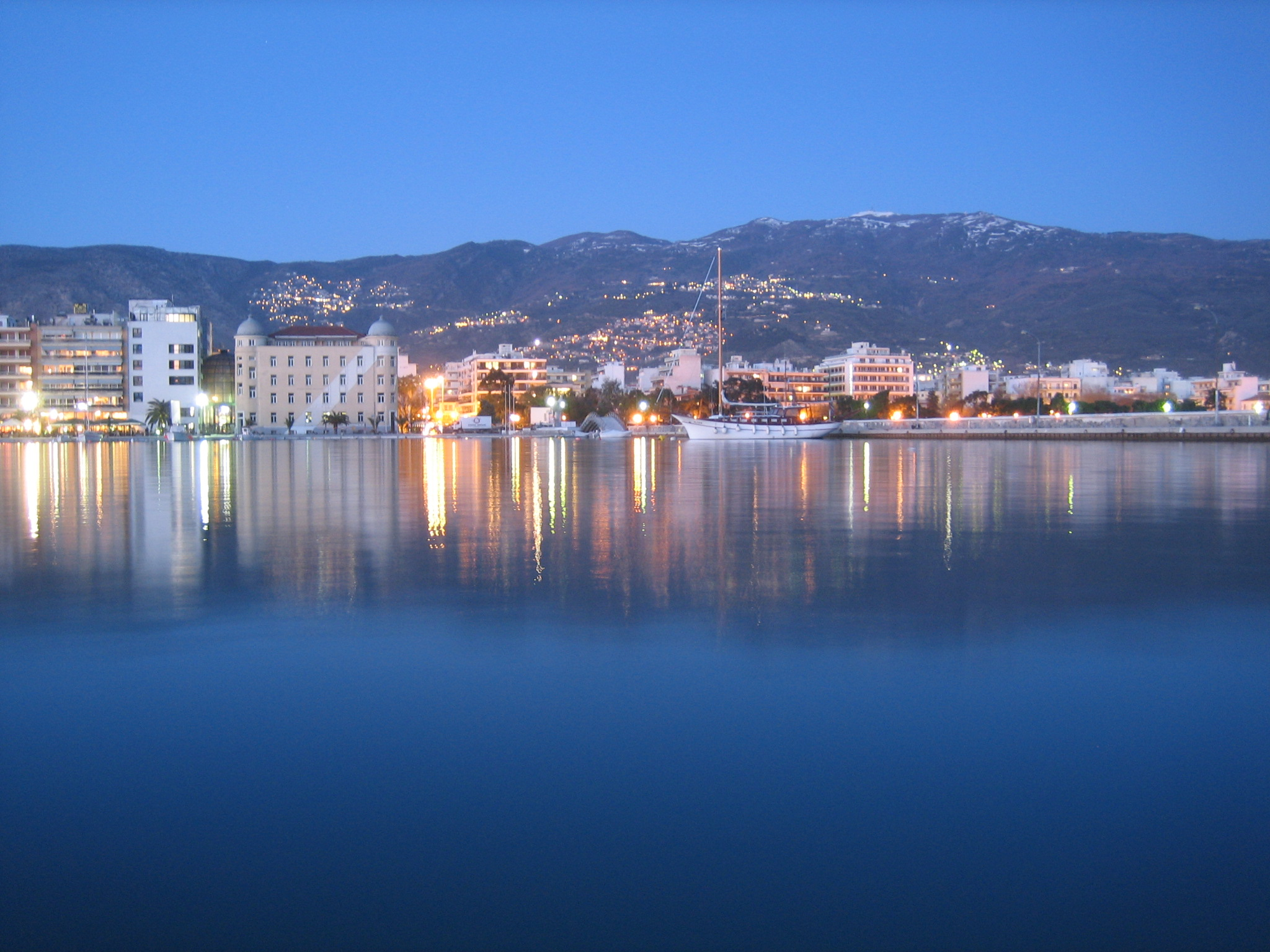
The port of Volos

Thessaly became part of the modern Greek state in 1881, after the Convention of Constantinople except the area around the town of Elassona, which remained in Ottoman hands until 1912. It was briefly captured by Ottomans during the Greco-Turkish War of 1897. After the Treaty of Constantinople (1897), Greece was forced to cede minor border areas and to pay heavy reparations. The remaining part of Thessaly held by the Ottomans was finally regained by the Greeks during the First Balkan War in 1912. In 1923, the entire Muslim population was sent to Turkey following the population exchange between Greece and Turkey at the end of the Greco-Turkish War.

During World War II, Thessaly was occupied by the Kingdom of Italy from April 1941 to September 1943. After the Armistice of Cassibile, Germany occupied Thessaly until October 1944. It became a major centre of the Greek Resistance, most famously seeing the desertion of the Italian Pinerolo Division to the guerrillas of EAM-ELAS in 1943.

== Geography ==
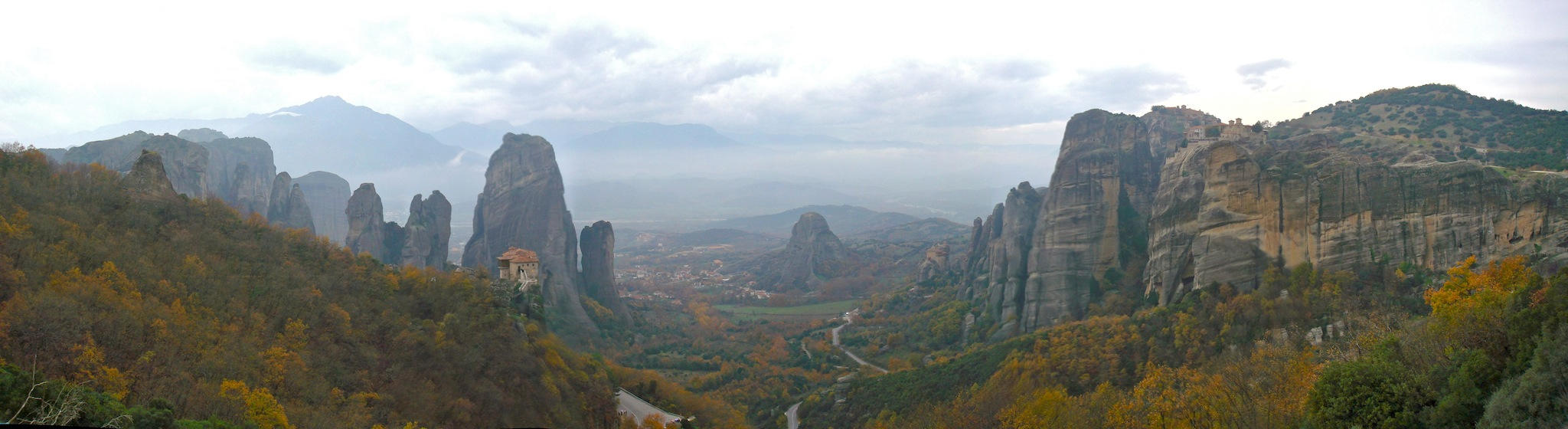
Panoramic view of Meteora valley

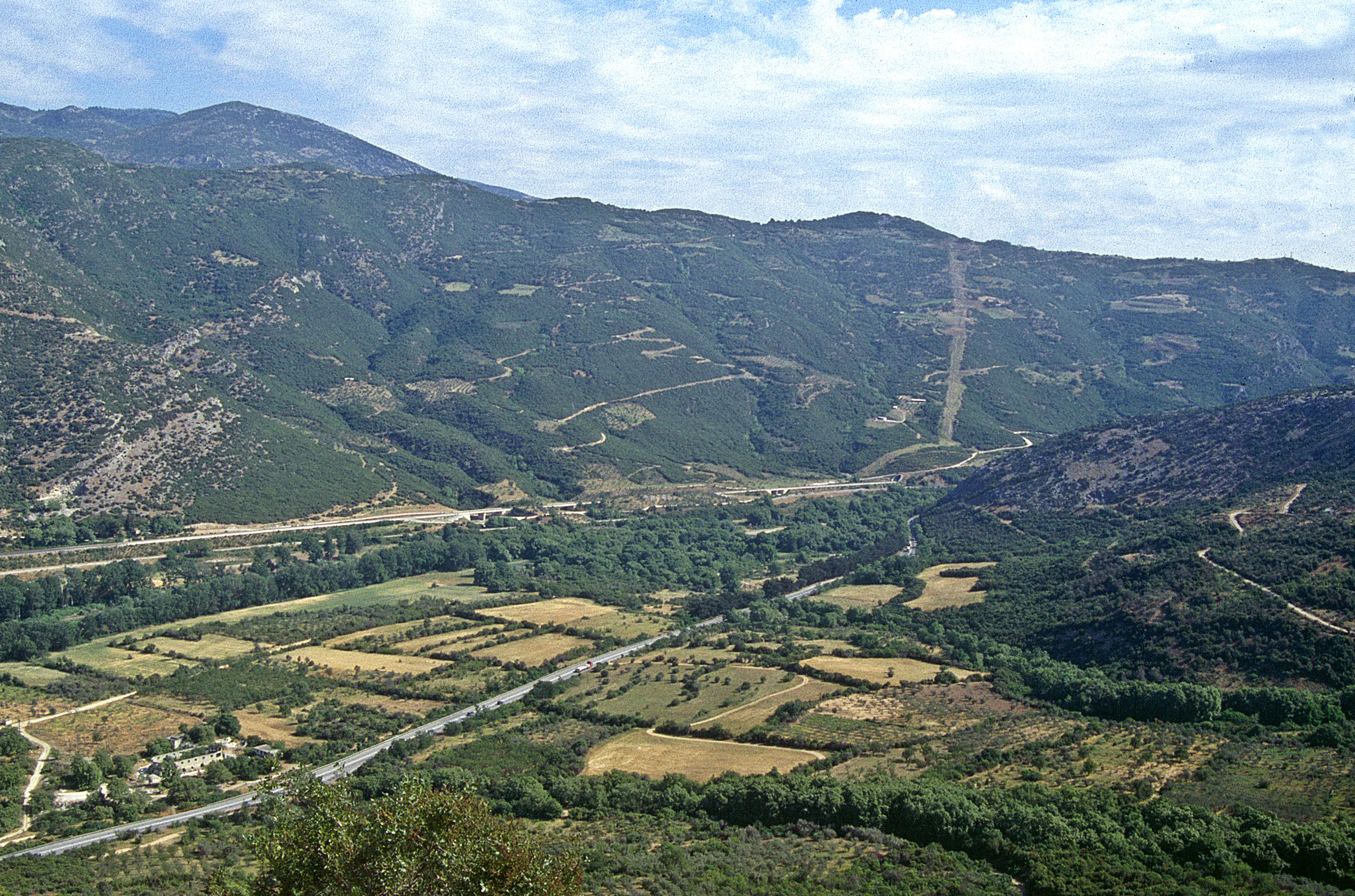
Vale of Tempe

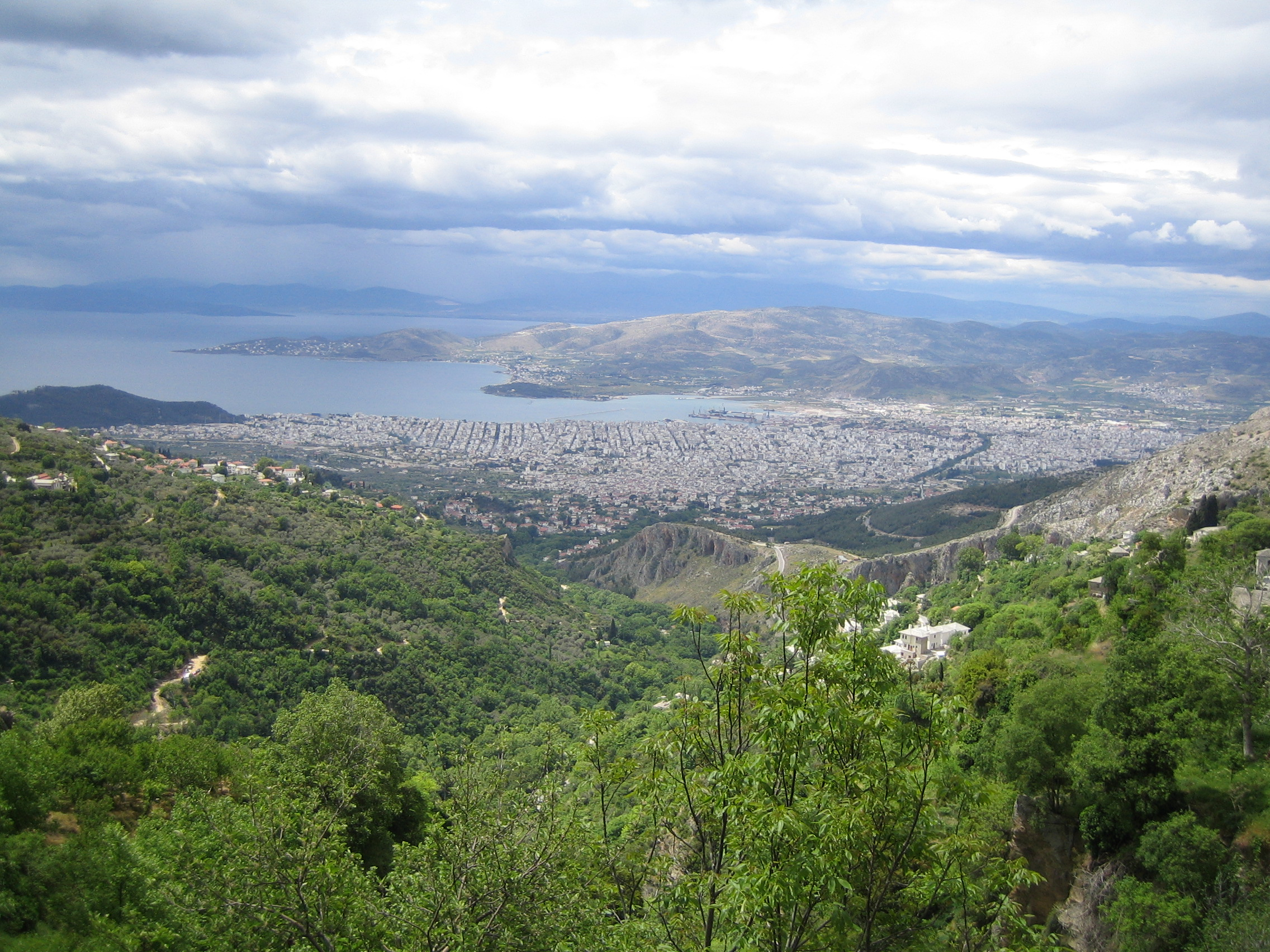
Volos view from Pelion mountain.

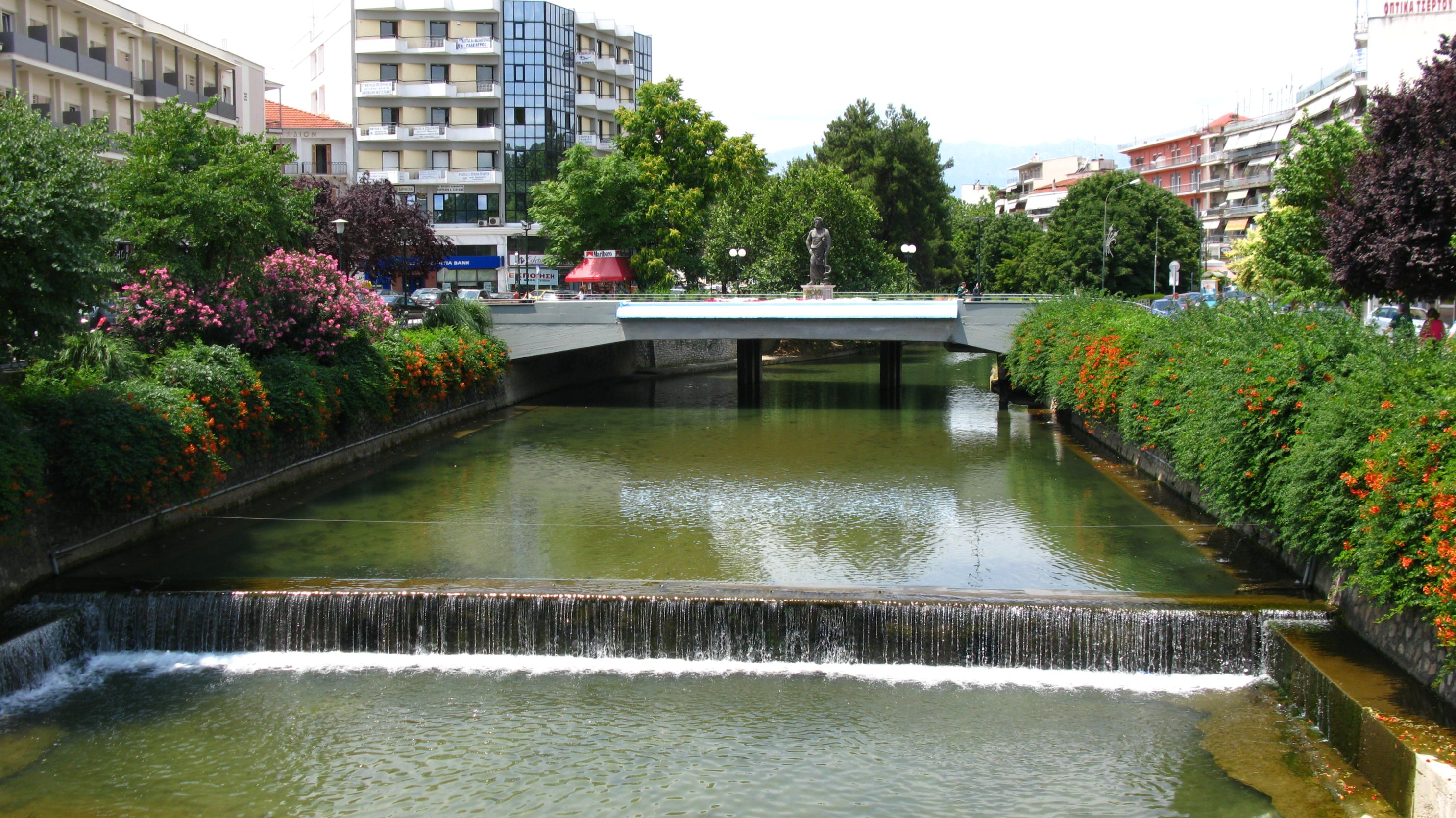
Litheos river flowing through the city of Trikala

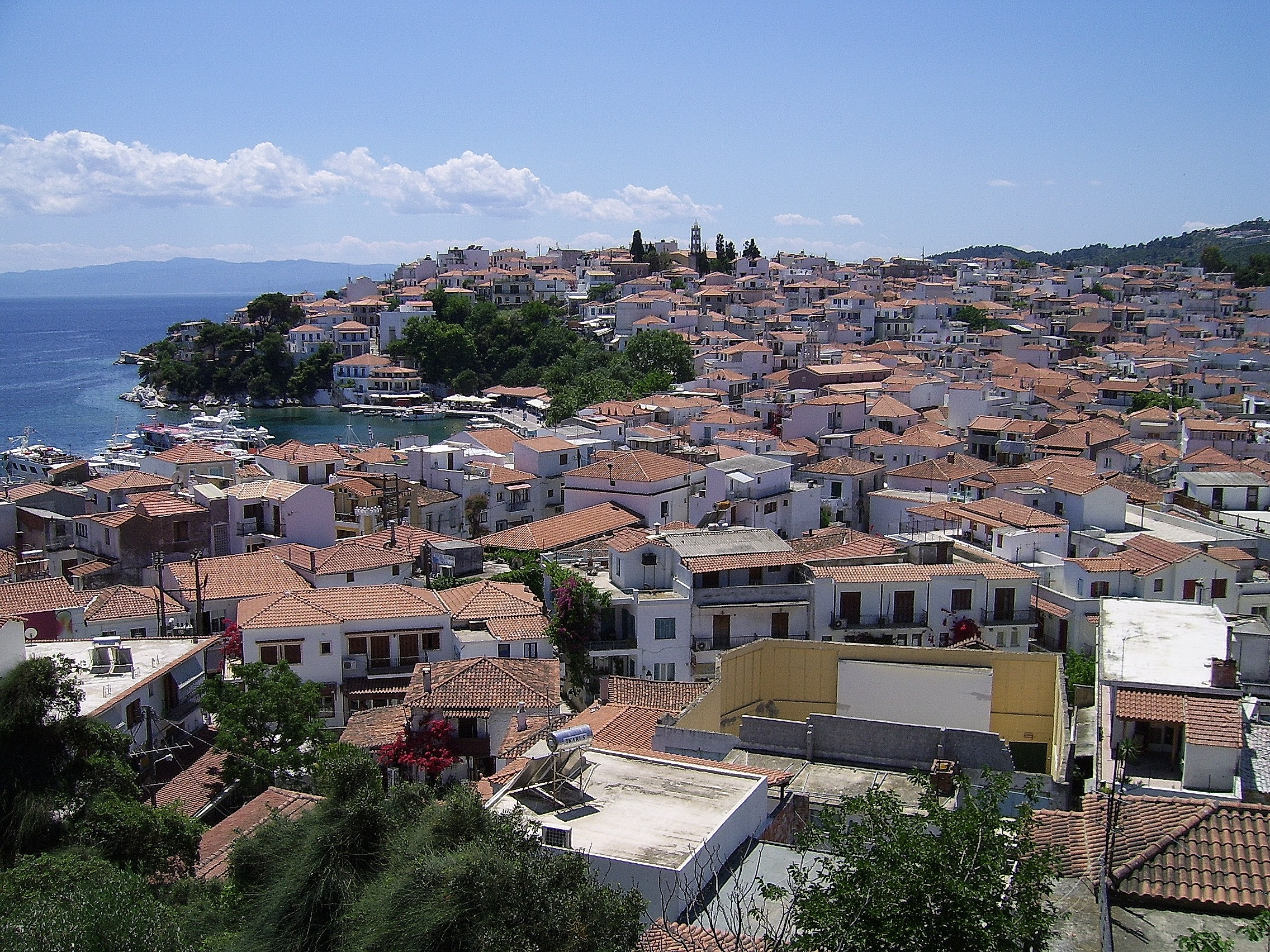
Skiathos island

Thessaly occupies the east side of the Pindus watershed, extending south from Macedonia to the Aegean Sea. The northern tier of Thessaly is defined by a generally southwest–northeast spur of the Pindus range that includes Mount Olympus, close to the Macedonian border. Within that broken spur of mountains are several basins and river valleys.

The easternmost extremity of the spur extends southeastward from Mount Olympus along the Aegean coast, terminating in the Magnesia Peninsula that envelops the Pagasetic Gulf (also called the Gulf of Volos), and forms an inlet of the Aegean Sea. Thessaly's major river, the Pineios, flows eastward from the central Pindus Range just south of the spur, emptying into the Thermaic Gulf.

The Trikala and Larissa lowlands form a central plain which is surrounded by a ring of mountains. It has distinct summer and winter seasons, with summer rains augmenting the fertility of the plains. This has led to Thessaly occasionally being called the "breadbasket of Greece".

The region is well delineated by topographical boundaries. The Chasia and Kamvounia mountains lie to the north, the Mount Olympus massif to the northeast. To the west lies the Pindus mountain range, to the southeast the coastal mountains of Óssa and Pelion.

Several tributaries of the Pineios flow through the region.

=== Climate ===
Most of the province has a hot summer Mediterranean climate (Köppen: Csa), but also found is a cold semi-arid climate (BSk) including the capital Larissa (on its Mediterranean edge of category). Even in the north of Thessaly a rare humid subtropical climate (Cfa) can be found, although it is different from a climate typically below or above the tropics, it also marks the limit of this rare Cf subtype on the European continent (e. g. the small village of Kalvia).

== Demographics ==
The population of the region of Thessaly was 687,527 in 2021 census. The region has shrunk by 45,235 people between 2011 and 2021, experiencing a population loss of 6.2%.

In 2011, the population of the region of Thessaly was 732,762 and represented 6.8% of the total population of Greece. A 2.8% decrease in the population since 2001 was noted, but Thessaly remains Greece's third most populous region.

The population break-down is 44% urban, 40% agrarian, and 16% semi-urban. A decrease in the agrarian population has been accompanied by an increase in the semi-urban population.

The metropolitan area of Larissa, the capital of Thessaly, is home to more than 230,000 people, making it the biggest city of the region.

An Aromanian minority resides in Thessaly. This region, along with Epirus and Macedonia, are the regions with the biggest concentrations of Greek Aromanians. Another notable population group of Thessaly are the Karagounides, an ethnic Greek subgroup.

=== Language ===
The Aeolic dialect of Greek was spoken in Thessaly. This included several local varieties, in particular the variants of Pelasgiotis and Thessaliotis. The language was not written.

Apart from Greek, Aromanian is also spoken in Thessaly. Some Aromanian dialects from the region have some unique peculiarities of their own, such as that of Krania, which is one of the few with differential object marking (DOM) along with those dialects spoken at the west of Ohrid in North Macedonia.

== Major settlements ==
- Kardítsa (Καρδίτσα)
- Lárisa (Λάρισα)
- Tríkala (Τρίκαλα)
- Vólos (Βόλος)
- Néa Ionía (Νέα Ιωνία) (Metropolitan area of Volos)
- Elassóna (Ελασσόνα)
- Fársala (Φάρσαλα)
- Tyrnavos (Τύρναβος)
- Kalabáka/Kalampáka (Καλαμπάκα)
- Almyrós (Αλμυρός)

== Economy ==
The alluvial soils of the Pineios Basin and its tributaries make Thessaly a vital agricultural area, particularly for the production of grain, cattle, and sheep. Modernization of agricultural practices in the mid-20th century has controlled the chronic flooding that had restricted agricultural expansion and diversification in the low-lying plains. Thessaly is the leading cattle-raising area of Greece, and Aromanian shepherds move large flocks of sheep and goats seasonally between higher and lower elevations.

In the last few decades, there has been a rise in the cultivation of dried nuts such as almonds, pistachios, and walnuts, especially in the region of Almyros. An increase in the number of olive oil trees has been also observed. The nearly landlocked Gulf of Pagasai provides a natural harbor at Volos for shipping agricultural products from the plains and chromium from the mountains.

The Gross domestic product (GDP) of the province was 9.7 billion € in 2018, accounting for 5.2% of Greek economic output. GDP per capita adjusted for purchasing power was €16,100 or 53% of the EU27 average in the same year. The GDP per employee was 65% of the EU average.

The unemployment rate stood at 20.6% in 2017.

Year	2006	2007	2008	2009	2010	2011	2012	2013	2014	2015	2016	2017
unemployment rate (in %)	8.2	7.8	8.3	9.2	12.1	16.8	22.6	25.4	25.4	26.9	25.5	20.6

== Transport ==
There are a number of highways such as E75, and the main railway from Athens to Thessaloniki (Salonika) crosses Thessaly. The region is directly linked to the rest of Europe through the International Airport of Central Greece, which is located in Nea Anchialos, a small distance from Volos and Larisa. Charter flights link the region and bring tourists to the wider area, mainly in Pelion and Meteora. The new infrastructure includes a brand new terminal ready to serve 1500 passengers per hour and new airplanes.

== Administration ==
Although the historical region of Thessaly extended south into Phthiotis and at times north into West Macedonia, today the term 'Thessaly' is identified with the modern Administrative Region which was established in the 1987 administrative reform. With the 2010 Kallikratis plan, the powers and authority of the region were redefined and extended.

Along with Central Greece, it is supervised by the Decentralized Administration of Thessaly and Central Greece, based at Larissa. The region of Thessaly is divided into five regional units (four were pre-Kallikratis prefectures), Karditsa, Larissa, Magnesia, the Sporades and Trikala, which are further subdivided into twenty-five municipalities.

Municipal Populations in Thessaly
Regional Unit	Municipality	Population (2011)
Larissa	Agia	11,470
Larissa	Elassona	32,121
Larissa	Farsala	18,545
Larissa	Kileler	20,854
Larissa	Larissa	162,591
Larissa	Tempi	13,712
Larissa	Tyrnavos	25,032
Sporades	Skiathos	6,610
Sporades	Skopelos	4,960
Sporades	Alonnisos	2,750
Magnesia	Almyros	18,614
Magnesia	Rigas Feraios	10,922
Magnesia	South Pelion	10,216
Magnesia	Volos	144,449
Magnesia	Zagora-Mouresi	5,809
Karditsa	Argithea	3,450
Karditsa	Karditsa	56,747
Karditsa	Lake Plastiras	4,635
Karditsa	Mouzaki	13,122
Karditsa	Palamas	16,726
Karditsa	Sofades	18,864
Trikala	Farkadona	13,396
Trikala	Kalampaka	21,991
Trikala	Pyli	14,343
Trikala	Trikala	81,355

The regional governor is Dimitris Kouretas, who was elected in the second round of the 2023 regional election and took office on 1 January 2024.

== Ancient coinage ==
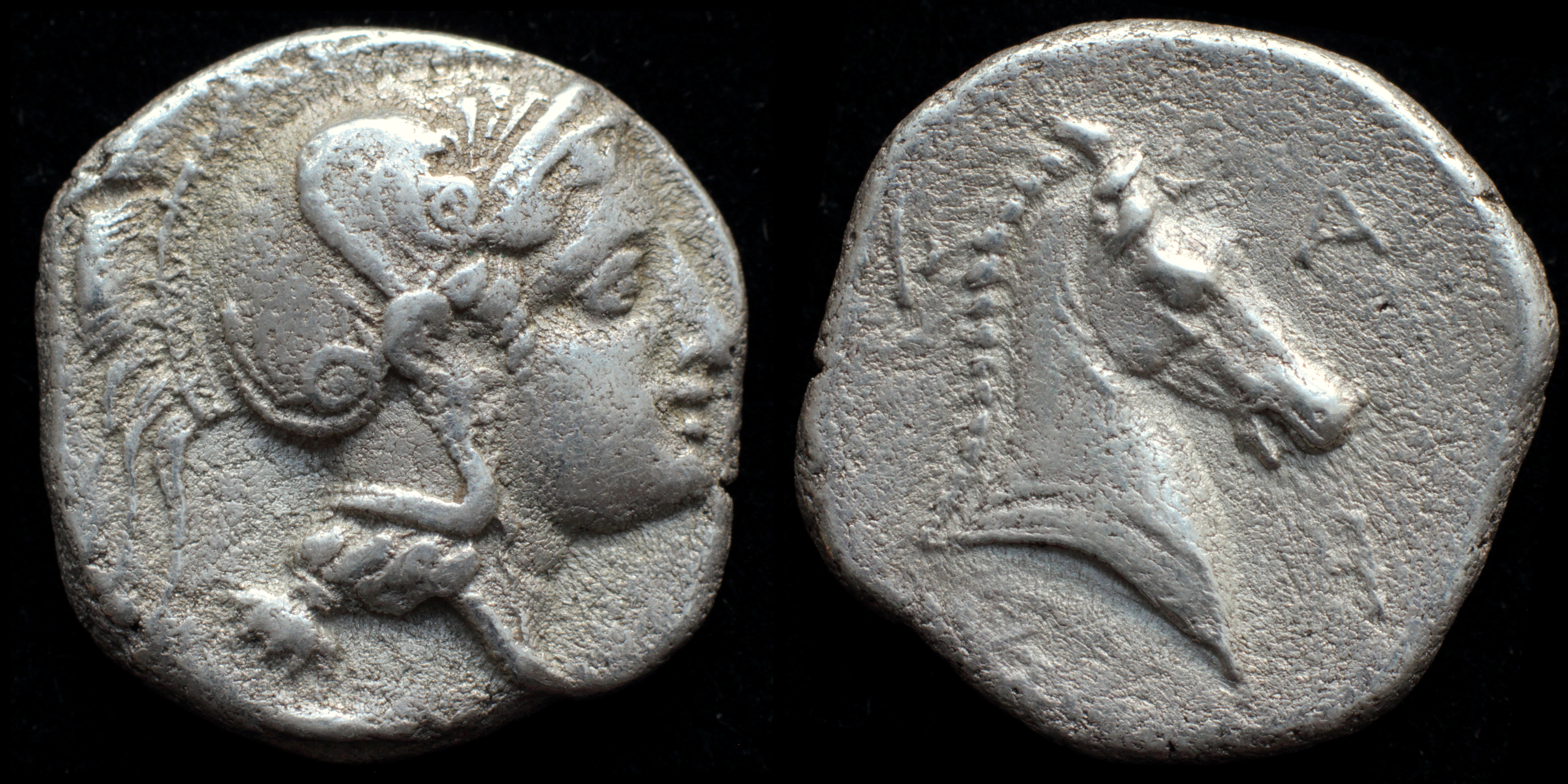
Silver hemidrachm of Pharsalos struck 450-400 BC

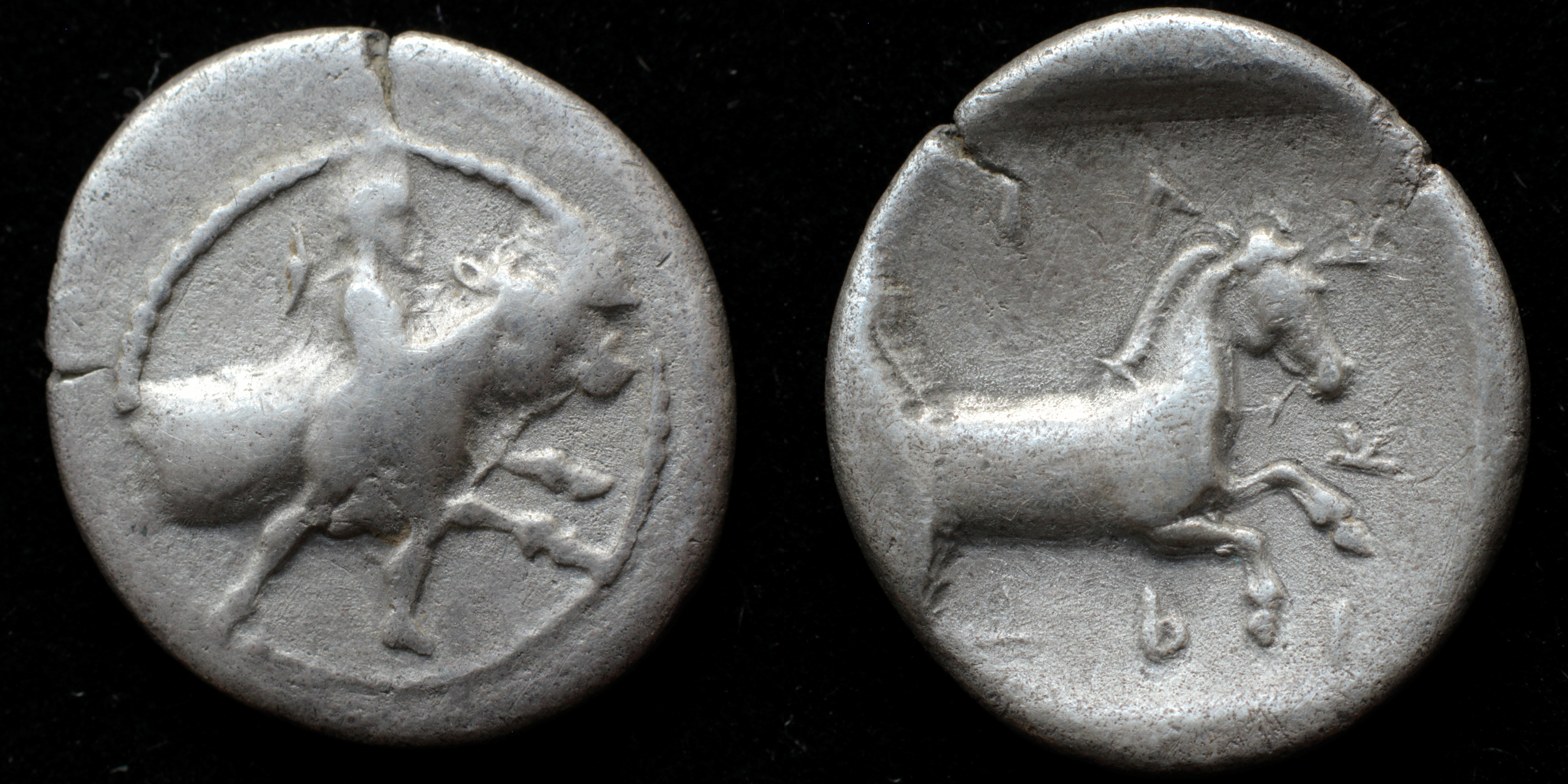
Silver hemidrachm of Trikka struck 440-400 BC

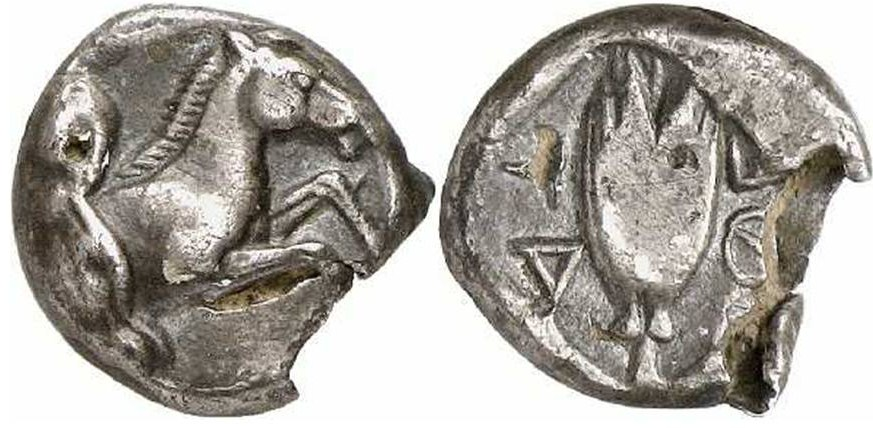
Silver hemidrachm of Thessalian League struck 470-460 BC

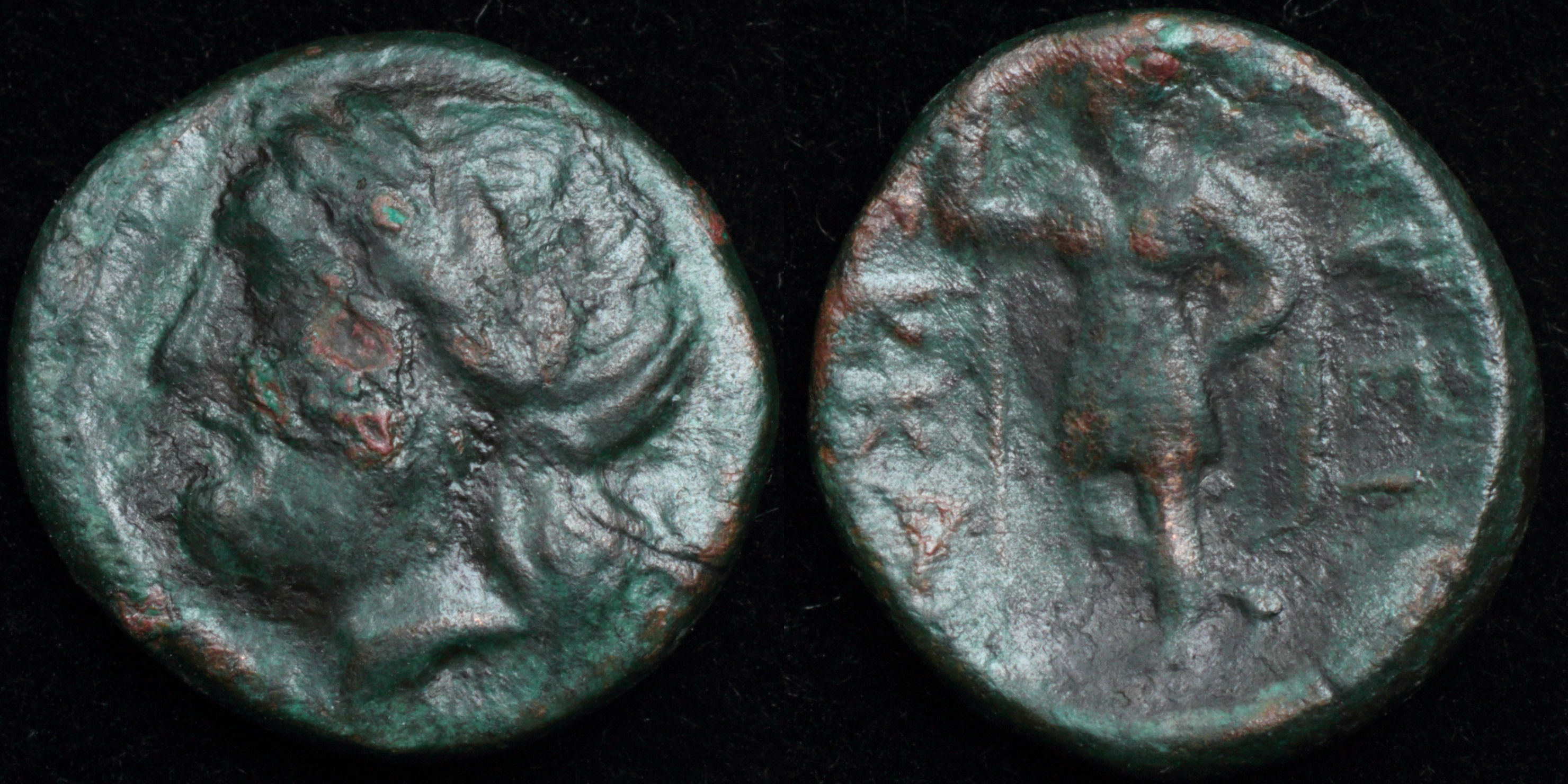
Bronze coin of Ekkarra struck 325-320 BC

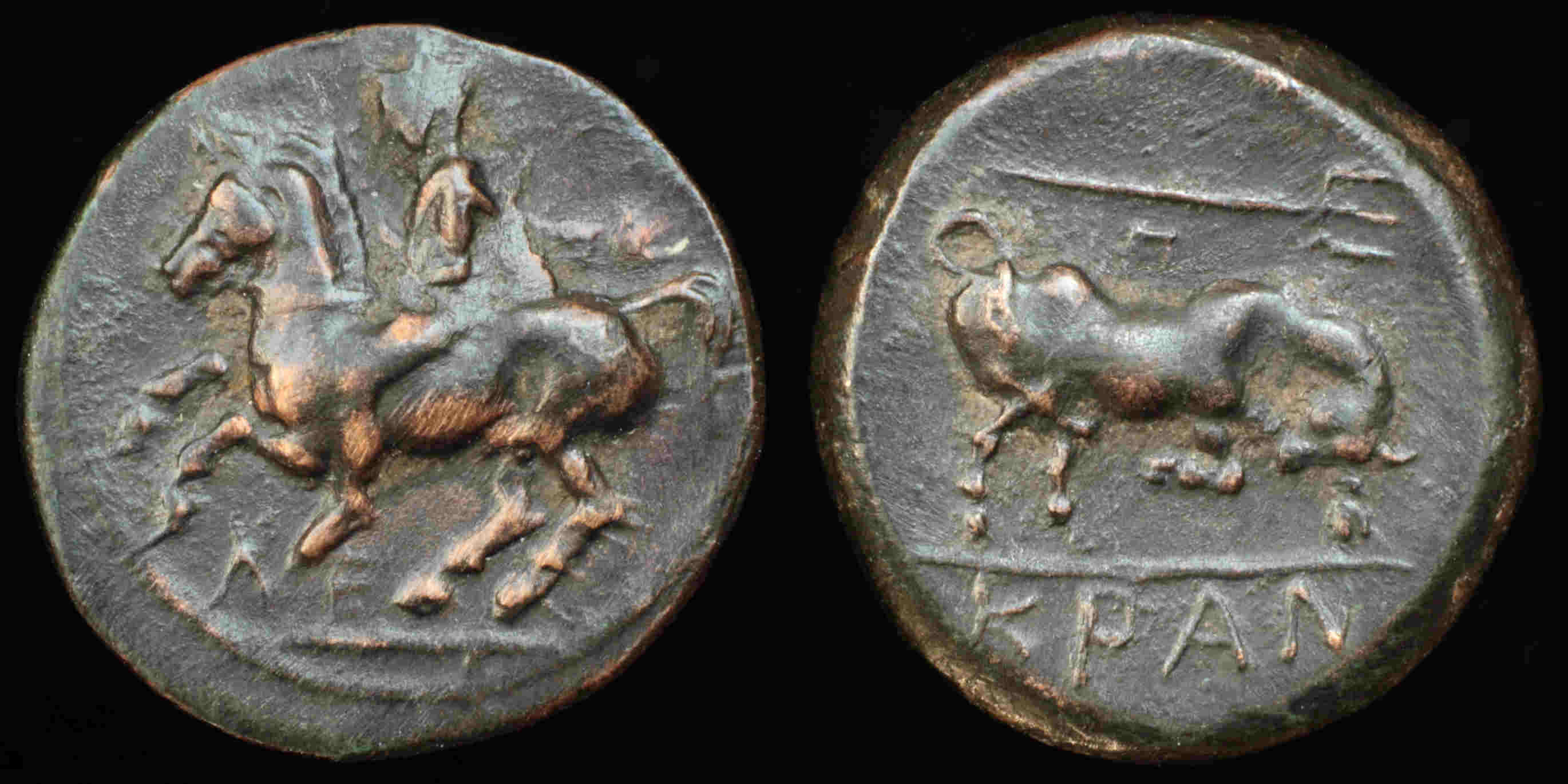
Bronze coin of Krannon struck 400-344 BC

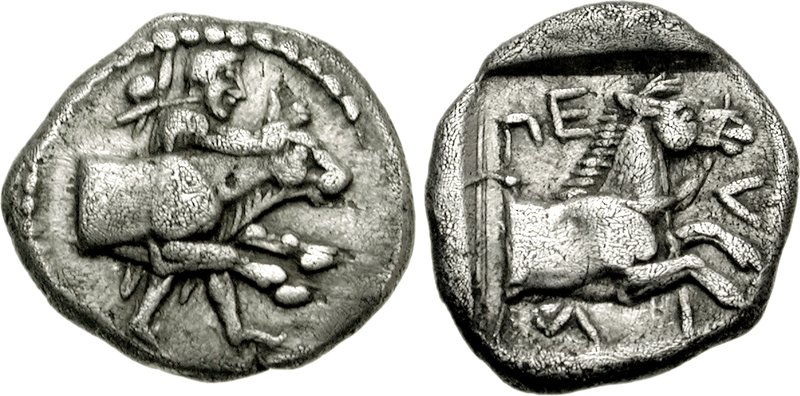
Hemidrachm coin of Pelinna struck 460-420 BC

== Popular culture ==
- In the game, Hades II (the sequel to Hades), "The Rift of Thessaly" is a massive water rift made on Thessaly by the sea-god, Poseidon (Melinoë, the Protagonist's, paternal uncle), in an (unsuccessful) attempt to prevent the Titan of Time, Chronos's, forces from laying siege upon Mount Olympus. Here, the 'Helpful-Hand' character for Melinoë while on her quest is her fellow sorceress, Lady Circe, stationed up on her private isle of "Aiaia" prior by Lady Hecate to be her eyes and ears there.
- Thessaly appears in Tom Clancy's EndWar as the European Union's southernmost missile defense uplinks.

== See also ==
- University of Thessaly
- Vale of Tempe
- List of traditional Greek place names
- CERETETH, Center of Technology Thessaly

== Sources ==
- Fine, John V. A. Jr. (1991) [1983]. The Early Medieval Balkans: A Critical Survey from the Sixth to the Late Twelfth Century. Ann Arbor: University of Michigan Press. ISBN 0-472-08149-7.
- Fine, John V. A. (1994) [1987]. The Late Medieval Balkans: A Critical Survey from the Late Twelfth Century to the Ottoman Conquest. Ann Arbor, Michigan: University of Michigan Press. ISBN 978-0-472-10079-8.
- Kazhdan, Alexander (1991). "Vlachia". In Kazhdan, Alexander (ed.). The Oxford Dictionary of Byzantium. Oxford and New York: Oxford University Press. ISBN 0-19-504652-8.
- Savvides, Alexis G. C. (2000). "Tesalya". In Bearman, P. J.; Bianquis, Th.; Bosworth, C. E.; van Donzel, E. & Heinrichs, W. P. (eds.). The Encyclopaedia of Islam, Second Edition. Volume X: T–U. Leiden: E. J. Brill. pp. 420–422. ISBN 978-90-04-11211-7.
