= Peloponnese (region) =

Administrative region of Greece

Peloponnese Περιφέρεια Πελοποννήσου
- Administrative region
- Coordinates: 37°24′N 22°18′E
- Country: Greece
- Decentralized Administration: Peloponnese, Western Greece and the Ionian
- Capital: Tripoli
- Largest city: Kalamata
- Regional units: List: Arcadia; Argolis; Corinthia; Laconia; Messinia

Government
  - Governor: Dimitris Ptochos (New Democracy)

Area
  - Total: 15,489.96 km^{2} (5,980.71 sq mi)

Population (2021)
  - Total: 539,535
  - Density: 34.8313/km^{2} (90.2126/sq mi)
- Demonym: Peloponnesian

GDP
  - Total: €10.483 billion (2024)
  - Per capita: €19,817 (2024)
- Time zone: UTC+2 (EET)
  - Summer (DST): UTC+3 (EEST)
- ISO 3166 code: GR-J
- HDI (2023): 0.892 very high · 6th of 13
- Website: ppel.gov.gr

The Peloponnese Region (Greek: Περιφέρεια Πελοποννήσου, romanized: Periféria Peloponnísou, [periˈferia pelopoˈnisu]) is a region in southern Greece. It borders Western Greece to the north and Attica to the north-east. The region has an area of about 15,490 square kilometres (5,980 square miles). It covers most of the Peloponnese peninsula, except for the northwestern subregions of Achaea and Elis which belong to Western Greece and a small portion of the Argolid peninsula that is part of Attica.

== Administration ==
The Peloponnese Region was established in the 1987 administrative reform. With the 2011 Kallikratis plan, its powers and authority were redefined and extended. Along with the Western Greece and Ionian Islands regions, it is supervised by the Decentralized Administration of Peloponnese, Western Greece and the Ionian Islands based at Patras.

The region is based at Tripoli and is divided into five regional units (pre-Kallikratis prefectures),

- Arcadia,
- Argolis,
- Corinthia,
- Laconia and
- Messenia,

which are further subdivided into 26 municipalities. The largest city of the region is Kalamata.

== Major communities ==
- Kalamáta (Καλαμάτα) (population 2021: 72,906)
- Trípoli (Τρίπολη) (population 2021: 44,165)
- Árgos (Άργος) (population 2011: 42,027)
- Kórinthos (Κόρινθος) (Corinth in English) (population 2011: 38,132)
- Spárti (Σπάρτη) (population 2023: 35,259)
- Nafplio (Ναύπλιο) (population 2011: 33,356)
- Trifylía (Τριφυλία) (population 2011: 27,373)
- Messíni (Μεσσήνη) (population 2011: 23,482)
- Monemvasiá (Μονεμβασιά) (population 2011: 21,942)
- Xylókastro (Ξυλόκαστρο) (population 2011: 13,277)

== Demographics ==
The region has shrunk by 41,537 people between 2011 and 2021, experiencing a population loss of 6.8%.

== Economy ==
The Gross domestic product (GDP) of the region was 8.2 billion € in 2018, accounting for 4.5% of Greek economic output. GDP per capita adjusted for purchasing power was 17,400 € or 57% of the EU27 average in the same year. The GDP per employee was 68% of the EU average.
