= Central Greece (administrative region) =

Administrative region of Greece

Central Greece Περιφέρεια Στερεάς Ελλάδας
- Administrative region of Greece
- Logo

- Coordinates: 38.7°N 22.7°E
- Country: Greece
- Decentralized Administration: Thessaly and Central Greece
- Capital: Lamia
- Largest city: Chalcis
- Regional units: List: Boeotia; Euboea; Evrytania; Phocis; Phthiotis

Government
  - Governor: Fanis Spanos (New Democracy)

Area
  - Total: 15,549.31 km^{2} (6,003.62 sq mi)

Population (2021)
  - Total: 508,254
  - Density: 32.6866/km^{2} (84.6579/sq mi)

GDP
  - Total: €10.718 billion (2024)
  - Per capita: €21,140 (2024)
- Time zone: UTC+02:00 (EET)
  - Summer (DST): UTC+03:00 (EEST)
- ISO 3166 code: GR-H
- HDI (2023): 0.897 very high · 3rd of 13
- Website: www.pste.gov.gr

Central Greece is one of the thirteen administrative regions of Greece. The region occupies the eastern part of the traditional region of Central Greece, including the island of Euboea. To the south it borders the regions of Attica and the Peloponnese, to the west the region of Western Greece, to the north the region of Thessaly and to the northwest it shares a small border with Epirus. Its capital city is Lamia and the largest city is Chalcis.

== Administration ==
The region was established in the 1987 administrative reform. With the 2010 Kallikratis plan, its powers and authority were redefined and extended. Along with Thessaly, it is supervised by the Decentralized Administration of Thessaly and Central Greece based at Larissa. The region is based at Lamia and is divided into five regional units : Boeotia, Euboea, Evrytania, Phocis and Phthiotis, which are further subdivided into 25 municipalities.

== Economy ==
The Gross domestic product (GDP) of the province was 8.8 billion € in 2018, accounting for 4.7% of the Greek economic output. GDP per capita adjusted for purchasing power was €18,900 or 63% of the EU27 average in the same year. The GDP per employee was 81% of the EU average. Central Greece is the region in Greece with the fourth-highest GDP per capita.

== Demographics ==
The region has shrunk by 42,121 people between 2011 and 2021, experiencing a population loss of 7.7%.

== Communities ==
All communities in each regional unit with over 2,000 people in the municipal unit or municipality, according to the census of 2011 or 2021 in some cases:

	Regional unit	Capital	Area (km^{2})	Population
	Boeotia	Livadeia	2,952	117,920
1	Thebes			22,883
2	Livadeia			22,193
3	Tanagra			18,500
4	Schimatari			7,173
5	Orchomenos			5,238
6	Oinofyta			4,903
7	Aliartos			4,847
8	Plataies			3,602
9	Thespies			3,386
10	Vagia			3,248
11	Distomo			3,192
12	Arachova			2,770
13	Koroneia			2,609
14	Thisvi			2,367
15	Kyriaki			2,298
	Euboea	Chalcis	4,167	210,815
1	Chalcis			59,125
2	Karystos			11,903
3	Nea Artaki			9,489
4	Vasiliko			6,571
5	Eretria			6,330
6	Psachna			6,050
7	Drosia			5,950
8	Istiaia			5,522
9	Aliveri			5,249
10	Karystos			5,121
11	Loutra Aidipsou			4,519
12	Vathy			4,098
13	Amarynthos			3,672
14	Agios Nikolaos			3,426
15	Paralia Avlidas			3,115
16	Kymi			2,870
17	Nea Lampsakos			2,196
18	Limni			2,046
19	Gymno			2,033
	Evrytania	Karpenisi	1,869	20,081
1	Karpenisi			7,348
2	Agrafa			5,983
	Phocis	Amfissa	2,120	40,343
1	Amfissa			6,919
2	Itea			4,362
3	Lidoriki			3,072
4	Tolofon			2,484
5	Galaxidi			2,011
	Phthiotis	Lamia	4,441	158,231
1	Lamia			52,006
2	Stylida			11,389
3	Domokos			9,159
4	Atalanti			5,199
5	Malesina			4,427
6	Molos			3,611
7	Ypati			3537
8	Roditsa			3,509
9	Amfikleia			3,191
10	Agios Konstantinos			2,886
11	Kamena Vourla			2,796
12	Spercheiada			2,691
13	Livanates			2,559
14	Stavros			2,489
15	Elateia			2,372
16	Makrakomi			2,245
Total	Central Greece	Lamia	15,549	547,390
