= List of power stations in Greece =

== Hydroelectric ==
Station	Site	Coordinates	Capacity (MW)
Kastraki Dam	Kastraki	38°44′30.69″N 21°21′51.05″E	320
Kremasta Dam	Kremasta Sykias	38.8839511°N 21.4937961°E	437
Ladon Dam	Arcadia	37.7577°N 21.9716°E	50
Mesochora Dam	Mesochora	39°27′51.86″N 21°18′15.08″E	
Plastiras Dam	Karditsa	39.235556°N 21.746389°E	130
Stratos Dam	Stratos	38.6758027°N 21.3258898°E	150
Sykia Dam	Karditsa/Arta	39°18′47.98″N 21°24′46.67″E	
Thisavros Dam	Drama	41.354444°N 24.366944°E	384

== Thermal ==
Name	Location	Coordinates	Fuel	Capacity, MWe	Operational	Notes
Agios Nikolaos Power Station	Aghios Nikolaos, Beotia		Natural gas	1604	2008	
Agios Dimitrios Power Station	Agios Dimitrios, Kozani	40.394°N 21.925°E	Lignite	1500	1984-2026	
Agios Georgios Power Station	Keratsini	37.95429°N 23.61023°E	Natural gas, oil	360	1968-2016	
Aliveri Power Station	Aliveri	38.38953°N 24.05174°E	Natural gas	417	2013	
Amyntaio Power Station	Amyntaio	40.6193112°N 21.6829133°E	Lignite	600	1996-2020	
Atherinolakkos Power Station	Atherinolakkos	35.0039°N 26.13916°E	Natural gas, oil	204	2004-	
Chania Power Station	Chania	35°29′18.3″N 24°2′19.4″E	Heavy oil	341	1994-	
Florina Power Station (Melíti Power Station)	Melíti	40.811°N 21.601°E	Lignite	330	2003-2025	
Kardia Power Station	Kardia	40.41°N 21.786°E	Lignite	1200	1975-2021	
Komotini Power Station	Komotini	41.064°N 25.49°E	Natural gas	485	2002-	
Lavrio Power Station	Lavrio	37.74629°N 24.06688°E	Natural gas	914	1997-	
Linoperamata Power Station	Linoperamata	35.340420°N 25.052032°E	Natural gas, oil	314	1974-	
Megalapolis Power Station	Megalopolis	37.418°N 22.109°E	Natural gas, oil	846	2008-	
Ptolemaida Power Station	Ptolemaida	40.4808629°N 21.7269015°E	Lignite	660	2023-	
Soronis Power Station	Soronis	36.37842°N 28.0184°E	Oil	403	1976-	
Thisvi Power station	Thisvi	38.236243°N 22.949866°E	Natural gas	410	2010	

== Photovoltaic ==
=== Current ===
Greece's largest photovoltaic (PV) power plants
Location	Capacity	Description	Constructed
Kozani	204 MW	Park of Kozani	2022
Naoussa	7+7 MW	Photovoltaic plants cluster	2013
Florina	4.3 MW	Florina industrial zone	2009
Volos	2 MW	Photovoltaic power plant Volos	2009
Thebes	2 MW	Photovoltaic power plant Thebes	2009
Koutsopodi	1.997 MW		2009
Tripoli	1.99 MW		2009
Pournari	1.25 MW		2009
Iliopenditiki	1 MW		2009
Pontoiraklia	944 kW		2009
Kythnos	100 kW		2009
Sifnos	60 kW		1998
Tavros, ILPAP Building	20 kW		2009
Ethel Station	20 kW		2009
Maroussi, Eirini metro station	20 kW		2009

=== Future ===
Greece's largest photovoltaic (PV) power plants
Location	Capacity	Description	Constructed
Ptolemaida	550MW	Lignite Centre of Western Macedonia	To commence operation in 2025
Amyntaio	450MW	Western Macedonia	To commence operation in 2025
Thessaly	390MW	Park of Argyromylos	-
Megalopoli	50 MW	Park of Megalopoli	-
Crete	0.48 MW	Park of Atherinolakos	-

== See also ==
- Energy in Greece
- Renewable energy in Greece
- Wind power in Greece
- Solar power in the European Union
- Solar power in Greece
