= Stratos Dam =

Stratos Hydroelectric Dam Ηδροηλεκτρικό Φράγμα Στράτου
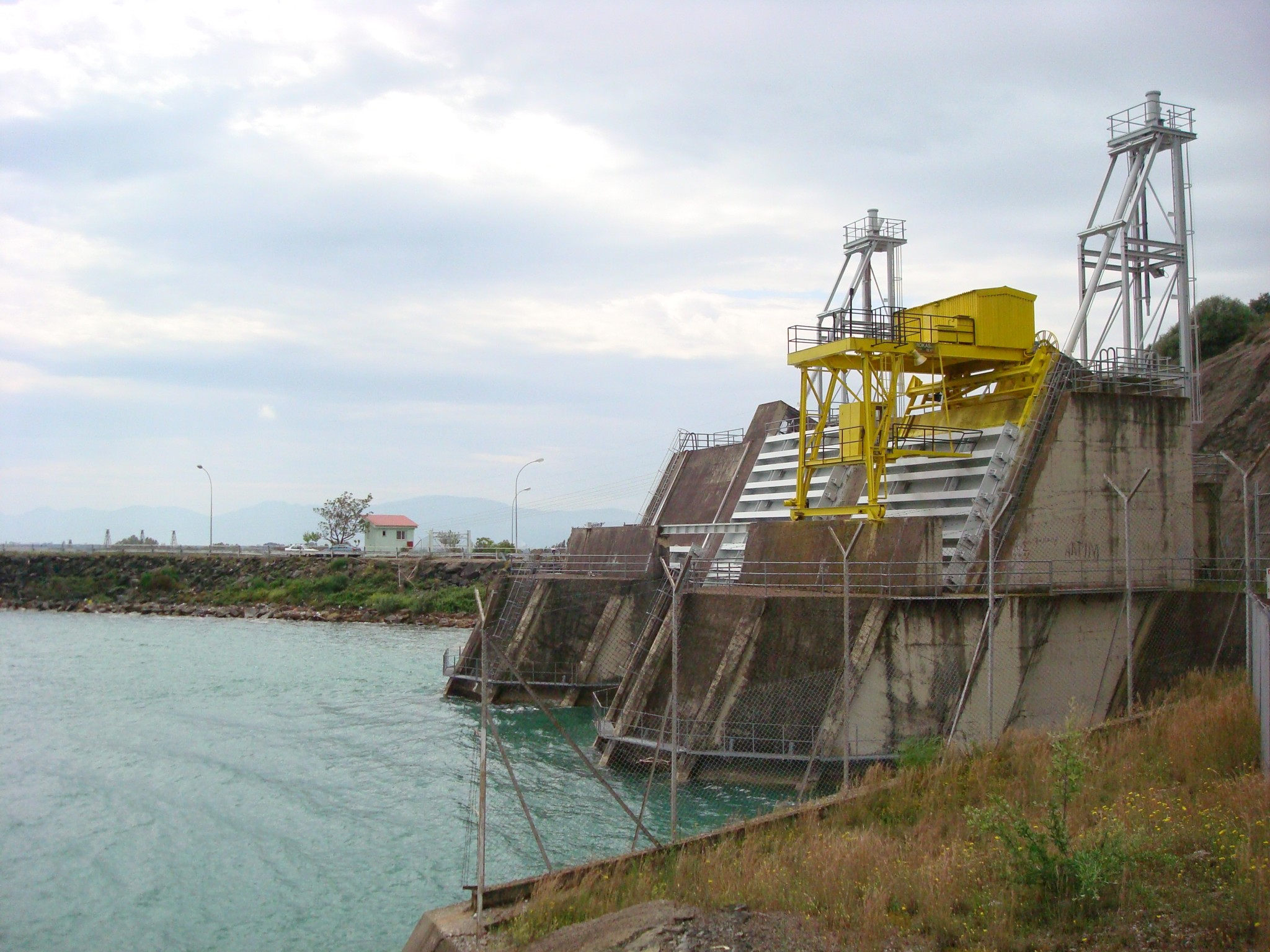
- Stratos Hydroelectric Dam

- Location within Greece
- Country: Greece
- Location: Stratos, Aitoloakarnania
- Coordinates: 38°40′33″N 21°20′10″E
- Purpose: Power, irrigation
- Status: Operational
- Construction began: 1981
- Opening date: 1989
- Owner: Public Power Corporation of Greece

Dam and spillways
- Type of dam: Embankment, earth-fill
- Impounds: Acheloos River
- Height: 26 m (85 ft)
- Length: 1,900 m (6,200 ft)
- Dam volume: 2,800,000 m^{3} (3,700,000 cu yd)

Reservoir
- Creates: Stratos artificial lake
- Total capacity: 11,000,000 m^{3} (8,900 acre⋅ft)
- Catchment area: 4,320 km^{2} (1,670 mi^{2})
- Surface area: 8.4 km^{2} (3.2 mi^{2})

Power Station
- Commission date: 1988-1989
- Turbines: 2 x 75 MW Francis-type; 2 x 3.35 MW S-turbine
- Installed capacity: 156.7 MW
- Annual generation: 237 GWh

The Stratos Hydroelectric Dam (Greek: Υδροηλεκτρικό Φράγμα Στράτου) is a dam on the river Acheloos in Aetolia-Acarnania, western Greece. It is situated just east of the village Stratos, and 9 km northwest of Agrinio. The dam created the Stratos artificial lake. There are four more dams upstream from the Stratos Dam: the Kastraki Dam, the Kremasta Dam, the Sykia Dam and the Mesochora Dam.

The dam was constructed between 1981 and 1989. Four turbine units produce up to 156.7 MW of electricity.

== See also ==
- List of lakes in Greece
- Renewable energy in Greece
