= Kastraki =

Kastraki may refer to several places in Greece:

- Kastraki, Aetolia-Acarnania, a village in the municipal unit Stratos, Aetolia-Acarnania
- Kastraki, Arcadia, a village in the municipal unit Tropaia, Arcadia
- Kastraki, Corinthia, a village in the municipal unit Nemea, Corinthia
- Kastraki, Kastoria, a municipal unit in Kastoria regional unit
- Kastraki, Phocis, a village in the municipal unit Efpalio, Phocis
- Kastraki, Trikala, a village in the municipal unit Kalampaka, Trikala regional unit
- Kastraki (lake), an artificial lake in Aetolia-Acarnania
- Kastraki Beach and village on Naxos, Cyclades
