= Stratos (lake) =

Lake Stratos
- Τ. Λίμνη Στράτου (Greek)
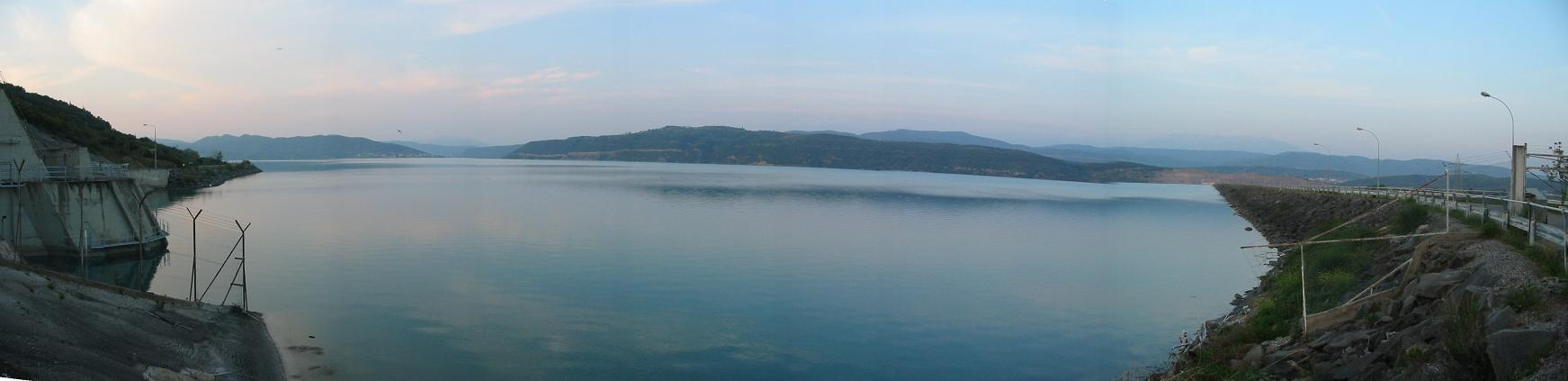

- Location within Greece
- Coordinates: 38°41′N 21°20′E
- Type: reservoir
- Primary inflows: Acheloos River
- Primary outflows: Acheloos River
- Basin countries: Greece
- Surface area: 7.4 km^{2} (2.9 sq mi)
- Water volume: 0.080 km^{3} (65,000 acre⋅ft)
- Surface elevation: 68 m (223 ft)

Lake Stratos (Greek: Λίμνη Στράτου) is an artificial lake near Stratos in Aetolia-Acarnania, western Greece. The lake is fed and drained by the river Acheloos. It was formed by the Stratos Dam, completed in 1989. Its maximum capacity is 80,000,000 m³ of water. Its area is 7.4 km^{2}. It is used for the generation of hydroelectric power.

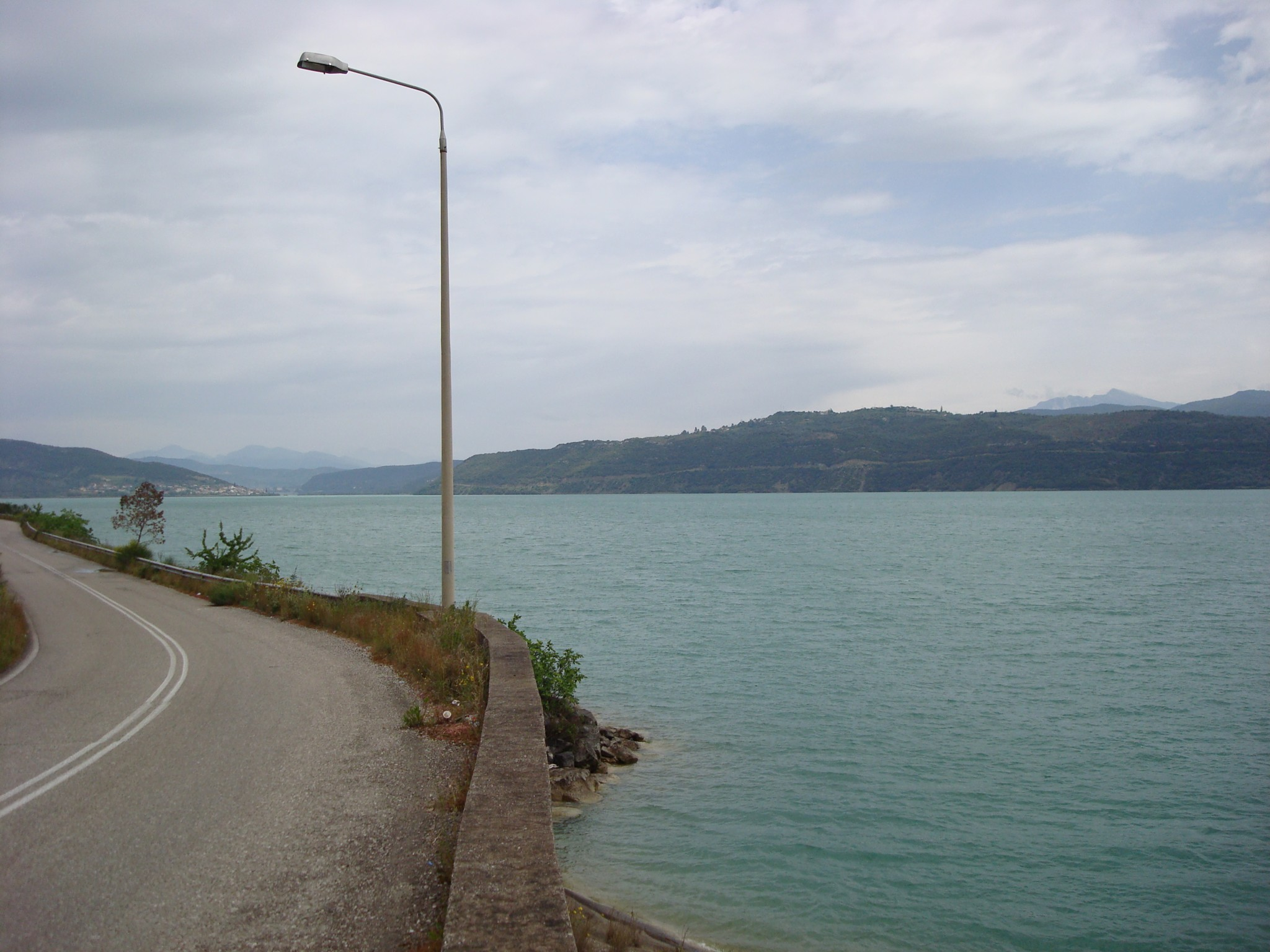
Stratos artificial lake
