= Mesochora Dam =

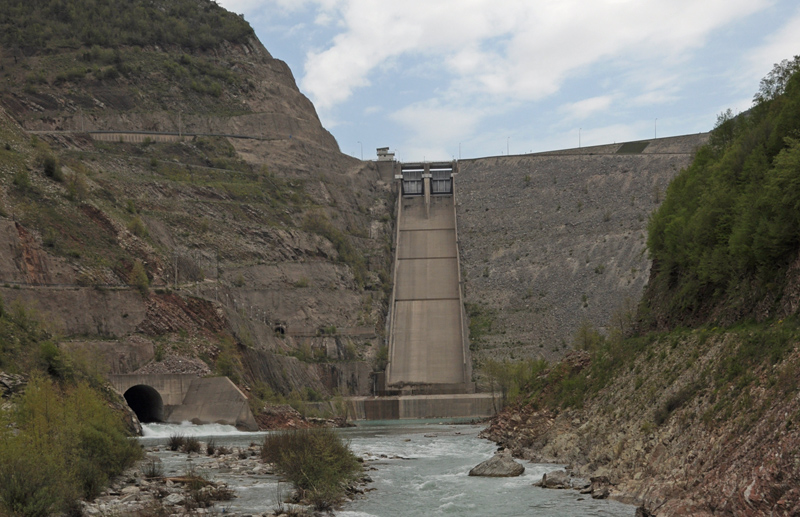
- Spillway of Mesochora Dam

- Location within Greece
- Country: Greece
- Location: Mesochora, Trikala
- Coordinates: 39°27′51.86″N 21°18′15.08″E
- Purpose: River diversion, irrigation, power
- Status: Complete, not commissioned
- Construction began: 1996
- Opening date: 2001
- Owner: Public Power Corporation of Greece

Dam and spillways
- Type of dam: Embankment, earth-fill
- Impounds: Acheloos River
- Height: 150 m (490 ft)
- Length: 340 m (1,120 ft)
- Dam volume: 5,000,000 m^{3} (6,500,000 cu yd)

Reservoir
- Total capacity: 358,000,000 m^{3} (290,000 acre⋅ft)
- Surface area: 7.8 km^{2} (3.0 mi^{2})

Power Station
- Type: Conventional
- Turbines: 2 x 81 MW Francis-type (planned)
- Installed capacity: 162 MW (planned)

The Mesochora Dam is concrete-face rock-fill dam on the Acheloos River near Mesochora in Trikala, Greece. The 150 m (490 ft) tall dam is part of the Acheloos River Diversion which is intended to divert a portion of the Acheloos west to irrigate 240,000–380,000 ha (590,000–940,000 acres) in the Thessaly plains. The project includes the Mesochora, Sykia, Mouzaki and Pyli Dams along with a 17.4 km (10.8 mi) long channel.

The idea for an Acheloos to Thessaly diversion project was first envisioned in the 1930s but a lack of funding precluded construction. Interest in the project was revived in 1984 and what was supposed to be a small dam at Mesochora apart from the diversion project was increased in size to support to river diversion. Over the next several years there was a series of legal battles that led to construction stalling, most recently in 2005. Opponents of the scheme cite significant changes to the environment, flooding of villages and that the scheme will divert 600,000,000 m^{3} (490,000 acre⋅ft) of water annually from the Acheloos. Supporters call on the benefit to the lucrative cotton crops it will help irrigate and the dam's planned 162 MW hydroelectric power plant. The Mesochora Dam was completed in January 2001 but the reservoir has yet to be filled and the power plant has subsequently not been commissioned due to legal battles.

== See also ==
- Energy in Greece
- Renewable energy in Greece
