= Thisavros Dam =

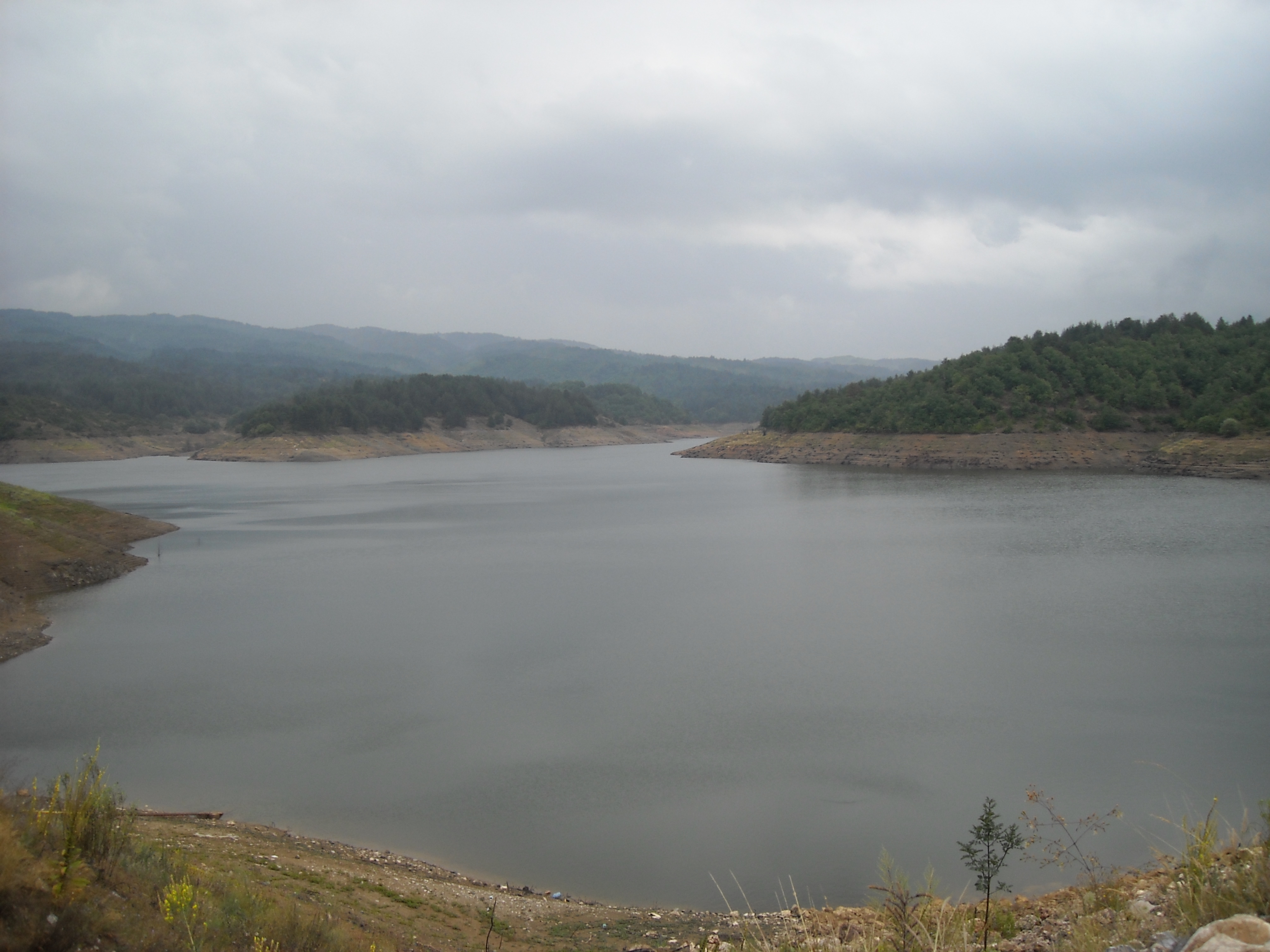
- The dam's reservoir

- Location within Greece
- Official name: Φράγμα Θησαυρού
- Country: Greece
- Location: Nikiforos
- Coordinates: 41°21′16″N 24°22′01″E
- Status: Operational
- Construction began: 1986
- Opening date: 1996
- Construction cost: GRDΔρχ240 billion
- Owner: Public Power Corporation of Greece

Dam and spillways
- Type of dam: Embankment, rock-fill clay-core
- Impounds: Nestos River
- Height: 172 m (564 ft)
- Length: 480 m (1,570 ft)
- Elevation at crest: 390 m (1,280 ft)
- Dam volume: 12,000,000 m^{3} (16,000,000 cu yd)
- Spillway type: Controlled, three chutes
- Spillway capacity: 7,500 m^{3}/s (260,000 cu ft/s)

Reservoir
- Total capacity: 705,000,000 m^{3} (572,000 acre⋅ft)
- Active capacity: 565,000,000 m^{3} (458,000 acre⋅ft)
- Catchment area: 3,693 km^{2} (1,426 mi^{2})
- Surface area: 18 km^{2} (7 mi^{2})

Power Station
- Commission date: 1996-1997
- Turbines: 3 x 128 MW (172,000 hp) MW reversible Francis-type
- Installed capacity: 384 MW (515,000 hp)
- Annual generation: 440 GWh (1,600 TJ)

The Thisavros Dam (Greek: Φράγμα Θησαυρού) is a rock-fill dam on the Nestos River in the regional unit of Drama in the northeastern portion of Greece. it is 21 kilometres (13 mi) north of Nikiforos and 21 kilometres (13 mi) northeast of the town of Drama. The 172-metre (564 ft) high dam is the tallest in Greece. It was constructed between 1986 and 1996. The purpose of the dam is irrigation and hydroelectric power production. Its reservoirs helps irrigate 80,937 hectares (200,000 acres) and its power station has an installed capacity of 384 megawatts (515,000 hp). The power station is a pumped-storage type which allows it to not only generate power but the turbines can reverse and pump water back into the reservoir. Power generation occurs during periods of high demand and pumping during those of low demand such as at night.

== See also ==
- List of power stations in Greece
- Renewable energy in Greece
