= Chalcis (Epirus) =

Coordinates: 39°40′50″N 21°12′32″E

Chalcis or Chalkis (Ancient Greek: Χαλκίς) was a town of ancient Epirus in Mount Pindus, near which the Achelous River rises. It is erroneously called by Stephanus of Byzantium a town of Aetolia.

Its site is tentatively identified as near Khaliki.
