= Kremasta Dam =

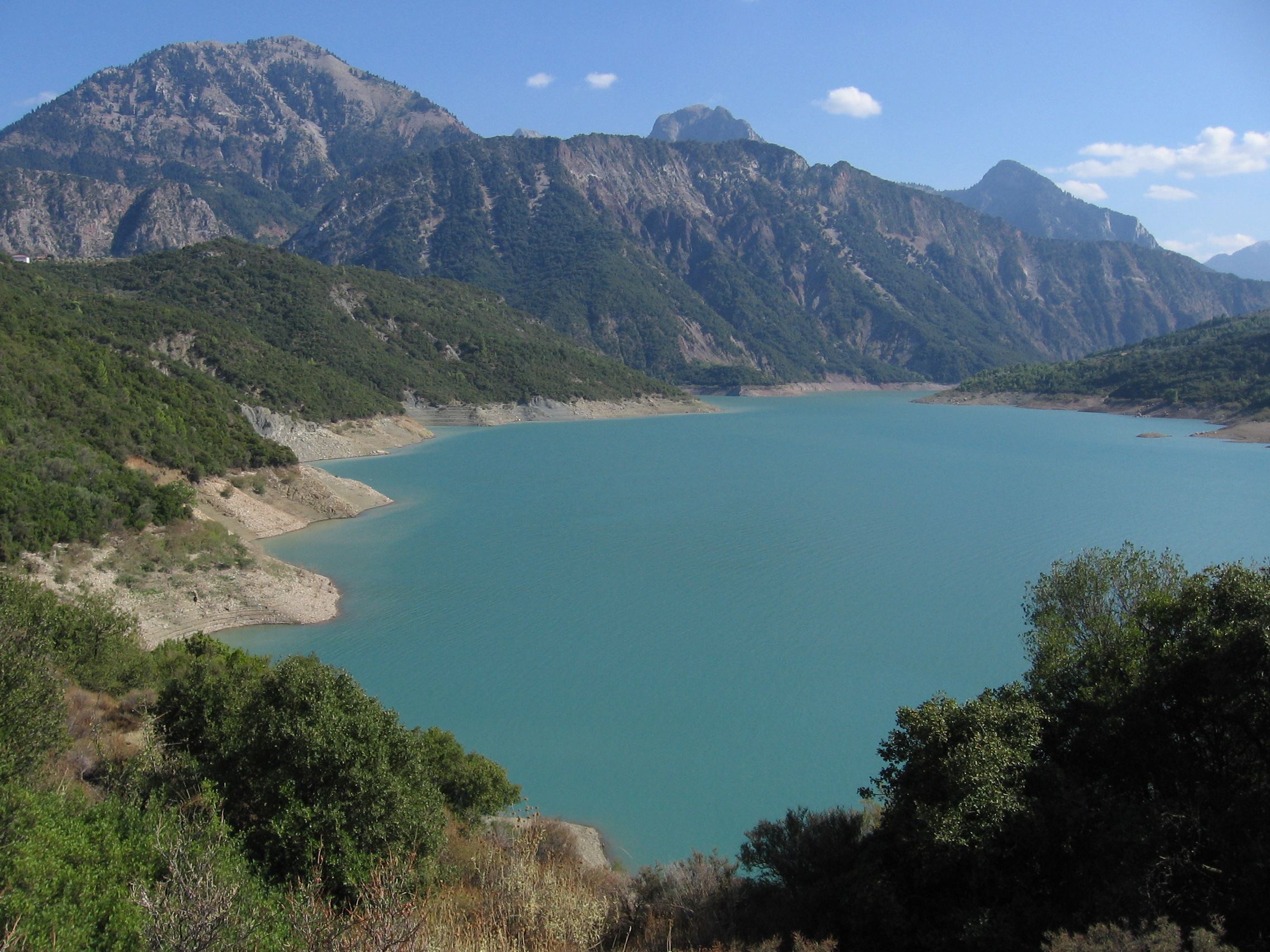
- Kremasta Lake

- Location within Greece
- Country: Greece
- Location: Aetolia-Acarnania
- Coordinates: 38°53′13.20″N 21°29′43.17″E
- Purpose: Power, flood control
- Status: Operational
- Construction began: 1961
- Opening date: 1965
- Owner: Public Power Corporation of Greece

Dam and spillways
- Type of dam: Embankment, earth-fill
- Impounds: Achelous River
- Height: 165 m (541 ft)
- Length: 456 m (1,496 ft)
- Elevation at crest: 287 m (942 ft)
- Dam volume: 8,170,000 m^{3} (10,685,957 cu yd)
- Spillway type: Chute

Reservoir
- Creates: Lake Kremasta
- Total capacity: 4,750,000,000 m^{3} (3,850,888 acre⋅ft)
- Catchment area: 3,750 km^{2} (1,448 mi^{2})
- Surface area: 81 km^{2} (31 mi^{2})

Power Station
- Commission date: 1966-1967
- Type: Conventional
- Turbines: 4 x 109.3 MW Francis-type
- Installed capacity: 437.2 MW
- Annual generation: 848 GWh

The Kremasta Dam is an earth-fill embankment dam on the Achelous River in Aetolia-Acarnania, Greece. It is located just downstream of where the Agrafiotis, Tavropos and Trikeriotis rivers meet to form the Achelous. The dam was constructed between 1961 and 1965 and its four 109.3 MW Francis turbine-generators were commissioned between 1966 and 1967. Shortly after the dam's reservoir, Lake Kremasta, was filled a 6.3-M_{w} earthquake occurred. This has been attributed to reservoir-induced seismicity. Lake Kremasta is the largest artificial lake in Greece.

== See also ==
- Energy in Greece
- Renewable energy in Greece
