= Achelous River =

River in western Greece

Acheloos
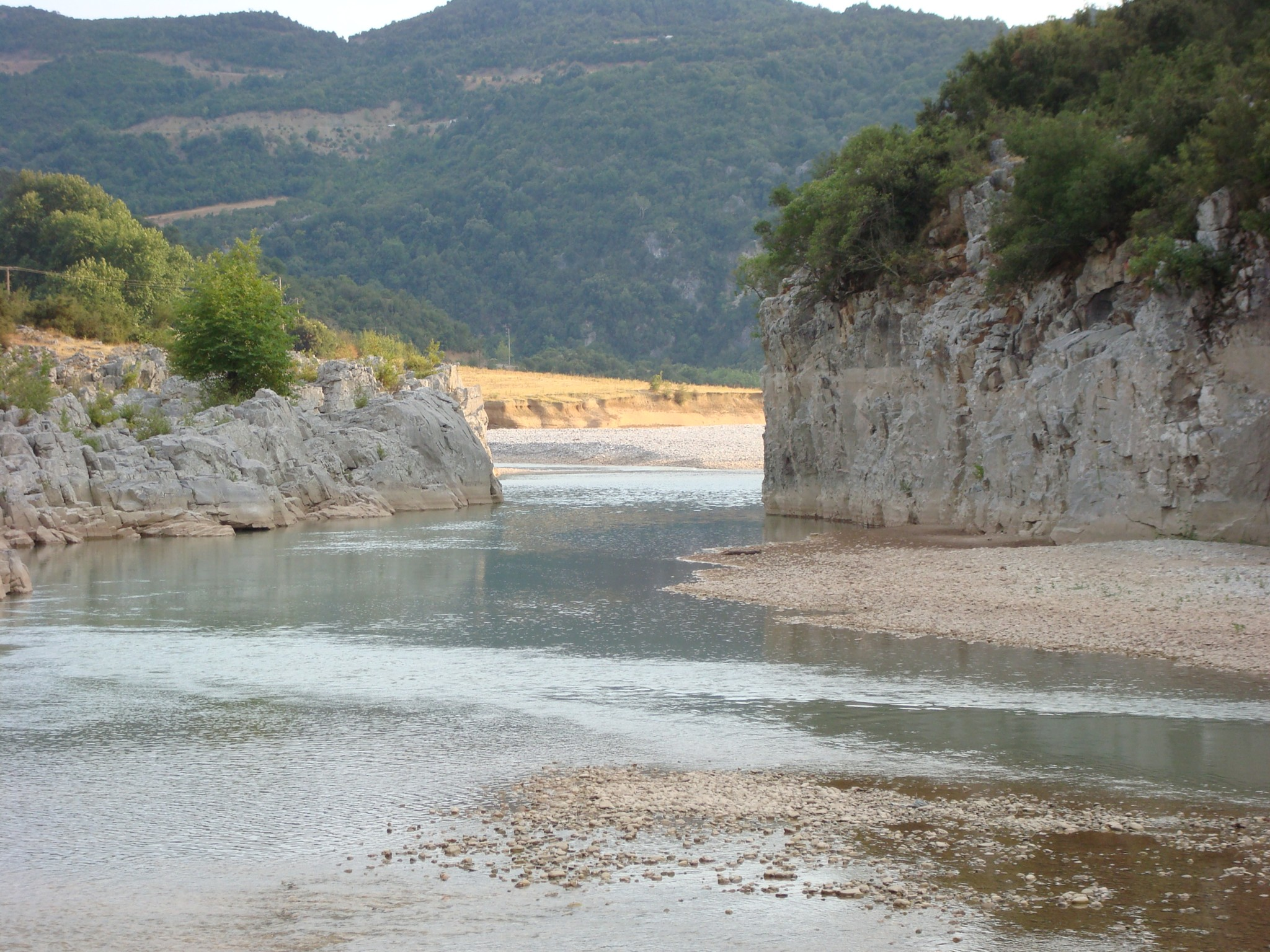

Location
- Country: Greece

Physical characteristics
- Source
  - location: Pindus mountains
  - coordinates: 39°41′13″N 21°8′31″E
- Mouth
  - location: Ionian Sea
  - coordinates: 38°19′53″N 21°6′5″E
- Length: 220 km (140 mi)
- Basin size: 5,472 km^{2} (2,113 sq mi)
- Discharge
  - average: 7,800,000,000 m^{3} (6,323,563 acre⋅ft) (annual mean)

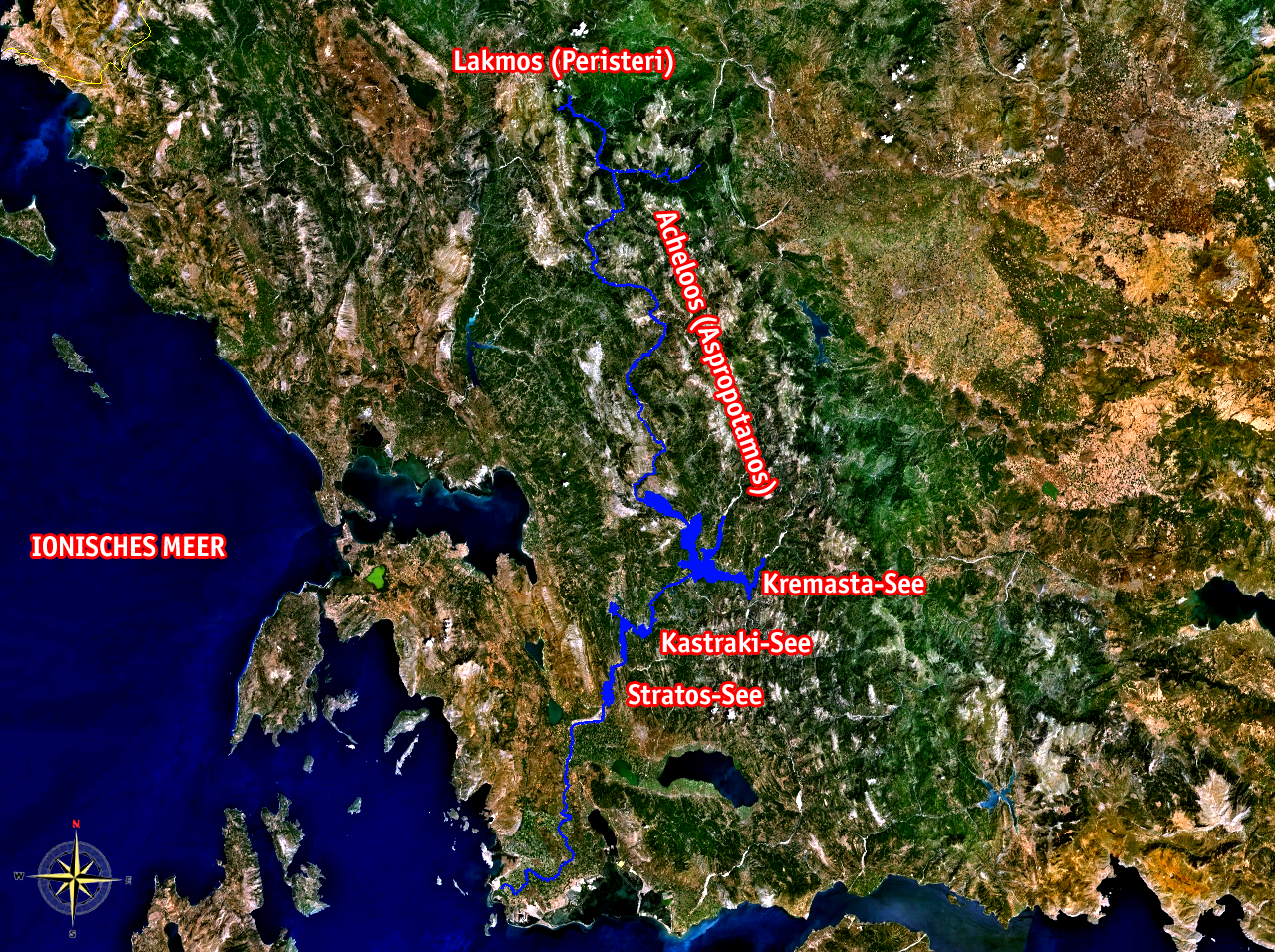
The Acheloos River marked on a satellite image. Labels in German.

The Achelous (Greek: Αχελώος, Ancient Greek: Ἀχελῷος Akhelôios), also Acheloos, is a river in Epirus, western Greece. It is 220 km (137 mi) long. It formed the boundary between Acarnania and Aetolia of antiquity. It empties into the Ionian Sea. In ancient times its spirit was venerated as the river god Achelous.

Herodotus, taking notice of the shoreline-transforming power of the Acheloos River, even compared it to the Nile in this respect:

'There are other rivers as well which, though not as large as the Nile, have had substantial results. In particular (although I could name others), there is the Achelous, which flows through Acarnania into the sea and has already turned half the Echinades islands into mainland.' (2.10, trans. Waterfield)

It is said to have been called more anciently Thoas, Axenus and Thestius.

== Course ==
The river Achelous begins at about 2,000 metres (6,600 ft) elevation on the eastern slope of Lakmos mountain in the Pindus range, near the village Anthousa in the westernmost part of the Trikala regional unit. One of its first tributaries is the Aspropotamos, meaning the white river.

The river flows generally southwards, and forms part of the boundary between the regional units of Arta and Trikala, which is also the boundary between Epirus and Thessaly. Further downstream, it forms the boundary of Arta and Karditsa, and further of Aetolia-Acarnania and Evrytania. The river runs into the Kremasta reservoir, which is also fed by the rivers Agrafiotis and Megdovas.

On exiting the Kremasta reservoir, the river flows southwest into Aetolia-Acarnania, feeding the Kastraki reservoir, west of the Panaitoliko range. 10 to 15 kilometres (6.2 to 9.3 mi) downstream from this lake, it flows into the Stratos reservoir. Further downstream, it runs through the lowlands west of Agrinio. It finally empties into the Ionian Sea, 29 km (18 mi) west of Missolonghi.

== Settlements ==
In order from upstream to downstream:

- Katafyto
- Gardiki
- Mesochora
- Koryfi
- Myrofyllo
- Petroto
- Grimpiana
- Mesopyrgos
- Neo Argyri
- Tripotamo
- Kastraki
- Stratos
- Palaiomanina
- Gouria
- Neochori

=== Dams ===
There are five dams on the river. From upstream to downstream there is the Mesochora Dam which was completed in 2001 but has not impounded its reservoir. Below that is the Sykia Dam which is partly constructed. Further down is the Kremasta (1965), Kastraki (1969) and Stratos Dams (1989).

=== Activities ===
Rafting activities in the river usually take place during spring time with Class 2-3 passages. The most common run begins in Mesochora dam and finishes in Terpna village. Canoeing is practiced in the lower part of the river after the Stratos dam until the mouth of the river in the Ionian sea, mostly during summer and autumn. The best route for canoeing is between Pentalofo village and Neochori.

== Acheloos River in mythology ==
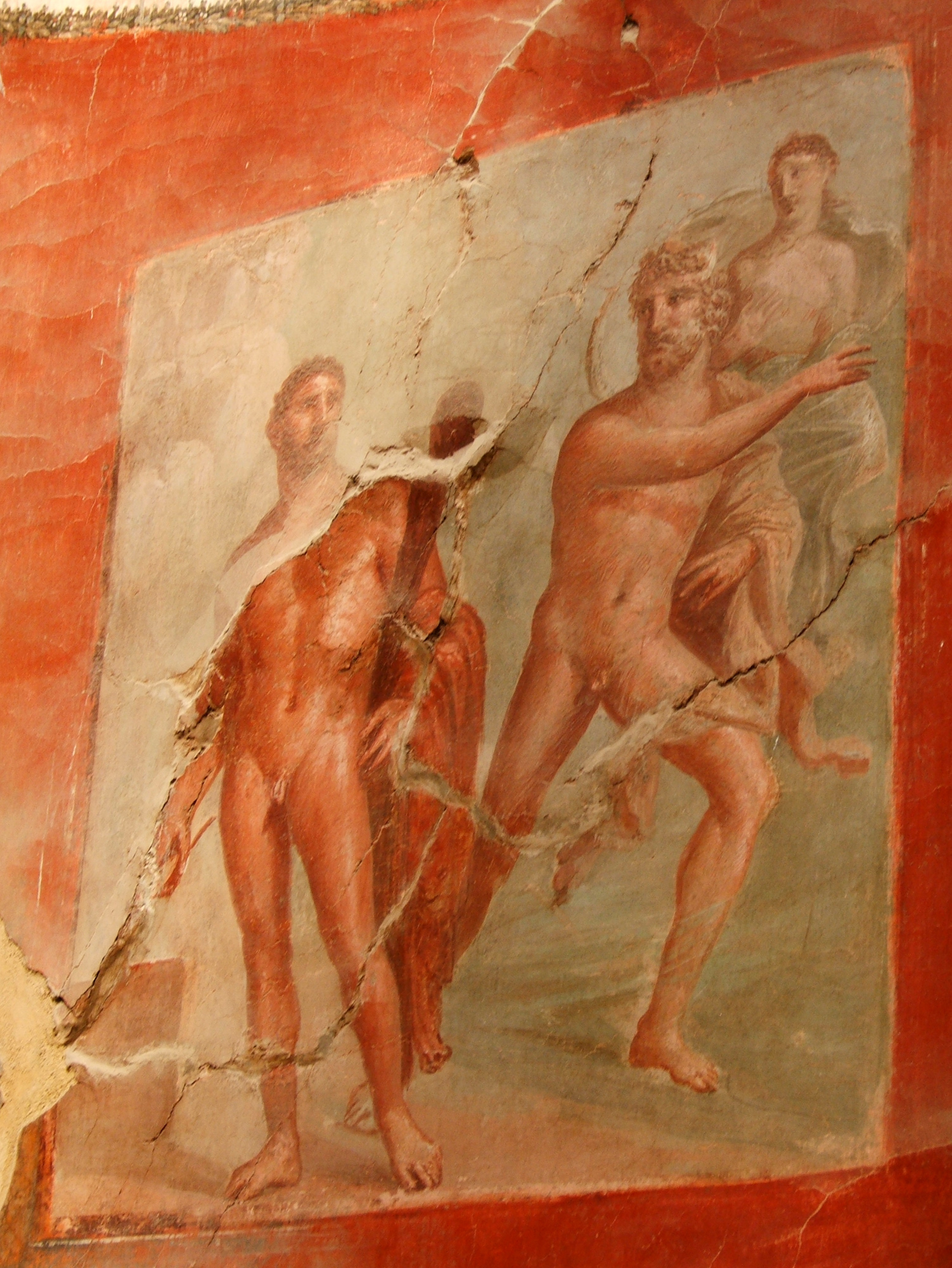
A Roman fresco from Herculaneum depicting Hercules (from Etruscan Hercle and ultimately Greek Herakles) and Achelous (patron deity of the Achelous River in Greece) from Greco-Roman mythology, 1st century AD

== History ==
In antiquity, the Achelous was the largest and most celebrated river in Greece, rising in Mount Pindus, and after flowing through the mountainous country of the Dolopians and Agraeans, entered the plain of Acarnania and Aetolia near Stratus, and discharged itself into the Ionian Sea, near the Acarnanian town of Oeniadae. It subsequently formed the boundary between Acarnania and Aetolia, but in the time of Thucydides the territory of Oeniadae extended east of the river. It is usually called a river of Acarnania, but it is sometimes assigned to Aetolia. Its general direction is from north to south. Its waters are of a whitish yellow or cream colour, whence it derives a later name of Aspropotamo or the White river, and to which Dionysius Periegetes probably alludes in the epithet ἀργυροδίνης. Periegetes places the sources of the river near a place called Chalcis. It is said to have been called more anciently Thoas, Axenus and Thestius. In the lower part of its course, the plain through which it flows was called in antiquity Paracheloitis after the river. This plain was celebrated for its fertility, though covered in great part with marshes, several of which were formed by the overflowings of the Achelous.

In 1359 the Battle of Achelous between Albanian forces under Peter Losha and the Despotate of Epirus under Nikephoros II Orsini took place near the river Achelous. Nikephoros II was defeated and killed during the battle, and two new states were established in the area, the Despotate of Arta and the Despotate of Angelokastron and Lepanto.

In the 1960s, the Kremasta Dam in the Aitoloacarnania-Evrytania boundary was under construction. The area is not forested. The dam, made of concrete, took years to complete, eventually flooding a portion of the western part of the prefecture of Eurytania. The dam includes a power station with transformer lines in the east. The dam powers electricity for the western part of Greece and the central part. It caused some soil erosion in some flooded valleys. The Kastraki Dam is downstream and was completed in 1969. Downstream of Katsiki, the Stratos Dam was completed in 1989. The arch bridges includes the Karafilio and the Ardanovo.

The Acheloos River Diversion project has been the center of debate since the 1980s. It calls for four large dams, the Sykia, Mesochora, Mouzaki and Pyli, along with a 17.4 km-long (10.8 mi) channel. The goal of the project is to divert 600,000,000 m^{3} (490,000 acre⋅ft) annually from the river west towards the Thessaly plains in order to help irrigate 240,000–380,000 ha (590,000–940,000 acres) of mostly cotton crops. Construction on the project has been stalled several times, the latest in 2005, because of environmental and social concerns.
