= Kastraki (lake) =

Artificial lake in Greece

Lake Kastraki
- Τ. Λίμνη Καστρακίου (Greek)
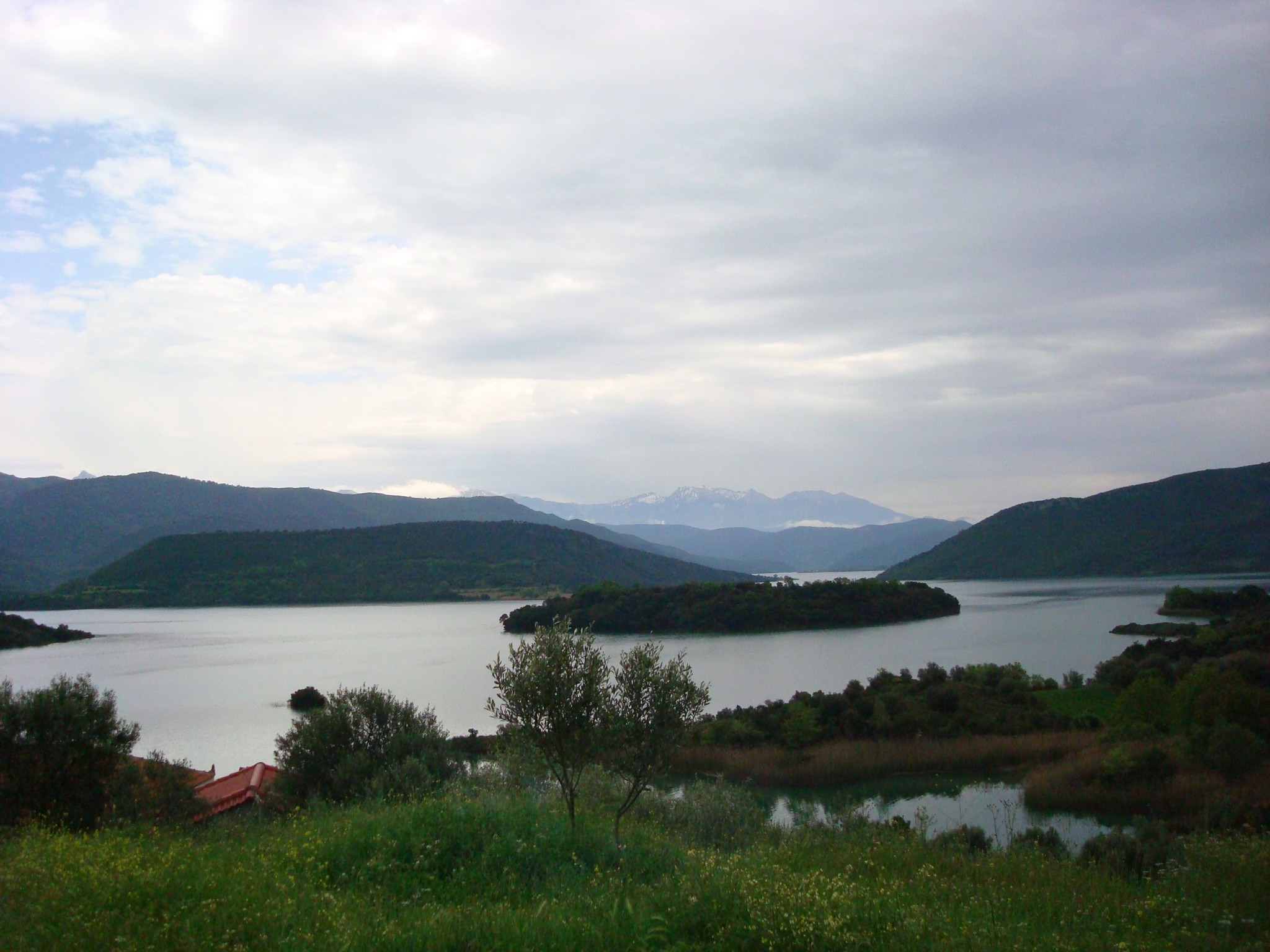

- Location within Greece
- Location: Aetolia-Acarnania, Greece
- Coordinates: 38°48′N 21°22′E
- Type: Artificial Lake
- Primary inflows: Acheloos
- Primary outflows: Acheloos
- Basin countries: Greece
- Surface area: 28 km^{2} (11 sq mi)
- Water volume: 0.95 km^{3} (770,000 acre⋅ft)
- Surface elevation: 144 m (472 ft)

Lake Kastraki (Greek: Λίμνη Καστρακίου) is an artificial lake near Kastraki in Aetolia-Acarnania, western Greece. The lake is drained by the river Acheloos, and fed by the rivers Acheloos and Inachos. It was formed by the Kastraki Dam, completed in 1969. Its area is about 28 km^{2} and its maximum capacity is 950,000,000 m³ of water. It is used for the generation of hydroelectric power by DEI.

== Gallery ==
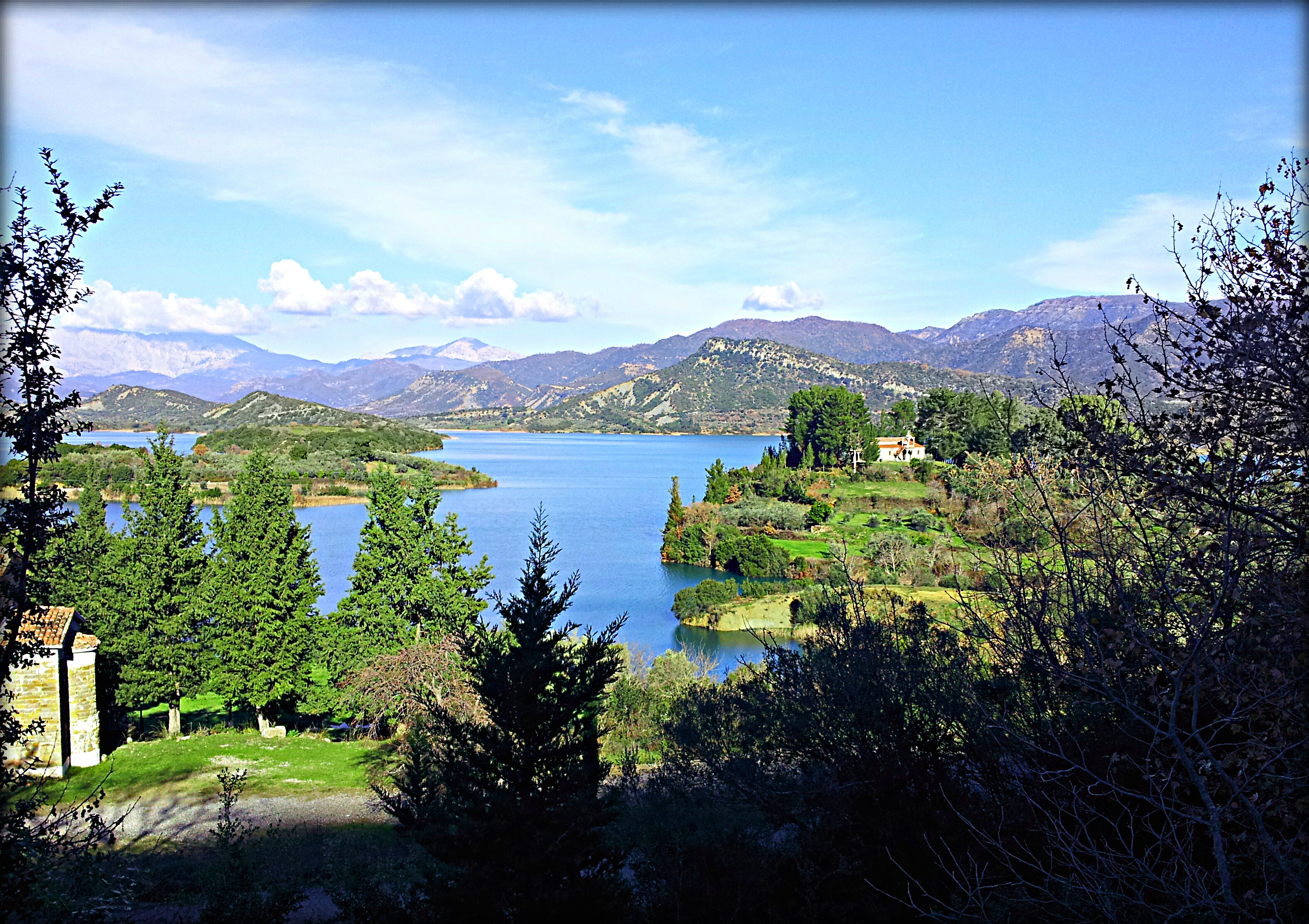
