= Chania Power Station =

Power plant on the island of Crete, Greece

- Country: Greece
- Location: Chania
- Coordinates: 35°29′18.3″N 24°2′19.4″E
- Status: Operational
- Commission date: 1998
- Owner: Public Power Corporation
- Operator: Public Power Corporation

Thermal power station
- Primary fuel: Natural gas

Power generation
- Units operational: 2 X 59 MW
- Nameplate capacity: 120 MW

Chania Power Station is a natural gas power plant located in Chania on Crete island, Greece. It consists of two gas turbine units with a total capacity of about 120 MW. The power station is owned by the Public Power Corporation (PPC).

== History ==
In 1995, PPC awarded the contract for the supply and installation of two turbine units with a capacity of 59 MW each to Ansaldo Energia, a subsidiary of Finmeccanica. The contract was supplemented following works stoppage due to local population impediments, which allowed the erection works to start in April 1997. The first synchronization appeared in March 1998 and the first unit went into commercial operation in May 1998. The second unit went into commercial operation in August 1998.

Greek companies Triton and Rodax participated in the construction of the unit as subcontractors.

== See also ==
- Energy in Greece
