= Kastraki Dam =

Dam in Kastraki, Aitoloakarnania, Greece

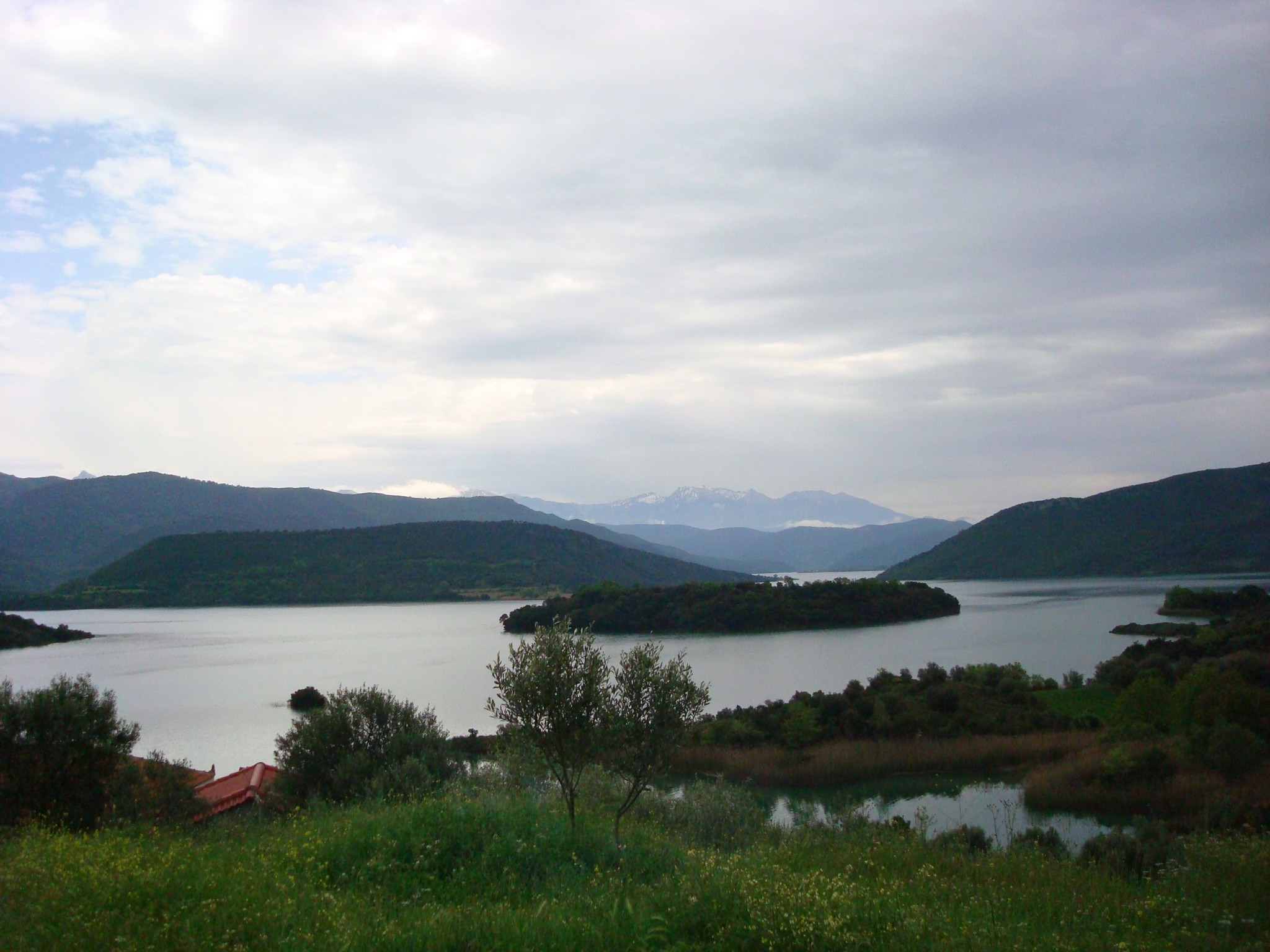
- Kastraki Lake

- Location within Greece
- Country: Greece
- Location: Kastraki, Aitoloakarnania
- Coordinates: 38°44′30.69″N 21°21′51.05″E
- Purpose: Power, flood control, irrigation
- Status: Operational
- Opening date: 1969
- Owner: Public Power Corporation of Greece

Dam and spillways
- Type of dam: Embankment, earth-fill
- Impounds: Achelous River
- Height: 96 m (315 ft)
- Length: 547 m (1,795 ft)
- Dam volume: 5,200,000 m^{3} (6,801,343 cu yd)
- Spillway type: Chute, fuse plug

Reservoir
- Creates: Lake Kastraki
- Total capacity: 785,000,000 m^{3} (636,410 acre⋅ft)
- Catchment area: 4,118 km^{2} (1,590 mi^{2})
- Surface area: 24 km^{2} (9 mi^{2})

Power Station
- Commission date: 1969
- Type: Conventional
- Turbines: 4 x 80 MW Francis-type
- Installed capacity: 320 MW
- Annual generation: 598 GWh

The Kastraki Dam is an earth-fill embankment dam on the Achelous River near the village of Kastraki in Aitoloakarnania, Greece. It was completed in 1969 for the purposes of hydroelectric power generator, flood control and irrigation. The dam's power station houses four 80 MW Francis turbine-generators for an installed capacity of 320 MW. In 2010 the dam's overflow chute spillway was upgraded with 20 fuse plugs which increased the maximum height of the Lake Kastraki reservoir by 1.93 m (6.3 ft) and its storage capacity by 44,000,000 m^{3} (36,000 acre⋅ft).

Terna plans the 680 MW / 5,872 MWh Amphilochia pumped-storage hydroelectricity facility, using Kastraki as the lower reservoir, and a 5 million cubic metre and a 2 million cubic metre as upper reservoirs.

== See also ==
- Energy in Greece
- Renewable energy in Greece
