= Sykia Dam =

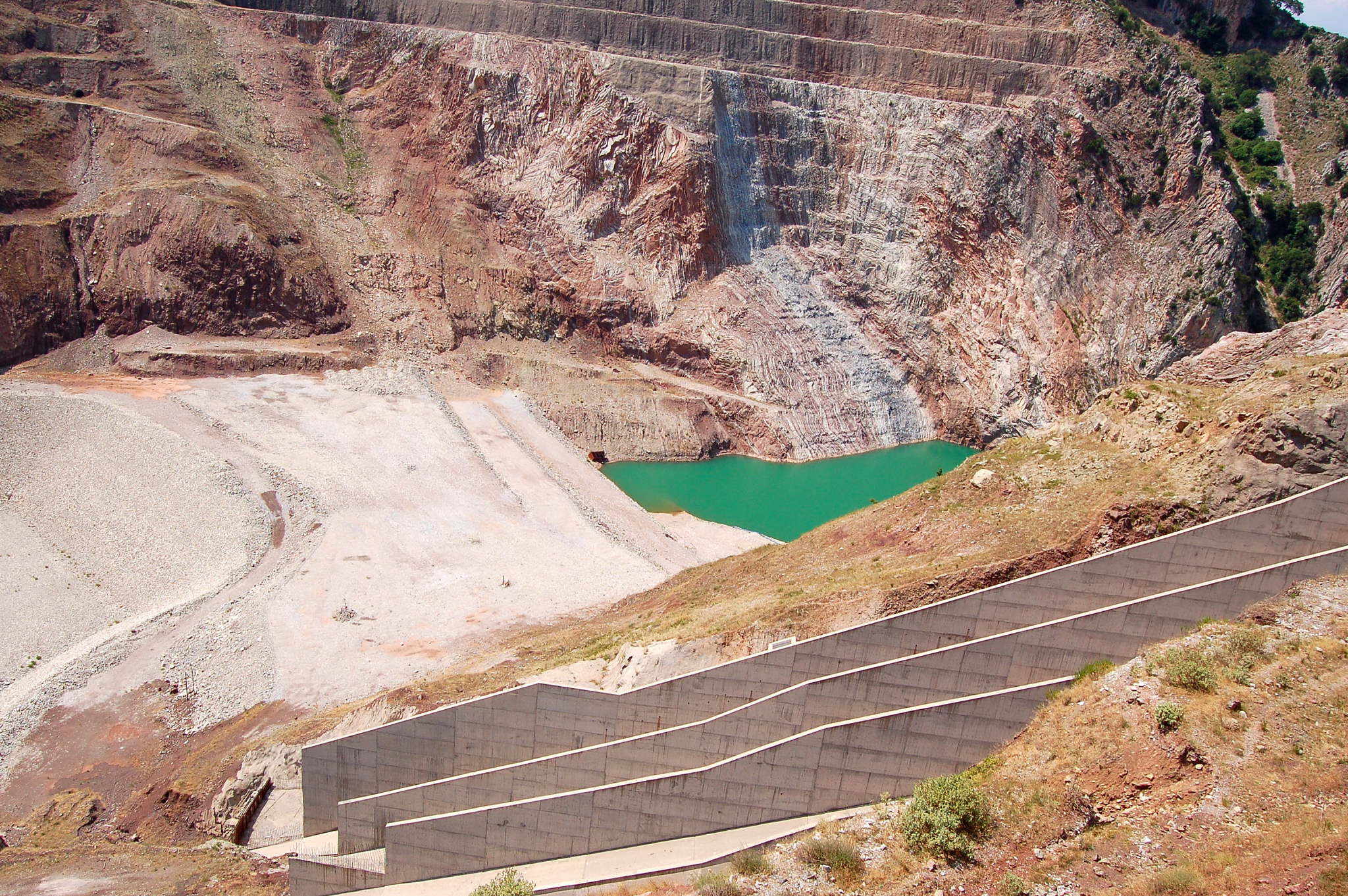

- Location within Greece
- Country: Greece
- Location: Karditsa/Arta
- Coordinates: 39°18′47.98″N 21°24′46.67″E
- Purpose: River diversion, irrigation, power
- Status: Suspended
- Construction began: 1996
- Owner: Ministry for the Environment, Physical Planning and Public Works

Dam and spillways
- Type of dam: Embankment, earth-fill
- Impounds: Acheloos River
- Height: 170 m (560 ft)
- Length: 397 m (1,302 ft)
- Dam volume: 12,000,000 m^{3} (16,000,000 cu yd)

Reservoir
- Total capacity: 502,000,000 m^{3} (407,000 acre⋅ft)
- Surface area: 12.8 km^{2} (4.9 mi^{2})

Power Station
- Type: Conventional
- Turbines: 2 x 60 MW Francis-type (planned)
- Installed capacity: 120 MW (planned)

The Sykia Dam is a mostly constructed but unused earth-filled embankment dam on the Acheloos River along the border of Karditsa and Arta, Greece. The 170 m (560 ft) tall dam is part of the Acheloos River Diversion which is intended to divert a portion of the Acheloos west to irrigate 240,000–380,000 ha (590,000–940,000 acres) in the Thessaly plains. The project includes the Sykia, Messochora, Mouzaki and Pyli Dams along with a 17.4 km (10.8 mi) long channel.

The idea for the Sykia Dam and overall diversion project was first envisioned in the 1930s but a lack of funding precluded construction. Interest in the project was revived in 1984 and construction on the dam began in 1996. Over the next several years there was a series of legal battles that led to final construction stalling, most recently in 2005. Opponents of the scheme cite significant changes to the environment, flooding of villages and that the scheme will divert 600,000,000 m^{3} (490,000 acre⋅ft) of water annually from the Acheloss. Supporters call on the benefit to the lucrative cotton crops it will help irrigate and the dam's planned 120 MW hydroelectric power plant.

== See also ==
- Energy in Greece
- Renewable energy in Greece
