= Kastraki, Phocis =

Village in Greece

Kastraki Καστράκι
- Community
- Location within Greece
- Coordinates: 38°25′2″N 21°53′41″E
- Country: Greece
- Administrative region: Central Greece
- Regional unit: Phocis
- Municipality: Dorida
- Municipal unit: Efpalio

Population (2021)
  - Community: 625
- Time zone: UTC+2 (EET)
  - Summer (DST): UTC+3 (EEST)

Kastraki (Greek: Καστράκι, before 1927: Ομέρ Εφένδη - Omer Efendi) is a village in Phocis, Greece, part of the municipal unit Efpalio. It is near the left bank of the river Mornos and 3 km from the Gulf of Corinth. It is 3 km (2 mi) west of the village of Efpalio and 6 km (4 mi) northeast of the town of Nafpaktos.

== History ==
Kastraki is near the site of the ancient town of Oineon in Ozolian Locris of ancient Greece. Oineon was famous for the temple of Nemean Zeus and the site of Hesiod's death. Hesiod was the second most ancient Greek poet after Homer; he lived between 750 BC and 700 BC. He was born in Ascra of Boeotia and is known as the father of the didactic epic. He spent a good part of his life in Hesperia Locris which inspired him to write his epics. According to the story while Hesiod was a guest at the place of the Nafpaktian priest Ganyctora he insulted his daughter. Her brothers Ktimenos and Antifos killed him in the temple of Nemean Zeus where he asked for asylum. He was buried in all likelihood in Oineon or, as others claim, in Nafpaktos.

Although there is no absolute certainty, many believe that the temple of Nemean Zeus was located where the Orthodox church of Panagia Faneromene is today by the national road and the intersection of the Hiliadou provincial road. In fact, the temple was converted into a Christian church when people of the area accepted Christianity as their new religion. However, others think that the temple was 3 km (2 mi)-4 km (2 mi) east, not west, of Efpalio in the village of New Koukoura where today the church of Analypsis is built.

In the history of ancient Greece, Oineon is referred to in 426 BC when the Athenian General Demosthenes with 30 ships sailed to Locris and camped in Oineon. He planned to bring under the Athenian authority Aitolea and eventually all the areas of Locris and Phokis. Despite some early military success, his gradual but continuous losses of his hoplites forced him to make a treaty with the Aeolians and retreat back to Oineon and Nafpaktos with the remnants of his army. While his remaining army sailed back to Athens, Demosthenes remained in the vicinity of Nafpaktos fearing a punishment by the state of Athens for his failure.

During the 400 years of Turkish occupation, the most fertile lands of Greece were given to prominent Turkish families or officials. As a result, Greeks out of necessity were located in non-prime agricultural lands — mainly mountainous areas where they were not bothered as much by Turkish authorities. Phocis was not any different; Turks had taken from Greeks the most fertile areas of Mornos plains as it is evidenced by the township names of Omer Efendi (Kastraki), Hasan–Aga (Agios Polykarpos), Sule (short for Suleiman) today’s Efpalio.

According to the 1827 writings Trip around Greece by the French counselor to Ioannina Pouqueville, in the early 1800s there were 25 families living in Omar Effendi. Omar Effendi was part of the vilaeti (administration) of Lidoriki. The vilaeti of Lidoriki was under the Pasha of Nafpaktos for some time and also under the authority of the Albanian Ali Pasha (1750-1821) of Ioannina from Tepeleni, known as "Ali the Tepelenis".

Omar Effendi was the battle site several times over the 1821 Greek struggle for independence. The village's location at the east side of the Mornos River on the road of Nafpaktos to Amfissa placed it in a strategic position and a natural place to resist advancing troops between Aitolia and Phokis in either direction. In June 1822 a division of Omar Vryoni moved from Nafpaktos with destination Salona. A couple of kilometers east of Mornos River near Omar Effendi they met the troops of Triantafyllos Apokoritis and were forced to retreat.

At the end of January 1826 near Omar Effendi, 5,000 the Greek forces of Skaltsodemos fought against the Turkish troops causing them many losses, preventing them from advancing east, and forcing them back to Nafpaktos. In December 1826 about 1500 Turks and Albanians rushed to Amfissa to assist in breaking the siege of Turkish troops in Amfissa by Greek freedom fighters never made it there. About 2 km east of Mornos River near Omar Effendi, they were surprised by the cavalry of Hatzimichales (under Karaiskakis's leadership although he was not there) killing 53, capturing 22, and turning the troops back to Nafpaktos.

The new and current name of the village Kastraki (little castle) was given in 1927 when many Turkish-given names to villages and towns were changed into Greek ones. The name Kastraki was justified by the remnants of a Locric ancient castle at the borders of Locris and Aetolia about 3 km southwest of the village Trikorfo.
