= Protergia =

Greek utility service company

- Type: Privately held company
- Predecessor: Endesa Hellas
- Founded: 2014
- Headquarters: Athens, Greece
- Services: Power supply Natural gas supply
- Owner: Metlen Energy & Metals (100%)
- Website: https://www.protergia.gr/

Protergia is the biggest private company for the production and supply of electricity and natural gas in Greece. It is a subsidiary and is 100% owned by the Metlen Energy & Metals.

Protergia is Metlen Energy & Metals Electricity and Natural Gas provider, the largest private energy company in Greece, and is active in the supply of electricity and gas by offering modern and reliable services. Protergia offers combined electricity and gas products and serves more than 550.000 electricity supply account numbers throughout the country.

== History ==
In July 2010, the Mytilineos Group agreed with Enel to acquire 50.01% of Endesa Hellas, which then belonged to Endesa SA. The Mytilineos Group thus becomes the sole shareholder of Endesa Hellas which will soon be called Protergia. Until the end of 2013, Protergia was exclusively an energy producer, while in January 2014 it started to be active in the supply of electricity and in January 2018 in the supply of natural gas.
