= Mesochora =

Mesochora Μεσοχώρα
- Community
- Location within Greece
- Coordinates: 39°28′N 21°20′E
- Country: Greece
- Administrative region: Thessaly
- Regional unit: Trikala
- Municipality: Pyli
- Municipal unit: Pindos

Population (2021)
  - Community: 179
- Time zone: UTC+2 (EET)
  - Summer (DST): UTC+3 (EEST)
- Vehicle registration: ΤΚ

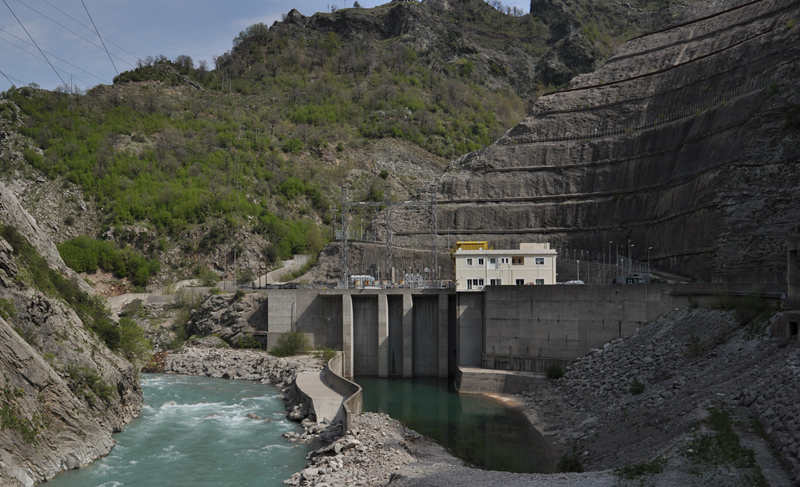
Mesochora Hydropower Plant at Acheloos river.

Mesochora (Greek: Μεσοχώρα, before 1928: Βιτσίστα - Vitsista) is a mountain village in the municipal unit of Pindos in the southwestern part of the Trikala regional unit, Greece. It is located in the Athamanika mountains (southern Pindus), on the upper course of the river Acheloos, about 800 m above sea level. It is situated 40 km west of the city of Trikala. It is located by the Greek National Road 30 (Trikala - Arta). In 2021 Mesochora had a population of 179 for the community, including the small villages Exochi and Spitia. It became a part of the municipality of Pindos in 1997 under the Capodistrian Plan.

== Population ==
Year	Settlement population	Community population
1981	264	-
1991	459	-
2001	415	470
2011	141	143
2021	157	179

== See also ==
- List of settlements in the Trikala regional unit
