= Solar power in Greece =

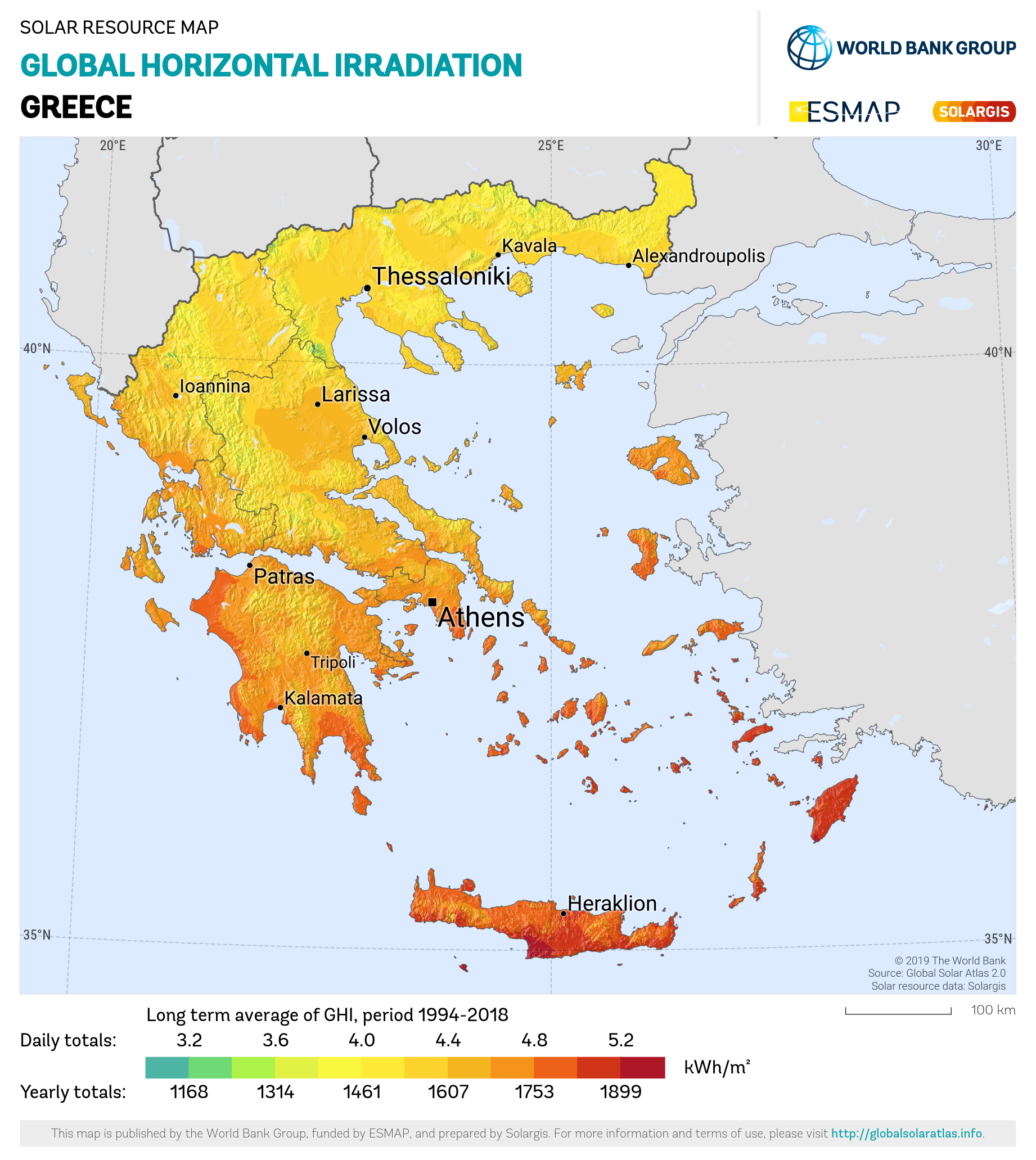
- Irradiation map of Greece
- Installed capacity: 9.27 GW (2024) (21st)
- Annual generation: 12.27 TWh (2024)
- Capacity per capita: 886 W (2024)
- Share of electricity: 21.4% (2024)

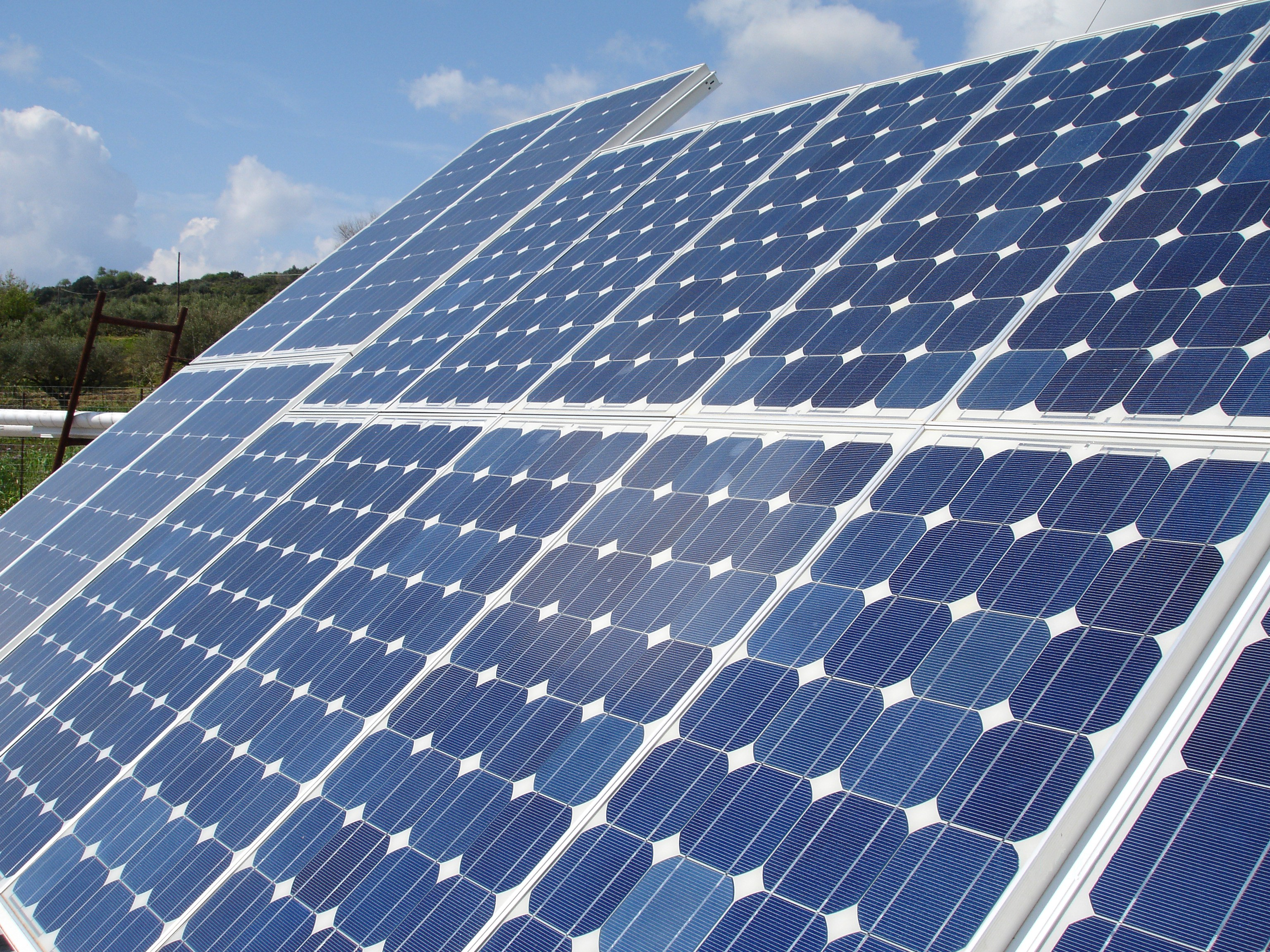
Polycrystalline solar panels in Lixouri

Solar power in Greece has been driven by a combination of government incentives and equipment cost reductions. The installation boom started in the late 2000s with feed-in tariffs has evolved into a market featuring auctions, power purchase agreements, and self-generation. The country's relatively high level of solar insolation is an advantage boosting the effectiveness of solar panels; within Europe, Greece receives 50% more solar irradiation than Germany.

In 2022, solar power accounted for 12.6% of total electricity generation in Greece, up from 0.3% in 2010 and less than 0.1% in 2000. The national government's 2023 National Energy & Climate Plan anticipates solar PV capacity rising from 4.8 GW in 2022 to 14.1 GW in 2030, and 34.5 GW in 2050.

At the end of 2024, the installed capacity was at 9.6 GW, double the capacity compared to two years before.

== History ==
Photovoltaics installed capacity and production in Greece

Broad development of solar power in Greece started in the 2000s, with installations of photovoltaic systems skyrocketing from 2009 because of the appealing feed-in tariffs introduced and the corresponding regulations for domestic applications of rooftop solar PV. However, funding the FITs created an unacceptable deficit of more than €500 million in the Greek "Operator of Electricity Market" RES fund. To reduce that deficit, new regulations were introduced in August 2012 including retrospective feed-in tariffs reduction, with further reductions over time. These measures enabled the deficit to be erased by 2017.

Auctions have replaced FITs and after stagnating since 2013, as of 2019 Greece was again installing hundreds of MWp per year.

By April 2015, the total installed photovoltaic capacity in Greece had reached 2,442.6 MW_{p} from which 350.5 MW_{p} were installed on rooftops and the rest were ground mounted. Greece ranks 5th worldwide with regard to per capita installed PV capacity. In 2026 battery storage was integrated into the grid to cope with solar variations.

== Future developments ==
Most future developments are expected to be utility scale.

== Installed capacity ==
Greek solar power development
Year	Capacity (MW)	Watts per capita	Electricity generation %
2010	205	18	0.3%
2020	3,287	304	9.2%
2023	6,453	620	19.0%

== List of power stations ==
=== Current ===
Greece's largest photovoltaic (PV) power plants
Location	Capacity	Description	Constructed
Kozani	204 MW	Park of Kozani	2022
Naoussa	7+7 MW	Photovoltaic plants cluster	2013
Florina	4.3 MW	Florina industrial zone	2009
Volos	2 MW	Photovoltaic power plant Volos	2009
Thebes	2 MW	Photovoltaic power plant Thebes	2009
Koutsopodi	1.997 MW		2009
Tripoli	1.99 MW		2009
Pournari	1.25 MW		2009
Iliopenditiki	1 MW		2009
Pontoiraklia	944 kW		2009
Kythnos	100 kW		2009
Sifnos	60 kW		1998
Tavros, ILPAP Building	20 kW		2009
Ethel Station	20 kW		2009
Maroussi, Eirini metro station	20 kW		2009

=== Future ===
Greece's largest photovoltaic (PV) power plants
Location	Capacity	Description	Constructed
Ptolemaida	550MW	Lignite Centre of Western Macedonia	To commence operation in 2025
Amyntaio	450MW	Western Macedonia	To commence operation in 2025
Thessaly	390MW	Park of Argyromylos	-
Megalopoli	50 MW	Park of Megalopoli	-
Crete	0.48 MW	Park of Atherinolakos	-

== See also ==
- Renewable energy in Greece
- Desertec
- Solar power
- Solar power in the European Union
- Solar power by country
- Renewable energy by country
