= Stratos, Greece =

Village in Acarnania, Greece

Stratos Στράτος
- Municipal unit
- Location within the regional unit

- Location within Greece
- Coordinates: 38°40′N 21°19′E
- Country: Greece
- Administrative region: West Greece
- Regional unit: Aetolia-Acarnania
- Municipality: Agrinio

Area
  - Municipal unit: 153.307 km^{2} (59.192 sq mi)
  - Community: 30.313 km^{2} (11.704 sq mi)
- Elevation: 50 m (160 ft)

Population (2021)
  - Municipal unit: 4,369
  - Municipal unit density: 28.50/km^{2} (73.81/sq mi)
  - Community: 860
  - Community density: 28/km^{2} (73/sq mi)
- Time zone: UTC+2 (EET)
  - Summer (DST): UTC+3 (EEST)
- Postal code: 301 00
- Area code: +30-2641
- Vehicle registration: AI

Stratos (Greek: Στράτος, Latin: Stratus, Aromanian: Sorovigli) is a settlement in central Aetolia-Acarnania, Western Greece. It is best known for its remains of the namesake ancient Greek city and capital of Acarnania, which lie on a hillside about 500 m (1,600 ft) north of the modern village.

Stratos is situated on the right bank of the river Acheloos, 9 km (5.6 mi) northwest of the town of Agrinio. The area north of Stratos is mountainous, whereas the south is flat. It is now an Aromanian village and a municipal unit of the Agrinio municipality.

== History ==
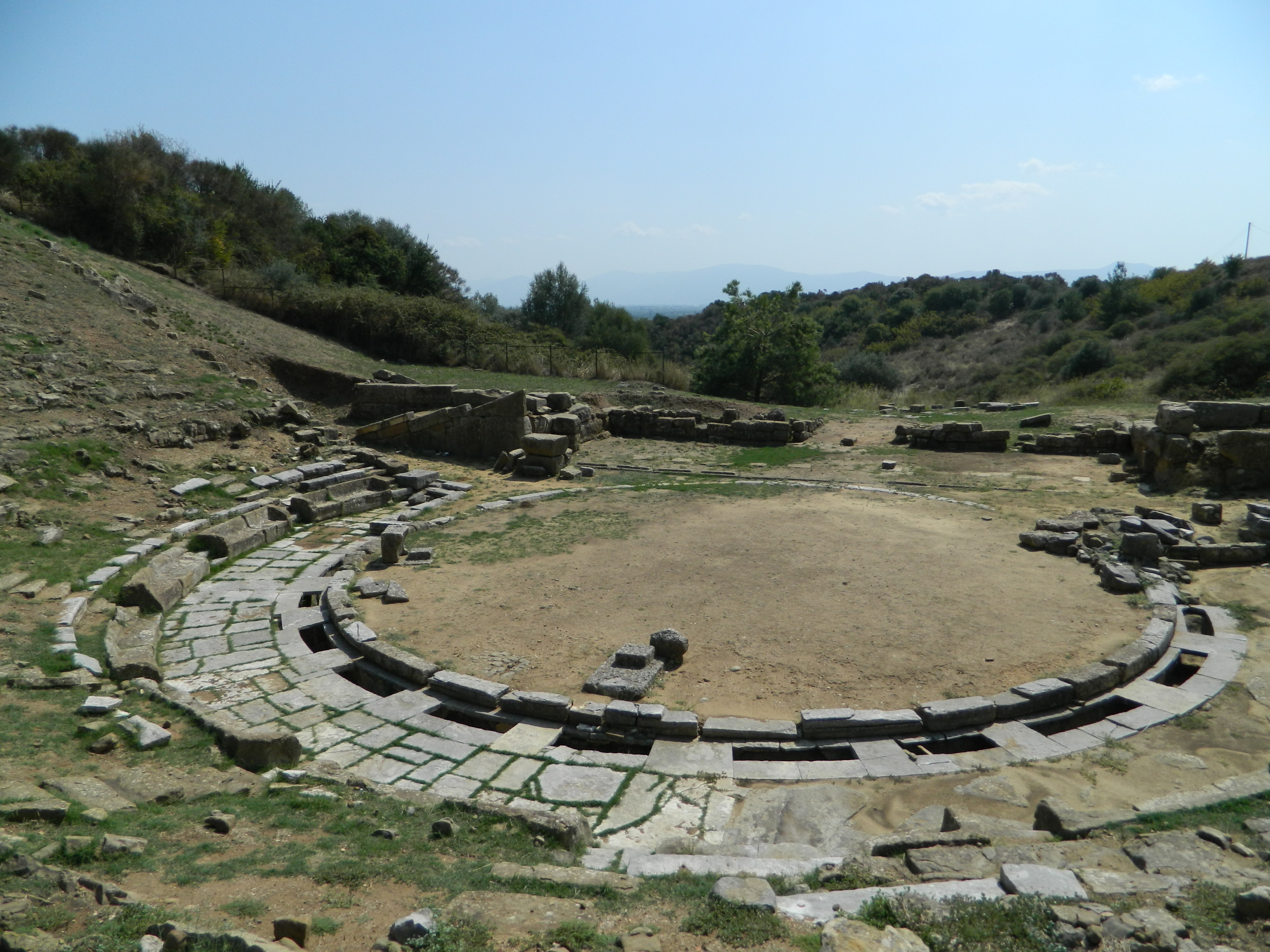
Remains of the ancient theatre

Its situation at the northern edge of the fertile Achelous River plain and on the strategic maritime route to Italy as well as the navigability of the river up to city made it a place of great military importance and Stratos emerged as the largest and best fortified city of Acarnania. It was where judicial proceedings common to all the Arcananians took place, and by Thucydides' time Stratos was the capital of Acarnania and the federal assemblies were held there. As a result, it prospered greatly in the 5th century BC.

As capital of Acarnanian League, Stratos was involved in many wars. In the 5th century BC, the Corinthians were forced out of their Acarnanian settlements by Athens. In 429 BC in the Pelopponesian War, the Pelopponesians under the Spartan Knemos attacked Stratos and were defeated "with great slaughter". In about 390 BC the cities of Acarnania surrendered to the Spartans under King Agesilaus, and continued to be Spartan allies until joining the Second Athenian Empire in 375 BC. The Acarnanians later sided with the Boeotians in their fight against Sparta, and with Athens against Philip II of Macedon at Chaeronea.

In 314 BC, King Cassander of Macedon took the city to use as a military base against the Aetolians. After 252 BC however, Stratos fell to the Aetolians. During the march of Philip V on Thermos in the Social War in 218 BC, he marched along the Achelous and on to Stratos where he unsuccessfully challenged the citizens to fight.

In 169 BC, Stratos invited the Romans into Greece as allies against Perseus of Macedon. With the founding of Nicopolis in 28BC, much of the population was obliged to move to the new city and Stratos fell into decline.

== Monuments ==
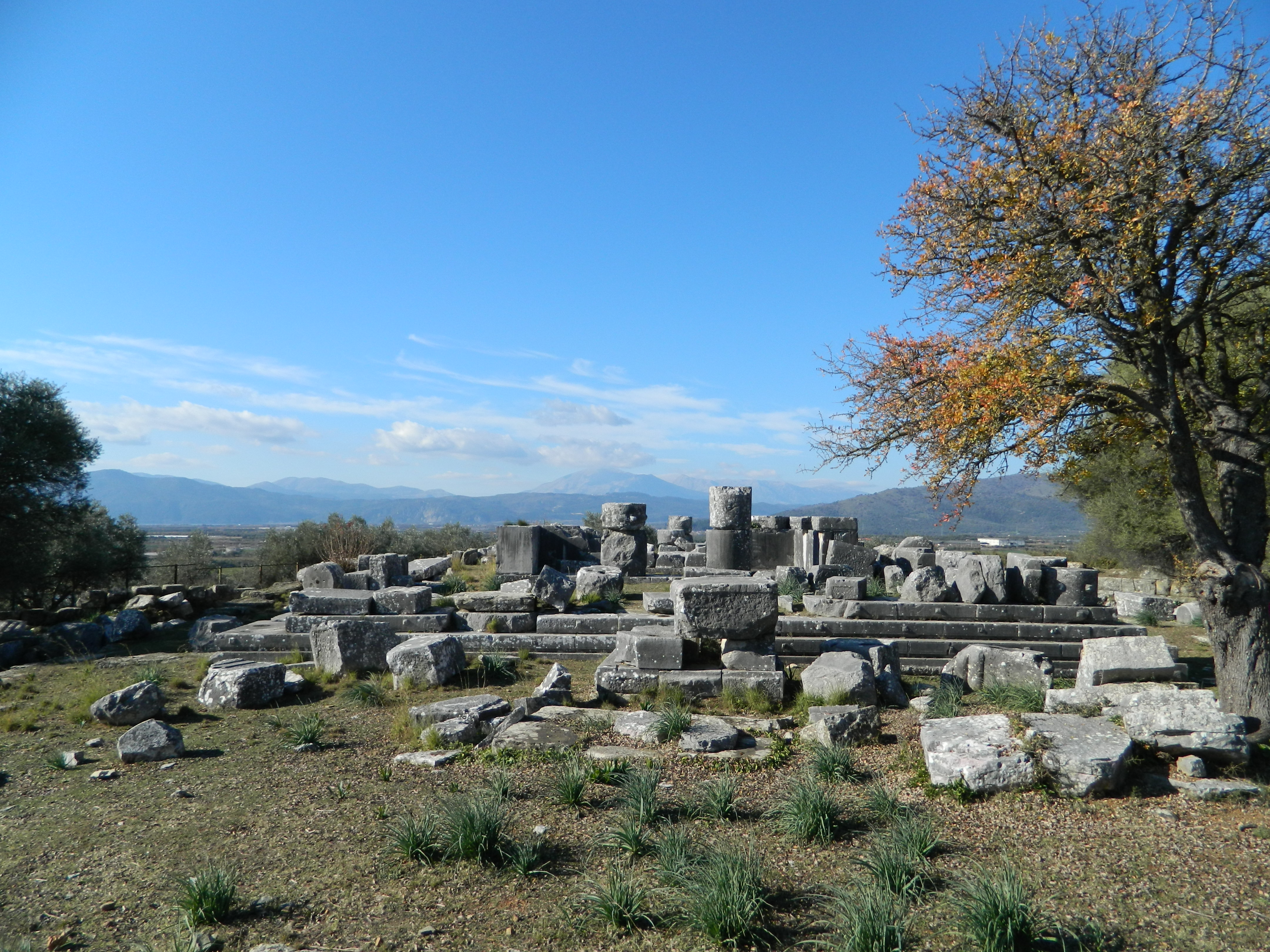
The Temple of Zeus

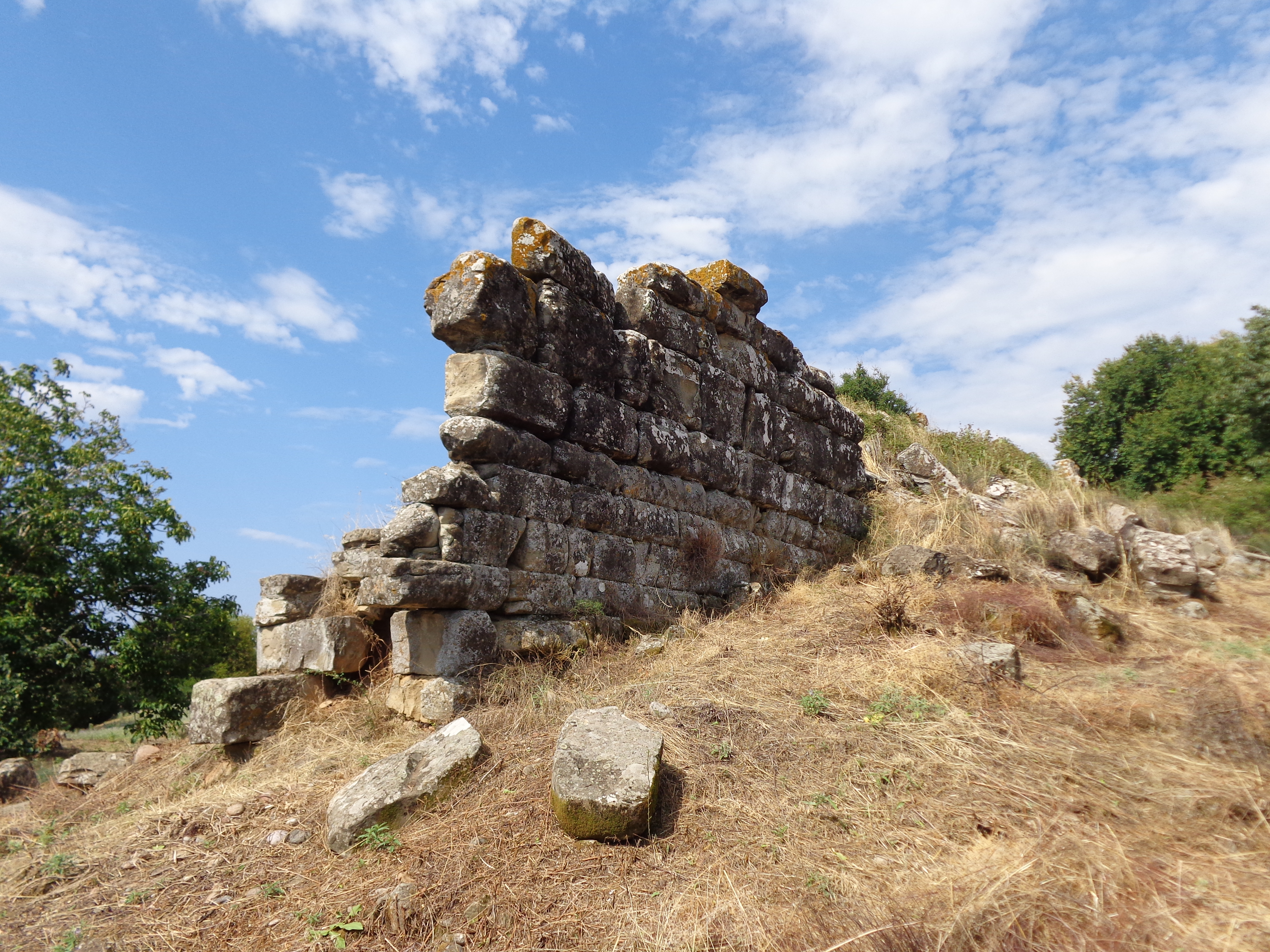
Remains of the city wall

The main excavations are of the Agora and Stoa, the Temple of Zeus, the theatre, and the city walls.

=== Temple of Zeus ===
The temple stands on the top of a fortified hill at the remote northwest end of the city. It is one of the most important Early Hellenistic buildings in mainland Greece. It was of the Doric order, with Corinthian columns in the cella. In addition to this combination of architectural orders, the monument shows several more structural and planning innovations. Construction of the temple began in 321 BC but was never finished, probably due to fights against the Aetolians. For example, the fluting of the columns was never completed and the column drums retain their bosses (used for maneuvering the heavy blocks during the critical lifting phase). The remains of the temple show the exquisite detail of sculpture in its construction, and also the excellent state of preservation of the base and many constituent blocks despite almost 2500 years of weathering.

=== Walls ===
The area enclosed by the city walls of 7.5 km length includes four long hills and three valley areas. They are constructed of massive blocks and include towers at intervals.

== Modern village ==
Before 1928 the village was named Sorovigli (Greek: Σωροβίγλι). Before the 2011 local government reform Stratos was an independent municipality. The municipal unit has an area of 153.307 km^{2} (59.192 sq mi), the community 30.313 km^{2} (11.704 sq mi). The municipal unit had a population of 4,369 in 2021, the community 860.

== See also ==
- List of ancient Greek cities
