= Energy in Greece =

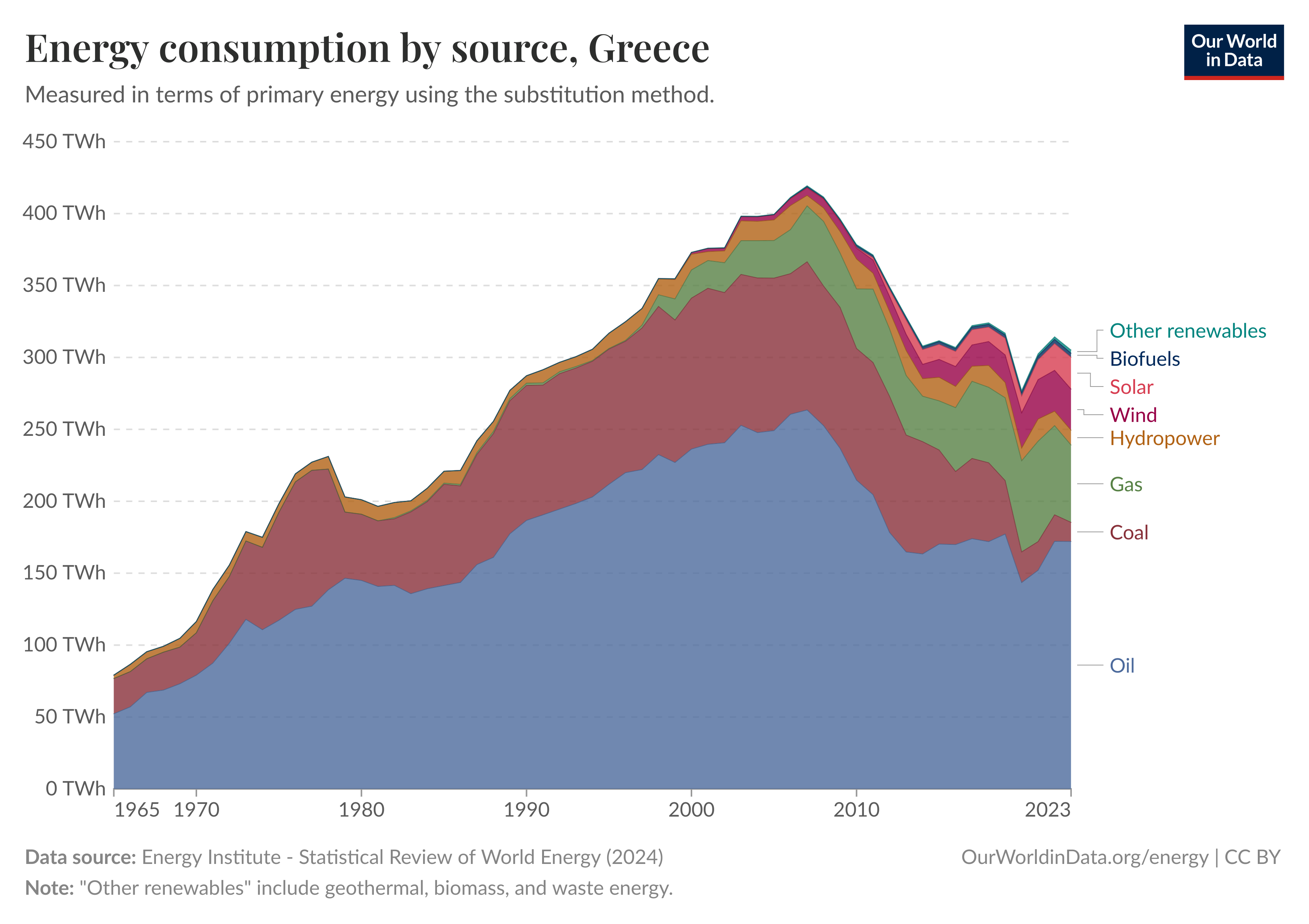
Energy consumption by source by year in Greece

Development of carbon dioxide emissions

Energy in Greece is dominated by fossil gas and oil. Electricity generation is dominated by the one-third state owned Public Power Corporation (DEI). In 2009 DEI supplied 85.6% of all electric energy demand in Greece, while the number fell to 77.3% in 2010. Almost half of DEI's power output in 2010 was generated using lignite. 12% of Greece's electricity comes from hydroelectric power plants and another 20% from natural gas. Between 2009 and 2010, independent companies' energy production increased by 56%, from 2,709 Gigawatt hour in 2009 to 4,232 GWh in 2010.

Since 2015, Greece has significantly expanded renewable energy, with renewables and hydropower rising from over 20% of electricity generation to around 50%. At the same time, reliance on lignite fell sharply from 60% in 2005 to about 10% in 2021. By this Greece is supporting its long term climate goals. Building on this progress, Greece now targets at least a 55% emissions reduction by 2030 and carbon neutrality by 2050.

These policies are complemented by structural market reforms: the electricity market is fully liberalized with minimal entry barriers, and the regulatory framework now includes prioritized grid access for RES projects, “net‑billing” mechanisms, and support schemes for energy storage systems such as battery integration. Solar becomes increasingly competitive, with costs projected to halve by 2040. Baseload and offshore wind remain the most expensive sources on average and more stable over time. Onshore wind offers a balanced profile, with moderately lower costs than baseload and offshore wind.

== Tables & market share of companies ==
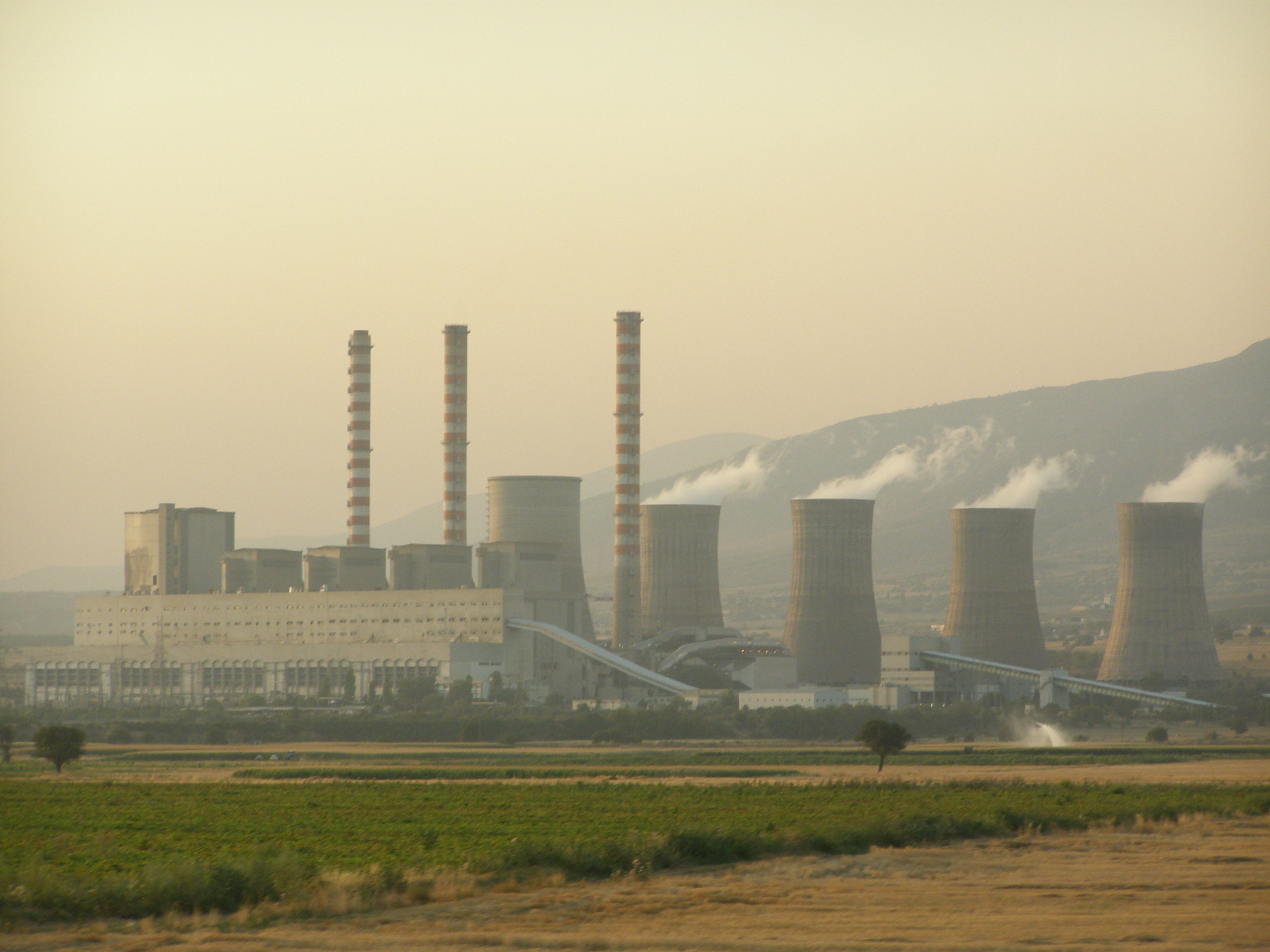
Agios Dimitrios Power Plant

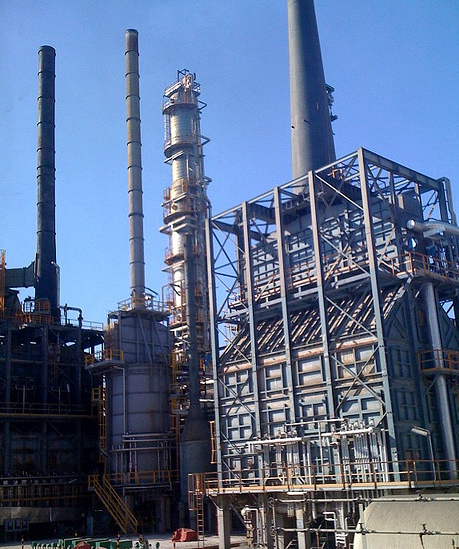
A refinery owned by Hellenic Petroleum

2021 Market share of each company offering electricity to households and businesses
Company	Market percentage	Subscribers
PPC/ΔΕΗ	75.1%	5,100,000
Protergia	3.94%	267,000
Elpedison	3.67%	249,000
ΗΡΩΝ/IRON	3.32%	225,000
Watt+Volt	2.50%	169,000
ZeniΘ	2.48%	168,000
NRG	1.99%	135,000
Volton	1.75%	118,000
Φυσικό αέριο Αττικής/Gas of Attica	1.50%	101,000
Volterra	0,57%	38,000

== Fossil fuel ==
=== Oil and gas ===
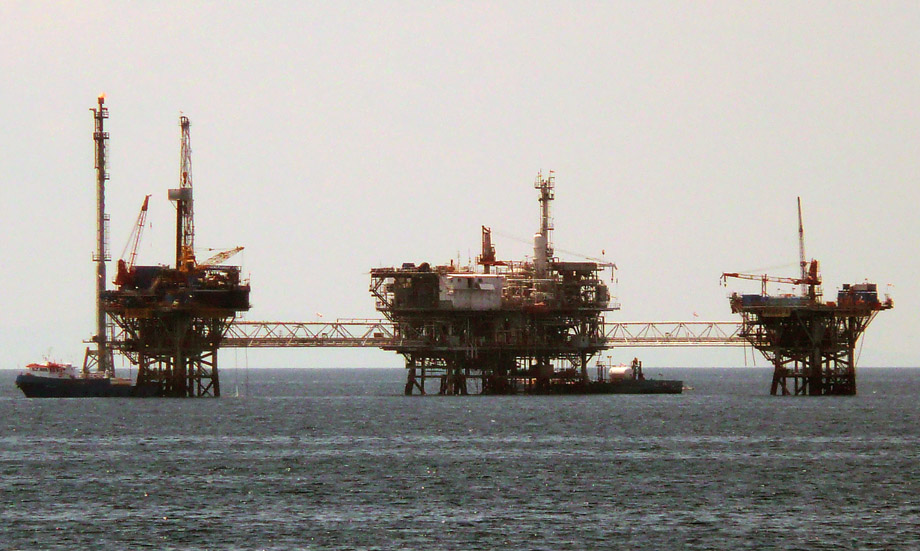
Oil rig near Kavala

Greece has 10 million barrels of proved oil reserves as of 1 January 2011. Hellenic Petroleum is the country's largest oil company, followed by Motor Oil Hellas. Greece's oil production stands at 7,946 barrels per day (bbl/d), ranked 90th, while it exports 1,863 bbl/d (57th) and imports 496,600 bbl/d (25th).

In 2011 the Greek government approved the start of oil exploration and drilling in three locations within Greece, with an estimated output of 250 to 300 million barrels over the next 15 to 20 years. The estimated output in Euros of the three deposits is €25 billion over a 15-year period, of which €13–€14 billion will enter state coffers. Greece's dispute with Turkey over the Aegean poses substantial obstacles to oil exploration in the Aegean Sea.

In addition to the above, Greece is also to start oil and gas exploration in other locations in the Ionian Sea as well as the Libyan Sea, within the Greek exclusive economic zone, south of Crete. The Ministry of the Environment, Energy and Climate Change announced that there was interest from various countries (including Norway and the United States) in exploration, and the first results regarding the amount of oil and gas in these locations are expected in the summer of 2012.

Gas pipelines include the Gas Interconnector Greece–Bulgaria and the Turkey–Greece pipeline which is a 296 kilometres (184 mi) long natural gas pipeline, which connects Turkish and Greek gas grids completed in 2007.

On 15 April 2026, it was reported that for the first time in 40 years Greece will conduct an exploratory drilling. The contract signed between ExxonMobil, Energean, and HELLENiQ Energy, and Greece’s Ministry of Environment and Energy, for drilling in Block 2 in the north-western Ionian Sea.

=== Coal ===
Megalopoli Mine is a large lignite and coal mine owned by the Public Power Corporation of Greece. The largest lignite and coal mine in Greece are in the area of Western Macedonia and especially in Ptolemaida. Greece plans to shut down the last coal fired power plant in the country by 2026.

== Renewable energy ==
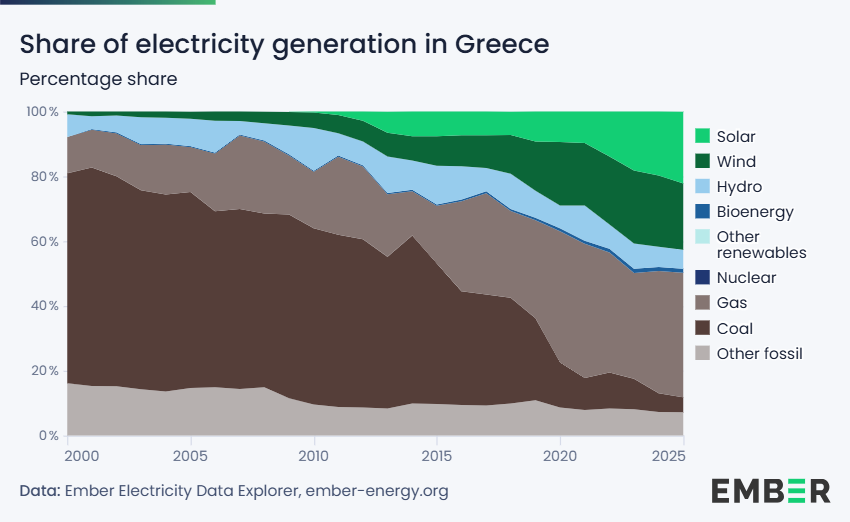
Electricity generation in Greece - percentage share

Renewable energy in Greece accounted for 29 percent of its electricity from renewable sources in 2021. By 2030, renewables are expected to have a capacity of 28 GW, and exceed 61 percent of Greece's electricity consumption. This is a significant increase from 8% of the country's total energy consumption in 2008. By 2022, Greece occasionally reached 100% renewables for a few hours. The target for 2050 is a capacity of 65 GW.

=== Biomass ===
==== Regulation Background ====
EU Renewable Energy Directive 2009/28/EC requires the EU to fulfill at least 20% of its total energy needs with renewable by 2020. This should be achieved through the attainment of individual national targets. EU Commission allocates biomass as the third source of energy within EU after wind. Greek State allocated 350 MW of electricity to biomass - bio-fuels

==== Greek Situation Analysis ====
- Currently <50 MW of biomass - bio-fuels to energy are operating in Greece (Out of 350 MW).
- Feed in tariff (FIT) is 198 €/MW h.
- 20-year contract with an extension option at the end.
- There is a quite long licensing process.

=== Wind ===
Greece's wind energy capacity in MW per year. x-axis is the year and y-axis is the capacity in Megawatt.

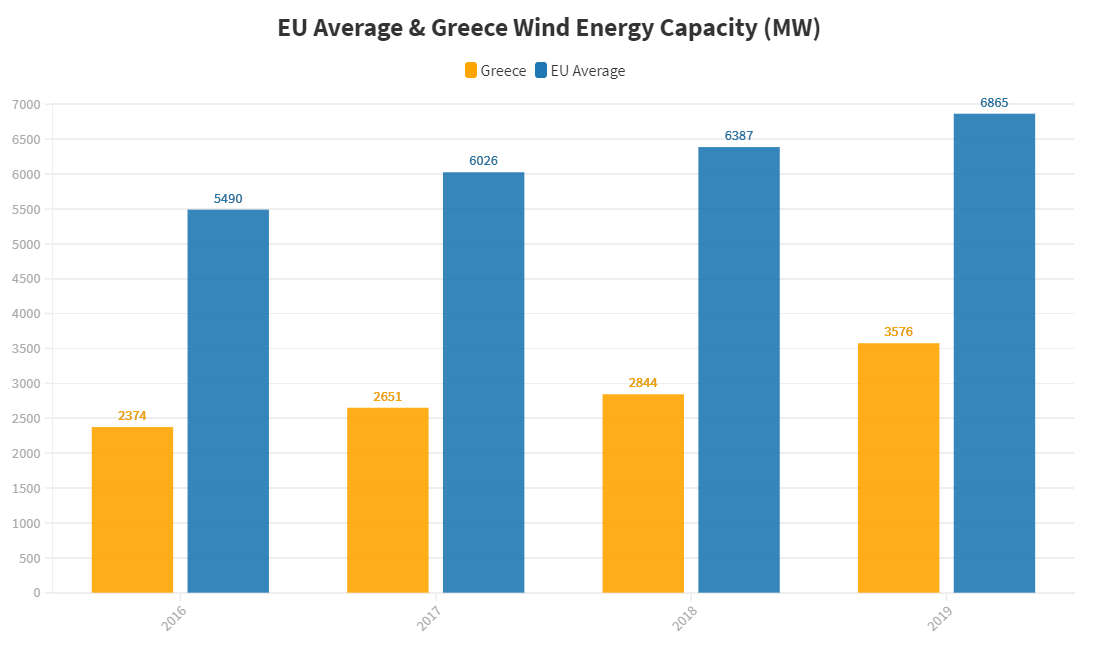
Comparison: EU Average and Greece Wind Energy Capacity (MW)

EU and Greece Wind Energy Capacity (MW)
Country	2019	2018	2017	2016	2015	2014	2013	2012	2011	2010	2008	2006	2004	2002	2000	1998
EU	192,231	178,826	168,729	153,730	141,726	129,060	117,383	105,696	93,957	84,074	64,712	48,069	34,383	23,159	12,887	6,453
Greece	3,576	2,844	2,651	2,374	2,135	1,980	1,865	1,749	1,629	1,208	985	746	473	297	189	39

=== Solar ===
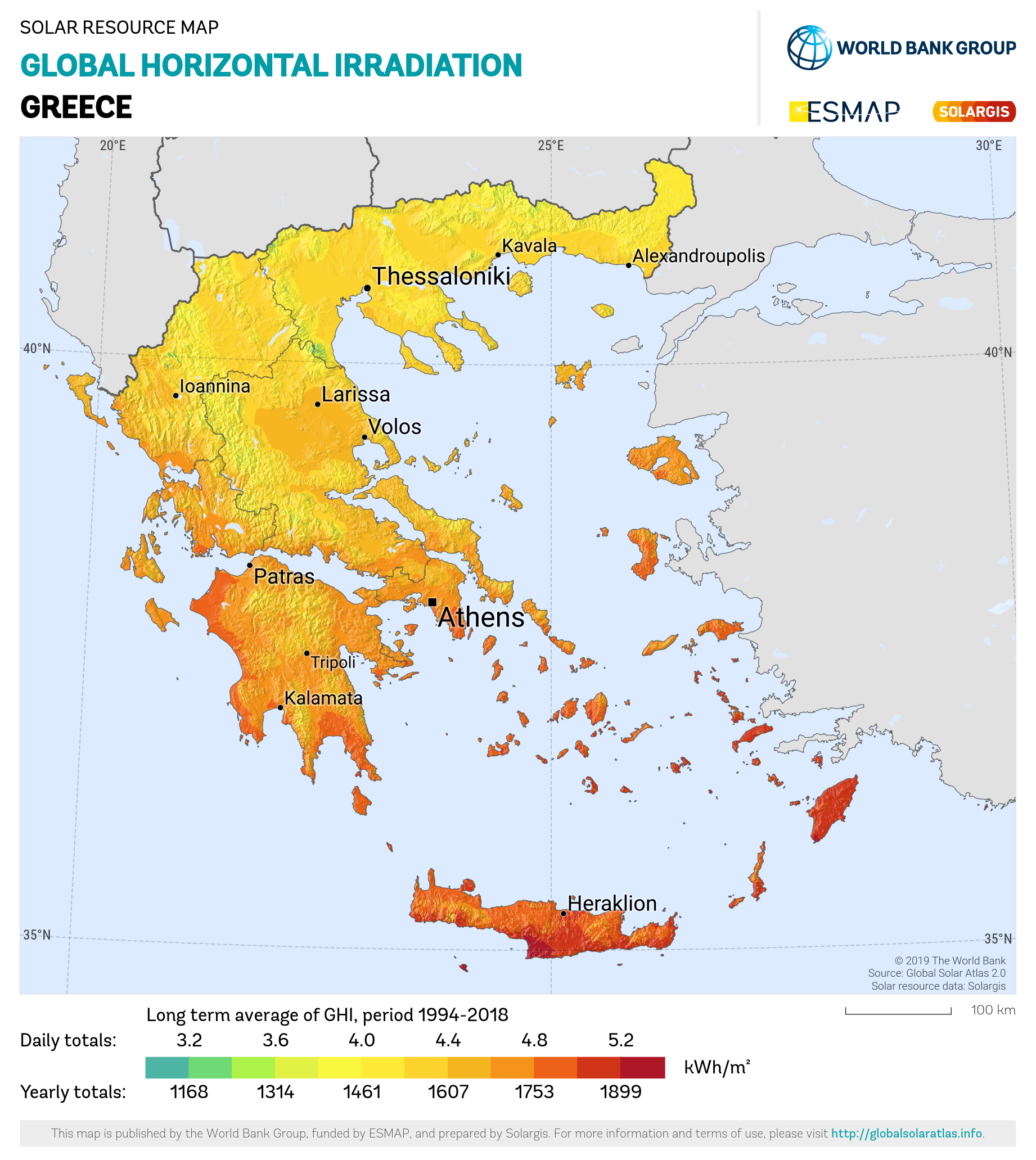
Irradiation map of Greece

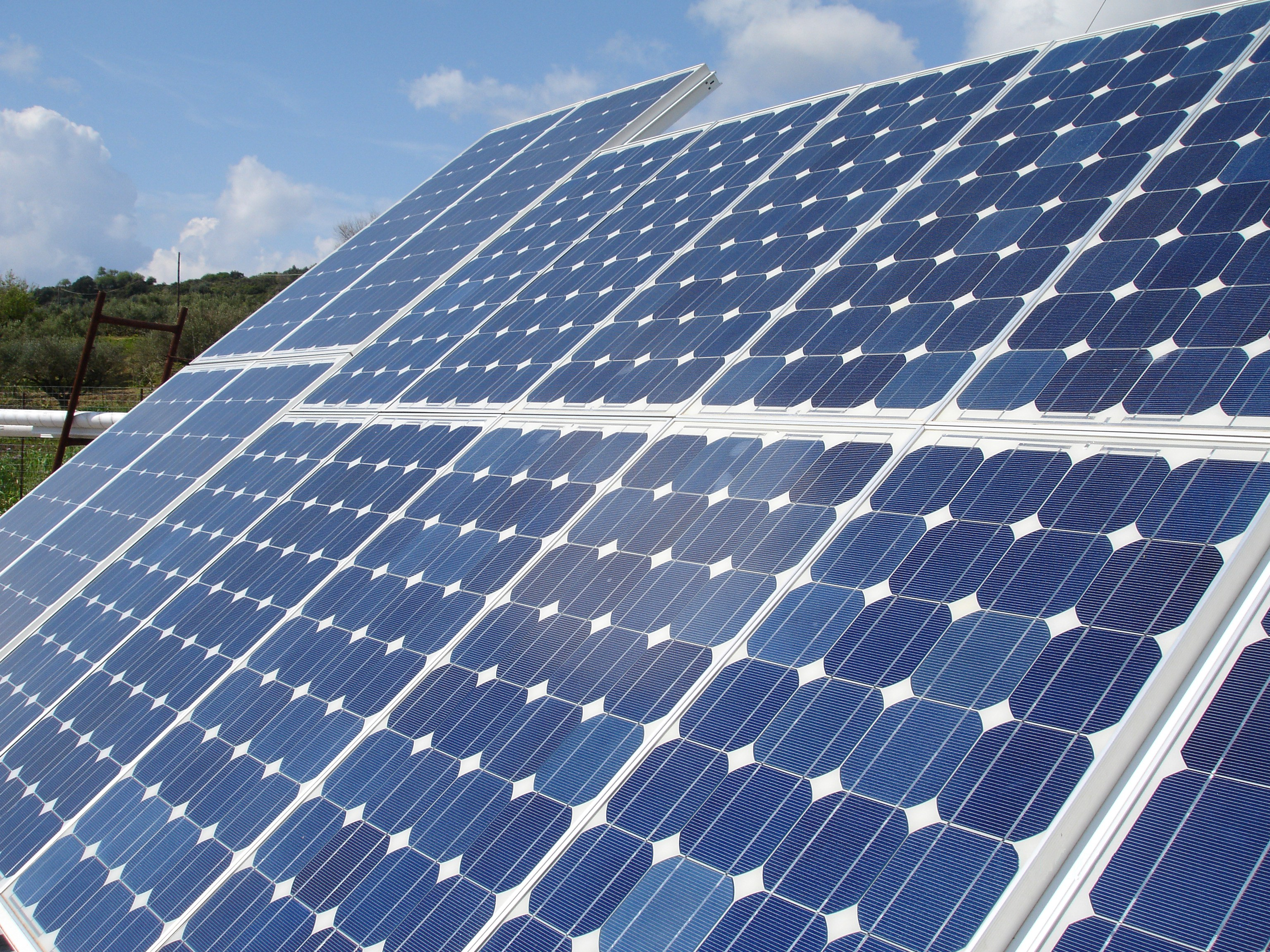
Polycrystalline solar panels in Lixouri

Solar power in Greece has been driven by a combination of government incentives and equipment cost reductions. The installation boom started in the late 2000s with feed-in tariffs has evolved into a market featuring auctions, power purchase agreements, and self-generation. The country's relatively high level of solar insolation is an advantage boosting the effectiveness of solar panels; within Europe, Greece receives 50% more solar irradiation than Germany.

In 2022, solar power accounted for 12.6% of total electricity generation in Greece, up from 0.3% in 2010 and less than 0.1% in 2000. The national government's 2023 National Energy & Climate Plan anticipates solar PV capacity rising from 4.8 GW in 2022 to 14.1 GW in 2030, and 34.5 GW in 2050.

At the end of 2024, the installed capacity was at 9.6 GW, double the capacity compared to two years before.

== Small modular reactors (SMRs) ==
On March 9, 2026, during the 2nd Nuclear Energy Summit in Paris, Kyriakos Mitsotakis announced that Greece will begin exploring the possibility of using nuclear energy, especially Small Modular Reactors (SMRs), as part of its future energy mix. He described this as his country is “turning a page” and studying whether nuclear power could help improve energy security and support the transition to cleaner energy sources.

== See also ==
- Energy in Europe
- Energy policy of the European Union
