= Renewable energy in Greece =

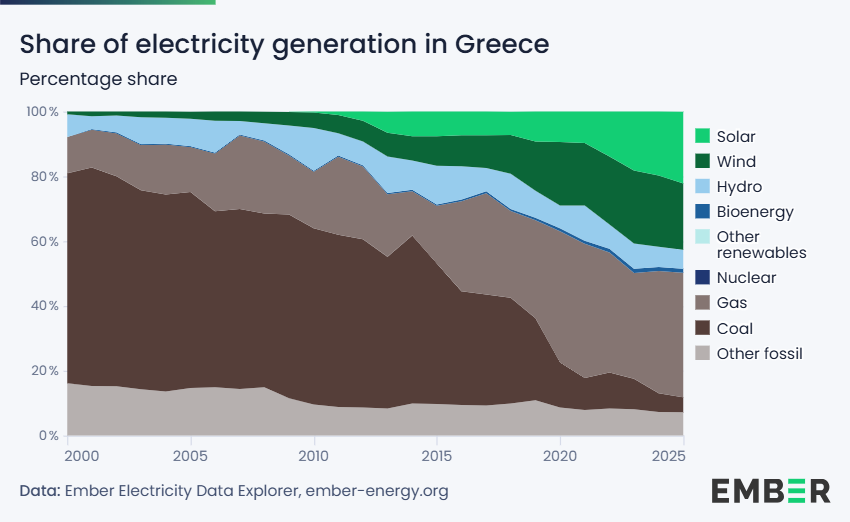
Electricity generation in Greece - percentage share

Renewable energy in Greece accounted for 29 percent of its electricity from renewable sources in 2021. By 2030, renewables are expected to have a capacity of 28 GW, and exceed 61 percent of Greece's electricity consumption. This is a significant increase from 8% of the country's total energy consumption in 2008. By 2022, Greece occasionally reached 100% renewables for a few hours. The target for 2050 is a capacity of 65 GW.

== Regulatory conditions ==
The increase in renewables is in part because of a changing regulatory environment. In August 2016, a new renewable energy law was approved that aims to further stimulate renewable energy investments by introducing feed-in premiums, competitive tenders, and virtual net metering. Under the new law, the compensation for renewable energy producers will consist of what they receive in the electricity market plus a variable feed-in premium. The latter is the difference between a price depending on market variables (e.g., the system’s marginal price) and a set price decided via a competitive tender. Furthermore, from the beginning of 2017, the new scheme to approve new renewable energy capacity is based on competitive tenders, where the Energy Minister is able to call on a tender for specific capacities and technologies.

== Wind power ==
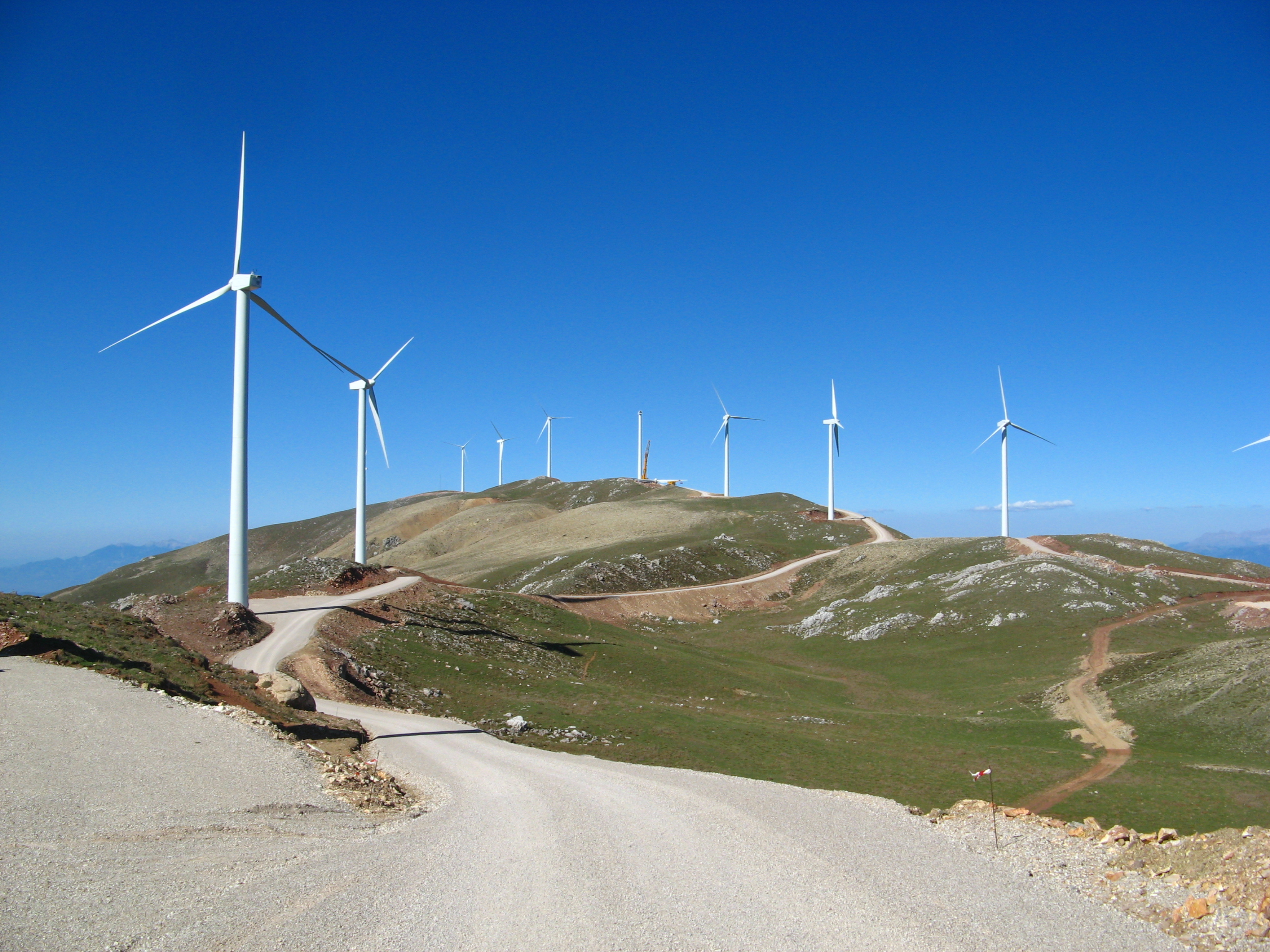
Wind farm on Panachaiko mountain

Greece's wind energy capacity in MW per year. x-axis is the year and y-axis is the capacity in Megawatt.

Wind power installed capacity and generation in Greece

Wind power was due to expand by 352% by 2010 to meet the European target of 20% coverage of energy needs from renewable sources. Previously, there were 1,028 wind turbines installed throughout Greece and the number was set to reach 2,587 wind turbines before the end of 2010.

According to the Ministry of Environment and Public Works, the system would have a nameplate capacity of 3,372 MW of power from wind alone compared to 746 MW at the end of 2006. Greece chose to invest primarily to wind power by 77%, while the rest of renewable sources altogether comprise the remaining 23% of production with hydroelectric power being second with 11%.

The Centre for Renewable Energy Sources and Saving (CRES) is the Greek national entity for the promotion of renewable energy sources, rational use of energy and energy conservation.

=== Timeline ===
year	MW	change	change %
1987	0.8	0.0	0.0%
1988	0.8	0.0	0.0%
1989	1.1	0.3	27.3%
1990	1.5	0.4	26.7%
1991	3.9	2.4	61.5%
1992	19.4	15.5	79.9%
1993	26.0	6.6	25.4%
1994	26.6	0.6	2.3%
1995	27.3	0.7	2.6%
1996	27.3	0.0	0.0%
1997	27.3	0.0	0.0%
1998	38.8	11.5	29.6%
1999	107.0	68.2	63.7%

year	MW	change	change %
2000	237	130	54.9%
2001	277	40	14.4%
2002	293	16	5.5%
2003	409	116	28.4%
2004	481	72	15.0%
2005	603	122	20.2%
2006	750	147	19.6%
2007	850	100	11.8%
2008	997	147	14.7%
2009	1,155	158	13.7%
2010	1,324	169	12.8%
2011	1,637	313	19.1%
2012	1,751	114	6.5%

year	MW	change	change %
2013	1,866	115	6.2%
2014	1,978	112	5.7%
2015	2,136	158	7.4%
2016	2,371	235	9.9%
2017	2,652	281	10.6%
2018	2,828	176	6.2%
2019	3,576	748	26.4%
2020	4,113	537	15.0%
2021	4,451	338	8.2%
2023	5,230	779	17.5%
2024	5,355	125	2.4%

Source: Hellenic Wind Energy Association, Statista

== Solar power ==
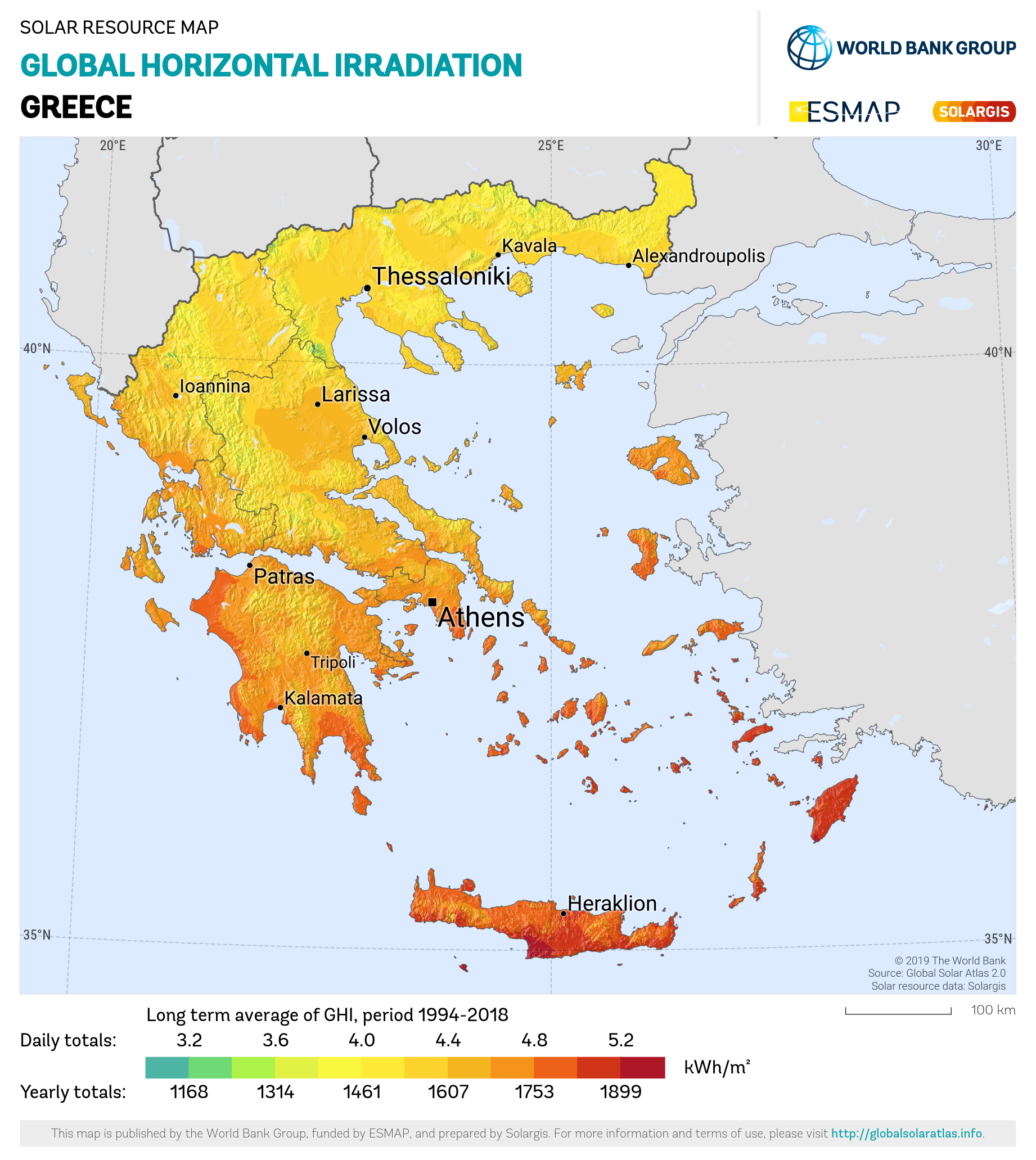
Irradiation map of Greece

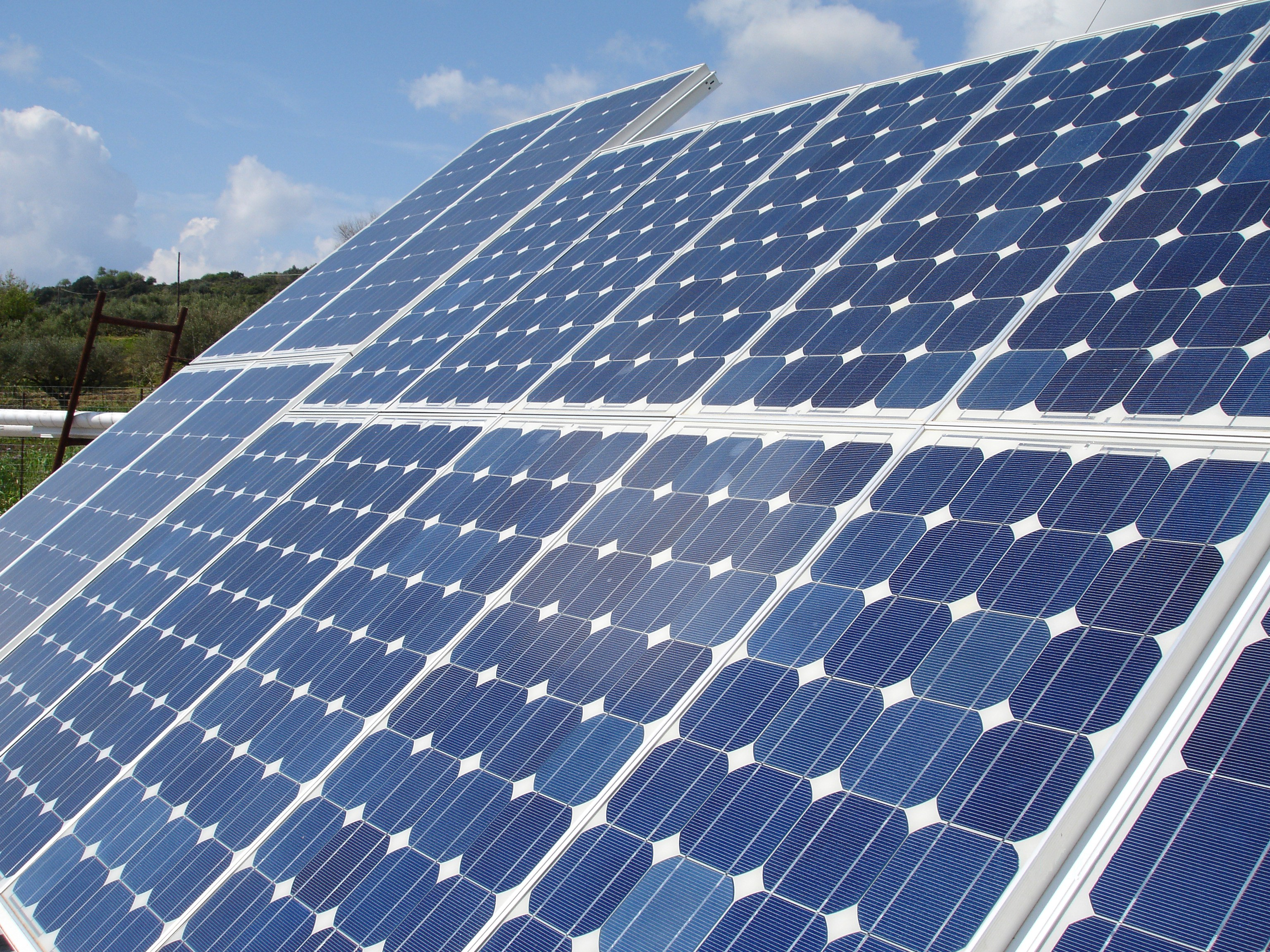
Polycrystalline solar panels in Lixouri

Solar power in Greece has been driven by a combination of government incentives and equipment cost reductions. The installation boom started in the late 2000s with feed-in tariffs has evolved into a market featuring auctions, power purchase agreements, and self-generation. The country's relatively high level of solar insolation is an advantage boosting the effectiveness of solar panels; within Europe, Greece receives 50% more solar irradiation than Germany.

In 2022, solar power accounted for 12.6% of total electricity generation in Greece, up from 0.3% in 2010 and less than 0.1% in 2000. The national government's 2023 National Energy & Climate Plan anticipates solar PV capacity rising from 4.8 GW in 2022 to 14.1 GW in 2030, and 34.5 GW in 2050.

At the end of 2024, the installed capacity was at 9.6 GW, double the capacity compared to two years before.

== Geothermal energy ==
Due to Greece's geographical positioning in the world, they are advantageous when its comes to harnessing geothermal energy at high or low temperatures. High temperature geothermal energy is classified by being above 90 degrees Celsius, and low temperature geothermal energy is when temperatures are between 25 and 90 degrees Celsius. High temperature geothermal energy can be located 1-2 kilometers beneath Santorini, Nisyros, and the Aegean Islands of Milos, while low temperature geothermal energy can be located in regions such as Loutra-Samothrakis, Serres, Chalkidiki, Alexandroupolis, Lesvos, Chios, and Thermopyles. Geothermal energy in Greece accounts for only 0.5% of the country's renewable energy, and is expected to increase over coming years.

== Biomass and biofuels ==
The amount of biomass that Greece annually produces is estimated to be 2,132,286 tonnes, and this amount comes close to other Mediterranean countries biomass such as Italy and Portugal.

== See also ==
- Economy of Greece
- Energy in Greece
- Solar power in Greece
- Renewable energy by country
