= Administrative divisions of Greece =

Administrative divisions of Greece Διοικητική διαίρεση της Ελλάδας (Greek)
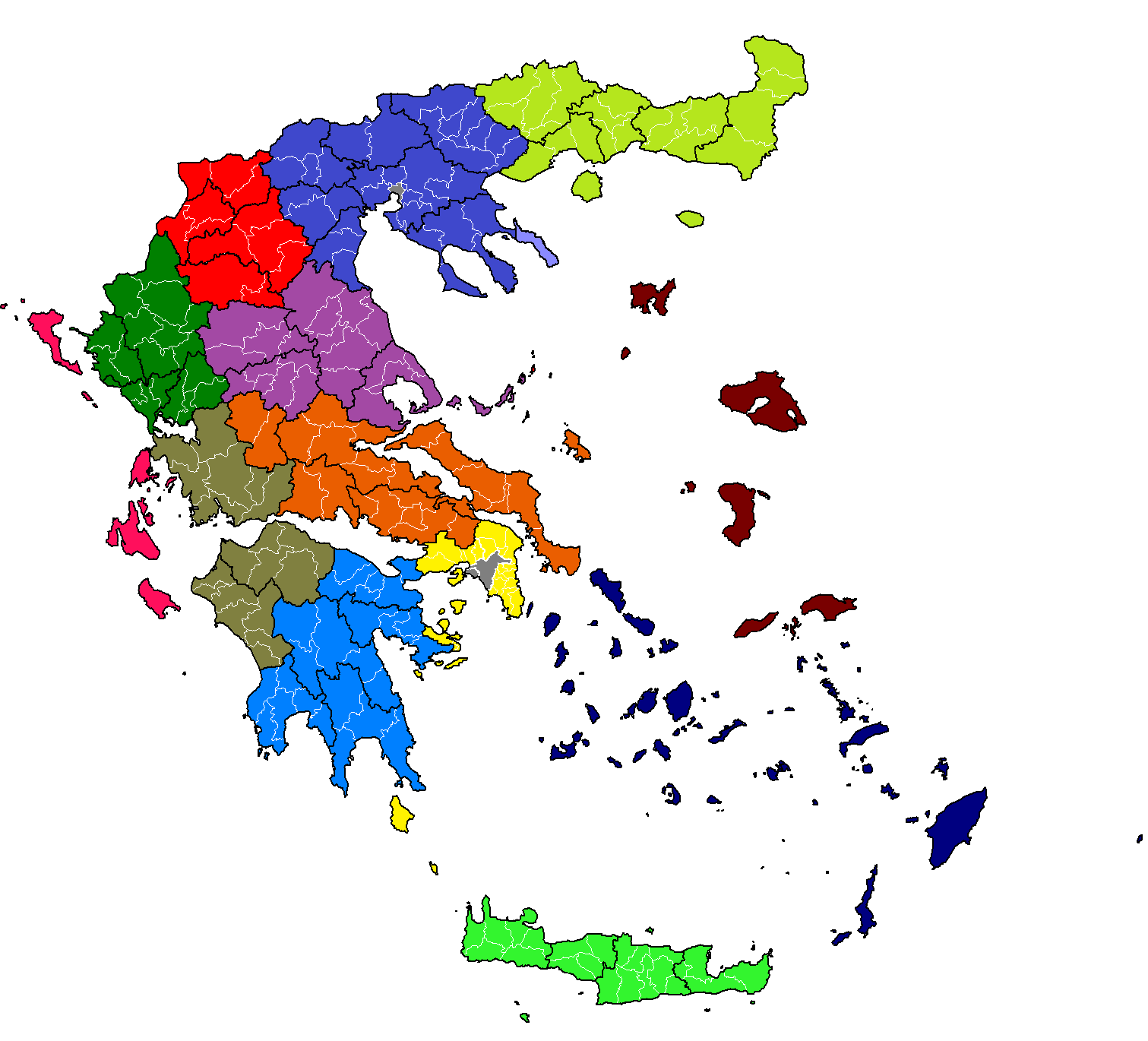
- Category: Unitary state
- Location: Hellenic Republic
- Number: 13 regions, 332 municipalities, 1 autonomous entity (as of 2021)
- Populations: Total: 10,432,481
- Areas: Total: 131,957 km^{2} (50,949 sq mi)

Following the implementation on 1 September 2019 of the Kleisthenis I Programme, the administrative divisions of Greece consist of two main levels: the regions and the municipalities. In addition, a number of decentralized administrations overseeing the regions exist as part of the Ministry of the Interior, but are not part of local government. The old prefectures were either abolished and divided or transformed into regional units in 2011 by Kallikratis Plan. The administrative regions are divided into regional units which are further subdivided into municipalities. The Eastern Orthodox monastic community on Mount Athos is an autonomous self-governing entity.

== Administrative divisions ==
=== Decentralized administrations ===
The first level of administrative division is composed of the new decentralized administrations (αποκεντρωμένες διοικήσεις, apokentroménes dioikíseis), comprising two or three regions (except for Attica and Crete), run by a government-appointed general secretary, assisted by an advisory council drawn from the regional governors and the representatives of the municipalities.

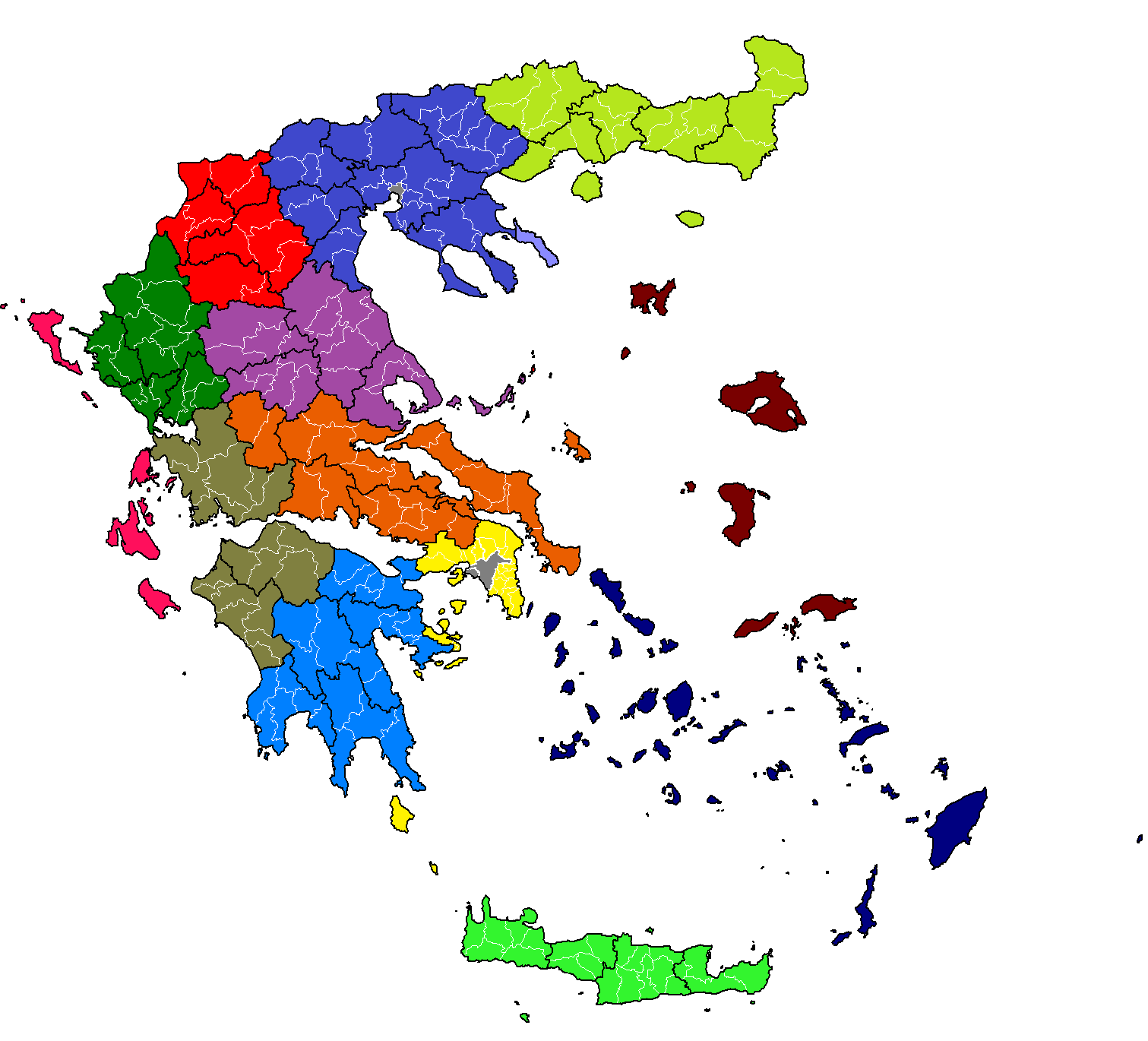
Kallikratis administrative divisions as of 2010

- Decentralized Administration of Attica, with the capital of Athens
- Decentralized Administration of Macedonia and Thrace, with the capital of Thessaloniki
- Decentralized Administration of Epirus and Western Macedonia, with the capital of Ioannina
- Decentralized Administration of Thessaly and Central Greece, with the capital of Larissa
- Decentralized Administration of Peloponnese, Western Greece and the Ionian, with the capital of Patras
- Decentralized Administration of the Aegean, with the capital of Piraeus
- Decentralized Administration of Crete, with the capital of Heraklion
- Mount Athos (self-governing, excluded from the Kallikratis Plan)

=== Regions ===
The second level is composed of the regions (περιφέρειες, periféreies; sing. περιφέρεια, periféreia), run by a regional governor (περιφερειάρχης, perifereiárchis) and a regional council (περιφερειακό συμβούλιο, perifereiakó symvoúlio), popularly elected every 4 years.

The regions are divided into 74 regional units (περιφερειακές ενότητες, perifereiakés enótites), usually but not always coterminous with the former prefectures. Each regional unit is headed by a vice-regional governor (αντιπεριφερειάρχης, antiperifereiárchis), drawn from the same political block as the regional governor.

=== Municipalities ===
The fourth level of government is constituted by the municipalities (δήμοι, dímoi; sing. δήμος, dímos), which have resulted from merging several former municipalities and communities (themselves the subject of a previous reform with the 1997 Kapodistrias plan). They are run by a mayor (δήμαρχος, dímarchos) and a municipal council (δημοτικό συμβούλιο, dimotikó symvoúlio), elected every 4 years. The municipalities are further subdivided into municipal units (δημοτικές ενότητες, dimotikés enótites) and finally into communities (κοινότητες, koinótites). Although communities have their own councils, their role is purely advisory to the municipal-level government.

== History ==
From 1 January 2011, in accordance with the Kallikratis programme, the administrative system of Greece was drastically overhauled. The former system of 13 regions, 54 prefectures and 1033 municipalities and communities was replaced by 7 decentralized administrations, 13 regions and 325 municipalities. From 2019 there are 332 municipalities (Kleisthenis I Programme).

The first elections to the restructured Greek local government areas were held between 29 May and 2 June 2010.

== See also ==
- Politics of Greece
