= List of Greek regions by life expectancy =

Greek regions by life expectancy

The vast majority of European countries achieved best values in life expectancy in 2019, the last year before the COVID-19 pandemic. Greece is rare exception to this pattern - in it, the peak of the average life expectancy occurred in 2018.

According to alternative estimation of the United Nations, in 2023 life expectancy in Greece was 81.86 years (79.29 for male, 84.33 for female).

Estimation of the World Bank Group for 2023: 81.54 years total (79.00 for male, 84.20 for female).

Estimation of Eurostat for 2023: 81.8 years total (79.2 for male, 84.4 for female).

According to estimation of the WHO for 2019, at that year life expectancy in Greece was 80.91 years (78.80 years for male and 83.01 years for female).
And healthy life expectancy was 69.82 years (69.14 years for male and 70.47 years for female).

== Eurostat (2014—2023) ==
The division of Greece into territorial units 2 level (NUTS 2) coincides with the division of Greece into regions. By default the table is sorted by 2023.

code	region	2014				2014 →2019	2019				2019 →2023	2023				2014 →2023
code	region	overall	male	female	F Δ M	2014 →2019	overall	male	female	F Δ M	2019 →2023	overall	male	female	F Δ M	2014 →2023
	Greece on average	81.5	78.8	84.1	5.3	0.2	81.7	79.2	84.2	5.0	0.1	81.8	79.2	84.4	5.2	0.3
EL41	North Aegean	81.9	79.4	84.5	5.1	0.8	82.7	80.3	85.2	4.9	1.1	83.8	81.4	86.2	4.8	1.9
EL54	Epirus	83.5	81.0	86.2	5.2	0.5	84.0	81.7	86.4	4.7	−0.3	83.7	81.0	86.5	5.5	0.2
EL42	South Aegean	81.6	79.2	84.2	5.0	0.7	82.3	80.5	84.3	3.8	0.4	82.7	80.6	84.8	4.2	1.1
EL43	Crete	82.0	79.2	84.9	5.7	0.1	82.1	79.4	84.9	5.5	0.3	82.4	80.2	84.8	4.6	0.4
EL53	Western Macedonia	82.2	79.9	84.7	4.8	0.3	82.5	80.1	85.0	4.9	−0.3	82.2	79.9	84.7	4.8	0.0
EL62	Ionian Islands	81.7	79.3	84.1	4.8	−0.3	81.4	79.6	83.2	3.6	0.4	81.8	79.6	84.1	4.5	0.1
EL64	Central Greece	81.9	79.3	84.6	5.3	−0.1	81.8	79.5	84.2	4.7	0.0	81.8	78.9	84.9	6.0	−0.1
EL63	Western Greece	81.5	78.5	84.7	6.2	0.0	81.5	79.1	83.9	4.8	0.2	81.7	79.2	84.4	5.2	0.2
EL52	Central Macedonia	81.2	78.5	83.9	5.4	0.5	81.7	79.4	84.0	4.6	0.0	81.7	79.2	84.2	5.0	0.5
EL30	Attica	81.1	78.3	83.8	5.5	0.1	81.2	78.4	83.8	5.4	0.5	81.7	79.0	84.2	5.2	0.6
EL65	Peloponnese	82.0	79.7	84.5	4.8	0.1	82.1	79.5	84.9	5.4	−0.6	81.5	79.0	84.2	5.2	−0.5
EL61	Thessaly	81.7	78.9	84.5	5.6	0.6	82.3	79.7	85.1	5.4	−0.8	81.5	78.9	84.2	5.3	−0.2
EL51	Eastern Macedonia and Thrace	80.6	78.2	83.0	4.8	0.5	81.1	78.9	83.2	4.3	−0.4	80.7	77.9	83.5	5.6	0.1

Data source: Eurostat

== Eurostat (2018—2022) ==
By default the table is sorted by 2022.

code	region	2018				2018 →2019	2019				2019 →2021	2021	2021 →2022	2022				2018 →2022
code	region	overall	male	female	F Δ M	2018 →2019	overall	male	female	F Δ M	2019 →2021	overall	2021 →2022	overall	male	female	F Δ M	2018 →2022
	Greece on average	81.9	79.3	84.4	5.1	−0.2	81.7	79.2	84.2	5.0	−1.5	80.2	0.6	80.8	78.3	83.4	5.1	−1.1
EL54	Epirus	83.6	81.3	86.0	4.7	0.4	84.0	81.7	86.4	4.7	−1.4	82.6	0.1	82.7	80.0	85.7	5.7	−0.9
EL41	North Aegean	82.9	80.2	85.6	5.4	−0.2	82.7	80.3	85.2	4.9	0.4	83.1	−0.8	82.3	79.9	84.9	5.0	−0.6
EL42	South Aegean	82.7	80.3	85.1	4.8	−0.4	82.3	80.5	84.3	3.8	−0.7	81.6	0.1	81.7	79.5	84.1	4.6	−1.0
EL43	Crete	82.6	80.1	85.1	5.0	−0.5	82.1	79.4	84.9	5.5	−0.4	81.7	0.0	81.7	78.9	84.7	5.8	−0.9
EL53	Western Macedonia	83.0	80.6	85.4	4.8	−0.5	82.5	80.1	85.0	4.9	−1.8	80.7	0.7	81.4	78.5	84.6	6.1	−1.6
EL61	Thessaly	82.6	80.0	85.3	5.3	−0.3	82.3	79.7	85.1	5.4	−2.3	80.0	1.1	81.1	78.5	83.8	5.3	−1.5
EL30	Attica	81.3	78.4	84.0	5.6	−0.1	81.2	78.4	83.8	5.4	−1.4	79.8	1.1	80.9	78.4	83.2	4.8	−0.4
EL65	Peloponnese	82.1	79.4	85.1	5.7	0.0	82.1	79.5	84.9	5.4	−1.3	80.8	0.0	80.8	78.3	83.6	5.3	−1.3
EL64	Central Greece	82.3	79.6	85.1	5.5	−0.5	81.8	79.5	84.2	4.7	−1.3	80.5	0.2	80.7	78.0	83.6	5.6	−1.6
EL62	Ionian Islands	81.3	79.2	83.5	4.3	0.1	81.4	79.6	83.2	3.6	−0.7	80.7	−0.2	80.5	77.9	83.2	5.3	−0.8
EL63	Western Greece	81.7	79.2	84.3	5.1	−0.2	81.5	79.1	83.9	4.8	−1.2	80.3	0.0	80.3	77.8	83.0	5.2	−1.4
EL52	Central Macedonia	81.9	79.5	84.3	4.8	−0.2	81.7	79.4	84.0	4.6	−2.4	79.3	0.9	80.2	77.5	82.8	5.3	−1.7
EL51	Eastern Macedonia and Thrace	81.4	79.2	83.5	4.3	−0.3	81.1	78.9	83.2	4.3	−1.8	79.3	0.6	79.9	77.3	82.5	5.2	−1.5

Data source: Eurostat

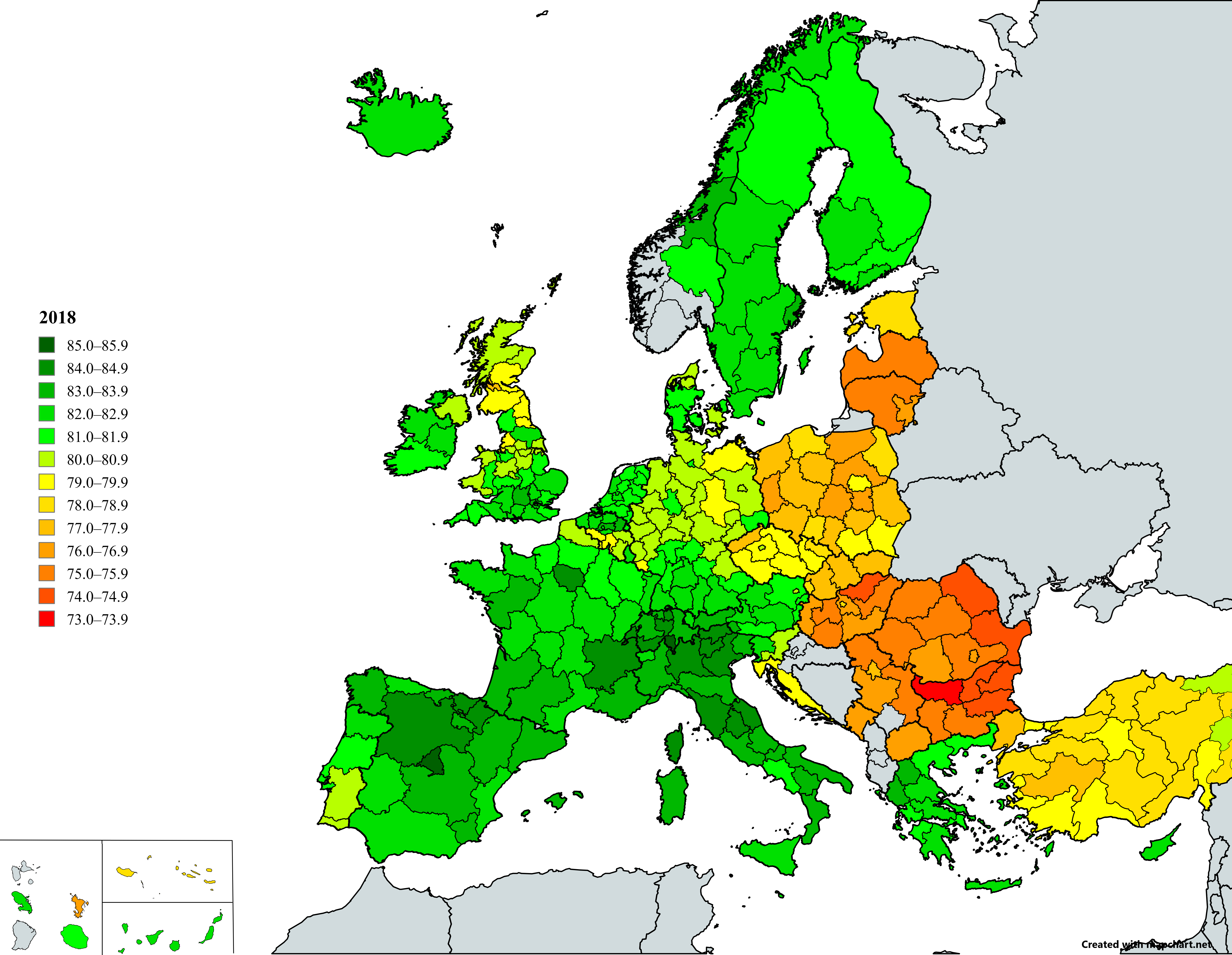
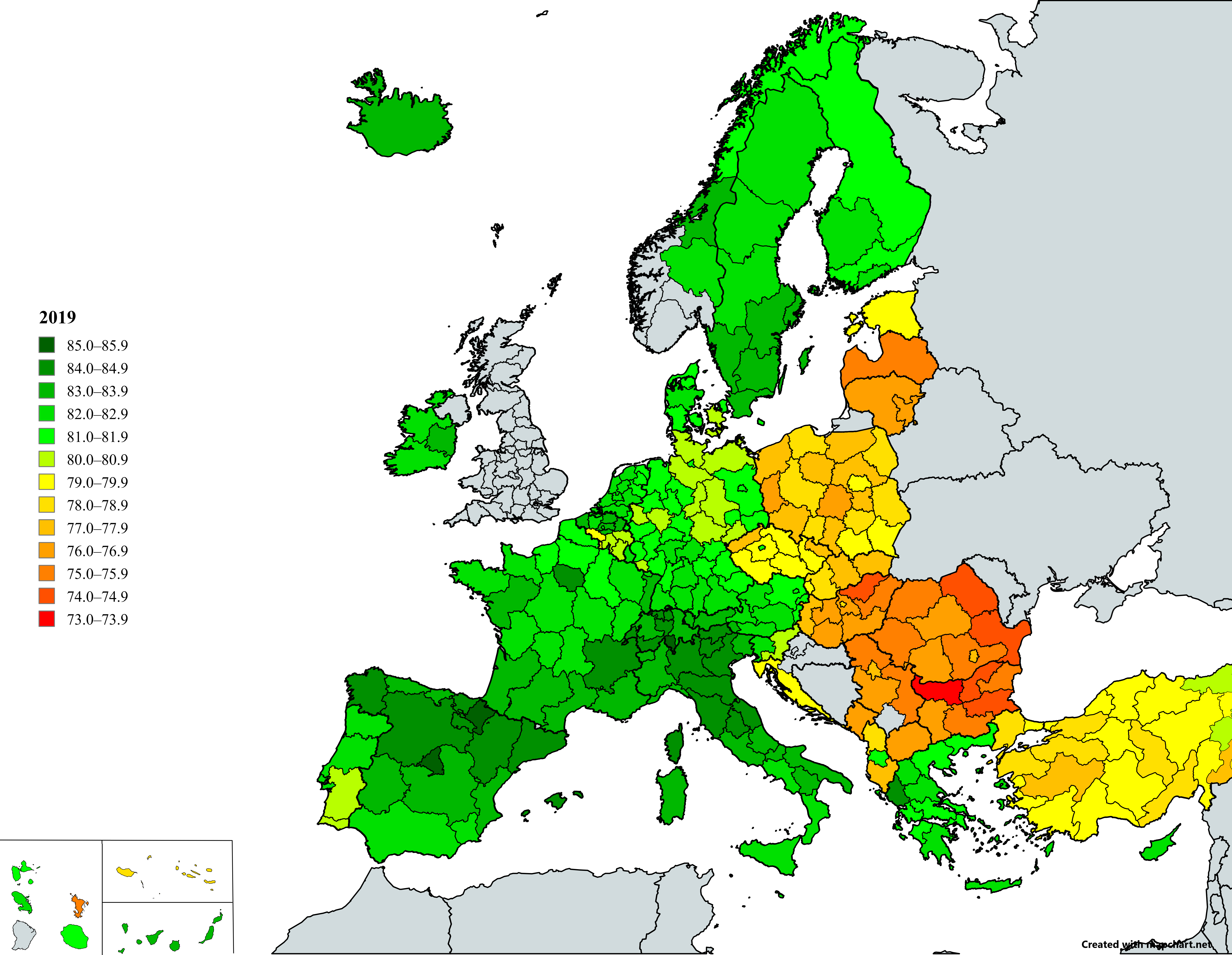
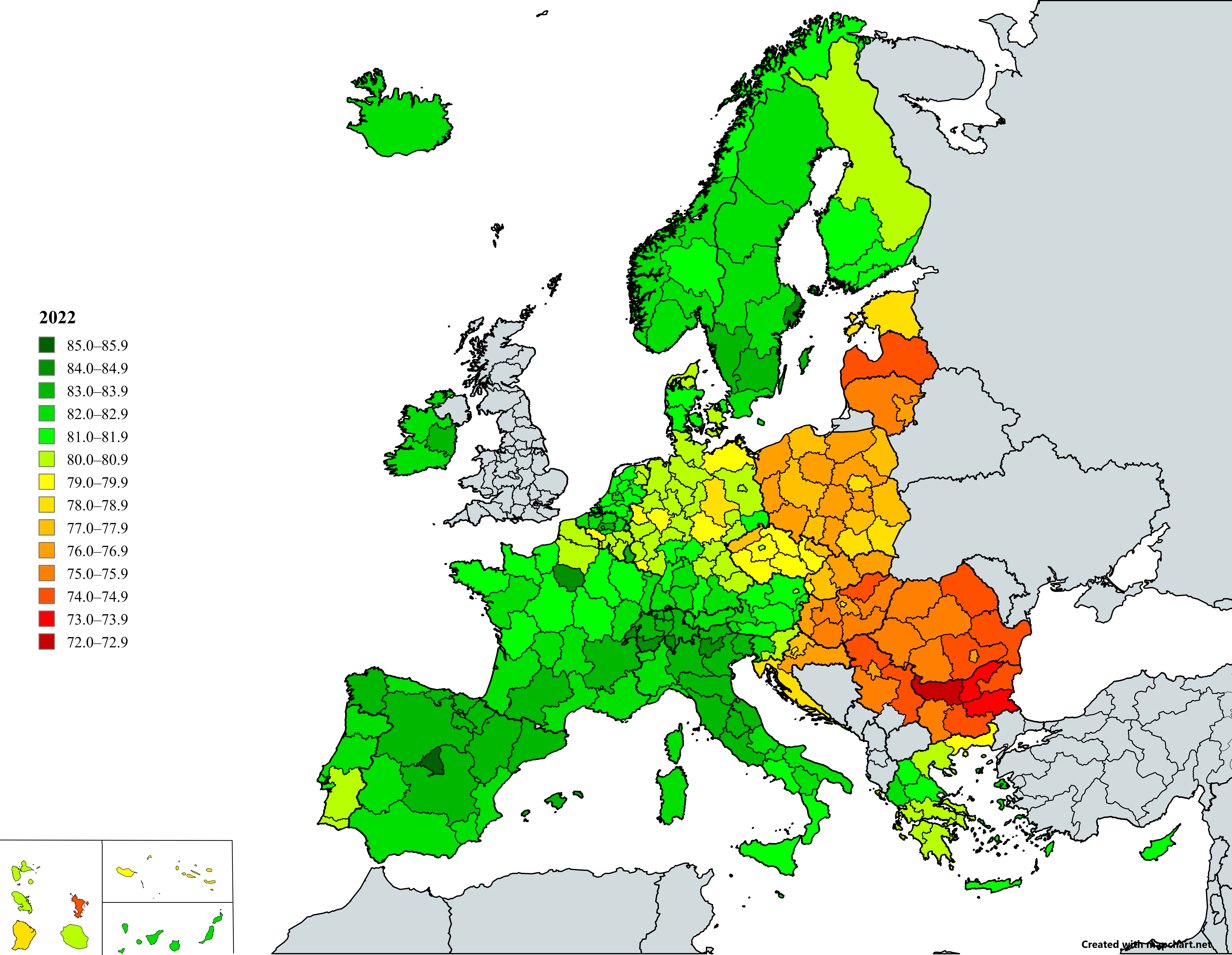
Life expectancy in Greek regions in comparison with regions of other European countries in 2018, 2019 and 2022, according to Eurostat (legends on the maps are identical)

== Global Data Lab (2018–2022) ==
region	2018				2018 →2019	2019				2019 →2021	2021	2021 →2022	2022				2018 →2022
region	overall	male	female	F Δ M	2018 →2019	overall	male	female	F Δ M	2019 →2021	overall	2021 →2022	overall	male	female	F Δ M	2018 →2022
Greece on average	81.39	78.76	84.12	5.36	−0.14	81.25	78.71	83.86	5.15	−1.14	80.11	0.50	80.61	78.02	83.32	5.30	−0.78
Epirus	83.10	80.78	85.65	4.87	0.44	83.54	81.21	86.07	4.86	−1.02	82.52	−0.06	82.46	79.75	85.59	5.84	−0.64
North Aegean	82.40	79.69	85.25	5.56	−0.15	82.25	79.82	84.88	5.06	0.77	83.02	−0.96	82.06	79.65	84.79	5.14	−0.34
South Aegean	82.20	79.79	84.75	4.96	−0.35	81.85	80.02	83.98	3.96	−0.33	81.52	−0.06	81.46	79.25	83.99	4.74	−0.74
Crete	82.10	79.59	84.75	5.16	−0.45	81.65	78.93	84.58	5.65	−0.03	81.62	−0.16	81.46	78.65	84.59	5.94	−0.64
Western Macedonia	82.50	80.08	85.05	4.97	−0.45	82.05	79.62	84.68	5.06	−1.43	80.62	0.54	81.16	78.26	84.49	6.23	−1.34
Thessaly	82.10	79.49	84.95	5.46	−0.25	81.85	79.23	84.78	5.55	−1.93	79.92	0.95	80.87	78.26	83.69	5.43	−1.23
Attica	80.81	77.90	83.66	5.76	−0.05	80.76	77.93	83.48	5.55	−1.04	79.72	0.95	80.67	78.16	83.09	4.93	−0.14
Peloponnese	81.61	78.89	84.75	5.86	0.04	81.65	79.03	84.58	5.55	−0.93	80.72	−0.15	80.57	78.06	83.49	5.43	−1.04
Central Greece	81.80	79.09	84.75	5.66	−0.45	81.35	79.03	83.88	4.85	−0.93	80.42	0.05	80.47	77.76	83.49	5.73	−1.33
Ionian Islands	80.81	78.69	83.16	4.47	0.14	80.95	79.13	82.88	3.75	−0.33	80.62	−0.35	80.27	77.66	83.09	5.43	−0.54
Western Greece	81.21	78.69	83.96	5.27	−0.16	81.05	78.63	83.58	4.95	−0.83	80.22	−0.15	80.07	77.56	82.89	5.33	−1.14
Central Macedonia	81.41	78.99	83.96	4.97	−0.16	81.25	78.93	83.68	4.75	−2.02	79.23	0.74	79.97	77.26	82.69	5.43	−1.44
Eastern Macedonia and Thrace	80.91	78.69	83.16	4.47	−0.25	80.66	78.43	82.88	4.45	−1.43	79.23	0.44	79.67	77.06	82.39	5.33	−1.24

Data source: Global Data Lab

== Charts ==
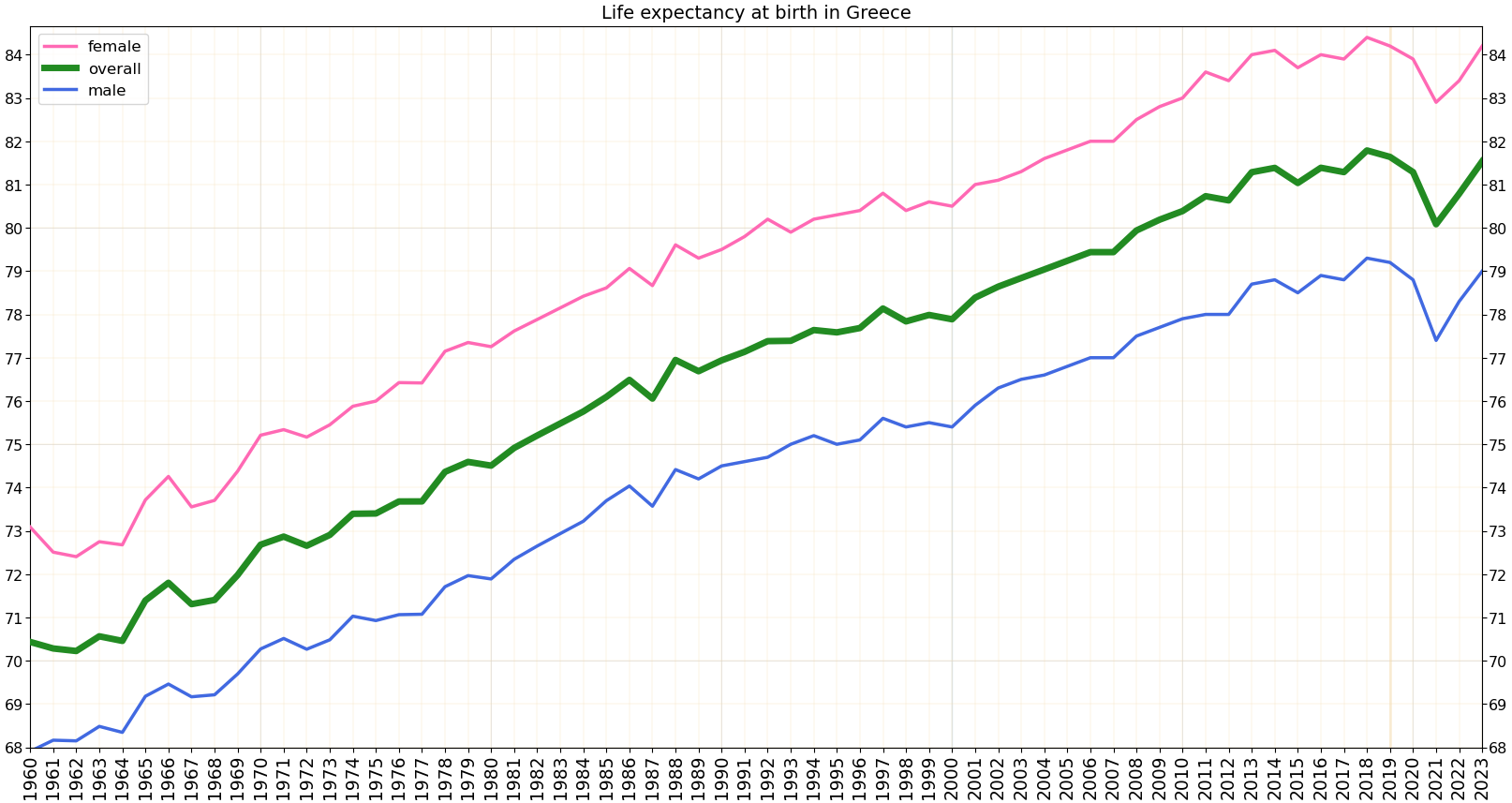
Development of life expectancy in Greece according to estimation of the World Bank Group

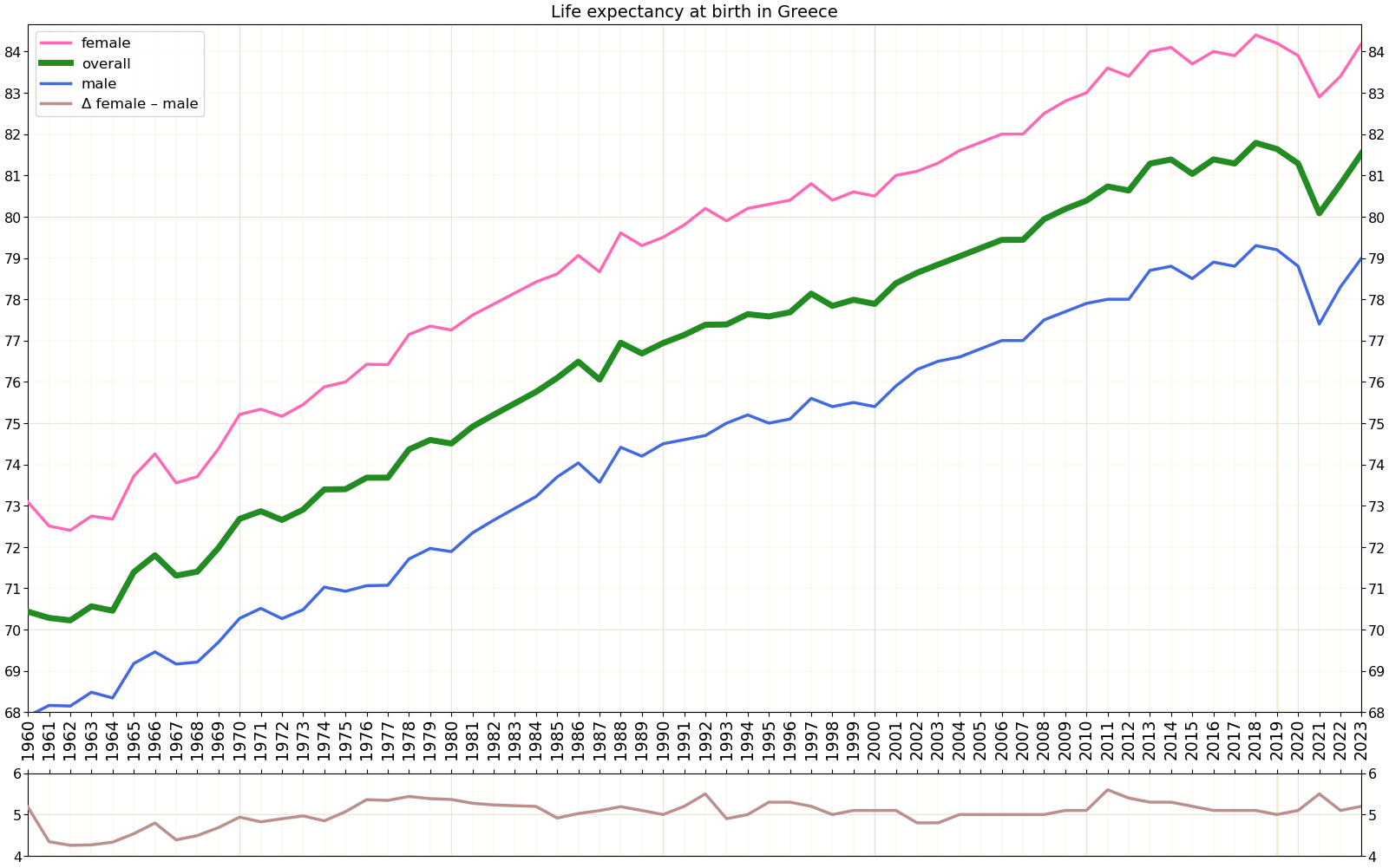
Life expectancy with calculated sex gap

Life expectancy in Greece according to estimation of Our World in Data

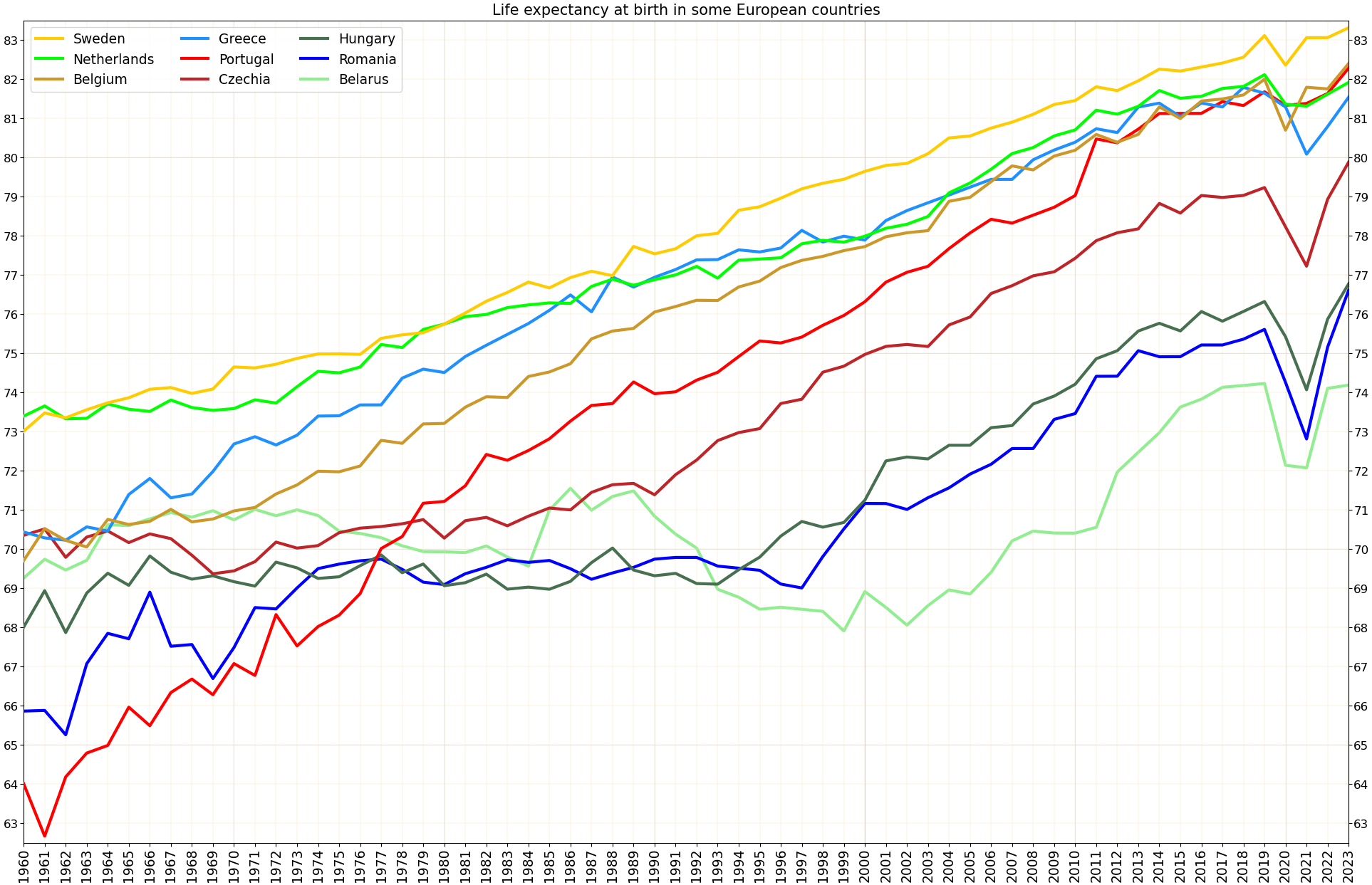
Development of life expectancy in Greece in comparison to some European countries
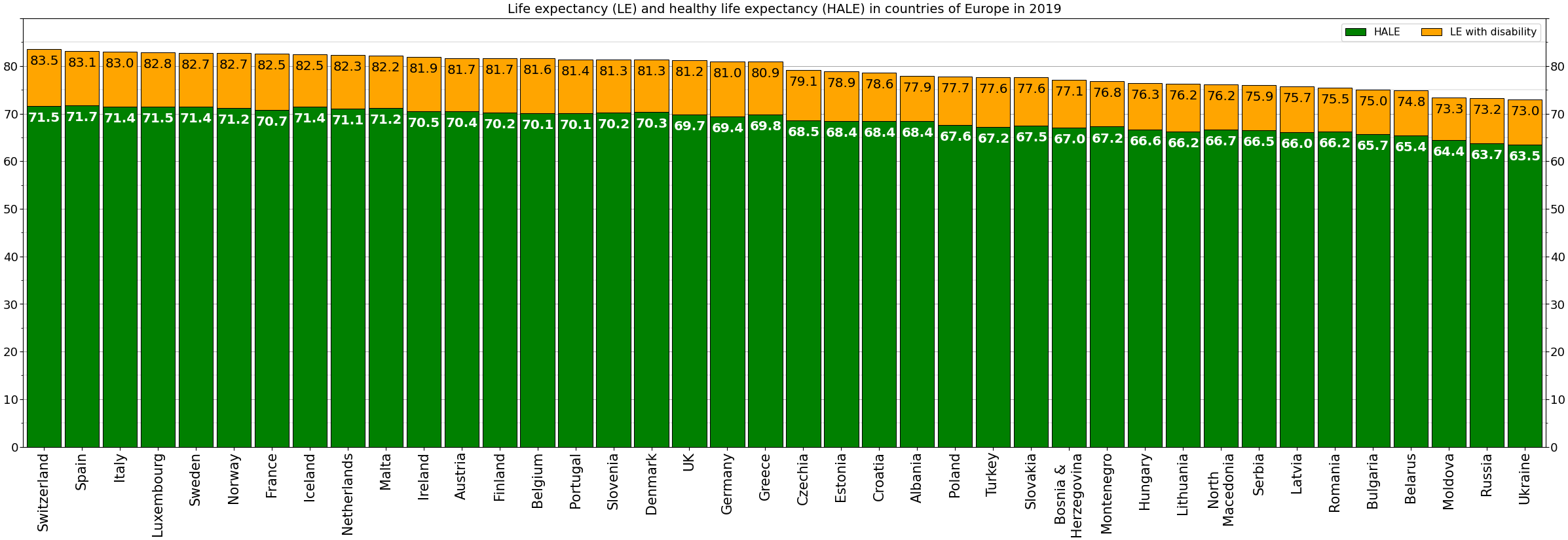
Life expectancy and healthy life expectancy in Greece on the background of other countries of Europe in 2019

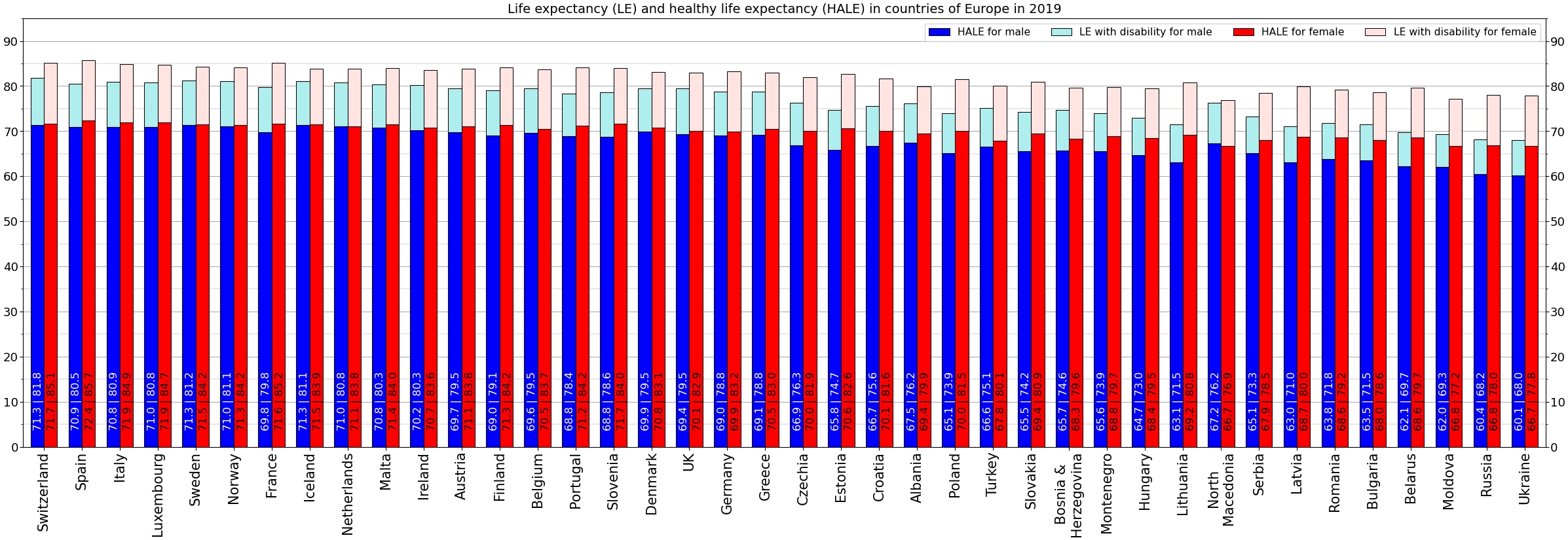
Life expectancy and healthy life expectancy for males and females separately

== See also ==
- List of countries by life expectancy
- List of European countries by life expectancy
- Administrative divisions of Greece
- Demographics of Greece
