= Argoules, Chania =

Village in Crete, Greece

Coordinates: 35°11′52″N 24°16′51″E

Argoules Αργουλές
- Hamlet
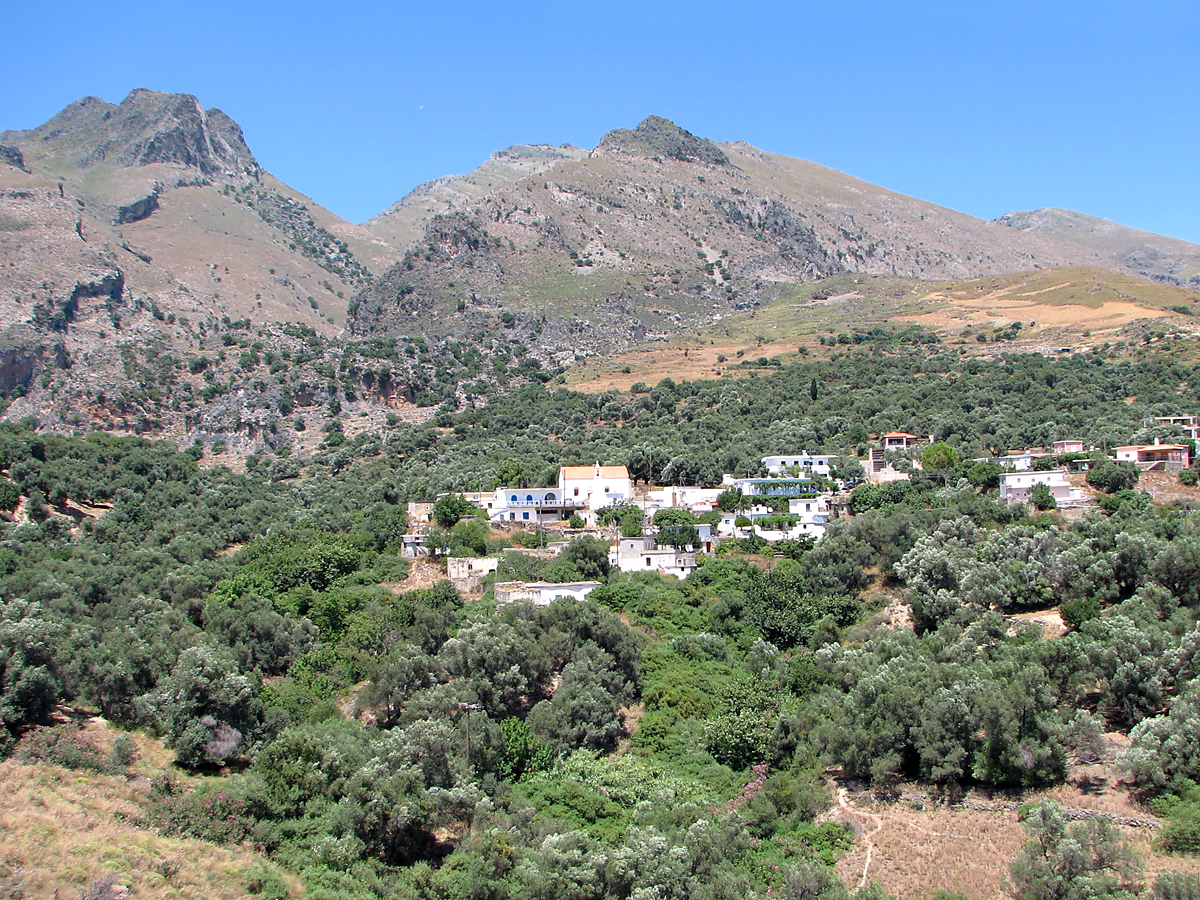
- Interactive map of Argoules
- Country: Greece
- Region: Crete
- Regional unit: Chania
- Municipality: Sfakia
- Elevation: 120 m (390 ft)

Population (2021)
  - Total: 64

Argoules (Greek: Αργουλές) is a semi-mountainous hamlet in Sfakia municipality on the island of Crete, Greece. It is the easternmost settlement of the Chania regional unit, located at a distance of about 85 km from the city of Chania. The time of its establishment is unknown, however Argoules is mentioned in Venetian registers as early as the sixteenth century (1577), belonging to the Territorio di Rettimo.

Argoules is built at an altitude of 120 m at the foot of Lefka Ori, offering a scenic view of the coast and the Libyan Sea. The nearest beach is Agia Marina to the south. Most of Argoules' inhabitants are free-range sheep and goat farmers, who move their herds in transhumance to the village of Kallikratis in the summer. A namesake gorge (Argouliano) extends from the Manikas plateau to Argoules and constitutes an important natural habitat. Argoules is on a branch of the E4 path that extends from Frangokastello to Kato Rodakino.

A small early Minoan settlement has been identified on the Chalepa (Greek: Χαλέπα) hill midway between Argoules and Rodakino, approx. 1 km north of the sea. It has also been suggested that the ancient city of Apollonias (Greek: Απολλωνιάς) was located amidst Argoules and Skaloti.
