= Piraeus Prefecture =

Coordinates: 37°57′N 23°38′E

Piraeus Νομός Πειραιά
- Former prefecture
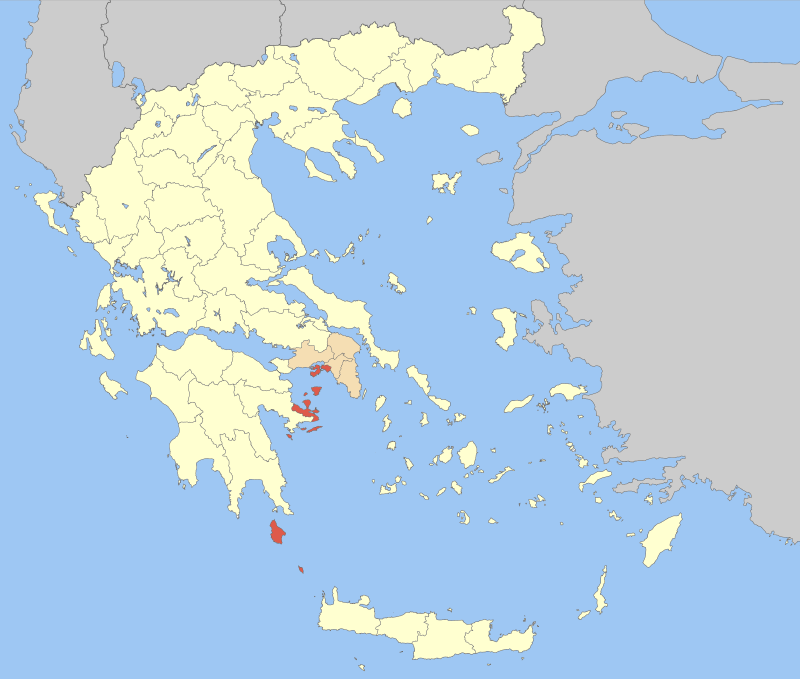
- Location of Piraeus in Greece

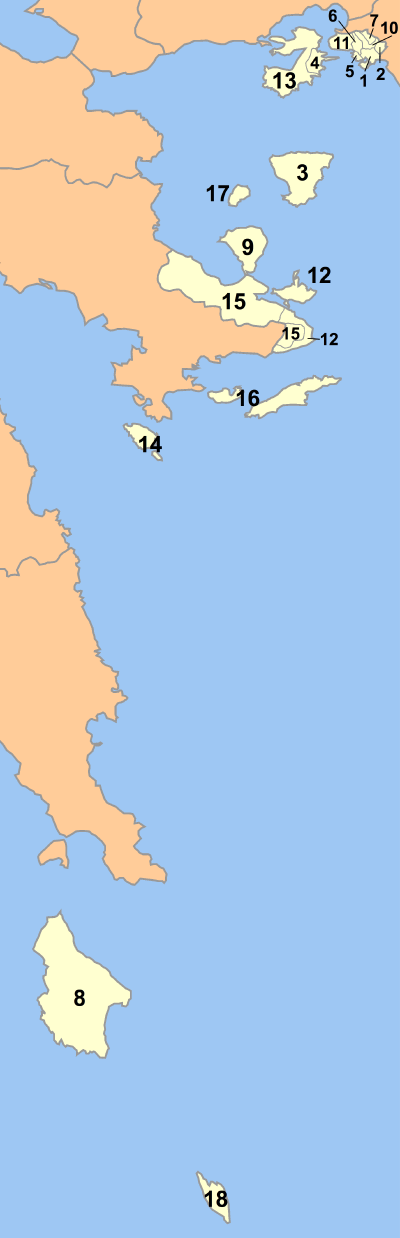
- Location of municipalities within Piraeus Prefecture
- Country: Greece
- Periphery: Attica
- Established: 1972
- Disestablished: 2010
- Capital: Piraeus
- Subdivisions: List: 5 provinces; 16 municipalities; 2 communities

Area
  - Total: 929 km^{2} (359 sq mi)
  - Rank: 47th

Population (2001)
  - Total: 541,504
  - Rank: 3rd
  - Density: 583/km^{2} (1,510/sq mi)
  - Rank: 2nd
- Postal codes: 1xx xx, 801 xx
- Area codes: 21x, 2736
- ISO 3166 code: GR-A4
- Vehicle registration: ΥΝ
- Website: nomarhiapeiraia.gr

Piraeus Prefecture (Greek: Νομός Πειραιά or Νομός Πειραιώς) was one of the prefectures of Greece. Created in 1964 as a separate Prefecture (Νομός) and after the dissolution of the prefecture in 1972 was one of the 4 prefectures (Νομαρχίες) of Attica prefecture, and from 1994, part of the Athens-Piraeus super-prefecture (1994–2011). The capital of the prefecture was Piraeus. As a part of the 2011 Kallikratis Programme, the prefecture was abolished, and its territory was divided into two regional units: Islands and Piraeus.

== History ==
The prefecture covered the south-western part of the agglomeration of Athens, several islands in the Saronic Gulf (Salamis, Aegina, Agkistri, Poros, Hydra, Dokos, Spetses, Spetsopoula), Methana and Troizina on the Peloponnese peninsula, and the islands of Kythira and Antikythera south of the Peloponnese. An indication of the geographical diversity of the prefecture was the stark difference in population density between its seven mainland municipalities in the Athens urban area, which have 9,244.2 inhabitants/km^{2}, and its detached outlying areas, which average only 85.83 inhabitants/km^{2} (and most of these on Salamis Island, at 395.40/km^{2}, while the far-outlying parts have only 47.80/km^{2}).

== Municipalities and communities ==
Municipality	# on map opposite	Greek name	Seat (if different)	YPES code
Aegina	3	Αίγινα		4003
Agios Ioannis Rentis	2	Άγιος Ιωάννης Ρέντη		4001
Agkistri	17	Αγκίστρι	Megalochóri	4002
Ampelakia	4	Αμπελάκια		4004
Antikythera	18	Αντικύθηρα	Potamós	4005
Drapetsona	5	Δραπετσώνα		4006
Hydra	16	Ύδρα		4018
Keratsini	6	Κερατσίνι		4007
Korydallos	7	Κορυδαλλός		4008
Kythira	8	Κύθηρα		4009
Methana	9	Μέθανα		4010
Nikaia	10	Νίκαια		4011
Perama	11	Πέραμα		4013
Piraeus	1	Πειραιάς		4012
Poros	12	Πόρος		4014
Salamina (Salamis)	13	Σαλαμίνα		4015
Spetses	14	Σπέτσες		4016
Troizina	15	Τροιζήνα	Galatas, Troizina	4017

== Provinces ==
- Province of Salamis - Salamina
- Province of Aegina - Aegina
- Province of Troizinia - Methana
- Province of Hydra and Spetses - Hydra
- Province of Kythira - Kythira
- Province of Piraeus - Piraeus

Note: Provinces no longer hold any legal status in Greece.
