= Eastern Macedonia and Thrace =

Administrative region of Greece

- Administrative region of Greece
- Logo

- Coordinates: 41.2°N 25.0°E
- Country: Greece
- Decentralized Administration: Macedonia and Thrace
- Geographic regions: Macedonia, Thrace
- Capital: Komotini
- Largest city: Alexandroupolis
- Regional units: List: Drama; Evros; Kavala; Rhodope; Thasos; Xanthi

Government
  - Governor: Christodoulos Topsidis (New Democracy)

Area
  - Total: 14,157.76 km^{2} (5,466.34 sq mi)

Population (2021)
  - Total: 562,201
  - Density: 39.7097/km^{2} (102.848/sq mi)
- Demonym(s): Macedonian, Thracian

GDP
  - Total: €8.588 billion (2024)
  - Per capita: €15,200 (2024)
- Time zone: UTC+02:00 (EET)
  - Summer (DST): UTC+03:00 (EEST)
- ISO 3166 code: GR-A
- HDI (2023): 0.876 very high · 13th of 13
- Website: www.pamth.gov.gr

Eastern Macedonia and Thrace (/ˌmæsəˈdoʊniə/ MASS-ə-DOH-nee-ə; Greek: Ανατολική Μακεδονία και Θράκη, romanized: Anatolikí Makedonía ke Thráki, [anatoliˈci maceðoˈnia ce ˈθraci]) is one of the thirteen administrative regions of Greece. It consists of the eastern parts of Northern Greece, comprising the eastern part of Greek Macedonia along with Greek Thrace, and the islands of Thasos and Samothrace.

== Administration ==
=== Administrative history ===
The region of Eastern Macedonia and Thrace was established in the 1987 administrative reform as the Eastern Macedonia and Thrace Region (Greek: Περιφέρεια Ανατολικής Μακεδονίας και Θράκης, romanized: Periféria Anatolikís Makedhonías ke Thrákis. With the 2010 Kallikratis plan, its powers and authority were redefined and extended, with the preexisting region in many respects inheriting status and weight of the five now abolished prefectures, Drama, Evros, Kavala, Rhodope and Xanthi.

In this special case, the region of Eastern Macedonia and Thrace also succeeds the intermediate structure of the two super-prefectures of Drama-Kavala-Xanthi and of Rhodope-Evros into which the five prefectures had been grouped since 1994.

=== Current status ===
The capital of the region is Komotini, which by population is the fourth largest city, following Alexandroupolis, Kavala and Xanthi. The region is divided into the Macedonian regional units of Drama, Kavala and Thasos and the Thracian regional units of Xanthi, Rhodope and Evros, which coincide with the territory of the former prefectures, except for Thasos, which was part of the Kavala prefecture. Unlike the former prefectures, the regional units however have very limited administrative powers.

Along with Central Macedonia, the region is supervised by the Decentralized Administration of Macedonia and Thrace based at Thessaloniki.

=== Regional governor ===
The political office of regional governor was also created by the Kallikratis reform and may be considered the successor of the former prefects. The current governor is Christodoulos Topsidis, who took office on 1 January 2024.

== Economy ==
The Gross domestic product (GDP) of the region was 7.2 billion € in 2018, accounting for 3.9% of Greek economic output. GDP per capita adjusted for purchasing power was €14,300 or 48% of the EU27 average in the same year. The GDP per employee was 61% of the EU average. Eastern Macedonia and Thrace is the region in Greece with the second lowest GDP per capita and one of the poorest regions in the EU.

== History ==
=== Ancient era ===
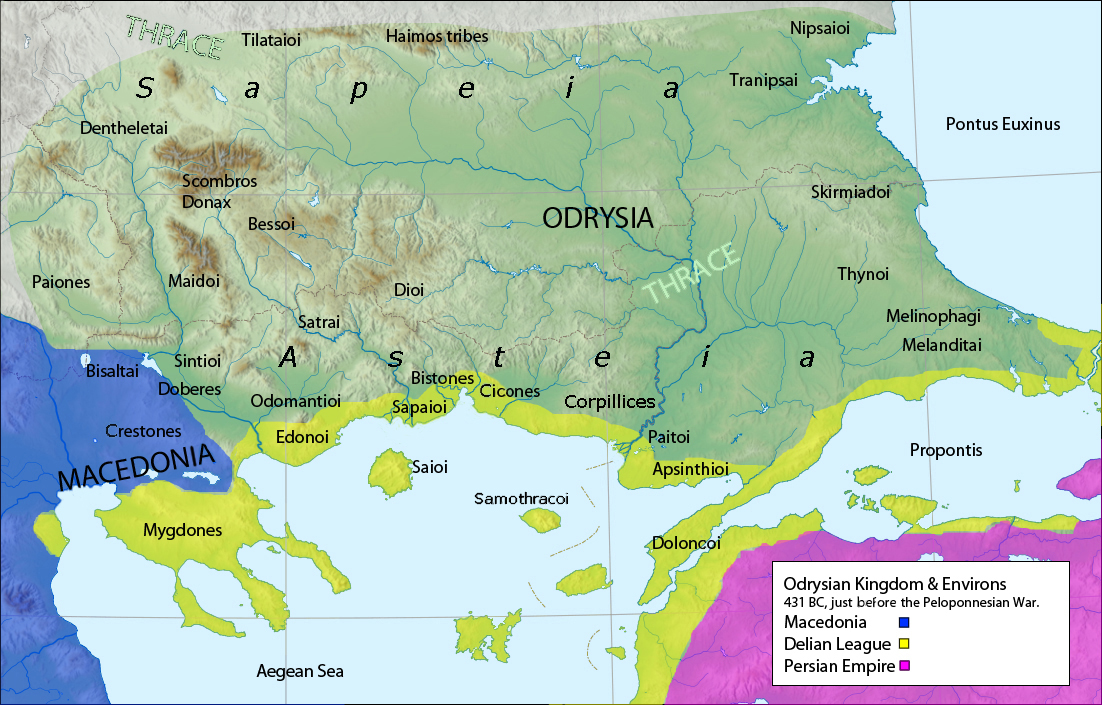
Thrace in the Odrysian Kingdom, showing several Thracian tribes. Thrace's coastal areas in the Delian League and Macedon to the West. Sapeia was Northern Thrace and Asteia was Southern Thrace

=== Medieval era ===
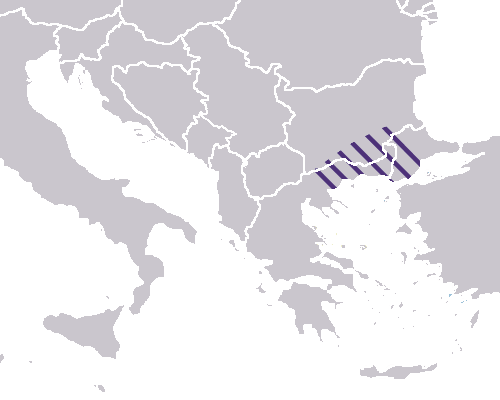
Approximate widest extent of the theme of Macedonia, superimposed on modern borders. It covers most of Eastern Macedonia and Thrace.

== Demographics ==
The region is home to Greece's main Muslim minority, made up mainly of Pomaks and Western Thrace Turks, whose presence dates to the Ottoman period. Unlike the Muslims of Macedonia, Epirus, and elsewhere in northern Greece, they were exempted from the Greek-Turkish population exchange following the 1923 Treaty of Lausanne. These Muslim minority populations are distinct from the Ottoman-era Greek Muslims, such as the Vallahades of Western Macedonia, who were expatriated to Turkey as part of the population exchange.

According to the 1991 census, the Muslim minority numbered around 98,000 people or 29% of the population of Thrace, of which about half were Western Thrace Turks and the rest (35%) Pomaks and Muslim Romani people (15%). In the 2014 European elections in Greece, 42,533 people from Eastern Macedonia and Thrace voted for the Party of Friendship, Equality and Peace.

The region has shrunk by 46,113 people between 2011 and 2021, experiencing a population loss of 7.6%.

== Major municipalities ==
- Alexandroúpoli (Αλεξανδρούπολη) - 71,751 people
- Kavála (Καβάλα) - 66,376 people
- Xánthi (Ξάνθη) - 66,162 people
- Komotiní (Κομοτηνή) - 65,243 people
- Dráma (Δράμα) - 58,944 people

== Other towns and villages ==
- Abdera
- Chrysoupoli
- Didymoteicho
- Doxato
- Eleftheres
- Eleftheroupoli
- Evlalo
- Feres
- Filippoi
- Fillyra
- Iasmos
- Kato Nevrokopi
- Maroneia
- Myki
- Orestiada
- Prosotsani
- Sapes
- Soufli
- Thasos
- Samothrace

== Airports ==
- Kavala International Airport "Alexander the Great"
- Alexandroupoli International Airport "Democritus"

== Archaeological sites ==
- Philippi
- Abdera
- Didymoteicho Fortress
- Trajanopolis
- Samothrace temple complex

== See also ==
- List of Thracian Greeks
- List of Macedonians (Greek)
- Macedonian Greek
- List of Pontic Greeks
- Cappadocian Greeks
