= Decentralized Administration of Macedonia and Thrace =

Decentralized administration in Greece

- Αποκεντρωμένη Διοίκηση; Μακεδονίας–Θράκης
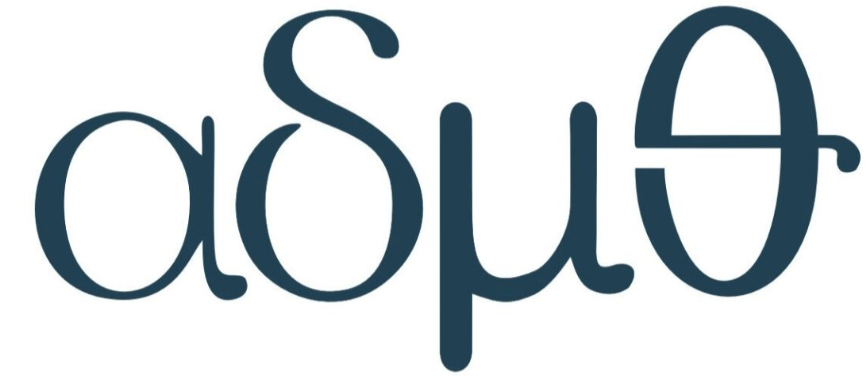

Agency overview
- Formed: 1 January 2011
- Jurisdiction: Government of Greece
- Headquarters: Thessaloniki, Central Macedonia
- Agency executive: Acting Secretary-General
- Website: www.damt.gov.gr

Map
- Location of Macedonia and Thrace in Greece

Area served
- Supervised regions: Central Macedonia, Eastern Macedonia and Thrace
- Regional units: 13
- Municipalities: 60
- Area: 32,968 km^{2} (12,729 sq mi)
- Population: 2,490,290 (as of 2011)

The Decentralized Administration of Macedonia and Thrace (Greek: Αποκεντρωμένη Διοίκηση Μακεδονίας–Θράκης, romanized: Apokentrōménī Dioíkīsī Makedonías–Thrákīs) is one of the seven decentralized administrations of Greece, consisting of the peripheries of Central Macedonia and Eastern Macedonia and Thrace. The region is centered in the metropolitan city of Thessaloniki in Central Macedonia.

== Formation and tasks ==
Decentralized Administrations were created in January 2011 as part of a far-reaching reform of the country's administrative structure, the Kallikratis reform (Law 3852/2010).

They enjoy both administrative and financial autonomy and exercise devolved state powers in urban planning, environmental and energy policy, forestry, migration and citizenship. Beyond that, they are tasked with supervising the first and second-level self-governing bodies: the municipalities and regions, in this case the 60 municipalities of Central Macedonia and of Eastern Macedonia and Thrace, and the two regions themselves.

== Characteristics ==
Covering an area of 32,968 km^{2} (12,729 sq mi) Macedonia and Thrace is the largest of the seven decentralized administrations by area, and with an overall population of 2,490,290 it is also the second most populated one, following the Decentralized Administration of Attica.

In the revised European NUTS nomenclature, the two regions of Macedonia and Thrace together with the two regions of the Decentralized Administration of Epirus and Western Macedonia form the first level NUTS region EL5 (Voreia Ellada).

== Secretary-General ==
The Decentralized Administration is led by a secretary-general (Γενικός Γραμματέας) who is appointed or dismissed by a Cabinet decision upon request of the Greek Minister of Interior, and is therefore considered the senior representative of the national government in the regions.

Following the electoral victory of Syriza in January 2015, the new Minister for the Interior, Nikos Voutsis, declared that the decentralized administrations would be abolished, and their powers transferred to the regions. Until this reform is formalized, and as the Secretaries-General appointed by the previous administration resigned on 2 February, the decentralized administrations are run by their senior civil servants as Acting Secretaries-General.

=== List of secretaries-general ===
Since its establishment in 2011, the following General Secretaries have been appointed:

- Efthimios Sokos, January 2011 – August 2012
- Athanasios Karountzos (PASOK), August 2012 – February 2015

== Literature ==
- Ministry of Interior (January 2013). "Structure and operation of local and regional democracy". Council of Europe.
