= Decentralized Administration of Epirus and Western Macedonia =

Top-level regional administrative unit in Greece

- Αποκεντρωμένη Διοίκηση; Ηπείρου – Δυτικής Μακεδονίας

Agency overview
- Formed: 1 January 2011
- Jurisdiction: Government of Greece
- Headquarters: Ioannina, Epirus
- Agency executive: Vasileios Michelakis, Acting Secretary-General
- Website: www.apdhp-dm.gov.gr

Map
- Location of Epirus and Western Macedonia in Greece

Area served
- Supervised regions: Epirus, Western Macedonia
- Regional units: 8
- Municipalities: 30
- Area: 18,654 km^{2} (7,202 sq mi)
- Population: 620,545 (as of 2011)

The Decentralized Administration of Epirus and Western Macedonia (Greek: Αποκεντρωμένη Διοίκηση Ηπείρου – Δυτικής Μακεδονίας) is one of the seven decentralized administrations of Greece, consisting of the peripheries of Epirus and Western Macedonia. Seated in Ioannina, Epirus, it is currently led by Acting Secretary-General Vasileios Michelakis.

== Formation and tasks ==
Decentralized Administrations were created in January 2011 as part of a far-reaching reform of the country's administrative structure, the Kallikratis reform (Law 3852/2010).

They enjoy both administrative and financial autonomy and exercise devolved state powers in urban planning, environmental and energy policy, forestry, migration and citizenship. Beyond that, they are tasked with supervising the first and second-level self-governing bodies: the municipalities and regions, in this case the 30 municipalities of Epirus and Western Macedonia, and the two regions themselves.

== Characteristics ==
Covering an area of 18,654 km^{2} (7,202 sq mi) Epirus and Western Macedonia is medium-sized by area. With an overall population of 620,545, it is however one of the least populated of the seven decentralized administrations in Greece, second only to the Decentralized Administration of the Aegean.

In the revised European NUTS nomenclature, the regions of Epirus and Western Macedonia together with the two regions of the Decentralized Administration of Macedonia and Thrace form the first level NUTS region EL5 (Voreia Ellada).

== Secretary-General ==
The Decentralized Administration is led by a Secretary-General (Γενικός Γραμματέας) who is appointed or dismissed by a Cabinet decision upon request of the Greek Minister of Interior, and is therefore considered the senior representative of the national government in the regions.

Following the electoral victory of Syriza in January 2015, the new Minister for the Interior, Nikos Voutsis, declared that the decentralized administrations would be abolished, and their powers transferred to the regions. Until this reform is formalized, and as the Secretaries-General appointed by the previous administration resigned on 2 February, the decentralized administrations are run by their senior civil servants as Acting Secretaries-General.

Current Acting Secretary-General is Vasileios Michelakis.

=== List of General Secretaries ===
Since its establishment in 2011, the following General Secretaries have been appointed:

- Dimitra Georgakopoulou-Basta, January 2011 – August 2012
- Ilias Theodoridis, August 2012 – August 2013
- Eftaxa Basiliki, August 2013 – February 2015
- Vasileios Michelakis, since February 2015

== Literature ==
- Ministry of Interior (January 2013). "Structure and operation of local and regional democracy". Council of Europe.
