= Decentralized Administration of Crete =

- Αποκεντρωμένη Διοίκηση Κρήτης

Agency overview
- Formed: 1 January 2011
- Jurisdiction: Government of Greece
- Headquarters: Heraklion, Crete
- Agency executive: Secretary-General
- Website: www.apdkritis.gov.gr

Map
- Location of Crete in Greece

Area served
- Supervised region: Crete
- Regional units: 4
- Municipalities: 24
- Area: 8,336 km^{2} (3,219 sq mi)
- Population: 623,065 (as of 2011)

The Decentralized Administration of Crete (Greek: Αποκεντρωμένη Διοίκηση Κρήτης) is one of the seven decentralized administrations of Greece, solely consisting of the region of Crete. Its seat is in Heraklion.

== Formation and tasks ==
Decentralized Administrations were created in January 2011 as part of a far-reaching reform of the country's administrative structure, the Kallikratis reform (Law 3852/2010).

They enjoy both administrative and financial autonomy and exercise devolved state powers in urban planning, environmental and energy policy, forestry, migration and citizenship. Beyond that, they are tasked with supervising the first and second-level self-governing bodies: the municipalities and regions, in this case the 24 municipalities of Crete and the region itself.

== Characteristics ==
Covering an area of 8,336 km^{2} (3,219 sq mi), Crete is one of the smallest of the seven decentralized administrations by area, second only to Attica. With an overall population of 623,065 it is also the third smallest decentralized administration by population, though having recently surpassed the much larger Decentralized Administration of Epirus and Western Macedonia.

In the European NUTS nomenclature, Crete together with the two regions of the Decentralized Administration of the Aegean forms the first level NUTS region EL4 (Nisia Aigaiou, Kriti).

== Secretary-General ==
The Decentralized Administration is led by a Secretary-General (Γενικός Γραμματέας) who is appointed or dismissed by a Cabinet decision upon request of the Greek Minister of Interior, and is therefore considered the senior representative of the national government in the regions.

Following the electoral victory of Syriza in January 2015, the new Minister for the Interior, Nikos Voutsis, declared that the decentralized administrations would be abolished, and their powers transferred to the regions. Until this reform is formalized, and as the Secretaries-General appointed by the previous administration resigned on 2 February, the decentralized administrations are run by their senior civil servants as Acting Secretaries-General.

== Literature ==
- Ministry of Interior (January 2013). "Structure and operation of local and regional democracy". Council of Europe.
