= Kleisthenis I Programme =

Greek administrative reform

Hellenic Republic
- Long title: New Architecture of Self-governing Entities and Deconcentrated Administration – Kleisthenis I Programme
- Citation: Kleisthenis I Programme (4555/2018) (in Greek). 19 July 2018.
- Territorial extent: Greece
- Enacted by: Hellenic Parliament
- Signed by: President Prokopis Pavlopoulos
- Signed: 19 July 2018

Legislative history
- Bill title: 4555/2018
- Introduced by: Government of Greece

Kleisthenis I Programme (Greek: Πρόγραμμα Κλεισθένης Ι, romanized: Prógramma Kleisthénis I) is the common name of Greek law 4555/2018 of July 2018, a major administrative reform in Greece. It brought about the third major reform of the country's administrative divisions following the 1997 Kapodistrias reform and the 2010 Kallikratis Programme. Named after ancient Greek legislator Cleisthenes, the programme was adopted by the Hellenic Parliament in July 2018 and implemented in September 2019.

The goal of the Kleisthenis I Programme was to reform the election procedures and to strengthen the competences of the local administrative units. The main changes were:

- municipal elections take place every 4 years (formerly every 5 years)
- municipal and regional referendums can be organised
- six categories of municipalities were introduced
- the distinction between municipal communities and local communities (as subdivisions of municipalities) was abolished

Also, five municipalities that were created at the Kallikratis reform (Corfu, Cephalonia, Servia-Velventos, Lesbos and Samos) were divided into smaller municipalities.

== See also ==
- List of municipalities of Greece (2011)
- Administrative divisions of Greece
- Municipalities and communities of Greece
