= Argolis and Corinthia Prefecture =

Argolis and Corinthia Prefecture Νομός Ἀργολίδος καὶ Κορινθίας
- Former prefecture
- Country: Greece
- Established: 1833
- Disestablished: 1947
- Capital: Nafplio
  - Rank: List of the prefectures of Greece by area
  - Rank: List of the prefectures of Greece by population

Argolis and Corinthia Prefecture (Greek: Νομός Ἀργολίδος καὶ Κορινθίας), commonly known as Argolidocorinthia (Ἀργολιδοκορινθία), was one of the prefectures of Greece. Its capital was Nafplio. It was one of the first prefectures established, first in 1833–1836 and again from 1845 until 1899, when it was split into Argolis Prefecture and Corinthia Prefecture. The split was reversed in the 1909 administrative reform, and the prefecture existed until split again in 1947.

The northern half became Corinthia with its capital at the city of Corinth, the southern half became Argolis with its capital at Nafplio. The islands Hydra, Spetses, and Kythira in the south became part of the Attica Prefecture.
