= Decentralized administrations of Greece =

First-level administrative subdivision

The decentralized administrations (Greek: αποκεντρωμένες διοικήσεις, romanized: apokentroménes dioikíseis) is a tier of the public administration of Greece. They are appointed by the national government to supervise the regions and municipalities within their territory. They were created in January 2011 as part of a far-reaching reform of the country's administrative structure, the Kallikratis reform (Law 3852/2010).

They are run by a government-appointed general secretary, assisted by an advisory council drawn from the regional governors and the representatives of the municipalities. They enjoy both administrative and financial autonomy and exercise devolved state powers in urban planning, environmental and energy policy, forestry, migration and citizenship. Beyond that, they are tasked with supervising the first and second-level self-governing bodies, the regions and municipalities.

== List of decentralized administrations ==
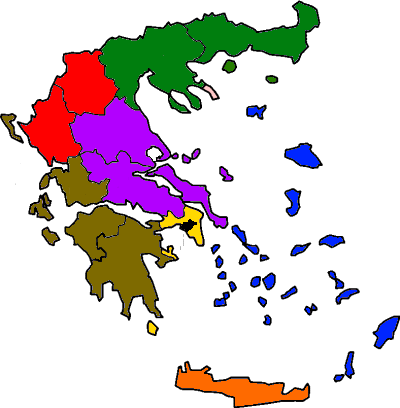
Kallikratis administrative divisions as of 2010

Decentralized Administration of Attica, with the capital of Athens
Decentralized Administration of Macedonia and Thrace, with the capital of Thessaloniki
Decentralized Administration of Epirus and Western Macedonia, with the capital of Ioannina
Decentralized Administration of Thessaly and Central Greece, with the capital of Larissa
Decentralized Administration of Peloponnese, Western Greece and the Ionian, with the capital of Patras
Decentralized Administration of the Aegean, with the capital of Piraeus
Decentralized Administration of Crete, with the capital of Heraklion

Monastic community of Mount Athos (excluded from the Kallikratis Plan)
