= Attica and Boeotia Prefecture =

Attica and Boeotia Νομός Ἀττικοβοιωτίας
- Former prefecture
- Country: Greece
- Established: 1833
- Disestablished: 1943
- Capital: Athens
  - Rank: List of the prefectures of Greece by area
  - Rank: List of the prefectures of Greece by population

Attica and Boeotia Prefecture (Greek: Νομὸς Ἀττικοβοιωτίας) was a prefecture of Greece, first established in 1833 and finally abolished in 1943.

== History ==
Attica and Boeotia Prefecture was first established in 1833; abolished in 1836 and split up into separate Attica and Boeotia prefectures; and reconstituted in 1845.

The prefecture was split up again into separate Attica and Boeotia prefectures in the 1899 reform, but this was reversed in 1909. At this time, the provinces of the combined prefecture were Attica province, Aegina province, Megaris province, Livadia province and Thiva province (Thebes Province). The capital of the prefecture was Athens.

The prefecture finally ceased to exist in 1943, when it was again split up into Attica and Boeotia prefectures.
