= Super-prefectures of Greece =

Former subdivision of Greece

The super-prefectures of Greece, with Athens-Piraeus in blue, Drama-Kavala-Xanthi in green, and Rhodope-Evros in red

The super-prefectures of Greece (υπερνομαρχίες, sing. υπερνομαρχία) were a second-degree organization of local self-government and an administrative division between the regions and the prefectures. They were each headed by an elected but largely ceremonial super-prefect, with most of the prefectural duties performed by the prefects under the super-prefect. The super-prefectures were:

- Athens-Piraeus super-prefecture (Υπερνομαρχία Αθηνών-Πειραιώς or Νομαρχιακή Αυτοδιοίκηση Αθηνών - Πειραιώς)
- Drama-Kavala-Xanthi Super-prefecture
- Rhodope-Evros Super-prefecture

== See also ==
- Attica Prefecture
