= Rhodope-Evros Super-prefecture =

Rhodope-Evros in red

Rhodope-Evros Super-prefecture was one of the three super-prefectures of Greece. The super-prefecture ceased to exist on 31 December 2010 with the implementation of the Kallikratis Program. It now consists of the Rhodope Prefecture in the west and the Evros Prefecture in the east.

== See also ==
- Western Thrace
- Thrace Prefecture
