= Decentralized Administration of the Aegean =

Top-level regional administrative entity in Greece

- Αποκεντρωμένη Διοίκηση Αιγαίου

Agency overview
- Formed: 1 January 2011
- Jurisdiction: Government of Greece
- Headquarters: Piraeus, Attica; 37°57′N 23°38′E
- Agency executive: Nikos Theodoridis, Acting Secretary-General
- Website: www.apdaigaiou.gov.gr

Map
- Location of the Aegean in Greece

Area served
- Supervised regions: North Aegean, South Aegean
- Regional units: 18
- Municipalities: 43
- Area (land mass): 9,122 km^{2} (3,522 sq mi)
- Population: 508,246 (as of 2011)

The Decentralized Administration of the Aegean (Greek: Αποκεντρωμένη Διοίκηση Αιγαίου) is one of the seven decentralized administrations of Greece, consisting of the regions of North Aegean and South Aegean. Seated in Piraeus, it is currently led by Acting Secretary-General Nikos Theodoridis.

== Formation and tasks ==
Decentralized Administrations were created in January 2011 as part of a far-reaching reform of the country's administrative structure, the Kallikratis reform (Law 3852/2010).

They enjoy both administrative and financial autonomy and exercise devolved state powers in urban planning, environmental and energy policy, forestry, migration and citizenship. Beyond that, they are tasked with supervising the first and second-level self-governing bodies: the municipalities and regions, in this case the 43 municipalities of the Aegean and the two regions themselves.

== Characteristics ==
The Decentralized Administration of the Aegean is seated outside its own territory in Piraeus, Athens. It is however the most decentralized administration with organizational structures all over the Aegean Islands.

Covering a landmass of 9,122 km^{2} (3,522 sq mi), the Aegean is one of the smallest of the seven decentralized administrations by area, and with an overall population of 508,246 also the least populous.

In the European NUTS nomenclature, the two regions of the Aegean together with Crete form the first level NUTS region EL4 (Nisia Aigaiou, Kriti).

== Secretary-General ==
The Decentralized Administration is led by a secretary-general (Γενικός Γραμματέας) who is appointed or dismissed by a Cabinet decision upon request of the Greek Minister of Interior, and is therefore considered the senior representative of the national government in the regions.

Following the electoral victory of Syriza in January 2015, the new minister for the interior, Nikos Voutsis, declared that the decentralized administrations would be abolished, and their powers transferred to the regions. Until this reform is formalized, and as the secretaries-general appointed by the previous administration resigned on 2 February, the decentralized administrations are run by their senior civil servants as acting secretaries-general. The current acting secretary-general is Nikos Theodoridis.

=== List of secretaries-general ===
- Fotis Chatzimichalis (PASOK), January 2011 – August 2012
- Christiana Kalogirou (Nea Dimokratia), August 2012 – April 2014
- Spyros Spyridon (Nea Dimokratia), April 2014 – February 2015
- Nikos Theodoridis (Independent), since February 2015

== Literature ==
- Ministry of Interior (January 2013). "Structure and operation of local and regional democracy". Council of Europe.
