= Prefectures of Greece =

Former administrative division of Greece

Until the Kallikratis reform in 2010, the prefectures (Greek: νομοί [noˈmi], sg. νομός [noˈmos̠]) were the second-level administrative regions of Greece. They are now defunct, and have been approximately replaced by regional units.

They are called departments in ISO 3166-2:GR and by the United Nations Group of Experts on Geographical Names.

The prefectures were the second-degree organization of local government, grouped into 13 regions or (before 1987) 10 geographical departments, and in turn divided into provinces and comprising a number of communities and municipalities. The prefectures became self-governing entities in 1994, when the first prefectural-level elections took place. The prefects were previously appointed by the government. By 2010, their number had risen to 51, of which one, the Attica Prefecture, where more than a third of the country's population resided, was further subdivided into four prefecture-level administrations (νομαρχίες, sing. νομαρχία). In addition, there were three super-prefectures (υπερνομαρχίες, sing. υπερνομαρχία) controlling two or more prefectures.

With the Kallikratis reform, which entered into force on 1 January 2011, the prefectures were abolished. Many, especially in the mainland and in Crete, were retained in the form of regional units (περιφερειακές ενότητες) within the empowered regions, which largely took over the prefectures' administrative role.

== Organization ==
The "Prefectural Self-Governments" were formed in 1994 and replaced the previous prefectures, whose councils and prefects were appointed by the government.

Prefectures were governed by a Prefectural Council (νομαρχιακό συμβούλιο) made up of 21 to 37 members, led by the Prefect (νομάρχης) and presided by a Council President (πρόεδρος).

Other organs of the prefectures were:

- The Prefectural Committee, consisted of the Prefect or an assistant appointed by him and 4 to 6 members, elected by the Prefectural Council.
- The Provincial Council and
- The Eparchos (Sub-prefect/eparch, έπαρχος).

Super-prefectures had their own organs (Council, Committee and Super-prefect).

Prefectural councillors were elected via public election every four years. Three-fifths of all seats went to the combination winning a majority and two-fifths of the seats going to remaining parties based on a proportional system. Prefect became the president of the victorious electoral combination. Victorious is a combination which attains more than 42% in the first round of the prefectural elections. If no combination passes this threshold, a second round takes place between the two combinations that took the most votes in the first round.

== Duties ==
The State ultimately oversaw the actions of local governments, including the prefectures, but the Constitution of Greece and the Code of Prefectural Self-Government still provided communities and municipalities with legal control over the administration of their designated areas.

The Code of Prefectural Self-Government did not include a non-restrictive list of prefectural duties, but a general rule, according to which the newly formed Prefectural Self-Governments had all the duties of the previous prefectures, which are related to their local affairs. Nonetheless, the affairs of "(central) state administration" belonging to the prefects before 1994 are now exerted by the Presidents of the Regions (περιφερειάρχης). The Prefectural Self-Governments kept the "local affairs of prefectureal level" not belonging to the "(central) state administration".

With certain laws specific affairs of certain ministries were transferred to the Prefectural Self-Governments (sanitary committees, urban-planning services etc.).

== List of prefectures ==
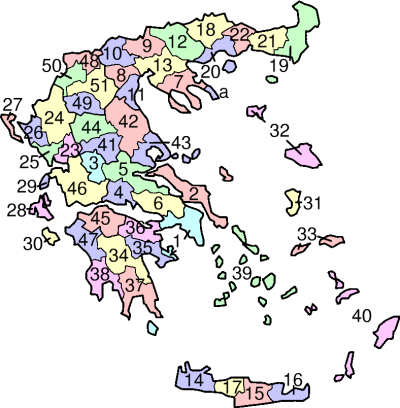
The prefectures of Greece

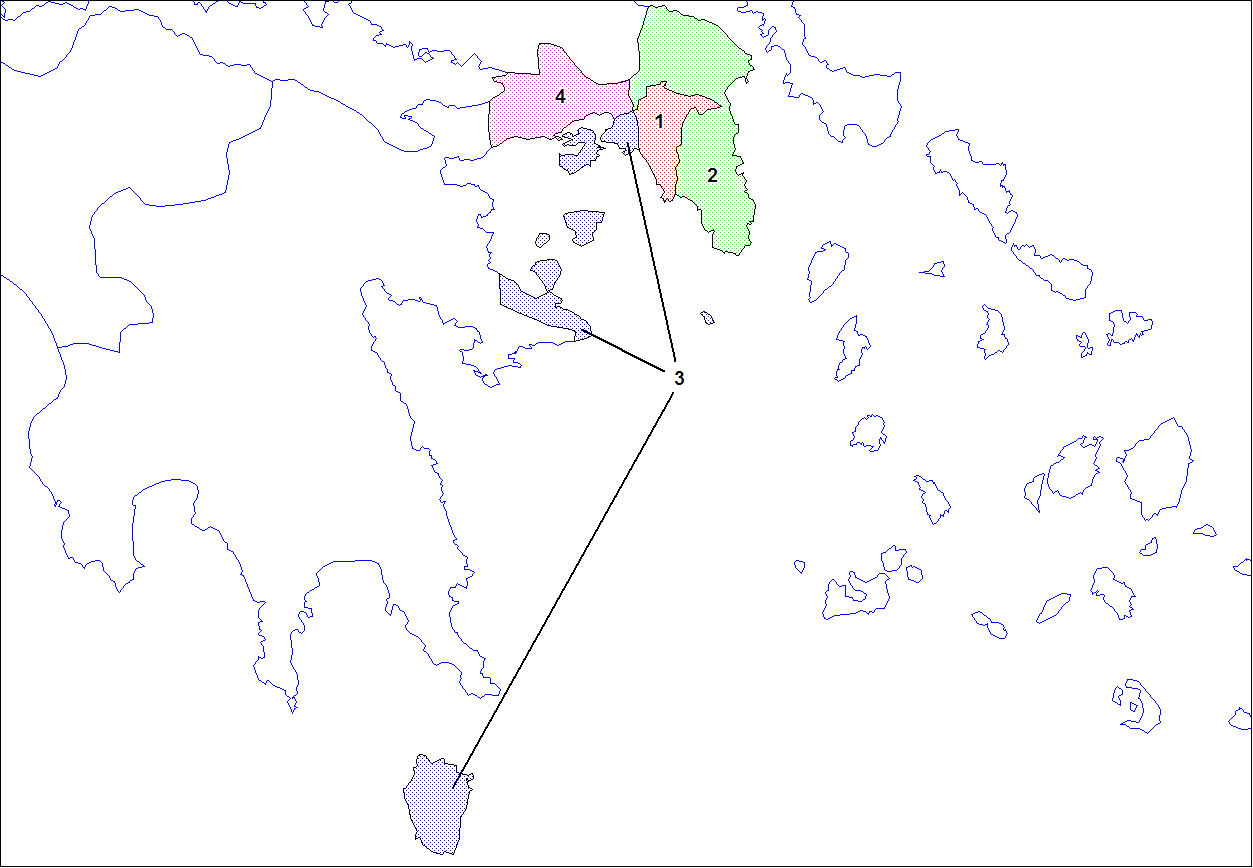
Division of Attica (labelled 1 in the map above): 1 Athens, 2 East Attica, 3 Piraeus, 4 West Attica.

Number in map	Prefecture	Area (km^{2})	Population (2001)	Population density (/km^{2})	Region
46	Aetolia-Acarnania	5460.888	224,429	41.10	Western Greece
42	Larissa	5380.943	279,305	51.91	Thessaly
24	Ioannina	4990.416	170,239	34.11	Epirus
5	Phthiotis	4440.765	178,771	40.26	Central Greece
34	Arcadia	4418.736	102,035	23.09	Peloponnese
19	Evros	4241.615	149,354	35.21	Eastern Macedonia and Thrace
2	Euboea	4167.449	215,136	51.62	Central Greece
12	Serres	3967.744	200,916	50.64	Central Macedonia
13	Thessaloniki	3682.736	1,057,825	287.24	Central Macedonia
37	Laconia	3636.058	99,637	27.40	Peloponnese
51	Kozani	3515.853	155,324	44.18	Western Macedonia
18	Drama	3468.293	103,975	29.98	Eastern Macedonia and Thrace
44	Trikala	3383.477	138,047	40.80	Thessaly
45	Achaea	3271.507	322,789	98.67	Western Greece
38	Messenia	2990.901	176,876	59.14	Peloponnese
6	Boeotia	2951.622	131,085	44.41	Central Greece
7	Chalkidiki	2917.877	104,894	35.95	Central Macedonia
40	Dodecanese	2714.295	190,071	70.03	South Aegean
15	Heraklion	2641.220	292,489	110.74	Crete
43	Magnesia	2636.272	206,995	78.52	Thessaly
41	Karditsa	2635.954	129,541	49.14	Thessaly
47	Elis	2617.776	193,288	73.84	Western Greece
39	Cyclades	2571.691	112,615	43.79	South Aegean
21	Rhodope	2543.145	110,828	43.58	Eastern Macedonia and Thrace
9	Kilkis	2518.880	89,056	35.36	Central Macedonia
10	Pella	2505.774	145,797	58.18	Central Macedonia
14	Chania	2375.849	150,387	63.30	Crete
49	Grevena	2290.856	37,947	16.56	Western Macedonia
36	Corinthia	2289.952	154,624	67.52	Peloponnese
35	Argolis	2154.309	105,770	49.10	Peloponnese
32	Lesbos	2153.727	109,118	50.66	North Aegean
4	Phocis	2120.564	48,284	22.77	Central Greece
20	Kavala	2111.705	144,850	68.59	Eastern Macedonia and Thrace
48	Florina	1924.564	54,768	28.46	Western Macedonia
3	Evrytania	1868.911	32,053	17.15	Central Greece
16	Lasithi	1822.764	76,319	41.87	Crete
22	Xanthi	1792.992	101,856	56.81	Eastern Macedonia and Thrace
50	Kastoria	1720.133	53,483	31.09	Western Macedonia
8	Imathia	1700.810	143,618	84.44	Central Macedonia
23	Arta	1662.210	78,134	47.01	Epirus
11	Pieria	1516.702	129,846	85.61	Central Macedonia
26	Thesprotia	1514.653	46,091	30.43	Epirus
1-2	East Attica	1512.993	403,918	266.97	Attica
17	Rethymno	1496.047	81,936	54.77	Crete
25	Preveza	1035.938	59,356	57.30	Epirus
1-4	West Attica	1004.007	151,612	151.01	Attica
1-3	Piraeus	929.382	541,504	582.65	Attica
28	Cephalonia	904.387	39,488	43.66	Ionian Islands
31	Chios	904.227	53,408	59.06	North Aegean
33	Samos	777.945	43,595	56.04	North Aegean
27	Corfu (Kerkyra)	641.057	111,975	174.67	Ionian Islands
30	Zakynthos	405.550	39,015	96.20	Ionian Islands
1-1	Athens Prefecture	361.719	2,664,776	7,366.98	Attica
29	Lefkada	355.936	22,506	63.23	Ionian Islands
a	Mount Athos	335.637	2,262	6.74	—

== History ==
The following prefectures have been part of the Greek state since independence:

- Attica
- Boeotia
- Phthiotis Prefecture
- Phocis Prefecture
- Evrytania Prefecture
- Euboea Prefecture
- Aetolia-Acarnania Prefecture
- Cyclades Prefecture
- Corinthia Prefecture
- Argolis Prefecture
- Arcadia Prefecture
- Laconia Prefecture
- Messinia Prefecture
- Achaea Prefecture
- Elis

Notes:

1. Many of the prefectures were originally combined in pairs:
  1. Attica and Boeotia formed the Attica and Boeotia Prefecture
  2. Phthiotis Prefecture and Phocis Prefecture formed the Phthiotis and Phocis Prefecture (in 1833–1836 the Phocis and Locris Prefecture)
  3. Corinthia Prefecture and Argolis Prefecture formed Argolis and Corinthia Prefecture
  4. Achaea Prefecture and Elis Prefecture formed the Achaea and Elis Prefecture
2. Aetolia-Acarnania originally also included Evrytania. Unlike the rest mentioned above, the prefecture never broke up into two prefectures, thus being the only one left with a composite appellation.
3. Messenia originally included the southern half of what is now Elis.
4. Laconia originally included the southern-eastern half of what is now Messinia.
5. Euboea originally included the Sporades, which now belong to Magnesia.
6. The territory of Phthiotis Prefecture did not originally include the Domokos Province, which was part of Thessaly (under Ottoman rule until 1881). The area currently constituting the Domokos Province of the Fthiotis Prefecture only became a part of the Greek state in general, and of Phthiotis in particular, after the annexation of Thessaly to Greece in 1881.
7. Arcadia Prefecture and the Cyclades Prefecture are the only prefectures to have their borders unchanged since independence.
8. The capital of Argolis Prefecture, Nafplion was the first capital of the modern Greek state (1828–1834), before the move of the capital to Athens by King Otto.

There were several short-lived prefectures in areas of present Albania and Turkey, during the Greek occupation of those areas during World War I and the Greco-Turkish War (1919–1922) respectively:

- Argyrokastron (1915–1916), in Northern Epirus (southern Albania)
- Korytsa (1915–1916), in Northern Epirus (southern Albania)
- Adrianople (1920–1922), in Eastern Thrace (European Turkey)
- Kallipolis (1920–1922), in Eastern Thrace (European Turkey)
- Rhaedestos (1920–1922), in Eastern Thrace (European Turkey)
- Saranta Ekklisies (1920–1922), in Eastern Thrace (European Turkey)

== See also ==
- ISO 3166-2:GR
