= Drama-Kavala-Xanthi Super-prefecture =

Former subdivision of Greece

Drama-Kavala-Xanthi in green

Drama-Kavala-Xanthi Super-prefecture was one of three super-prefectures of Greece.

It consisted of Drama Prefecture in the northwest, Kavala Prefecture in the centre-south and Xanthi Prefecture in the east.
