= Attica Prefecture =

Coordinates: 38°05′00″N 23°30′00″E

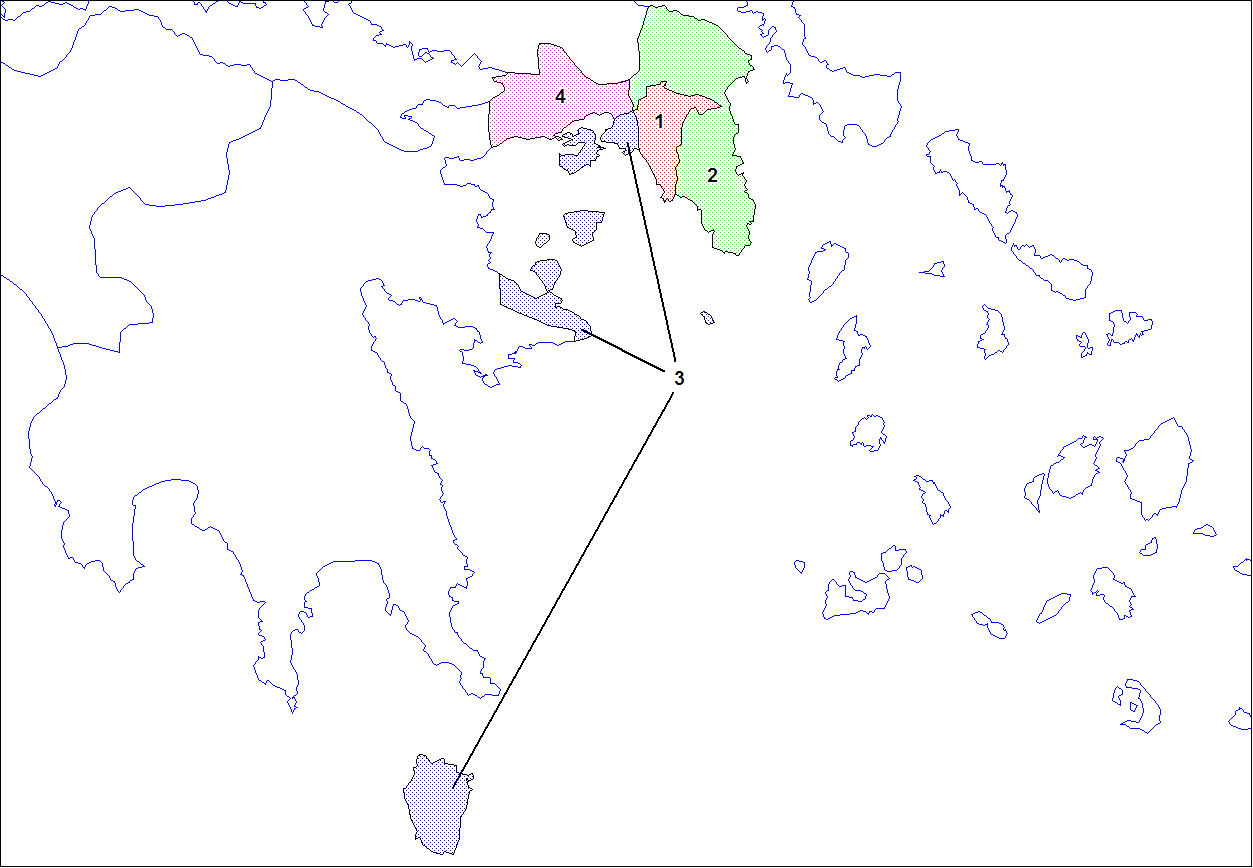
Division of the prefecture of Attica: 1 Athens 2 East Attica 3 Piraeus 4 West Attica

Attica Prefecture (Greek: Νομὸς Ἀττικῆς) was a prefecture of Greece, first established in 1833 and disestablished for the last time in 1987. The prefecture was coextensive with the present-day Attica region.

== History ==
Attica Prefecture was first established in 1833 as Attica and Boeotia Prefecture. Attica and Boeotia Prefecture was abolished in 1836 and split up into separate Attica and Boeotia prefectures, then reconstituted in 1845, and subsequently split up again into separate Attica and Boeotia prefectures in the 1899 reform; the latter reform was reversed in 1909. Attica and Boeotia Prefecture finally ceased to exist in 1943, when it was again split up into Attica and Boeotia (FEK 223Α/26-7-1943).

In 1964 created the newly formed Piraeus Prefecture and after the dissolution of the Prefecture in 1972 was one of the 4 prefectures (Νομαρχίες) of Attica prefecture.

After the 1970s, according to the administrative division of 1971 and subsequent changes, Attica Prefecture consisted of the following prefectural-level administrations (nomarchies):

1. Athens
2. East Attica
3. Piraeus
4. West Attica

It was the only prefecture subdivided like this and in many contexts the sub-units were regarded as prefectures.

Attica Prefecture was administered as part of Central Greece until 1987, when it was established as an administrative region in its own right.

With the 2010 Kallikratis plan, the Attica region's authority were redefined: since 1 January 2011, the region represents the second-level local administration.
