= Decentralized Administration of Attica =

Decentralized administration in Greece

- Αποκεντρωμένη Διοίκηση Αττικής
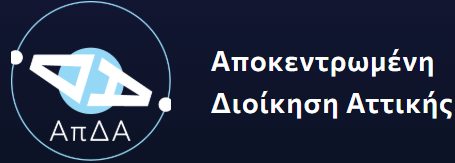

Agency overview
- Formed: 1 January 2011
- Jurisdiction: Government of Greece
- Headquarters: Athens, Attica
- Employees: 698
- Agency executive: Acting Secretary-General
- Website: www.apdattikis.gov.gr

Map
- Location of Attica in Greece

Area served
- Supervised region: Attica
- Regional units: 8
- Municipalities: 66
- Area: 3,808 km^{2} (1,470 sq mi)
- Population: 3,828,434 (as of 2011)

The Decentralized Administration of Attica (Greek: Αποκεντρωμένη Διοίκηση Αττικής) is one of the seven decentralized administrations of Greece, solely consisting of the region of Attica. Its seat is Athens.

== Formation and tasks ==
Decentralized Administrations were created in January 2011 as part of a far-reaching reform of the country's administrative structure, the Kallikratis reform (Law 3852/2010).

They enjoy both administrative and financial autonomy and exercise devolved state powers in urban planning, environmental and energy policy, forestry, migration and citizenship. Beyond that, they are tasked with supervising the first and second-level self-governing bodies: the municipalities and regions, in this case the 66 municipalities of Attica and the region itself.

== Characteristics ==
Covering an area of 3,808 km^{2} (1,470 sq mi), Attica is by far the smallest, but with an overall population of 3,828,434 also by far the most populated of the seven decentralized administrations.

In the European NUTS nomenclature, Attica forms the first level NUTS region EL3 (Attiki).

== General Secretary ==
The Decentralized Administration is led by a Secretary-General (Γενικός Γραμματέας) who is appointed or dismissed by a Cabinet decision upon request of the Greek Minister of Interior, and is therefore considered the senior representative of the national government in the regions.

In January 2014, Manolis Angelakas (Nea Dimokratia), who previously had been responsible for Peloponnese, Western Greece and the Ionian, was appointed Secretary-General. Following the electoral victory of Syriza in January 2015, the new Minister for the Interior, Nikos Voutsis, declared that the decentralized administrations would be abolished, and their powers transferred to the regions. Until this reform is formalized, and as the Secretaries-General appointed by the previous administration resigned on 2 February, the decentralized administrations are run by their senior civil servants as Acting Secretaries-General.

=== List of secretaries-general ===
- Ilias Liakopoulos (PASOK), January 2011 – August 2012
- Dimitris Kalogeropoulos (Nea Dimokratia), August 2012 – January 2014
- Manolis Angelakas (Nea Dimokratia), January 2014 – February 2015

== Literature ==
- Ministry of Interior (January 2013). "Structure and operation of local and regional democracy". Council of Europe.
