= Kallikratis Programme =

Greek administrative reform (2010)

Kallikratis programme

Hellenic Republic
- Long title: New Architecture of Self-governing Entities and Deconcentrated Administration – Kallikratis programme
- Citation: Kallikratis programme (3852/2010) (in Greek). 7 June 2010.
- Territorial extent: Greece
- Enacted by: Hellenic Parliament
- Signed by: President Karolos Papoulias; Prime minister George Papandreou
- Signed: 4 June 2010

Legislative history
- Bill title: 3852/2010
- Introduced by: Government of Greece

Amended by
- Kleisthenis I Programme (2019)

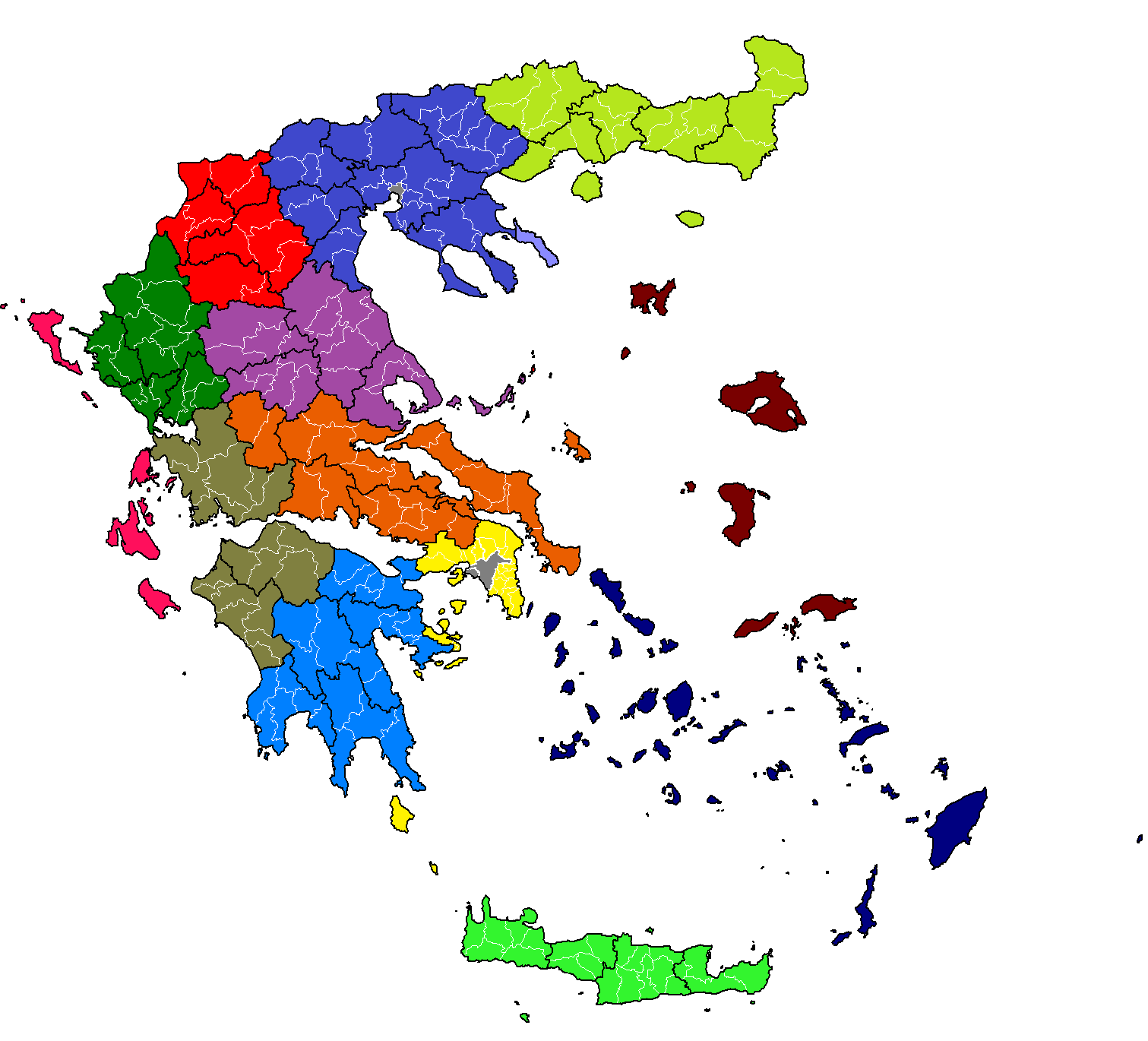
Subdivisions of Greece after the 2010 Kallikratis reform.

The Kallikratis Programme (Greek: Πρόγραμμα Καλλικράτης, romanized: Prógramma Kallikrátis) is the common name of Greek law 3852/2010 of 2010, a major administrative reform in Greece. It brought about the second major reform of the country's administrative divisions following the 1997 Kapodistrias reform.

Named after ancient Greek architect Callicrates, the programme was presented by the socialist Papandreou cabinet and was adopted by the Hellenic Parliament in May 2010. The programme's implementation started with the November 2010 local elections, and was completed by January 2011. It was amended by the Kleisthenis I Programme (Law 4555/2018), which was adopted in July 2018 and implemented in September 2019.

== History ==
=== Administrative reforms in the 1990s ===
1994 reforms under the socialist Papandreou government turned the largely dysfunctional prefectures into Prefectural Self-Government entities (PSGs) with prefects and prefectural councils both being popularly elected. In return, the thirteen administrative regions of Greece, which had already been created in 1987, but in the absence of a working budget remained unable to fulfill even their limited responsibilities, now assumed the prefectures' competences in regard to tax collection, European structural funding and treasury.

Part of the subsequent Kapodistrias plan, Law 2539/1997 sharply reduced the number of municipalities and communities from 5.823 to 1.033, after the increasing urbanization had left small communities literally dying out. With a median of just 4,661.5 inhabitants, a large number of small municipalities and rural communities however remained independent. This included 88 communities with a population of less than 1000, down to Gramos with just 28 inhabitants.

With the territorial reforms of the 1990s, Greece has been cited as the first southern European country to follow a coercive top-down approach for territorial reforms, an approach rather typical for northern European countries. Though strengthened by the 1990s reforms, the prefectural second-tier level however did not meet expectations. Largely subverted by an uncoordinated but convergent anti-reform opposition, the reformed prefectures lost a number of important competences following court decisions. The numerous controversies largely undermined public trust in the prefectural level.

=== The failed Kapodistrias II ===
After the electoral victory of the liberal-conservative New Democracy party in 2004, the Karamanlis government had initially been reluctant to pursue further administrative reforms, as it had opposed the reforms of the 1990s. In a late implementation of a provision that was already part of the Kapodistrias plan, the 147 provinces, as subunits of the 51 prefectures, were abolished in 2007.

Only after the 2007 reelection did the Karamanlis government decide that further reforms were necessary to bring the territorial structure in line with the European Union's Lisbon Strategy and the requirements of the Fourth Programming Period (2007–2013). The thirteen regions were planned to be combined to just six major "programmatic supra-regions" that were expected to more successfully compete for European structural funding. Municipalities would be amalgamated from 1034 down to 400, and prefectural governments reduced from 50 down to 16, in order to overcome fragmentation, to facilitate fiscal control by the state, and to create economies of scale.

Putting administrative efficiency first, the top-down reform plan was criticized as subordinating questions of legitimacy and participation. Rather than being opposed by the parliamentary opposition, the plan faced obstruction by the more conservative camp within the governing party and ultimately failed.

=== Kallikratis: New attempt at administrative reform ===
Following the landslide victory of the socialist PASOK in the early 2009 legislative election, a new attempt at further administrative reforms was started. The Kallikratis plan was presented to the public in January 2010, amidst the beginnings of the Greek financial crisis. While in terms of figures rather similar to the failed New Democracy plans, it was not confined to reducing the sheer number of administrative entities and their state accountability. In a country which has been widely regarded as the most centralist country of the European Union, with many smaller municipalities, especially rural communities being "extremely understaffed and deprived of any possibility to fulfil their tasks," an emphasis was put on strengthening the remaining authorities in terms of autonomy of self-governance, public transparency and overall accessibility to citizens. At the same time, the programme aimed at reducing local government employees by 50%, from around 50.000 to 25.000 across the country.

The law was adopted in May 2010 and was implemented following the November 2010 local elections comprising the constituting regional elections, which replaced provincial elections as they were held before in 2002 and 2006.

== Reforms as part of the Kallikratis plan ==
Comparison chart
	Former (Kapodistrias, 1998–2010)	New (Kallikratis, 2011)
decentralized agencies of national administration	13 administrative districts ("administrative regions", Διοικητική περιφέρεια, Diikitiki periferia)	7 administrative districts ("decentralized administrations", Αποκεντρωμένη Διοίκηση, Apokendromeni Diikisi) headed by a general secretary appointed by the Minister of Interior.
secondary, regional-level self-governing entities	51 prefectures (Νομοί, Nomi) or "nomes", headed by a popularly elected Prefect (Νομάρχης) and governed by the popularly elected Prefectural Council (Νομαρχιακό συμβούλιο). Some prefectures were grouped into larger administrative super-prefectures or "hypernomarchies"), while Attica Prefecture was further subdivided into four administrative prefectures ("nomarchies").	13 regions (Περιφέρεια, Periferia) or "peripheries", headed by a popularly elected Governor (περιφερειάρχης, periferiarchis) and governed by the popularly elected Regional Council (Περιφερειακό συμβούλιο, perifereiakó symvoúlio). Regions are further subdivided into regional units (περιφερειακή ενότητα, periferiaki enotita), often corresponding to the former prefectures, and headed by a vice-regional governor (αντιπεριφερειάρχης, antiperifereiárchis).
primary, local-level self-governing entities	914 municipalities (Δήμος, Dimos), further subdivided in: municipal districts (Δημοτικό διαμέρισμα) or; local districts (Τοπικό διαμέρισμα); 120 communities (Κοινότητα, kinotita)	325 municipalities (Δήμος, Dimos), further divided in: municipal units (Δημοτική ενότητα); municipal communities (Δημοτική κοινότητα); local communities (Τοπική κοινότητα)

=== Local administrative reform ===
Distribution of municipalities by orders of magnitude
Population	Municipalities			
Population	Before 2010		After 2011	
Population	Number	Share	Number	Share
up to 5,000	548	53%	45	14%
up to 10,000	259	25%	28	8%
up to 50,000	186	18%	192	59%
up to 100,000	31	3%	49	15%
> 100,000	10	1%	13	4%
Total	1034	100%	325	100%

The Kallikratis Programme further reduced the number of self-governing local administrative units by compulsory merging the 1033 municipalities and communities which the Kapodistrias reform had already amalgamated to just 325 municipalities. Amalgamation of communities led to a number of pre-2007 provinces being reinstated as municipalities. Altogether, Greek municipalities now reached a mean size of 31,000 inhabitants, a level comparable to many other countries in the European Union.

To improve public transparency, local authorities are now generally obliged to make public all their decisions via the internet. Furthermore, a Local Ombudsman was established to support both citizens and enterprises in coping with local administrations. New Financial Committees and Executive Committees were established to help professionalize financial accounting, and to monitor the local administrations. In communities with more than 10,000 residents, a Committee for the quality of life and a Consultation Committee is established. Aimed at improving local allocation of municipal resources, the Consultation Committee consists of representatives of local stakeholders such as businesses, trade unions, chambers and NGOs.

The issuance of building permits is assigned to the municipalities (paragraph 1 of article 94 of the law 3852/2010 ).

=== Regional administrative reform ===
At the same time the programme abolished the 51 self-governing prefectures (NUTS 3), leaving them only in place as regional units. The former prefectures' competences were transferred to the 13 NUTS 2-level administrative regions (Διοικητική περιφέρεια, Diikitiki periferia or "administrative region"). Originally introduced in 1987, the regions had been strengthened in 1993 as intermediate administrative units for regional planning. Under the Kallikratis Programme, these regions became self-governing, separate entities with a regional council and a regional governor, both popularly elected.

In return, the central tasks of the national administration were transferred to seven larger, newly created "decentralized administrations" (Αποκεντρωμένη Διοίκηση, Apokendromeni Diikisi). Headed by a general secretary appointed by the Minister of Interior, the decentralized administration is responsible for regional planning and environmental protection.

Subsequently, from 2010 on, subnational elections were held at the regional rather than the prefectural level, and from 2014 on, they are held together with the European Parliament elections for a five-year period.

Overview: post-Kallikratis subnational entities
Decentralized administrations	Regions	Number of municipalities
Macedonia–Thrace	Central Macedonia	22
Macedonia–Thrace	Eastern Macedonia and Thrace	38
Epirus–Western Macedonia	Western Macedonia	12
Epirus–Western Macedonia	Epirus	19
Thessaly–Central Greece	Thessaly	25
Thessaly–Central Greece	Central Greece	25
Peloponnese–Western Greece–Ionian Islands	Peloponnese	26
Peloponnese–Western Greece–Ionian Islands	Western Greece	19
Peloponnese–Western Greece–Ionian Islands	Ionian Islands	7
Attica	Attica	66
Aegean	North Aegean	8
Aegean	South Aegean	34
Crete	Crete	24

== Reactions ==
=== Scholarly assessments ===
Scholars of Southern European studies have described the Kallikratis reform as surprising, as it abolished a great number of prestigious and powerful political posts, which ahead of the looming crisis would have been regarded indispensable for keeping party clientelism alive. Bertrana and Heinelt described the Papandreou government's decision as using a singular window of opportunity to overcome long-standing resistance against reform. While in regard to the massive-scale top-down approach deviating from a Southern European strategy, compared to federal states such as Germany, interaction between national and subnational levels remains relatively weak with the subnational levels remaining strictly separated from the deconcentrated administration of the central government. Also, state supervision remains largely confined to a posteriori control of the legality of a subnational entity's activity.

Howard Elcock suggested that in spite of all efforts, officialdom's reluctance makes securing transparency a continuing struggle, so the Greek citizen remained an administré rather than a participant in government. Unnecessary decimation of local community organization led, on several occasions, to further minimization of participation. In the meantime, the hasty manner through which the law came into action paralyzed local authorities' initiative and independent funding.

=== Kallikratis and austerity ===
Akrivopoulou et al. pointed out that the Kallikratis program needs to be seen in the context of the general effort to create a smaller state. They point to specific provisions in the First and even more so in the Second Memorandum concerning the role of local governance for overall austerity.

Nicos Souliotis pointed out that the Kallikratis plan fosters the transfer of austerity policies to the local administrations, as the devolution of responsibilities to the subnational levels has not been accompanied by the transfer of the financial resources required to fulfil the responsibilities.

== See also ==
- List of municipalities and communities in Greece (1997–2010)
- Administrative divisions of Greece
