= Kapodistrias reform =

Greek administrative division reform

Kapodistrias reform (Greek: Σχέδιο Καποδίστριας, "Kapodistrias Plan") is the common name of law 2539 of Greece, which reorganised the country's administrative divisions. The law, named after 19th-century Greek statesman (Ioannis Kapodistrias), passed the Hellenic Parliament in 1997, and was implemented in 1998. The administrative system was changed again at the 2010 Kallikratis reform.

== Municipalities and communities ==
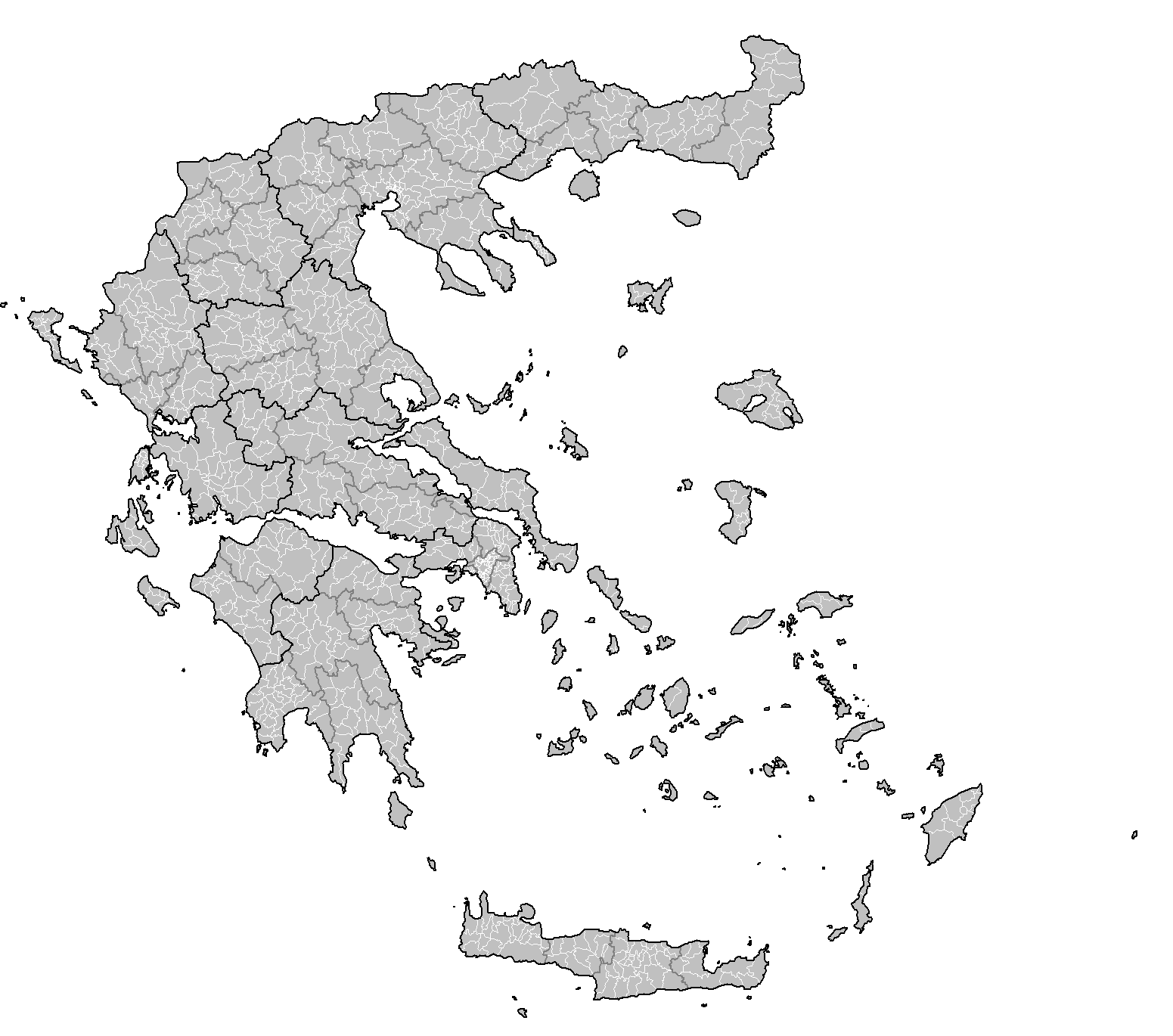
Municipalities and communities of Greece after the Kapodistrias reform

Before and after the Kapodistrias reform, the difference between municipalities (δήμοι) and communities (κοινότητες) was merely a matter of size. Municipalities were larger and had a more urban character than communities, which were as small as a single village. The reform reduced the number of municipalities and communities sharply: from 5775 (441 municipalities and 5382 communities) to 1033 (900 municipalities and 133 communities).

Municipalities and communities varied in population from 745,514 (Athens) to 28 (Gramos, in Kastoria Prefecture) with an average of 10,603.5 and a median of only 4,661.5 (2001 census "real" population, including Agion Oros as one of the municipalities). The following table illustrates the range:

Population	Number of municipalities and communities
Less than 1,000	88
1,001 to 5,000	458
5,001 to 10,000	260
10,001 to 50,000	184
50,001 to 100,000	36
More than 100,000	8

Municipalities and communities varied in land area from 873.552 km^{2} (Kato Nevrokopi in Drama Prefecture) to 0.800 km^{2} (Nea Chalkidona in Athens Prefecture), with an average of 127.618 km^{2} and a median of 105.669 km^{2}.

== See also ==
- List of municipalities and communities in Greece (1997–2010)
- Administrative divisions of Greece
