= Municipalities and communities of Greece =

Lowest level of government of Greece

The municipalities of Greece (Greek: δήμοι, romanized: dímoi [ˈðimi], in singular case Greek: δήμος, romanized: dímos) are the lowest level of government within the organizational structure of the state. As of 2021, there are 332 municipalities, further divided into 1036 municipal units and 6136 communities. The new municipalities may be subdivided into municipal units (δημοτικές ενότητες, dimotikés enótites), consisting of the pre-Kallikratis municipalities. These were further subdivided into municipal communities (δημοτικές κοινότητες, dimotikés koinótites) and local communities (τοπικές κοινότητες, topikés koinótites) according to population, but are simply named communities (κοινότητες, koinótites) since the entry into force of the Kleisthenis I Programme on 1 September 2019.

Municipal units and communities do not have legal personality and are not self-governing entities. Municipal units function as electoral districts for their municipalities, but their territories have no associated councils of their own. Communities have popularly elected councils which their respective municipalities are obligated to fund, but these councils are only advisory in nature.

== Constitutional provisions for communities and municipalities ==
Article 102 of the Greek constitution outlines the mandate of municipalities and communities and their relationship to the larger State:

- Municipalities and communities exercise administration of local affairs independently.
- Leadership of municipalities and communities is elected by universal and secret ballot.
- Municipalities may voluntarily or be mandated by law to work together to provide certain services, but elected representatives from the participating groups govern these partnerships.
- The national Greek government supervises local government agencies, but is not to interfere in any local initiatives or actions.
- The State is required to provide funds necessary to fulfill the mandate of local government agencies.

== Organization of communities and municipalities ==
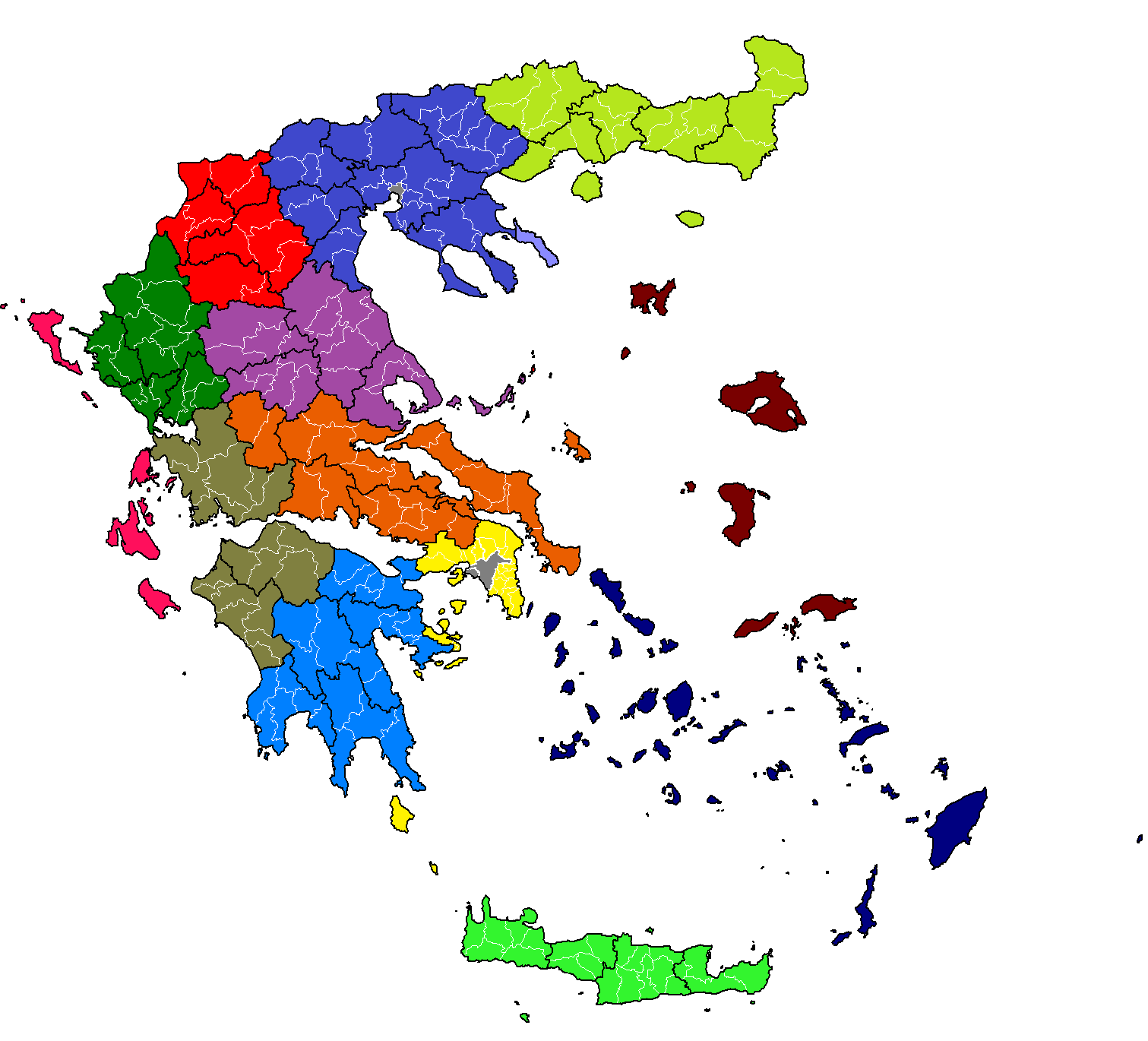
Administrative division of Greece following the "Kallikratis" reform: each colour denotes a region, regional units are outlined in black, and municipalities in white

Municipalities have an elected municipal council (δημοτικό συμβούλιο, dimotikó symvoúlio) and municipal consultation committee (δημοτική επιτροπή διαβούλευσης, dimotikí epitropí diavoúlefsis), led by a mayor (δήμαρχος, dímarchos). Depending on the size of the municipality, municipal councils are made up of anywhere from 13 to 43 council members apportioned across the municipal units. In addition, the council elects 2 to 8 municipal committee member for a term of two years.

Council members are elected via public election every four years on the basis of a party system. Three-fifths of all seats go to the party winning a plurality of the vote and the remaining two-fifths of the seats go to other parties based on their share of the vote on a proportional basis.

Communities have an elected community council (συμβούλιο, symvoúlio) made up of 5 to 15 members and led by a president (πρόεδρος κοινότητας, próedros koinótitas). A deputy chairperson from a communal quarter (if the community has been further divided) may also take part in council meetings when specific issues of a communal interest are being discussed.

The State ultimately oversees the actions of local governments, but the Municipal and Communal Code still provides communities and municipalities with legal control over the administration of their designated areas.

== Participation of citizens in local decision-making ==
Citizens have very few opportunities for direct participation in decision-making outside the elections held every four years. Beyond national referendums that may be called for critical issues, citizens cannot request local referendums. The only other possibility for direct input by citizens is if the local municipality establishes district councils or if the community president calls a people's assembly to discuss issues of concern. The organization of these public opportunities, however, is solely at the discretion of the community or municipal leadership.

== Responsibilities of municipal governments ==
The Municipal and Communal Code (art. 24) states that municipalities and communities have responsibility for the administration of their local jurisdiction as it pertains to the social, financial, cultural and spiritual interests of its citizens. More specifically, communities and municipalities have responsibility for the following:

- Security and police
- Fire fighting
- Civil protection
- Nurseries and kindergartens
- Repair and maintenance of all schools, including the issuing of permits
- Adult education
- Hospitals and health departments
- Family and youth services
- Rest homes
- Public housing and town planning
- Water and waste treatment
- Cemeteries
- Environmental protection
- Theatres, museums, libraries
- Parks, sports and leisure facilities
- Urban road systems
- Gas supplies
- Irrigation
- Farming and fishing
- Commerce and tourism
- Licensing certain business enterprises

== Local government finances ==
Revenues come from both ordinary and extraordinary sources.

Ordinary revenue is derived from the State budget, property revenues, and established taxes and fees. By law, the State funds first level governments on the basis of a fixed formula: 20% of legal persons’ income tax, 50% of traffic duties and 3% of property transfer duties. For smaller populated communities and municipalities, the State has also allocated additional revenue based on other expenses (e.g. the cost of supplying water, maintaining road networks, and climate). Local governments are required to direct any property or resource fees to related expenses (e.g. drinking water fees must go towards the maintenance and improvement of the water system). Other forms of taxation or fines (e.g. parking fees) can be used wherever the government deems necessary.

Extraordinary revenue originates from sources like loans, inheritances, auctions, rents and fines.

Income generation is not limited to traditional service sources. Local governments can also initiate or participate in entrepreneurial activities that include a wide range of possible partnerships.

Each year communities and municipalities formulate their budgets in terms of expected revenues and expenses. Financial management and auditing is then based on this plan.

== History of community and municipal governments ==
- In 1831, the first governor of independent Greece, Ioannis Kapodistrias administratively reorganized the Peloponnese into seven departments and the islands into six. These departments were then subdivided into provinces and, in turn, into towns and villages. Opponents of these reforms later assassinated Kapodistrias.
- The Constitution of 1952 (article 99) clearly identified the administrative role of municipal and community authorities.
- The Constitution of the Hellenic Republic was established in 1975 and in article 102 stated that the first level of government were those of communities and municipalities.
- Law 1416 was passed in 1984 to reinforce municipal authority over local government.
- In 1986, the Constitution was modified with the addition of articles 101 and 102 that established local government parameters and relationships.
- Presidential Decree 410 (Municipal and Communal Code) codified the legislation concerning municipalities and communities in 1995.
- Law 2539 in 1997, named "Ioannis Kapodistrias," took 441 municipalities and the 5382 communities and merged them into 900 municipalities and 133 communities. Newly merged municipalities and communities could further subdivide their territory into municipal or communal departments to give some local authority to merged areas.
- Law 2647 in 1998 transferred responsibilities from the State to local authorities.
- Law 3852 in 2010, named "Kallikratis," took the 900 municipalities and the 133 communities and merged them into 325 municipalities. The new municipalities can subdivide their territory into municipal or local communities.

== See also ==
- List of municipalities of Greece (2011)
- Administrative divisions of Greece
