= Regions of Greece =

Second-level administrative entities of Greece

Regions of Greece Περιφέρειες της Ελλάδας (Greek)
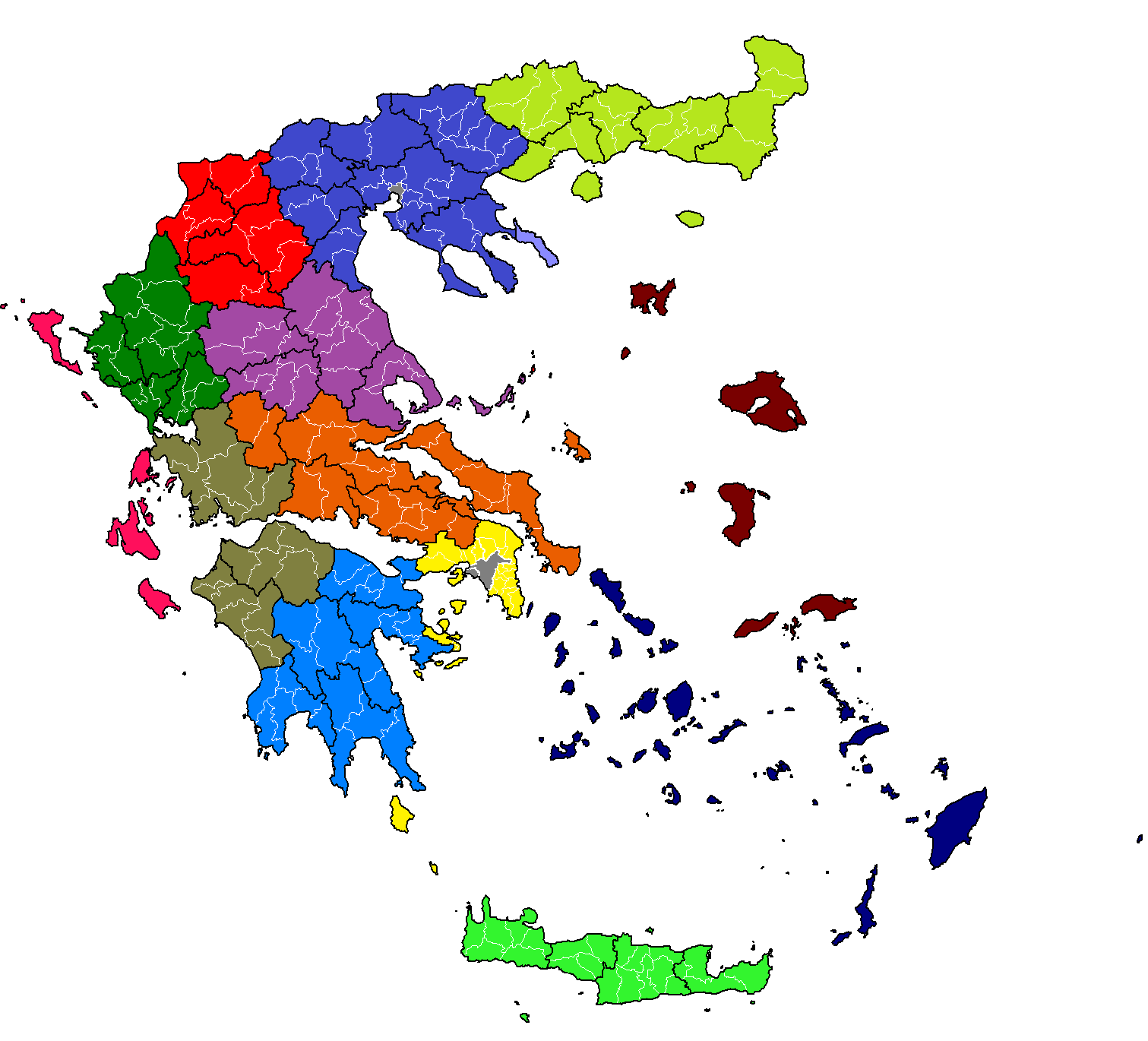
- Category: Unitary state
- Location: Hellenic Republic
- Number: 13 Regions; 1 Autonomous Region
- Populations: 200,642 (Ionian Islands) – 3,784,565 (Attica)
- Areas: 2,307 km^{2} (891 sq mi) (Ionian Islands) – 18,810 km^{2} (7,260 sq mi) (Central Macedonia)
- Government: Central government Regional governments Monastic government (Athos)
- Subdivisions: Regional units

The regions of Greece (Greek: περιφέρειες, romanized: periféreies) are the country's thirteen second-level administrative entities, counting decentralized administrations of Greece as first-level. Regions are divided into regional units, known as prefectures until 2011.

== History ==
The current regions were established in July 1986 (the presidential decree officially establishing them was signed in 1987), by decision of the interior minister, Menios Koutsogiorgas, as second-level administrative entities, complementing the prefectures (Law 1622/1986). Before 1986, there was a traditional division into broad historical–geographical regions (γεωγραφικά διαμερίσματα), which, however, was often arbitrary; not all of the pre-1986 traditional historical-geographic regions had official administrative bodies. Although the post-1986 regions were mostly based on the earlier divisions, they are usually smaller and, in a few cases, do not overlap with the traditional definitions: for instance, the region of Western Greece, which had no previous analogue, comprises territory belonging to the Peloponnese peninsula and the traditional region of Central Greece.

As part of a decentralization process inspired by Interior Minister Alekos Papadopoulos, they were accorded more powers in the 1997 Kapodistrias reform of local and regional government. They were transformed into fully separate entities by the 2010 Kallikratis Plan (Law 3852/2010), which entered into effect on 1 January 2011. In the 2011 changes, the government-appointed general secretary (γενικός γραμματέας) was replaced with a popularly elected regional governor (περιφερειάρχης) and a regional council (περιφερειακό συμβούλιο) with five-year terms. Many powers of the prefectures, which were also abolished or reformed into regional units, were transferred to the region level. The regional organs of the central government were in turn replaced by seven decentralized administrations, which group from one to three regions under a government-appointed general secretary.

== List of regions ==
alt=Map showing modern regions of Greece	1. Attica / Αττική; 2. Central Greece / Στερεά Ελλάδα; 3. Central Macedonia / Κεντρική Μακεδονία; 4. Crete / Κρήτη; 5. Eastern Macedonia and Thrace / Ανατολική Μακεδονία και Θράκη; 6. Epirus / Ήπειρος; 7. Ionian Islands / Ιόνια νησιά 8. North Aegean / Βόρειο Αιγαίο; 9. Peloponnese / Πελοπόννησος; 10. South Aegean / Νότιο Αιγαίο; 11. Thessaly / Θεσσαλία; 12. Western Greece / Δυτική Ελλάδα; 13. Western Macedonia / Δυτική Μακεδονία; 14. Mount Athos / Άγιον Όρος
Map showing modern regions of Greece	1. Attica / Αττική; 2. Central Greece / Στερεά Ελλάδα; 3. Central Macedonia / Κεντρική Μακεδονία; 4. Crete / Κρήτη; 5. Eastern Macedonia and Thrace / Ανατολική Μακεδονία και Θράκη; 6. Epirus / Ήπειρος; 7. Ionian Islands / Ιόνια νησιά 8. North Aegean / Βόρειο Αιγαίο; 9. Peloponnese / Πελοπόννησος; 10. South Aegean / Νότιο Αιγαίο; 11. Thessaly / Θεσσαλία; 12. Western Greece / Δυτική Ελλάδα; 13. Western Macedonia / Δυτική Μακεδονία; 14. Mount Athos / Άγιον Όρος

Bordering the region of Central Macedonia there is one autonomous region, Mount Athos (Agion Oros, or "Holy Mountain"), an autonomous monastic community under Greek sovereignty. It is located on the easternmost of the three large peninsulas protruding into the Aegean from the Chalkidiki peninsula.

	Region	Seat	Area (km^{2})	Governor (1 January 2024 – 31 December 2028)	Population (2024)	Population density (residents/km^{2})	GDP (million €)	GDP per capita (€)
1	Attica	Athens	3,808	Nikos Hardalias (ND)	3,784,565	993.85	97,030	25,638
2	Central Greece	Lamia	15,549	Fanis Spanos (ND)	505,073	32.48	11,475	22,719
3	Central Macedonia	Thessaloniki	18,811	Nana Aidona (ND)	1,778,896	94.57	28,418	15,975
4	Crete	Heraklion	8,336	Stavros Arnaoutakis (PASOK–KINAL)	622,491	74.68	10,331	16,596
5	Eastern Macedonia and Thrace	Komotini	14,157	Christodoulos Topsidis (Independent)	561,834	39.69	8,117	14,447
6	Epirus	Ioannina	9,203	Alexandros Kahrimanis (ND)	321,108	34.89	4,432	13,802
7	Ionian Islands	Corfu	2,307	Giannis Trepeklis (Independent)	200,642	86.97	3,343	16,662
8	North Aegean	Mytilene	3,836	Kostas Moutzouris (Independent)	201,007	52.40	2,704	13,452
9	Peloponnese	Tripoli	15,490	Dimitris Ptochos (ND)	531,598	34.32	9,729	18,301
10	South Aegean	Ermoupoli	5,286	George Hatzimarkos (ND)	327,246	61.91	6,737	20,587
11	Thessaly	Larissa	14,037	Dimitris Kouretas (PASOK–KINAL)	678,747	48.35	10,661	15,707
12	Western Greece	Patras	11,350	Nektarios Farmakis (ND)	640,243	56.41	9,093	14,202
13	Western Macedonia	Kozani	9,451	Giorgos Amanatidis (ND)	247,270	26.16	4,552	18,409
(14)	Mount Athos	Karyes	336	Alkiviadis Stefanis	1,746	5.20	—	—

== See also ==
- Administrative divisions of Greece
- ISO 3166-2:GR
- List of Greek regions by Human Development Index
- Regions of Greece: Maps and Easy Overview of All Regions in Greece
