= List of settlements in Evrytania =

This is a list of settlements in Evrytania, Greece.

- Agia Triada
- Agia Vlacherna
- Agios Andreas
- Agios Charalampos
- Agios Dimitrios
- Agios Nikolaos
- Agrafa
- Alestia
- Ampliani
- Anatoliki Fragkista
- Aniada
- Aspropyrgos
- Chelidona
- Chochlia
- Chryso
- Dafni
- Dermati
- Domianoi
- Domnista
- Dytiki Fragkista
- Epiniana
- Episkopi
- Esochoria
- Fidakia
- Fourna
- Granitsa
- Kalesmeno
- Karitsa
- Karpenisi
- Kastania
- Katavothra
- Kedra
- Kerasochori
- Klafsi
- Kleisto
- Koryschades
- Krikello
- Lepiana
- Limeri
- Lithochori
- Marathia
- Marathos
- Mavrommata
- Megalo Chorio
- Mesokomi
- Mikro Chorio
- Monastiraki
- Mouzilo
- Myriki
- Neo Argyri
- Nostimo
- Palaiochori
- Palaiokatouna
- Papparousi
- Pavlopoulo
- Petralona
- Prasia
- Prodromos
- Prousos
- Psiana
- Raptopoulo
- Roska
- Sarkini
- Sella
- Sivista
- Stavloi
- Stavrochori
- Stefani
- Stenoma
- Sygkrellos
- Topoliana
- Tornos
- Tridendro
- Tripotamo
- Trovato
- Valaora
- Velota
- Viniani
- Voulpi
- Voutyro
- Vracha
- Vrangiana
