= Vrangiana =

Vrangiana may refer to the following places in Greece:

- Vrangiana, Karditsa (Greek: Βραγκιανά Καρδίτσας) or Mikra Vrangiana (Greek: Μικρά Βραγκιανά), a village in Acheloos, Karditsa (regional unit)
- Vrangiana, Evrytania (Greek: Βραγγιανά Ευρυτανίας) or Megala Vrangiana (Greek: Μεγάλα Βραγγιανά), a village in Agrafa, Evrytania
