= Kostas Tsigaridis =

Greek lawyer and politician

Kostas Tsigaridas (Greek: Κωνσταντίνος Τσιγαρίδας, born in Agrafa, 1939) was a Greek lawyer and politician.

== Biography ==
He was born in 1939 in Agrafa. He studied law in the Aristotle University of Thessaloniki. He was member of parliament of Evrytania with PASOK from 1981 to 1989, and served as deputy minister of Agriculture from February 1987 until 1989.
