= Marathia =

Marathia or Marathea (Greek: Μαραθιά or Μαραθέα) may refer to the following places in Greece:

- Marathia, Evrytania, a village in the western part of Evrytania
- Marathea, Elis, a village of Amaliada in Elis
- Marathea, Karditsa, a village in the northern part of the Karditsa regional unit
