= Plastiras Dam =

Plastiras Dam Φράγμα Πλαστήρα
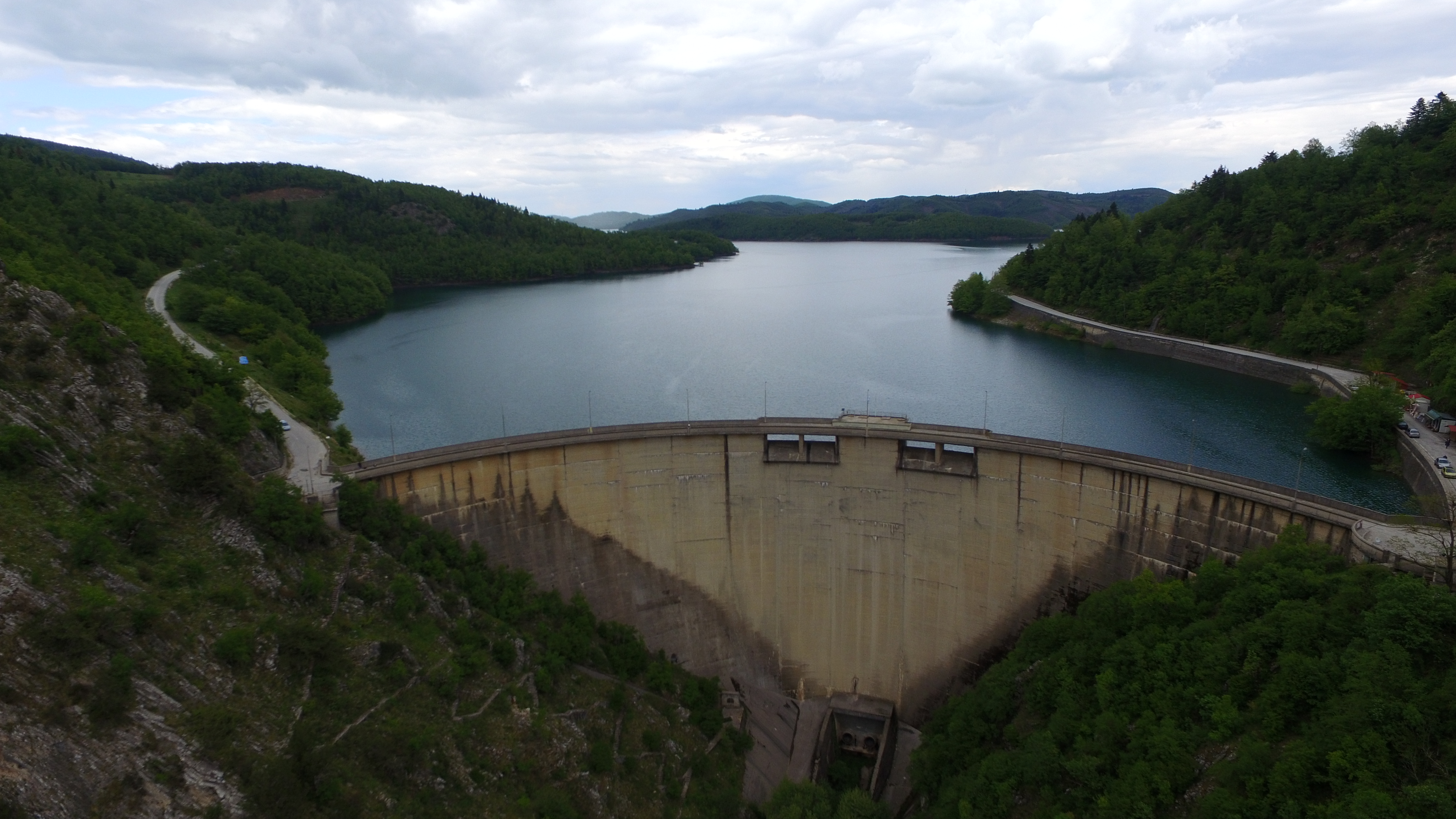
- Plastiras Dam

- Location within Greece
- Country: Greece
- Coordinates: 39°14′08″N 21°44′47″E
- Construction began: December 14, 1955
- Opening date: October 30, 1960

Dam and spillways
- Type of dam: Concrete arch
- Impounds: Tavropos (Megdovas)
- Height: 83 m (272 ft)
- Width (crest): 220 m (720 ft)

Reservoir
- Creates: Lake Plastiras
- Total capacity: 400,000,000 m^{3} (320,000 acre⋅ft)

Power Station
- Operator: Public Power Corporation of Greece
- Turbines: 3 x 43.3 MW Pelton-type
- Installed capacity: 130 MW (max. planned)

The Plastiras Dam (Greek: Φράγμα Πλαστήρα) is a concrete arch dam in Karditsa regional unit, Greece that impounds the Tavropos (Megdovas) River, creating an artificial lake called Lake Plastiras.

== Name ==
The dam is named after Nikolaos Plastiras, a Greek general and politician who was the first to visualize the construction of a reservoir in the Agrafa area as early as 1925. He later boosted the efforts while serving as Prime Minister, but did not live to see the construction of the dam.

== Background ==
The river Tavropos was known in the area for causing flooding frequently. In the late 1920s, the idea of "constraining" the river flow was adopted by the incumbent Minister for Agriculture, but was met with opposition by both his political rivals and locals. Some of the concerns were the overall cost of the building and the impact a reservoir would have on the landscape. After the Second World War, the idea was revived by Prime Minister Nikolaos Plastiras and was also adopted by the Power Corporation. The Power Corporation included the construction of a dam in the area in its effort to electrify the country. Numerous studies on the project were presented and in 1953 the French Omniun Lyonnais won the international contest for the construction of the Dam.

== Construction and specifications ==
The building was officially begun on December 14, 1955, and the construction lasted for five years. The dam was completed on October 30, 1960. Plastiras Dam is known as a "Double arched dam" and it is made of concrete. It is unique in Greece and blocks a narrow point known as Kakavakia. The dam is elevated 795 m (2,608 ft) from sea level. It stands 83 m (272 ft) high and has a crest width of 220 m (720 ft). Its overall volume is 100×103 m³.

== Local impact ==
The dam and the formed reservoir protect both the mountainous region of East Agrafa and the Plains of Karditsa from flooding. As a reservoir it provides irrigation water to the area and is also used to supply fresh water to the city of Karditsa and the surrounding villages. Moreover, the dam is equipped with two hydroelectric turbines that have a capacity of 130MW. Despite the original fears, the formation of the artificial lake is believed to be one of the few cases where the landscape was actually improved. The lake itself is a tourist attraction in Greece. The local economy has been improved since the 1980s due to visitors, and many of the abandoned villages in the area have been revived.

The benefits of the lake as a tourist attraction are so significant that the authorities have decided to limit the use of the reservoir for irrigation and electricity production.

== See also ==
- Energy in Greece
- Renewable energy in Greece
