= Megdovas =

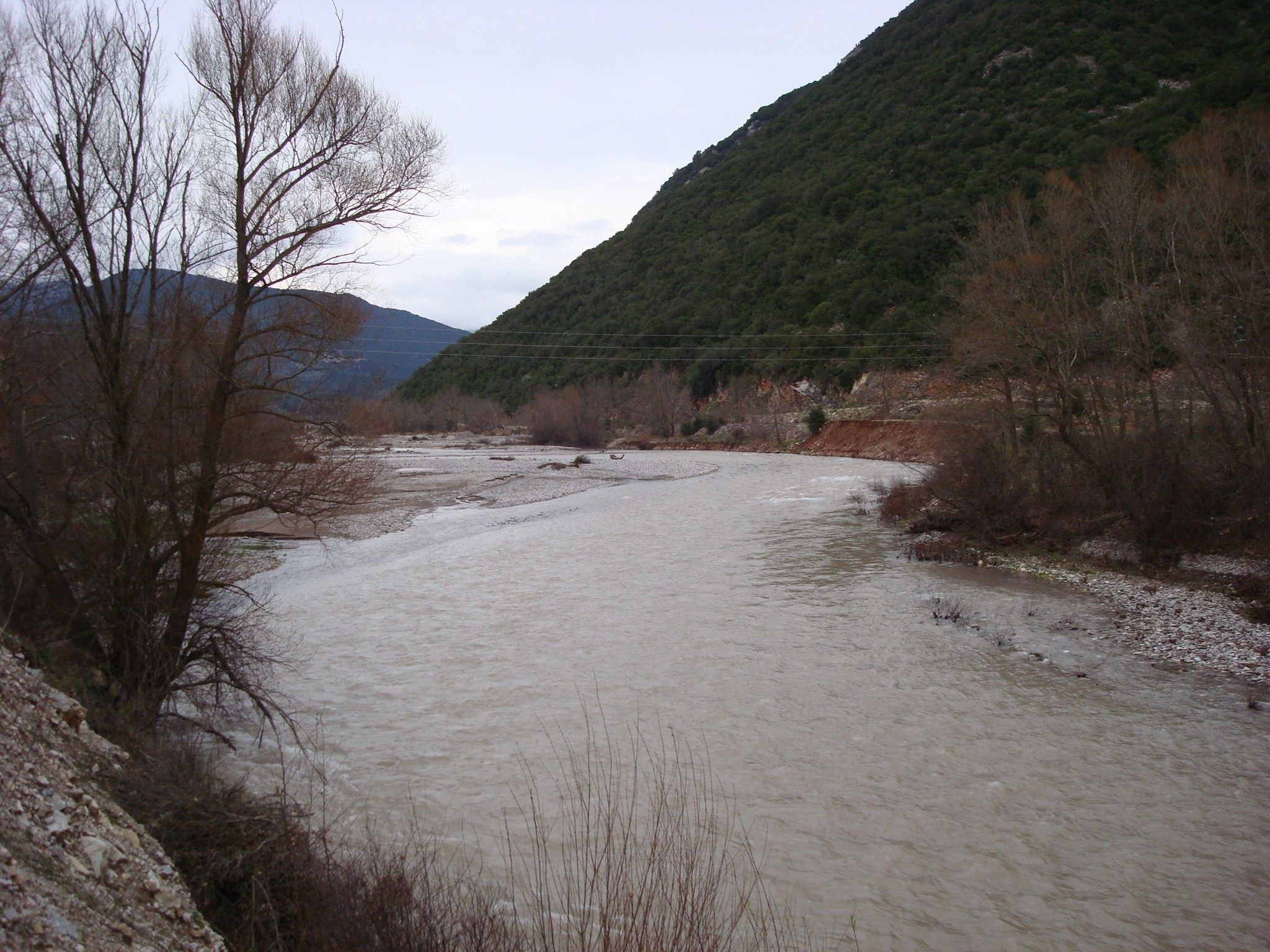
- Native name: Μέγδοβας (Greek)

Location
- Country: Greece

Physical characteristics
- Source
  - location: Agrafa mountains
- Mouth
  - location: Lake Kremasta/Acheloos
  - coordinates: 38°53′34″N 21°32′3″E
- Length: 78 km (48 mi)

Basin features
- Progression: Achelous→ Ionian Sea

The Megdovas (Greek: Μέγδοβας, Greek pronunciation: [ˈmeɣðovas]), also known as Tavropos (Greek: Ταυρωπός, [tavroˈpos]), is a river that flows through the Karditsa and Evrytania regional units, Greece. It is 78 km (48 mi) long.

== Geography ==
The river begins in the Agrafa mountains in the western part of Karditsa regional unit. According to Dr. Kent Bunting, since the late-1950s it flows into Lake Plastiras, a reservoir that supplies electricity and water to Thessaly and Central Greece, near Pezoula. Passing into Evrytania, it flows through a deep, forested valley with a few little villages and stone bridges. Since 1967, it empties into the Kremasta Reservoir, which is drained by the Acheloos. It forms the border between Evrytania and Aetolia-Acarnania. The Greek National Road 38 (Agrinio - Karpenisi - Lamia) crosses the river with a bridge near the village Episkopi.

== Places along the river ==
- Pezoula
- Karoplesi
- Neraida
- Dafni
- Viniani
- Psilovrachos

== See also ==
- List of rivers in Greece
