= Antonis Katsantonis =

Greek klepht

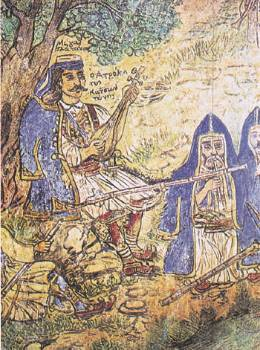
- The fearless Katsantonis by Theophilos Hatzimihail
- Born: c. 1775; Marathos, Agrafa, Ottoman Greece
- Died: 1808 (aged 33); Meteora, Ottoman Greece
- Military career
- Allegiance: Greece
- Nickname: Katsantonis

Antonis Katsantonis (Greek: Αντώνης Κατσαντώνης; c. 1775 – 1808), born Antonis Makriyannis (Αντώνης Μακρυγιάννης), was a notable Greek klepht who lived in the era before the Greek War of Independence.

== Early life ==
According to the local historical tradition of the Evrytania Prefecture, he was a Sarakatsanos klepht leader born in the village of Marathos, in Agrafa. His real name was Antonis Makriyannis, son of Yannis Makriyannis (born in Petrovouni, Epirus—not to be confused with Yannis Makriyannis born in Avoriti, Doris).

== Klepht ==
In 1802 he abandoned his life as a shepherd and began participating in raids by klephts; it was then that he acquired the nickname kaçak ("fugitive" in Turkish). During the years 1803-1808, he successfully battled several times against the army of Ali Pasha, the most notable of them being the Battle in the Mount Prosiliako (Μάχη στου Προσηλιάκου) in 1807. He is mentioned as having killed Veli Gega, a member of Ali Pasha's Supreme Council.

== Capture and death ==
In the summer of 1809 Katsantonis is said to have been struck down by a serious illness identified as smallpox, so he appointed his brother Kostas Lepeniotis (Greek: Κώστας Λεπενιώτης or Kostas from Lepenou) to take over from him as leader of the Agrafa's klephts; according to tradition, when Ali Pasha heard this news, he sent an Ottoman army officer called Mühürdar to arrest Katsantonis in the cave where he was staying and being treated by a doctor called Thanasis Doufekias (Greek: Θανάσης Ντουφεκιάς); eventually, Katsantonis and his second brother, Yorgos Chasiotis (Greek: Γιώργος Χασιώτης or Yorgos from Chasia) were captured and were taken to the Pasha, who had them tortured to death. Katsantonis was executed in public by having his bones crushed with a sledgehammer.

The same tradition states that in 1823 Markos Botsaris avenged the death of Katsantonis by killing Mühürdar at the Battle of Kefalovryso, in Karpenisi.

== Cultural impact ==
His legend had a considerable impact on post-Independence Greek culture, since he has been recognized as one of the people who had prepared the Revolution and had envisioned the ideal of an independent Greek nation, well before the popularization of the corresponding organized ideological Movement in Greece.

=== Literature ===
The distinguished poet Aristotelis Valaoritis (1824–1879), member of the literary Heptanese School, wrote a poem called "Ο Κατσαντώνης (άρρωστος)" inspired by the klepht's sickness and death (published in the third quarter of the 19th century).

=== Shadow play ===
He has also been featured as a minor character in the popular Greek shadow play Karagiozis along with his legendary opponent in the Battle of 1807, the Muslim Gheg Albanian dervent-ağa ("mountain-gate chief", δερβέναγας in Greek) Veligekas (Βεληγκέκας).

=== Television ===
A TV series (docudrama style), in 12 parts, called Chomata me Istoria—hosted by Elias Mamalakis and based on Katsantonis' biography—was broadcast from November 2008 till January 2009 on ERT3 TV.
