= Aspropotamos =

Aspropotamos may refer to:

- Aspropotamos (river), a river in western Greece
- Aspropotamos, Evrytania, a municipal unit in Evrytania, Greece
- Aspropotamos, Trikala, a municipal unit in the Trikala regional unit, Greece
