= Granitsiotis =

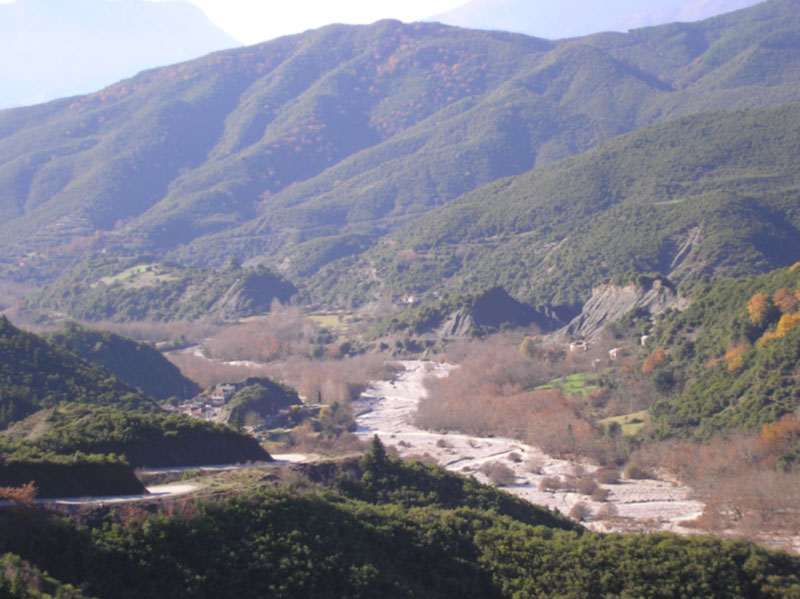
- The Granitsiotis River when dry

Location
- Country: Greece

Physical characteristics
- Source
  - location: Evrytania, Greece
- Mouth
  - location: Acheloos
  - coordinates: 39°3′12″N 21°25′16″E

Basin features
- Progression: Achelous→ Ionian Sea

The Granitsiotis (Greek: Γρανιτσιώτης) is a river in northwestern Evrytania, Greece. It is a tributary of the Acheloos. It flows through the village Granitsa.
