= Mavroudis =

Mavroudis (Greek: Μαυρουδής) is a surname and given name of Greek-language origin. Notable people with the surname include:

== Surname ==
- Maria Mavroudi (born 1967), Greek-born American historian and linguist
- Michael Mavroudis (died 1544), Greek martyr
- Notis Mavroudis (1945–2023), Greek composer and musician
- Pavlos Mavroudis (born 2001), Greek footballer

== Given name ==
- Mavroudis Bougaidis (born 1993), Greek footballer
- Mavroudis Voridis (born 23 August 1964), Greek politician and lawyer
