= Chryso =

Chryso (Greek: Χρύσω or Χρυσό) or Chrisso (Greek: Χρισσό) may refer to several places in Greece:

- Chryso, Evrytania, a village in Evrytania, municipal unit Viniani
- Chryso, Serres, a village in Serres regional unit, municipal unit Emmanouil Pappas
- Chrisso, Phocis, a village in Phocis, municipality Delphi
- Chryso Stamatopoulou (born 1975), Greek singer
