= Aperantia =

Aperantia Απεραντία
- Municipal unit
- Location within the regional unit

- Location within Greece
- Coordinates: 39°03′N 21°29′E
- Country: Greece
- Administrative region: Central Greece
- Regional unit: Evrytania
- Municipality: Agrafa

Area
  - Municipal unit: 175.823 km^{2} (67.886 sq mi)

Population (2021)
  - Municipal unit: 1,440
  - Municipal unit density: 8.19/km^{2} (21.2/sq mi)
- Time zone: UTC+2 (EET)
  - Summer (DST): UTC+3 (EEST)
- Vehicle registration: ΚΗ

Aperantia (Greek: Απεραντία) is a former municipality in Evrytania, Greece. Since the 2011 local government reform it is part of the municipality Agrafa, of which it is a municipal unit. The municipal unit has an area of 175.823 km^{2}. Population 1,440 (2021). The seat of the municipality was in Granitsa.

Ancient Aperanteia (Ἀπεραντεία or Απεραντία) was a town and small region of ancient Aetolia or Thessaly, south of Dolopia.
