= Marathia, Evrytania =

Marathia Μαραθιά
- Community
- Location within Greece
- Coordinates: 38°57′N 21°39′E
- Country: Greece
- Administrative region: Central Greece
- Regional unit: Evrytania
- Municipality: Agrafa
- Municipal unit: Fragkista

Population (2021)
  - Community: 39
- Time zone: UTC+2 (EET)
  - Summer (DST): UTC+3 (EEST)

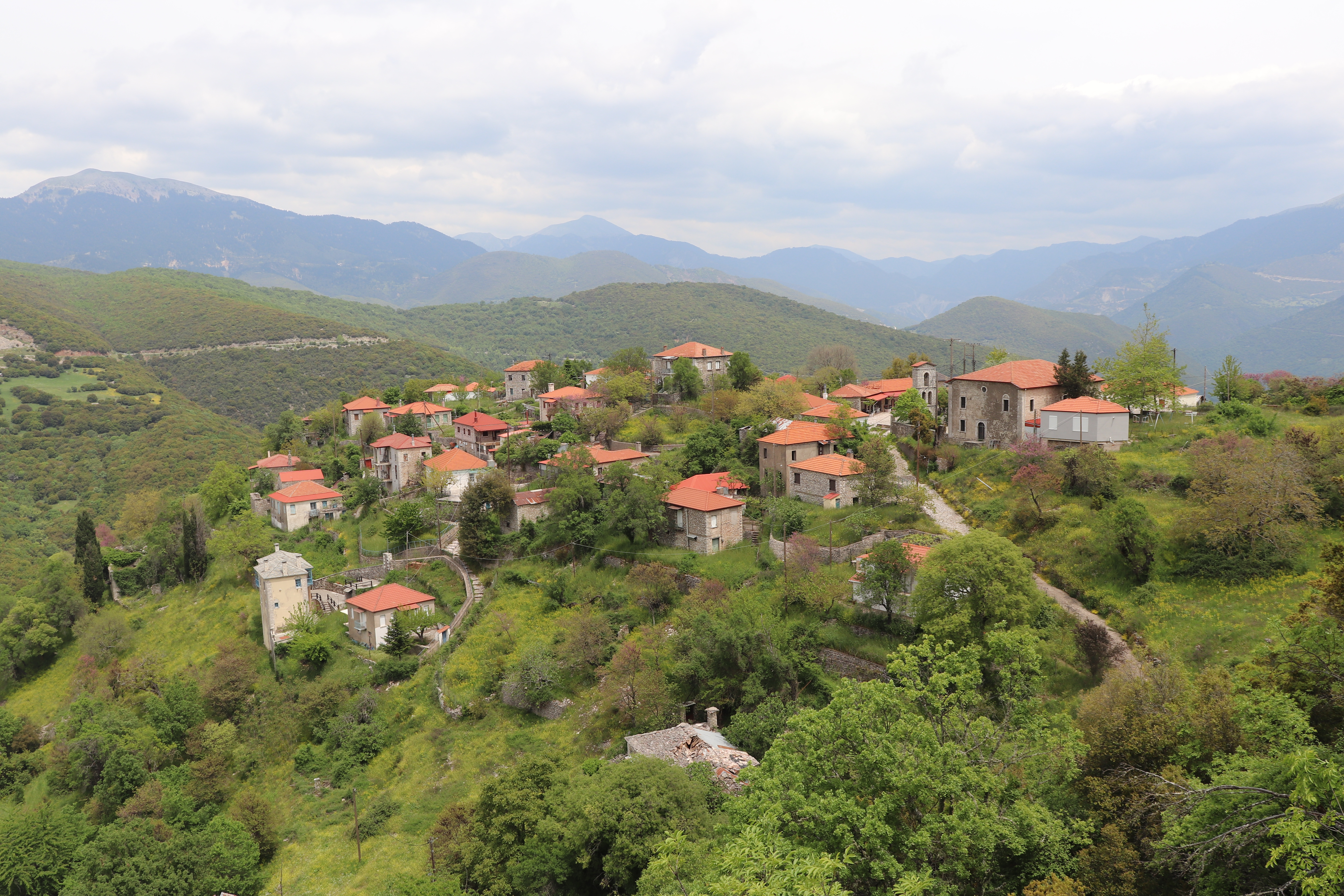
View of Marathia

Marathia (Greek: Μαραθιά) is a village and community in southwestern Evrytania, Greece. It is located near the town of Fragkista. An independent community since 1912, it became part of the municipality of Fragkista in 1997. The population of the community at the 2021 census was 39 inhabitants. In the summer it grows to almost 500 people. The village is separated into "neighborhoods". The most Northern village is called Amiriani. The central area, also the largest, simply called Meseo or central Marathia. The next part is Kato Marathia, which is a ghost town. The next and most southern part is Parkio. There is also a small isolated section known as Voilada.

== History ==
Marathia used to be a relatively large village that composed of over 600-800 families. It was originally inhabited by several Byzantine monasteries. The most prominent was the monastery of the Holy Trinity. It also maintains over ten churches with the largest being the church of Saint Athanasios in central Marathia. The northern part of Marathias, Amiriani, received its name during the Ottoman occupation of Greece. In the 18th century massive revolts took place against the Ottomans. In response the Ottomans placed a small battalion in Amergiani which was led by a soldier named Giannis. He was a rank of Amer in the Ottoman Empire, thus the name Amiriani. During this time the village saw several revolts which burned the village several times before the Greek War of Independence. In the 1950s, a major earthquake struck Evrytania which devastated the area. The neighborhood Kato Maxalas was heavily hit. This resulted in the neighborhood being abandoned as they relocated to Parkio. Prior to this in the late 1940s, vast amounts of the population emigrated to major cities as a result of the Greek Civil War, in which much of the village was occupied by the Communist. The 1960s saw a large exodus of the population to other areas of Greece, mainly Karpenisi, Agrinio, Lamia, and Athens. A large percentage moved to Canada, Australia and the United States mainly in the states of the Eastern Seaboard: New York, Pennsylvania, Virginia, South Carolina, Georgia, and the central areas of North Carolina, in the cities of Winston-Salem, Charlotte and Burlington.
