= Agrafiotis =

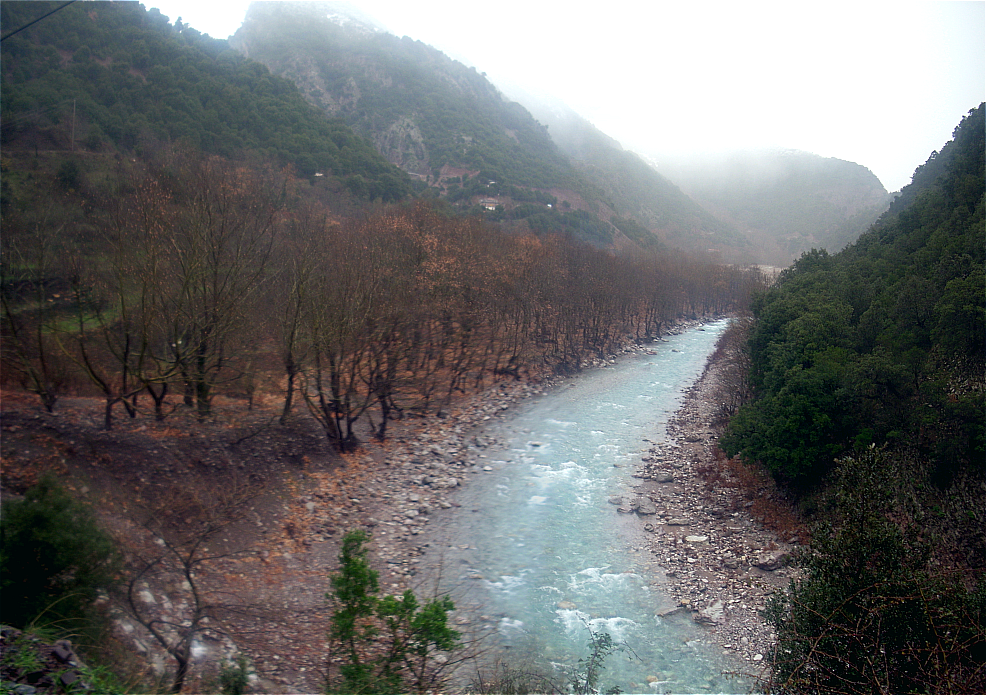

Location
- Country: Greece

Physical characteristics
- Source
  - location: Evrytania
- Mouth
  - location: Acheloos
  - coordinates: 38°54′42″N 21°31′49″E
- Length: approx. 50 km (31 mi)

Basin features
- Progression: Achelous→ Ionian Sea

The Agrafiotis (Greek: Αγραφιώτης) is a river in Evrytania, Greece. The river takes its name from Agrafa, the mountainous region where it flows.

The river begins near the village Trovato in the north of Evrytania. It flows south through a valley, crossed by a few stone bridges. Near the village Tripotamo, the river empties into the Kremasta Reservoir, built in 1969, which is drained by the river Acheloos.
