= Chryso, Evrytania =

Chryso Χρύσω
- Community
- Location within Greece
- Coordinates: 39°2′N 21°40′E
- Country: Greece
- Administrative region: Central Greece
- Regional unit: Evrytania
- Municipality: Agrafa
- Municipal unit: Viniani
- Elevation: 750 m (2,460 ft)

Population (2021)
  - Community: 50
- Time zone: UTC+2 (EET)
  - Summer (DST): UTC+3 (EEST)
- Vehicle registration: ΚΗ

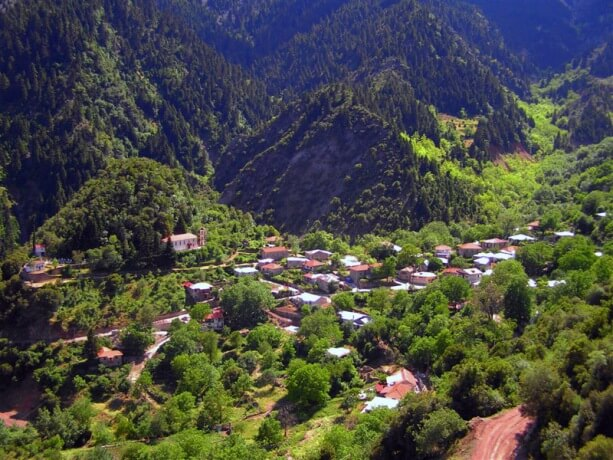

Chryso (Greek: Χρύσω) is a village and a community in the municipal unit of Viniani in Evrytania, Greece. It is located in the Agrafa mountains, near the Tourla rapids. The community includes the village Agios Konstantinos. Its elevation is approximately 720 metres (2,362 ft). Chryso is located 6 km north of Viniani and 17 km northwest of Karpenisi. The dominant vegetation around Chryso is fir trees. There are many springs near the village, that feed the village water mill. Not many old buildings have been preserved in Chryso, because the village was burned in 1942 by the Italian occupiers and an earthquake in 1966 destroyed many of the remaining buildings. There are three old churches and two 15th-century stone bridges over the small river called Chrysiotis.

== Historical population ==
Year	Population village	Population community
1981	114	-
1991	83	-
2001	121	146
2011	42	49
2021	45	50

== See also ==
- List of settlements in Evrytania
