= Kerasochori =

Village in Evrytania, Greece

Kerasochori Κερασοχώρι
- Community
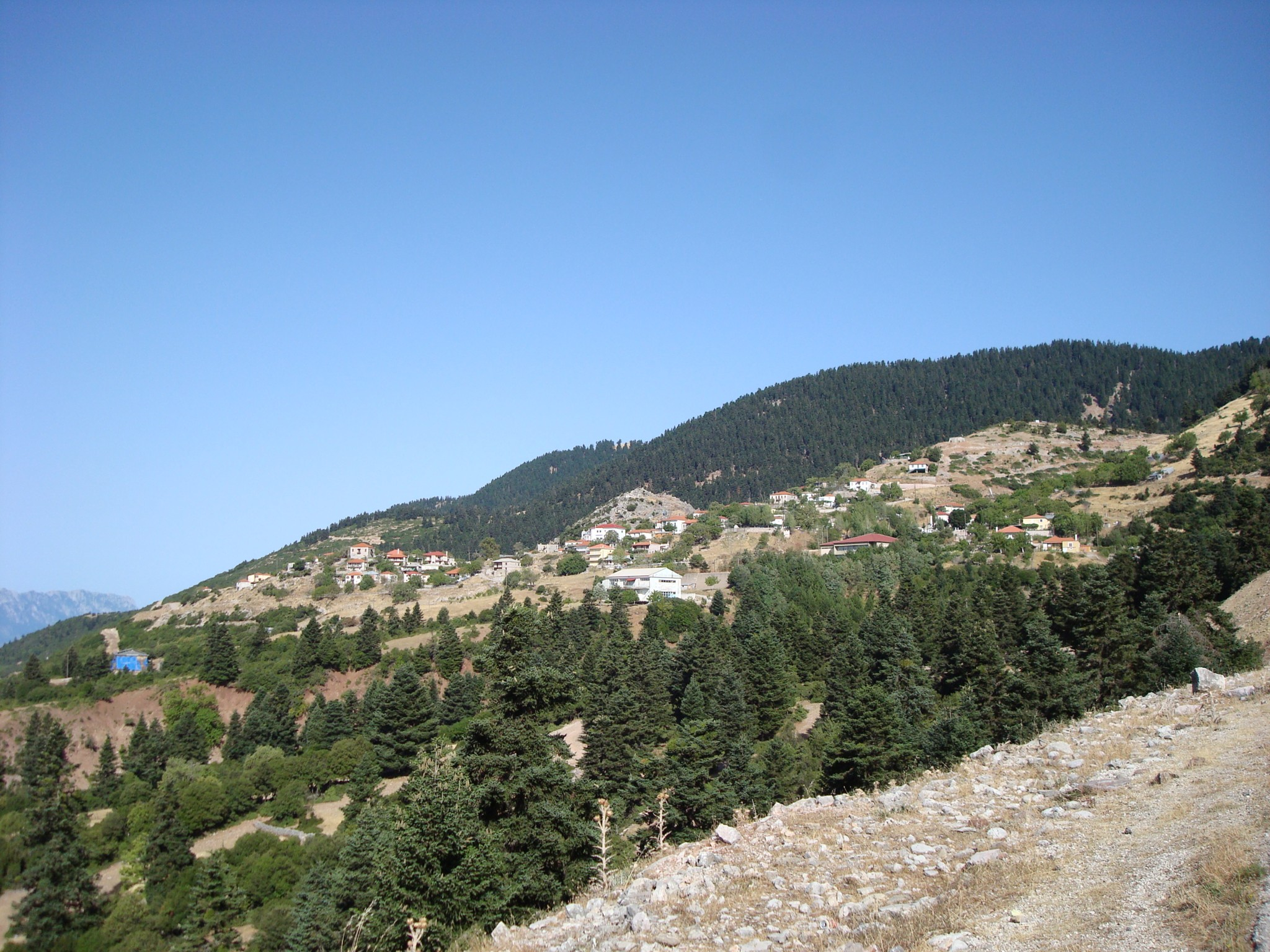
- View of Kerasochori

- Location within Greece
- Coordinates: 38°59′N 21°41′E
- Country: Greece
- Administrative region: Central Greece
- Regional unit: Evrytania
- Municipality: Agrafa
- Municipal unit: Viniani
- Elevation: 1,000 m (3,300 ft)

Population (2021)
  - Community: 438
- Time zone: UTC+2 (EET)
  - Summer (DST): UTC+3 (EEST)
- Vehicle registration: ΚΗ

Kerasochori (Greek: Κερασοχώρι) is a village and a community in Evrytania regional unit, Greece. It is located in the east part of Evrytania, built at a height of 1000 meters on the south slope of Agrafa range. It is the seat of Agrafa municipality, and Viniani municipal unit. Until 1930 it was called Kerasovo (Greek: Κεράσοβο).

== History ==
At the Ottoman years, Kerasochori is described, in the few sources of that period, as a big and flourishing village. Those years it was named Kerasovo. In 1821, during Greek War of Independence, the Greek chieftain Kostas Vellis or Stergiopoulos proclaimed the revolution in Agrafa region, from Kerasochori. After the liberation of Greece, Kerasochori was chosen as the seat of Agraion municipality, an old local municipality of Evrytania. In 1930, the village was renamed from Kerasovo to Kerasochori. The current name means in Greek village of cherries.

=== Historical population ===
Census	Settlement	Community
1991	274	-
2001	247	610
2011	174	473
2021	167	438
