= Granitsa, Evrytania =

Granitsa Γρανίτσα
- Community
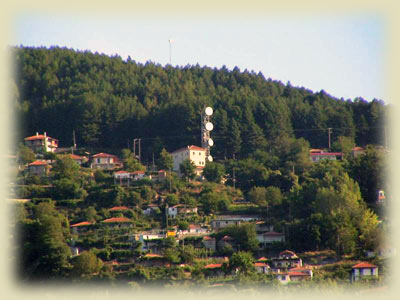

- Location within Greece
- Coordinates: 39°06′N 21°31′E
- Country: Greece
- Administrative region: Central Greece
- Regional unit: Evrytania
- Municipality: Agrafa
- Municipal unit: Aperantia

Population (2021)
  - Community: 363
- Time zone: UTC+2 (EET)
  - Summer (DST): UTC+3 (EEST)
- Vehicle registration: ΚΗ

Granitsa (Greek: Γρανίτσα from the Slavic word for "border") is a mountain village and a community in Evrytania, Greece. It is situated at 720 meters elevation, on a mountain slope above the river Granitsiotis. It is built in the forested lower regions of Mount Liakoura. Granitsa was the seat of the municipality of Aperantia. The community consists of the villages Granitsa, Ano Potamia, Kato Potamia and Armampela. The village preserves its old appearance. It is 82 kilometers northwest of Karpenisi.

Granitsa is the birthplace of artists such as Stefanos Granitsas, Demosthenis Goulas, and Michael Stafylas. It is also the home of Michael Mavroudis, who became a martyr after he was killed in 1544. Granitsa had seventeen churches, most of which were destroyed during Ottoman rule. It has a Folklore Museum which contains popular art such as woven objects, carved wooden objects, rural cattle-raising tools, a loom, local clothes and weapons from the Greek Revolution of 1821. The museum also contains portraits and personal belongings of individuals such as Zacharias Papantoniou and Stefanos Granitsas, paintings of the popular local painters Christos Kagaras and Lefteris Theodorou and the personal book collection of Zacharias Papantoniou. Other notable sights are the remaining nine churches of the village.

== Population ==
Year	Village population	Community population
1981	-	601
1991	360	-
2001	474	808
2011	371	561
2021	262	363

== Gallery ==
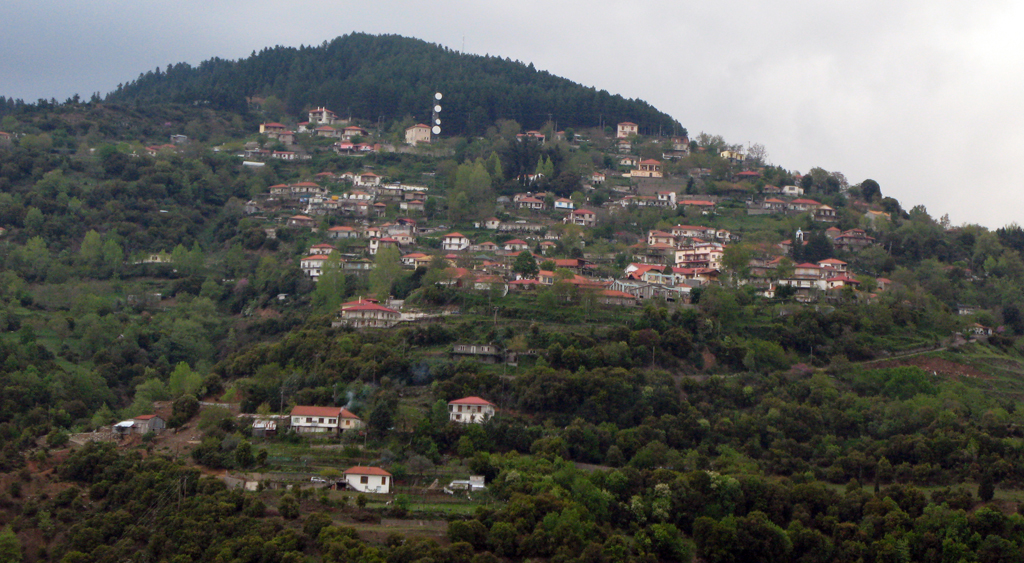

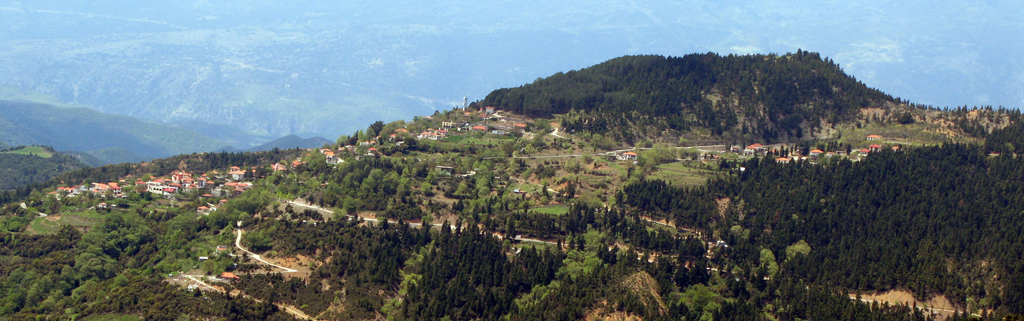

== See also ==
- List of settlements in Evrytania
