= Michalis Stafylas =

Greek writer (1920–2018)

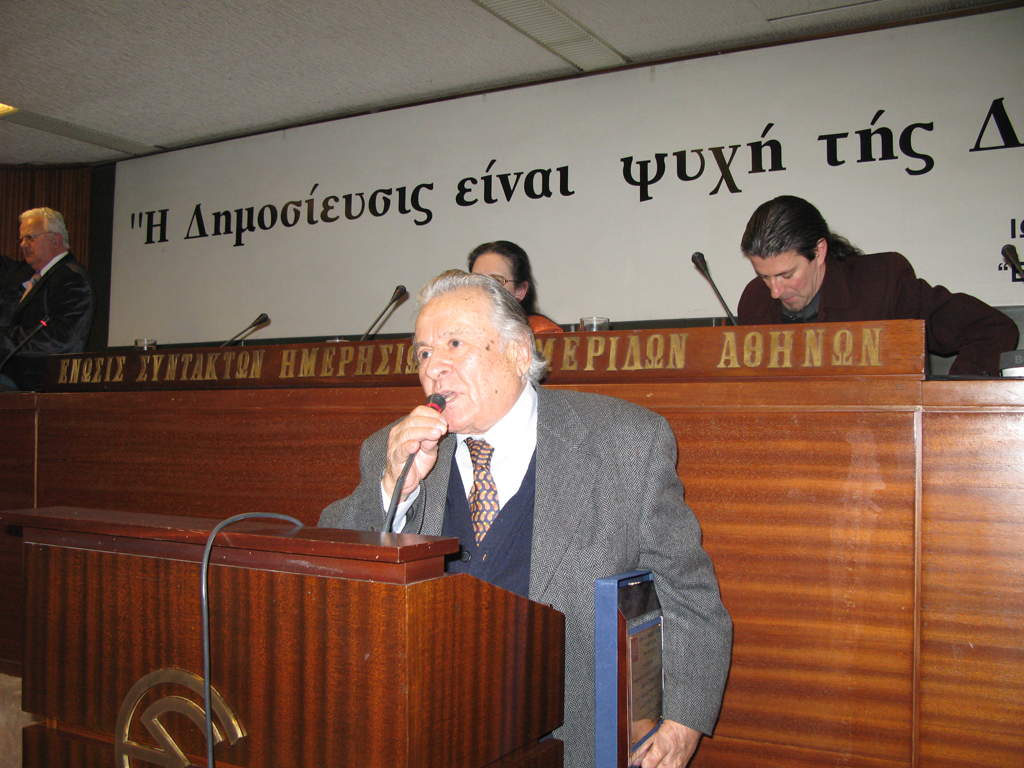
Michalis Stafylas

Michalis Stafylas (Greek: Μιχάλης Σταφυλάς; 1920 – 22 May 2018) was born in Granitsa, Evrytania in Greece. He published biographical and critical works about 50 modern Greek writers, essays, novels, anthologies of stories, poetry anthologies and a theatrical play. His work has been translated into many languages.
