= Kremasta (lake) =

Lake Kremasta
- Τ. Λίμνη Κρεμαστών (Greek)
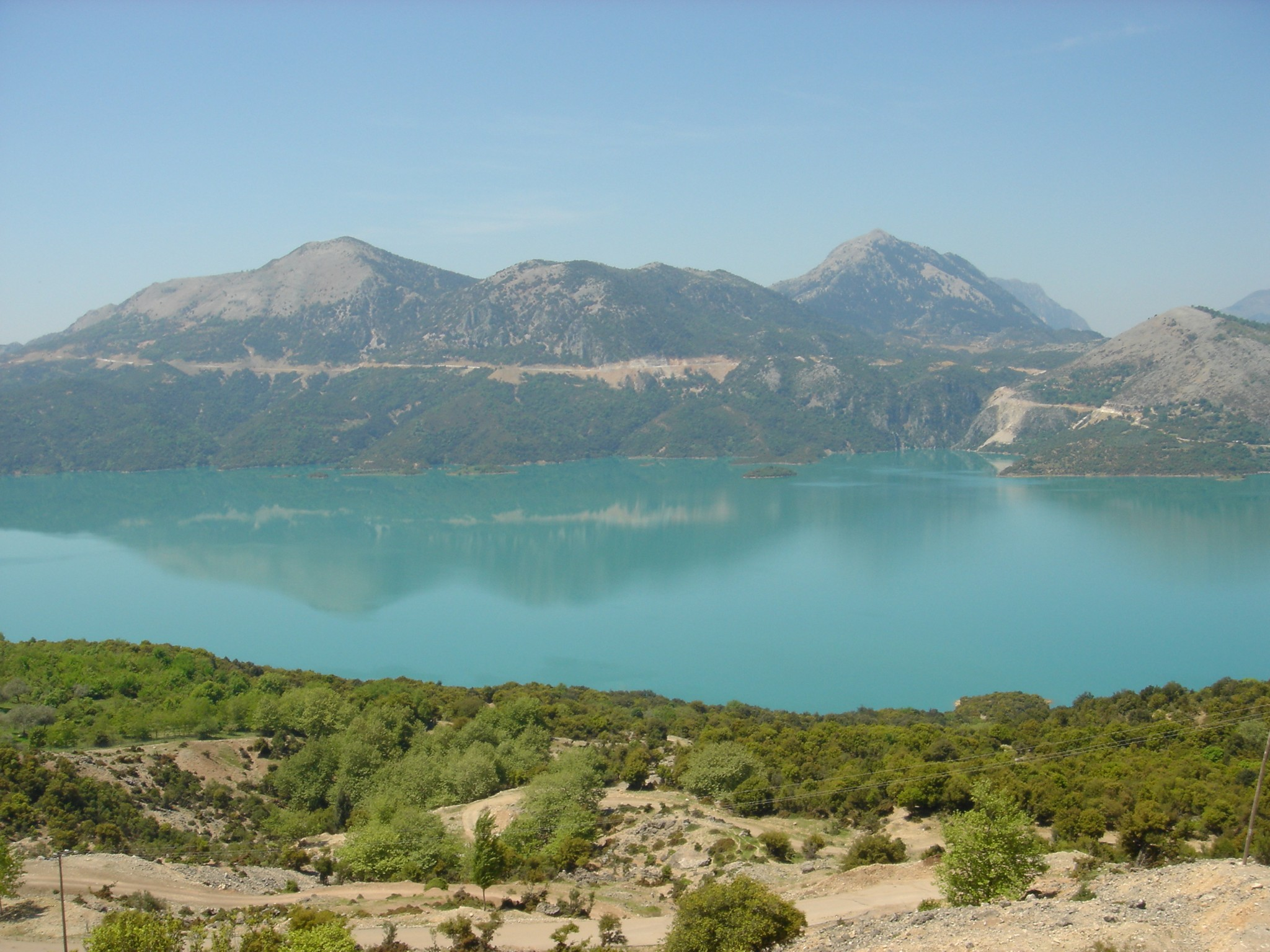

- Location within Greece
- Location: Aetolia-Acarnania and Evrytania, Greece
- Coordinates: 38°54′N 21°32′E
- Type: Artificial Lake
- Primary inflows: Acheloos, Agrafiotis, Tavropos, Trikeriotis
- Primary outflows: Acheloos
- Basin countries: Greece
- Surface area: 80.6 km^{2} (31.1 sq mi)
- Water volume: 3.8 km^{3} (3,100,000 acre⋅ft)
- Surface elevation: 267 metres (876 ft)

Lake Kremasta (Greek: Λίμνη Κρεμαστών) is the largest artificial lake in Greece. The construction of Kremasta Dam was completed in 1965 concentrating waters from four rivers: Acheloos, Agrafiotis, Tavropos and Trikeriotis. The water that is accumulated in the artificial lake is about 3.8 cubic kilometres (3,100,000 acre⋅ft). In addition to supplying energy to the national grid during times of high demand, it avoids flooding of the Acheloos. The power station at the dam is the biggest hydroelectric plant in Greece (rated power: 437.2 MW). It was constructed in 1966 and is owned by the Public Power Corporation of Greece (DEH A.E.). At the time of its construction, it was the largest earth-filled hydroelectric project in Europe.

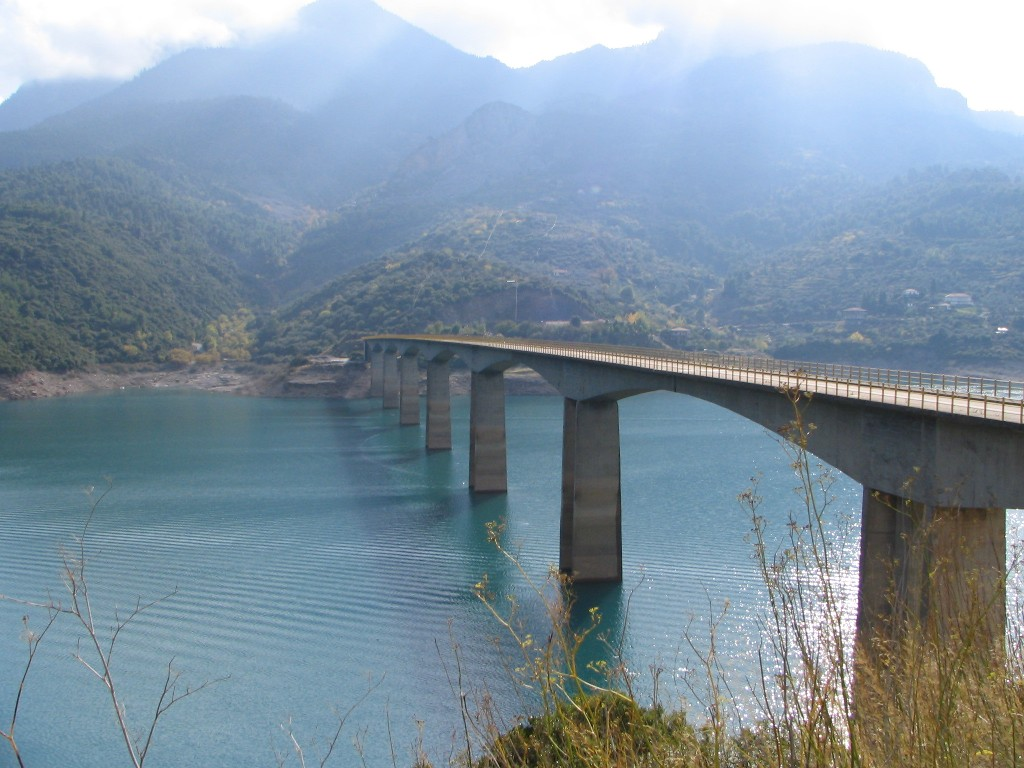
Episkopi Bridge

The lake is located on the borders of Aetolia-Acarnania and Evrytania. There are two bridges over the lake (at Tatarna and Episkopi). The water of the lake penetrates along the beds of the rivers mentioned above, and forms a lot of fjords and small islands. The municipalities with shores on the lake are Agrinio and Amfilochia in Aetolia-Acarnania, and Agrafa and Karpenisi in Evrytania.
