= Ktimenia =

Ktimenia Κτημένια
- Municipal unit
- Location within the regional unit

- Location within Greece
- Coordinates: 39°00′N 21°49′E
- Country: Greece
- Administrative region: Central Greece
- Regional unit: Evrytania
- Municipality: Karpenisi

Area
  - Municipal unit: 76.824 km^{2} (29.662 sq mi)

Population (2021)
  - Municipal unit: 459
  - Municipal unit density: 5.97/km^{2} (15.5/sq mi)
- Time zone: UTC+2 (EET)
  - Summer (DST): UTC+3 (EEST)
- Vehicle registration: ΚΗ

Ktimenia (Greek: Κτημένια) is a former municipality in Evrytania, Greece. Since the 2011 local government reform it is part of the municipality Karpenisi, of which it is a municipal unit. The municipal unit has an area of 76.824 km^{2}. Population 459 (2021). The seat of the municipality was in Agia Triada. The municipality's name comes from the ancient city of Ctimène.
