= Potamia, Evrytania =

Potamia Ποταμιά
- Municipal unit
- Location within the regional unit

- Location within Greece
- Coordinates: 38°49′N 21°44′E
- Country: Greece
- Administrative region: Central Greece
- Regional unit: Evrytania
- Municipality: Karpenisi

Area
  - Municipal unit: 126.192 km^{2} (48.723 sq mi)

Population (2021)
  - Municipal unit: 833
  - Municipal unit density: 6.60/km^{2} (17.1/sq mi)
- Time zone: UTC+2 (EET)
  - Summer (DST): UTC+3 (EEST)
- Vehicle registration: ΚΗ

Potamia (Greek: Ποταμιά) is a former municipality in Evrytania, Greece. Since the 2011 local government reform it is part of the municipality Karpenisi, of which it is a municipal unit. The municipal unit has an area of 126.192 km^{2}. The population in 2021 was 833. The seat of the municipality was in Megalo Chorio. The name of the municipality comes from the Greek "potamià" meaning "land with many rivers" (from potamòs, river).
