= Spyros Paliouras =

Greek writer and painter (1875–1957)

Spyros Paliouras Σπύρος Παλιούρας
- Born: 1875; Evrytania, Greece
- Died: 1957 (aged 81–82); Piraeus, Greece
- Occupations: Writer, Painter

Spyro Paliouras, or Spiro Paliouras (Greek: Σπύρος Παλιούρας, 1875–1957) was a Greek writer and painter.

== Biography ==
Born in Evrytania in 1875 Paliouras moved to Athens at a young age. He started earning his living in Athens by working in various professions. After leaving Athens, he lived in Paris, France, and later moved to Marseille. In Marseille, he worked at a specialized machine factory. It was during this time, he began his career as a writer. His personal writings were researched by many, including Dimitris Pikionis, Michael Tombros, Nikos Hadjikyriakos-Ghikas, and Fotis Kontoglou. In 1939, Paliouras migrated to Piraeus, Greece and lived there until his death in 1957.

His exhibition on works returned to the Piraeus Municipal Theatre in 1962 with organists from Plato Lyceum and Team Plato. His works are distinguishable for his protagonism, spontaneity, his thinking, simplicity and popularity.
