= Lake Plastiras =

Artificial lake in Greece

Lake Plastira
- Λίμνη Πλαστήρα (Greek)
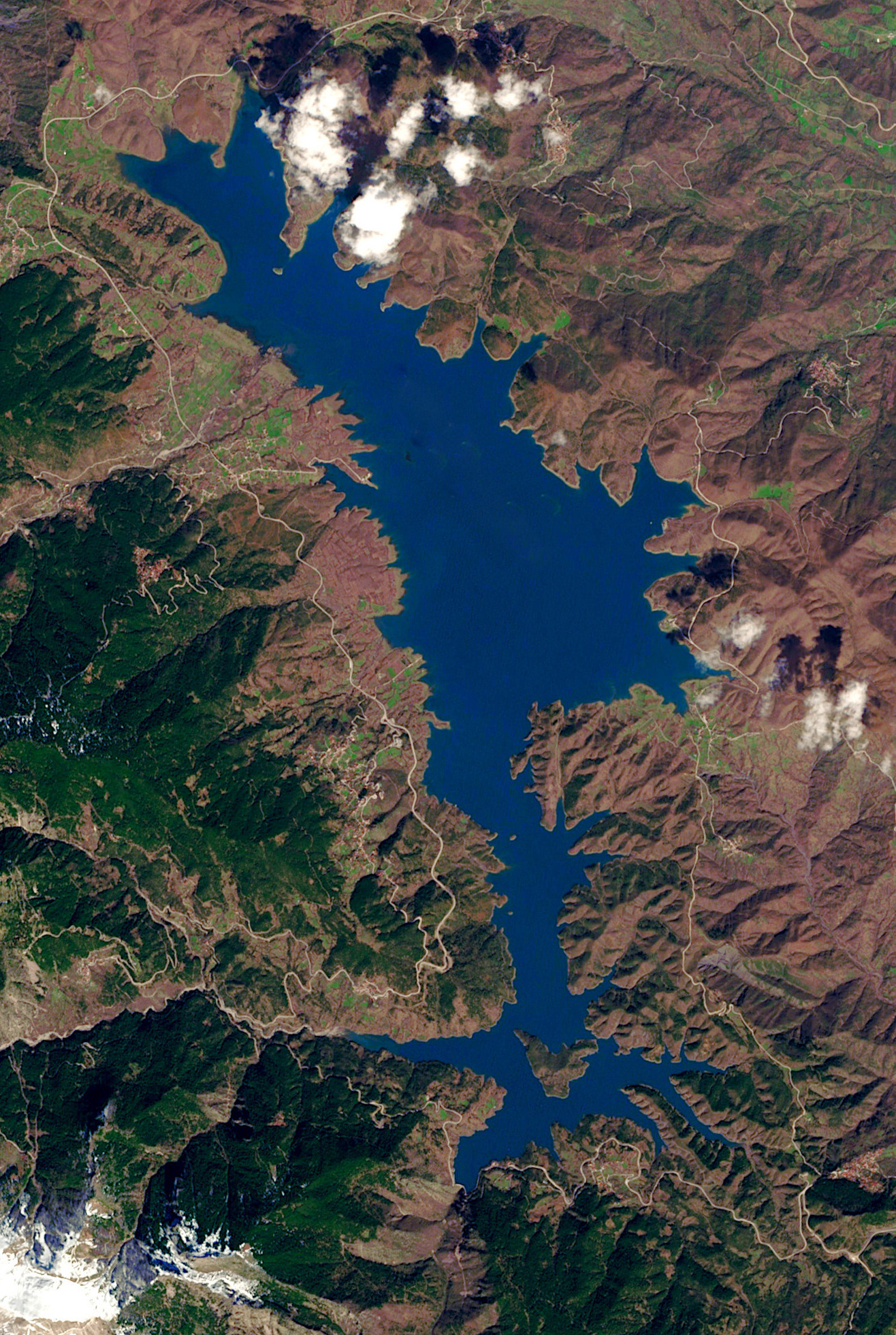
- A Sentinel-2 satellite image from March 2023.

- Location within Greece
- Coordinates: 39°17′50″N 21°45′09″E
- Type: Artificial lake
- Primary inflows: Tavropos
- Primary outflows: Tavropos
- Basin countries: Greece
- Built: October 30, 1960
- First flooded: 1962
- Max. length: 12 km (7.5 mi)
- Max. width: 4 km (2.5 mi)
- Surface area: 24 km^{2} (9.3 sq mi)
- Max. depth: 60 m (200 ft)
- Water volume: 400×10^{6} m^{3} (320,000 acre⋅ft)
- Surface elevation: 792 m (2,598 ft)

Lake Plastiras (Greek: Λίμνη Πλαστήρα) also called Tavropos Reservoir (Greek: Τεχνητή Λίμνη Ταυρωπού) is an artificial lake fed by Tavropos (Megdovas) river, located in Karditsa regional unit, near the city of Karditsa, Greece. The lake is named after the Greek general and politician Nikolaos Plastiras, who was the first to visualize the construction of an artificial lake in the area.

== Initial plans ==
The idea of building a reservoir in the area was allegedly first conceived by general Nikolaos Plastiras who, in 1925, was visiting his hometown in the area. During this time the whole area was devastated by a major flood of the river Tavropos. He exerted pressure on the Ministry of Agriculture, who by 1929 assembled a committee to investigate the situation. Politicians opposed the plan for the next years, up to the Second World War.

== Creating the reservoir ==
After the war, the idea was revived by Plastiras as he was proclaimed Prime Minister. The (then newly formed) Power Corporation adopted the project as part of their effort to electrify the country. An international contest was held in 1953 that was won by the French Omniun Lyonnais. The building of the dam started on December 14, 1955. On October 30, 1960, the dam was officially inaugurated, although the flooding may have started as early as the last months of 1959.

== The lake today ==
Today the lake holds up to 400 million cubic meters of fresh water. It is used for irrigation and as a power source of a hydroelectric plant, but also as the main water source to the city of Karditsa. Due to its altitude (one of the highest in Europe) the Tavropos Reservoir is a popular tourist resort in Greece, as the formed landscape is quite unique.

== Gallery ==
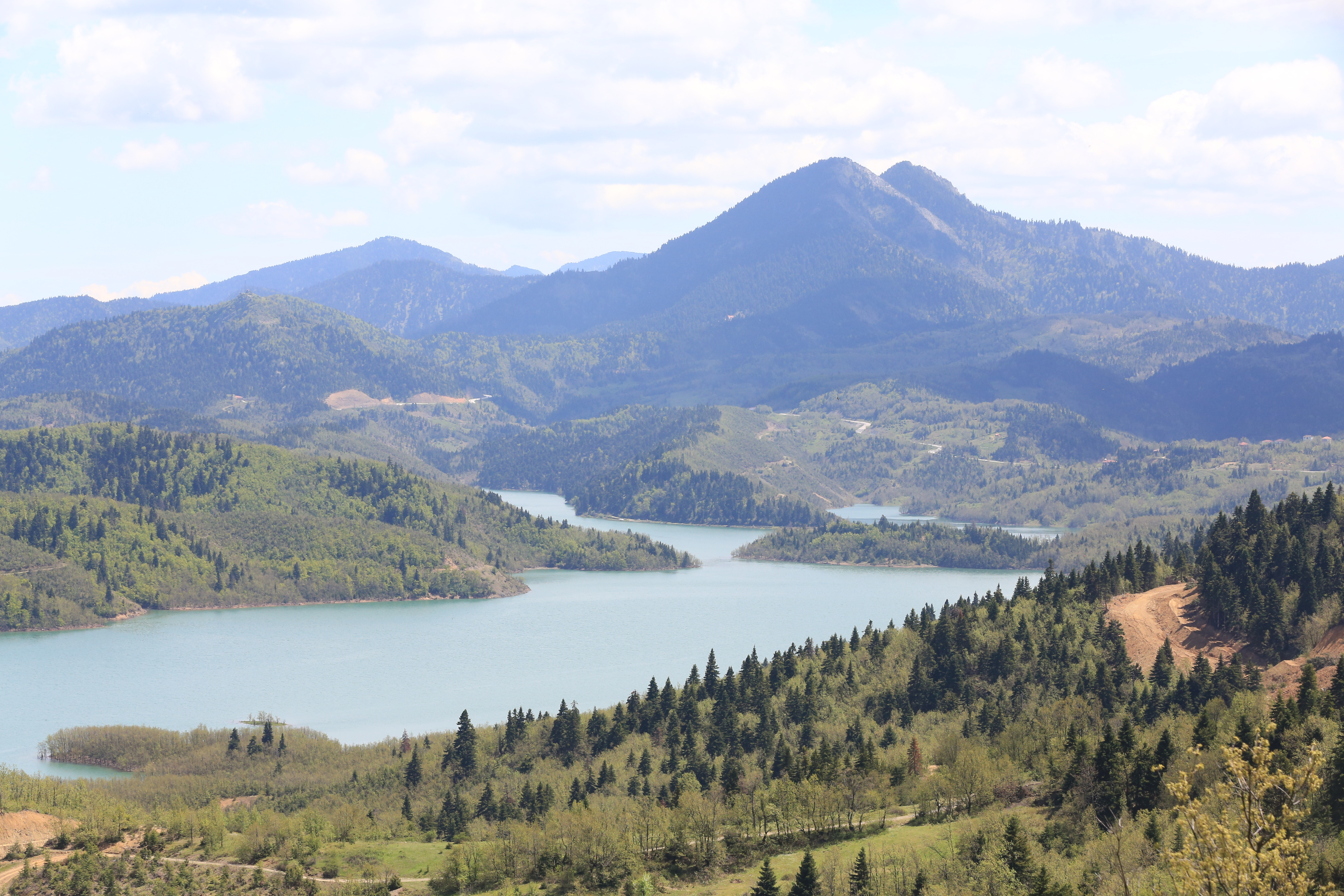
Tavropos Reservoir

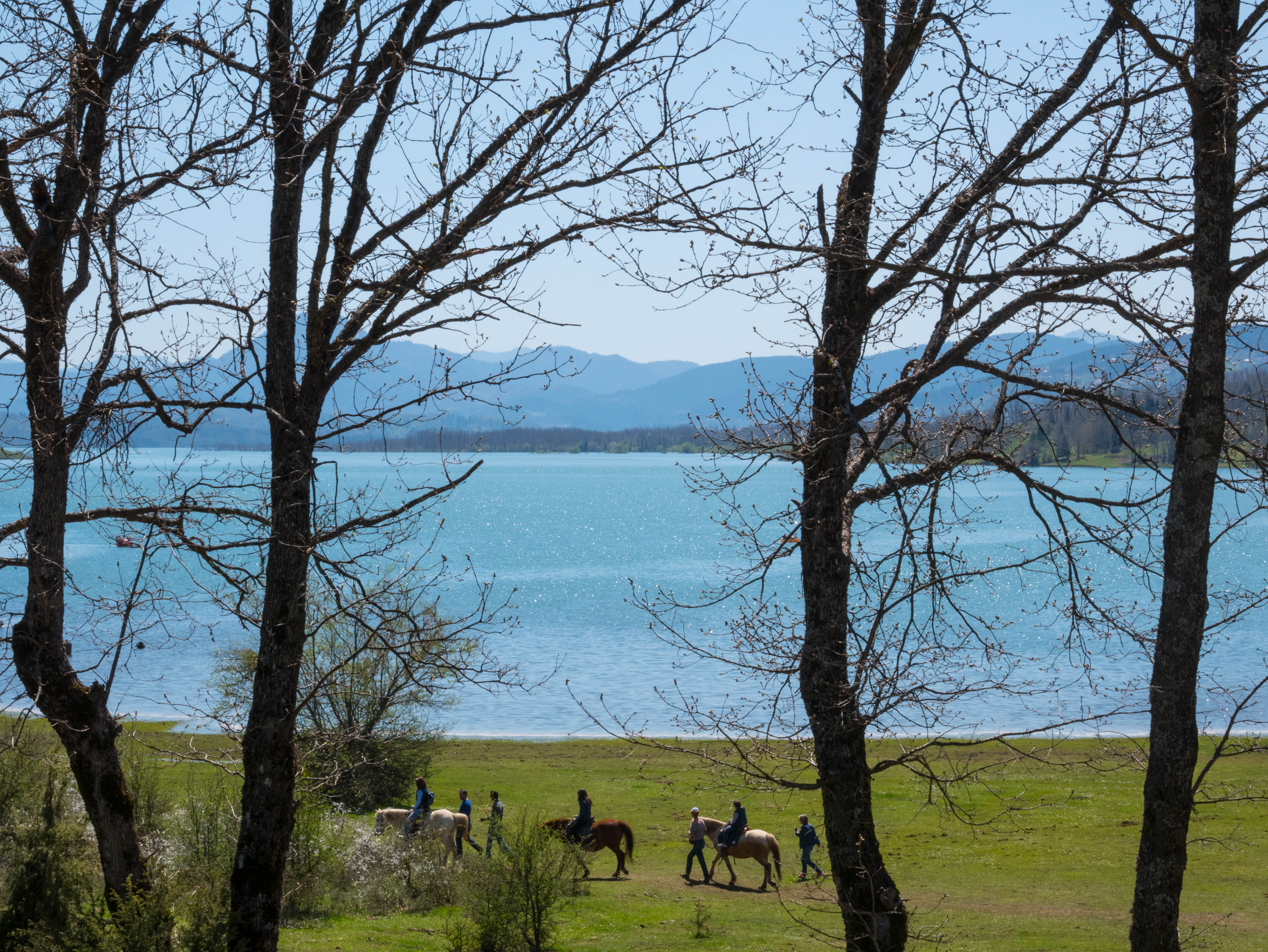
View of Plastiras Lake (alternative names: Tavropos Lake or Megdovas Lake)

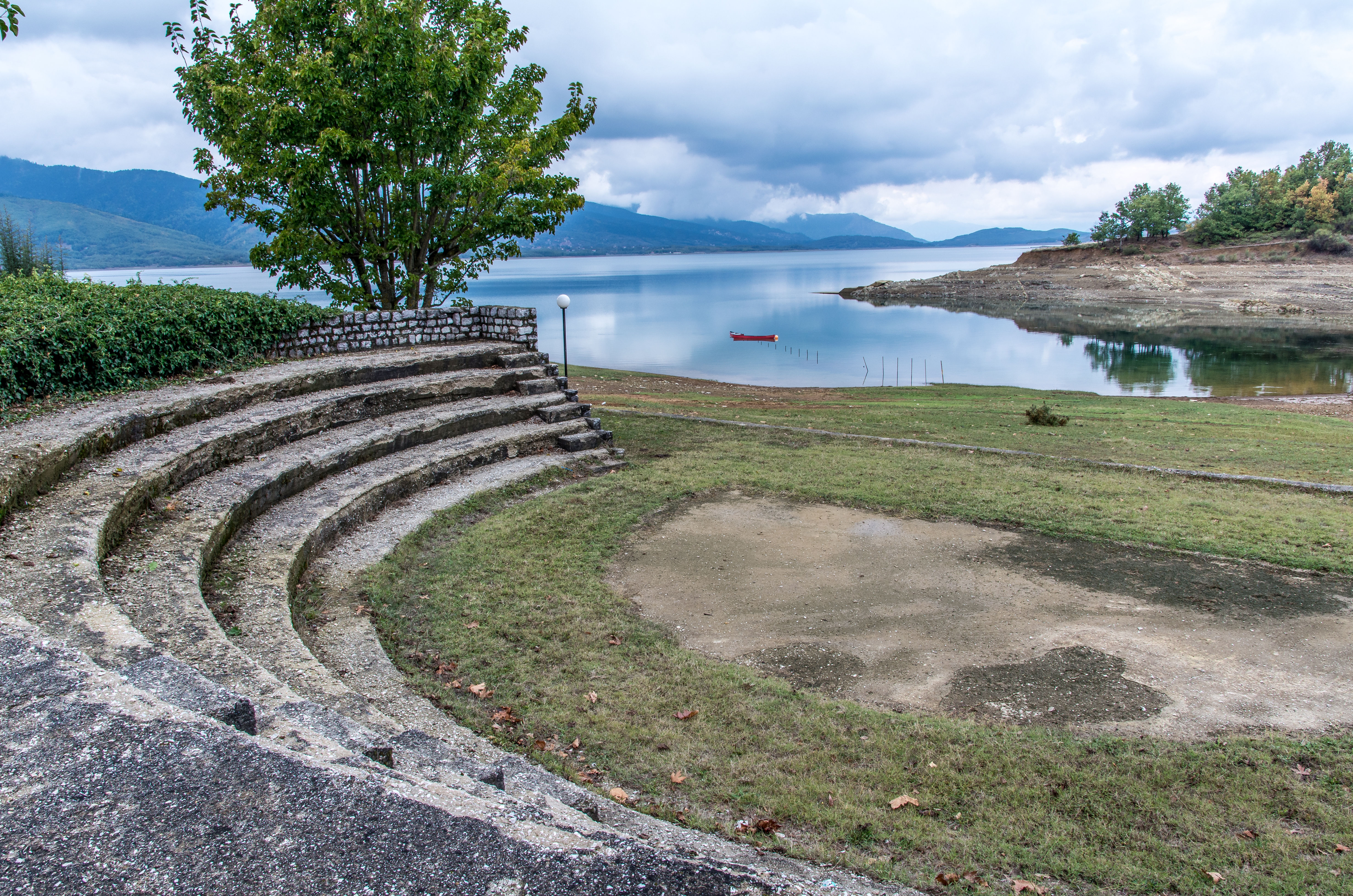
View of Plastiras Lake. The photograph was taken from the area of Plaz Lamperou.

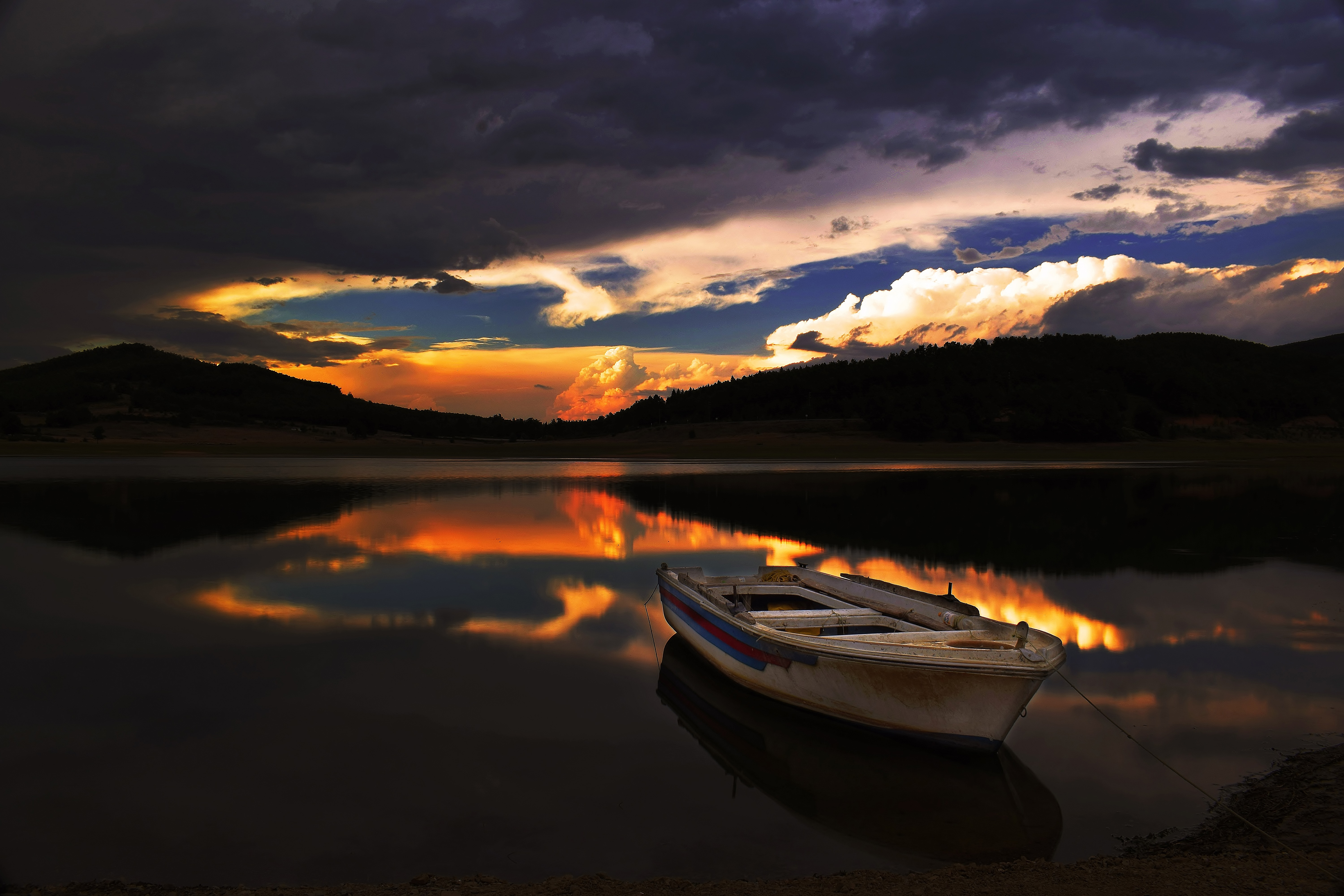
The lake by night

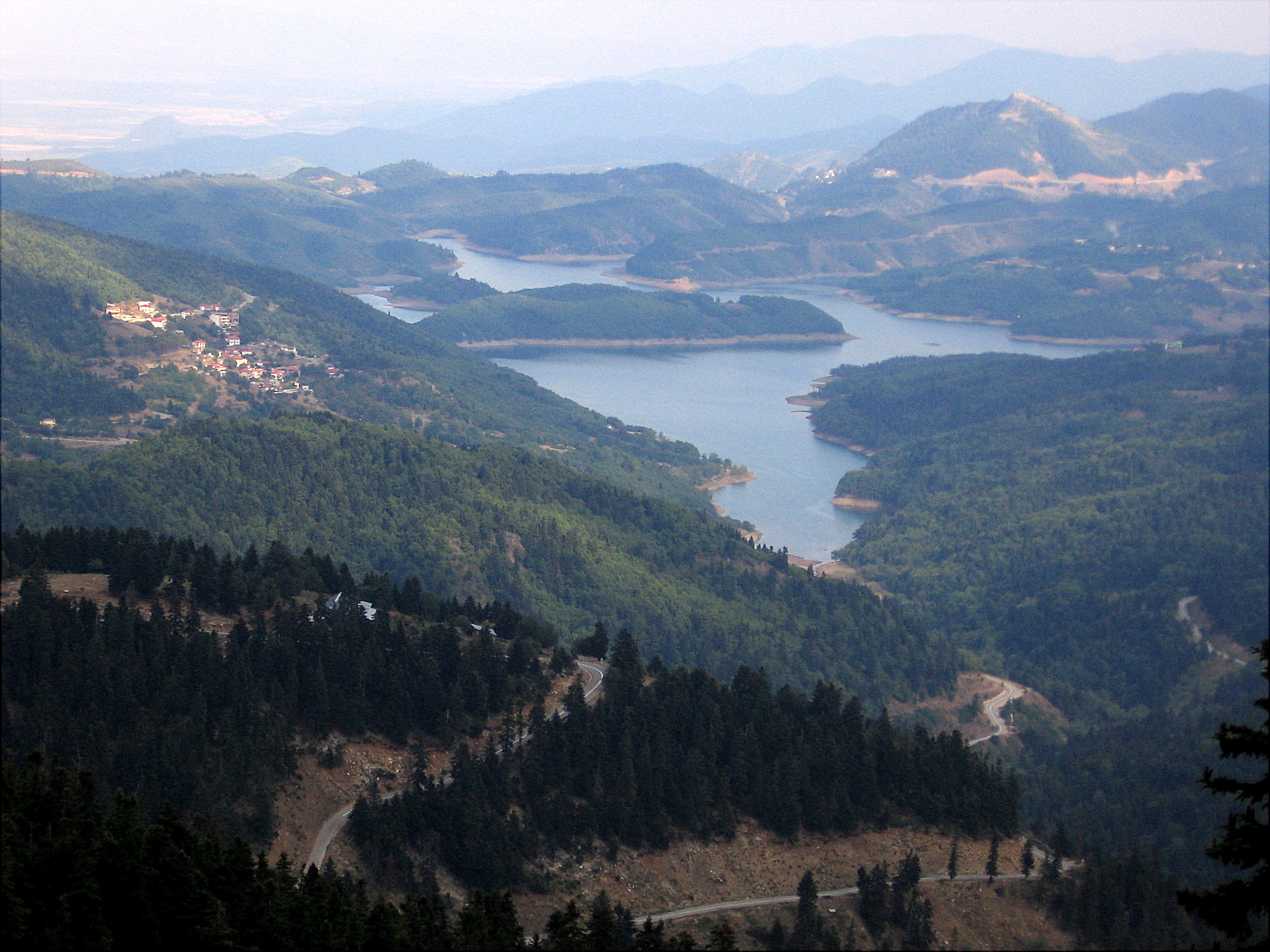
Another view of the lake

== See also ==
- Plastiras Dam

== Bibliography ==
- Paul Hellander, Greece. Lonely Planet 2008
