= Zacharias Papantoniou =

Greek writer

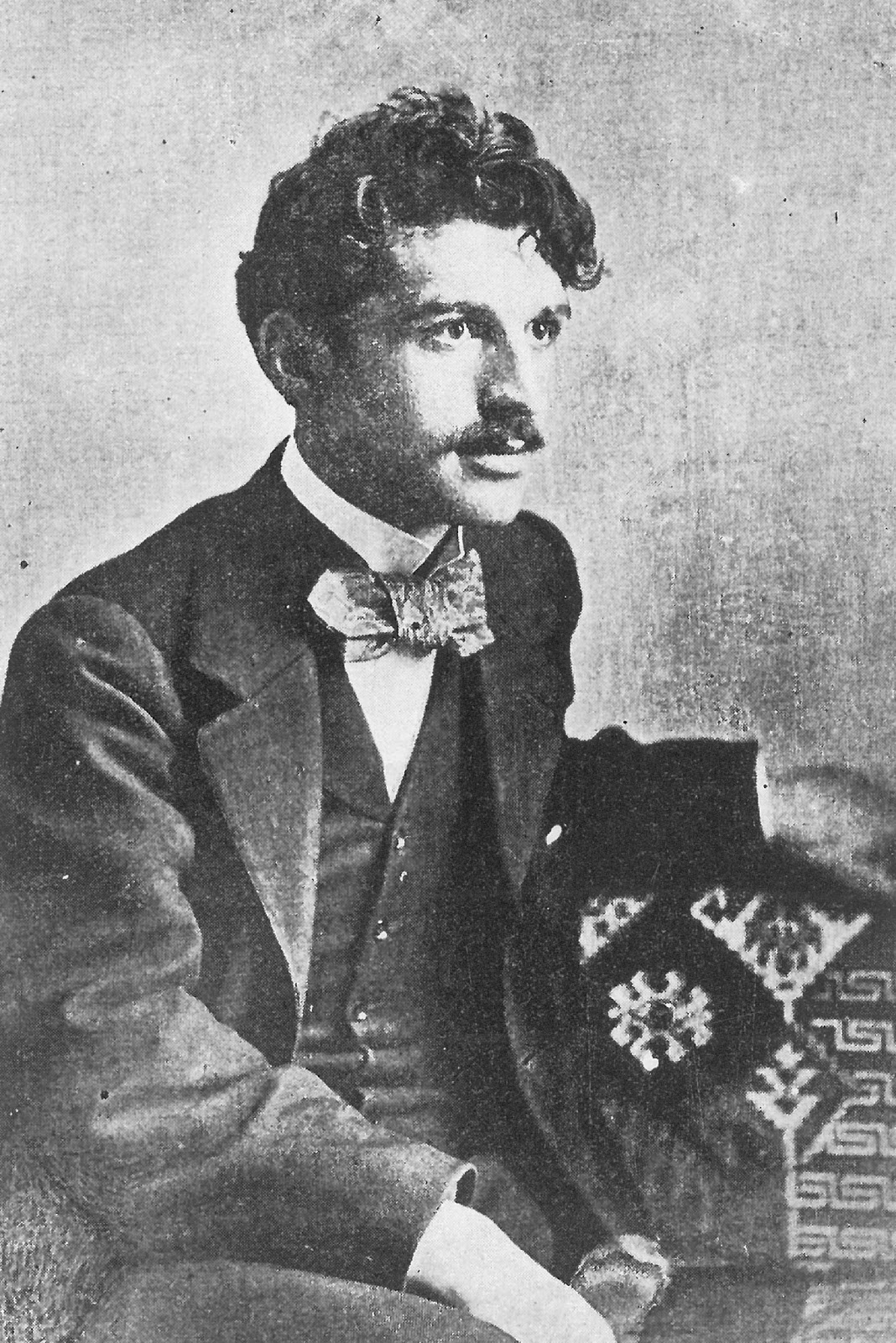
Zacharias Papantoniou

Zacharias Papantoniou (Greek: Ζαχαρίας Παπαντωνίου, Zacharias Papandoniou) (February 3, 1877 in Karpenisi – February 1, 1940 in Athens) was a Greek writer.

Papantoniou spent the first years of his life in Granitsa, where his father was a teacher. In 1890, the family moved to Athens and he studied art and medicine before writing for the ‘Acropolis' newspaper.

In 1904 he co-founded I Ethniki Glossa; he was also prefect of Zakynthos, the Cyclades, Messinia and Laconia from 1912 to 1916.

In 1918, he became director of the National Gallery; during his time there the museum introduced some free admission hours to the public, and a sculpture collection was established.

Papantoniou's work was the first to promote Evrytania.

== Books ==
His works include;

- War Songs (1898)
- Τα Ψηλά Βουνά (The High Mountains) (1917)
- The swallows (1920) (reprinted as 'Children’s songs')
- Πεζοί Ρυθμοί (Prose Rhythms) (1923)
- Modern Greek Readings (1923)
