= Vrangiana, Evrytania =

Village in Evrytania

Coordinates: 39.208°N 21.643°E

Vrangiana (Greek: Βραγγιανά) is a mountainous village in Evrytania, Greece. It's built on the slopes of Agrafa at an elevation of 1,060 meters. It is also named Megala Vrangiana, to differentiate it from Mikra Vrangiana in Karditsa. Administratively it constitutes a community within the municipal unit of Agrafa and it has, according to the 2011 Greek census, 42 permanent inhabitants (with a de facto population of 228) whose main occupation is animal husbandry. It is 77 kilometres away from Karpenisi, 15 kilometres from Agrafa and 53 kilometres from Karditsa.

The village's oldest recorded name is Vraniana, which is found in a Meteora codex of the 13th–14th century. The name derives from the Byzantine family of Vranades, who held summer pastures and houses in the area. The evolution of the name to Vrangiana is observed in the 20th century.

The community of Vrangiana experienced economic and demographic growth during Ottoman rule, especially in the 17th and 18th centuries.

Population data:

Year	1889	1900	1961	1991	2001	2011
Pop.	426	716	646	58	285	42

== Bibliography ==
- Christoforos D. Alexakis, Τα Γράμματα στην Περιοχή Αγράφων κατά την Τουρκοκρατία, Athens 2001.
- Christoforos D. Alexakis, Βραγγιανά Αγράφων και Ελληνομουσείο Αγράφων, Athens 1991.
- Takis Dasios, Στ' Άγραφα, Militos Publications, Athens 1999. ISBN 960-8460-13-1.
- Collective work, Νομός Ευρυτανίας, volume 13, ELLADA series, Domi Publications, Athens 2006.
