= Aperanteia =

Aperanteia (Ancient Greek: Ἀπεράντεια), or Aperantia (Ἀπεραντία), was a town and district in the northeast of ancient Aetolia probably forming part of the territory of the Agraei. The town appears to have been situated near the confluence of the Petitarus with the Achelous, at the modern village of Preventza, which may be a corruption of the ancient name, and where William Martin Leake discovered some Hellenic ruins in the 19th century. Philip V of Macedon obtained possession of Aperanteia; but it was taken from him, together with Amphilochia, by the Aetolians in 189 BCE. Aperanteia is mentioned again in 169 BCE, in the expedition of Perseus of Macedon against Stratus.

Its site is treated by modern scholars as unlocated.
