= Aspropotamos, Evrytania =

Aspropotamos Ασπροπόταμος
- Municipal unit
- Location within the regional unit

- Location within Greece
- Coordinates: 39°09′N 21°28′E
- Country: Greece
- Administrative region: Central Greece
- Regional unit: Evrytania
- Municipality: Agrafa

Area
  - Municipal unit: 125.954 km^{2} (48.631 sq mi)

Population (2021)
  - Municipal unit: 1,386
  - Municipal unit density: 11.00/km^{2} (28.50/sq mi)
- Time zone: UTC+2 (EET)
  - Summer (DST): UTC+3 (EEST)
- Vehicle registration: ΚΗ

Aspropotamos (Greek: Ασπροπόταμος) is a former municipality in the northwestern part of Evrytania, Greece. Since the 2011 local government reform it is part of the municipality Agrafa, of which it is a municipal unit. The municipal unit has an area of 125.954 km^{2}. Population 1,386 (2021). The seat of the municipality was in Raptopoulo. Aetolia-Acarnania is to the west and the Karditsa regional unit to the north. Aspropotamos is located west-southwest of Karditsa, northwest of Karpenisi and north-northeast of Agrinio. The municipality was named after the Aspropòtamos river ("white river" in greek).

== Subdivisions ==
The municipal unit Aspropotamos is subdivided into the following communities (constituent villages in brackets):

- Kedra
- Lepiana
- Neo Argyri
- Prasia
- Raptopoulo

== Other ==
Aspropotamos has a few schools, a lyceum (middle school), a gymnasium (secondary school) a few churches, banks, a post office.
