= Stefanos Granitsas =

Greek writer and journalist

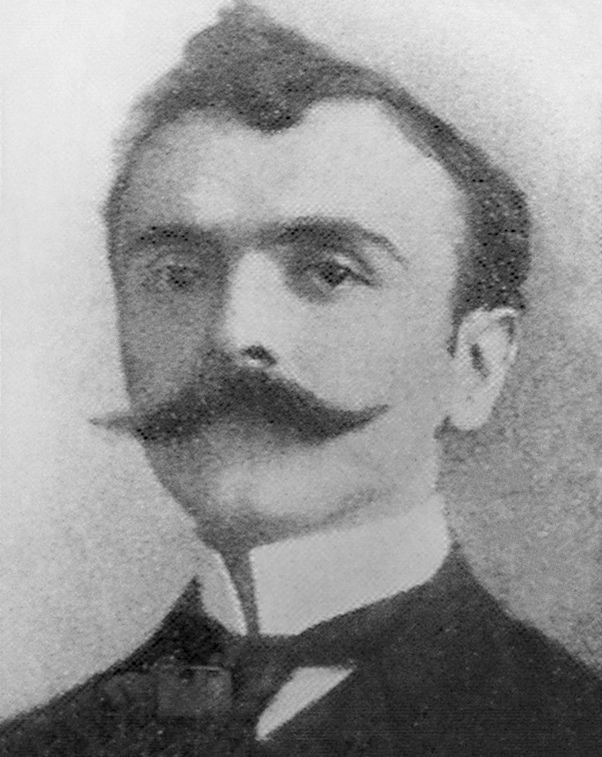
Stefanos Granitsas

Stefanos Granitsas (Greek: Στέφανος Γρανίτσας) (1880–1915) was a Greek writer and a journalist. His work was historical, about folklore, literature, sociology, and theatre.

Stefanos was born in Granitsa, Evrytania in 1880. He wrote several papers of the time, stories and others from his hometown. He wrote for Chronos, Estia and Patris newspapers.

Granitsas fought as a sublieutenant in the Balkan Wars of 1912 and 1913.

Among his works were many poems, the theatrical work Mitroussis (Greek: Μητρούσης) and The Wild and the Day of the Mountains and the Hills (Greek: Τα άγρια και τα ήμερα του βουνού και του λόγγου), a book of stories from the folklore traditions of the area related to animals.

He died in Athens in 1915.
