= Michael Mavroudis =

Martyr from Granitsa

Michael Mavroudis (Greek: Μιχαήλ Μαυρουδῆς) was a martyr from Granitsa, who died in 1544.
