= Viniani =

Village in Evrytania, Greece

Viniani Βίνιανη
- Municipal unit
- Location within the regional unit

- Location within Greece
- Coordinates: 38°59′N 21°41′E
- Country: Greece
- Administrative region: Central Greece
- Regional unit: Evrytania
- Municipality: Agrafa

Area
  - Municipal unit: 152.729 km^{2} (58.969 sq mi)

Population (2021)
  - Municipal unit: 846
  - Municipal unit density: 5.54/km^{2} (14.3/sq mi)
  - Community: 127
- Time zone: UTC+2 (EET)
  - Summer (DST): UTC+3 (EEST)
- Vehicle registration: ΚΗ

Viniani (Greek: Βίνιανη) is a village and a former municipality in Evrytania, Greece. Since the 2011 local government reform, it has been part of the municipality of Agrafa, of which it is a municipal unit. The village was largely destroyed by an earthquake in 1966, leading most of its inhabitants to abandon it to establish the village of Nea Viniani 5 kilometres (3.1 mi) away. Hence the 2021 census recorded just 9 permanent residents in the original settlement, though the community of Viniani also includes the new village which has a population of 118. Furthermore, the municipal unit includes multiple nearby villages as well, adding up to a population of 846 and covering an area of 152.729 km^{2}.

== History ==
On 10 March 1944, during the Axis occupation of Greece in World War II, the Political Committee of National Liberation was established in Viniani, with the village’s school as its headquarters. This is also where the ELAS and EDES groups had set out for Operation Harling two years earlier, in 1942. That building is now a museum dedicated to the Greek resistance.

In February 1966, most of the village's inhabitants abandoned it after it was largely destroyed by an earthquake. They went on to establish a new one 5 kilometres (3.1 mi) away, naming it Nea (New) Viniani. This led to the original village nowadays being a tiny settlement of just 9 permanent residents.

== Administration ==
Since the 2011 local government reform, Viniani is a municipal unit of the municipality of Agrafa. Prior to that it used to be its own municipality. The former municipality and the contemporary municipal unit cover the exact same area of 152.729 km^{2}.

The municipal unit includes multiple nearby villages and is made up of six communities:

- Viniani
- Kerasochori
- Agios Dimitrios
- Dafni
- Mavromata
- Chryso

== See also ==
- Political Committee of National Liberation
