= Agrafa =

Mountainous region in mainland Greece

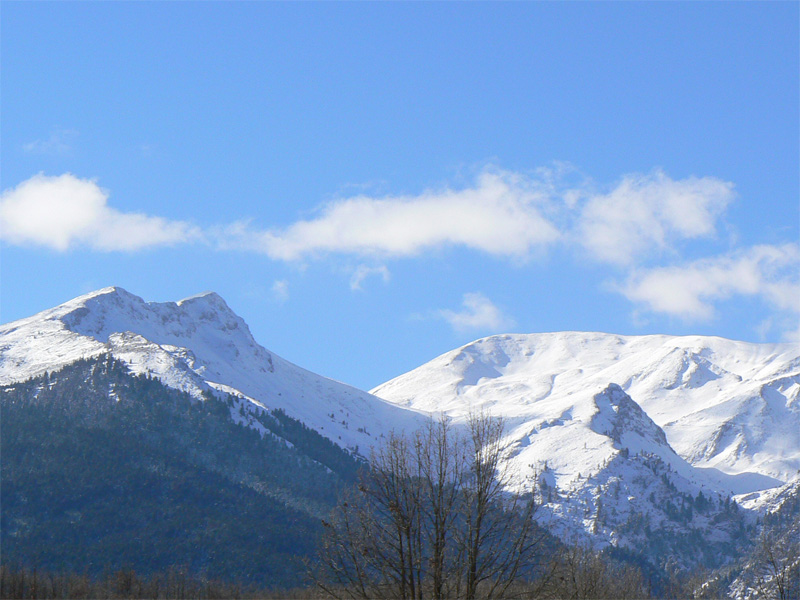
Agrafa mountains

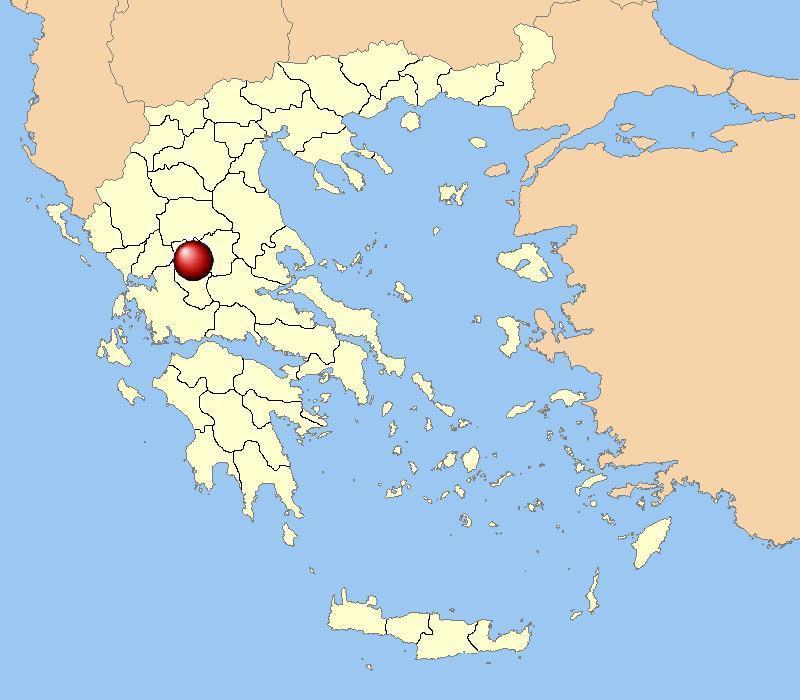
Locator of Agrafa mountains in Greece

Agrafa (Greek: Άγραφα, Greek pronunciation: [ˈaɣrafa]) is a mountainous region in Evrytania and Karditsa regional units in mainland Greece, consisting mainly of small villages. It is the southernmost part of the Pindus range. There is also a municipality with the same name, the Municipality of Agrafa, but it covers only a small percentage of the area.

== History ==
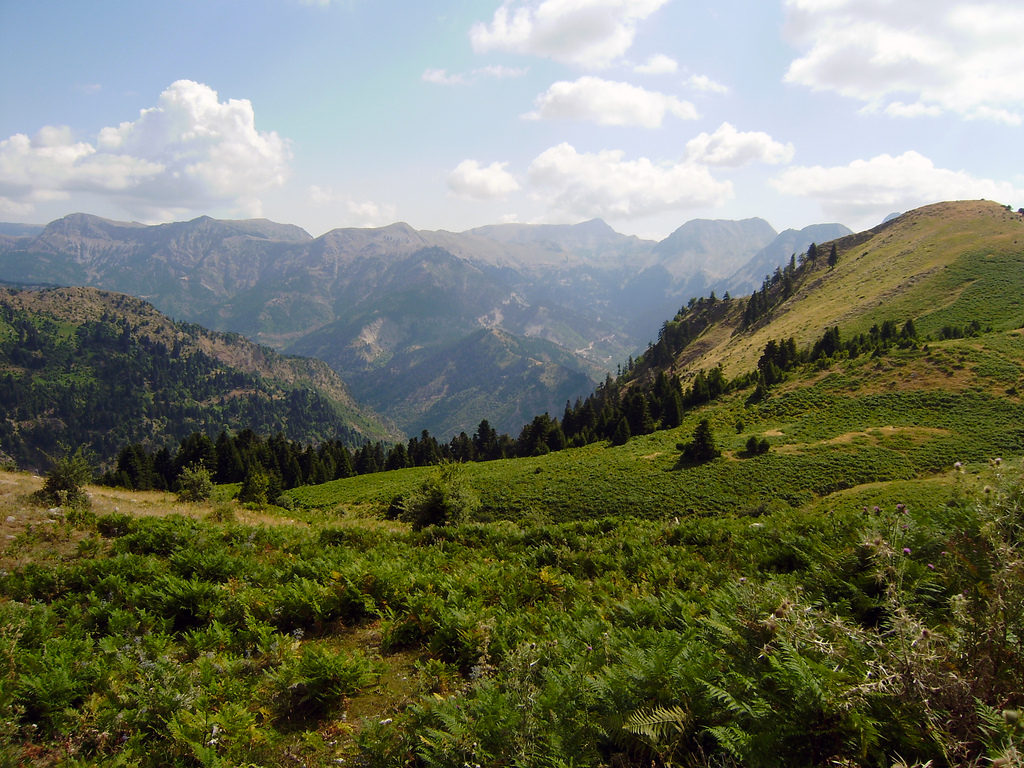
Spring in Agrafa

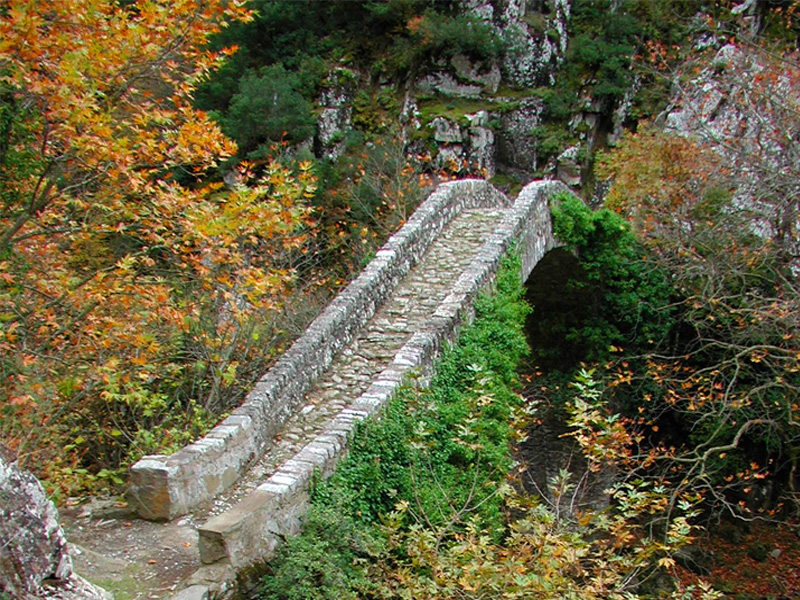
Bridge in Agrafa

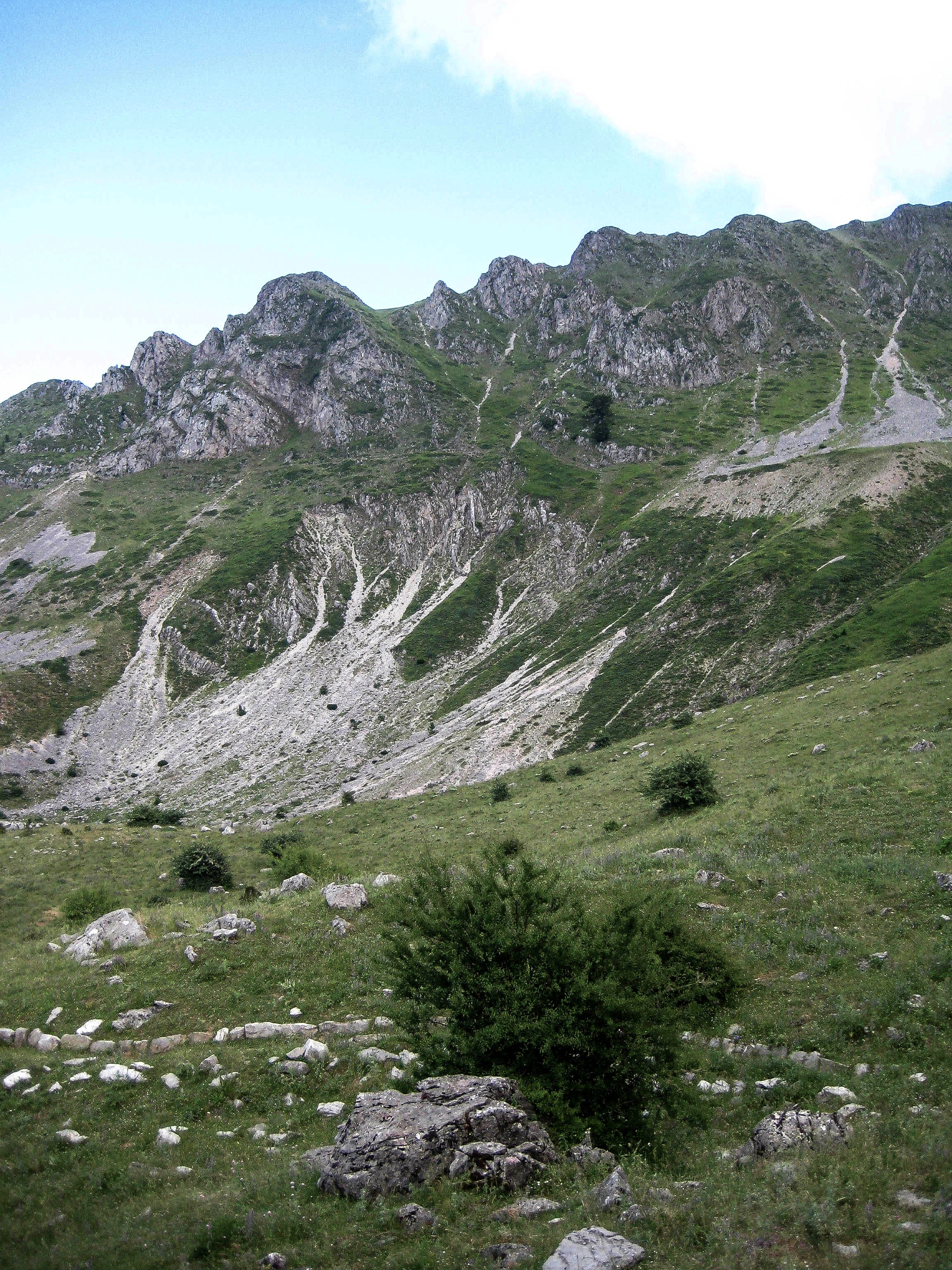
View

"Agrafa" in Greek means "unwritten", a reference to the region's remoteness and difficult terrain. As a result, the Ottomans were never able to successfully control the region. Agrafa maintained a form of self-governance and semi-independence, which included having its own militias and dispute arbitration systems. These privileges were recognized by the Ottomans in a treaty in 1525.

The fiercely independent spirit of its people, known as Agrafiotes, is matched by a harsh and forbidding landscape. The central Agrafiotis River valley is surrounded on three sides by a steep 2,000-metre wall of mountains, and on its south side the river drains via a series of narrow and often impassable gorges into the man-made Lake Kremasta. The other great river of Agrafa, Tavropos (aka Megdovas), feeds two man-made lakes: Plastiras (N) and Kremasta (S).

Most of the surrounding forests in the region were controlled by Greek Orthodox monasteries for many hundreds of years and through Ottoman rule. The residents of the Agrafa purchased tracts of land from the monasteries hundreds of years ago and these forests remain in the communal hands of the current inhabitants.

Agrafa served as a refuge for Greeks fleeing Ottoman rule and was a center of Greek literacy and culture during the 400 years of Ottoman rule. Unlike the majority of Greeks, many Agrafiotes can trace their family histories back for generations. In the 19th century, the area played a prominent role in the Greek War of Independence.

In the 20th century, a lot of Agrafiotes left their villages and settled in the major metropolitan cities in Greece as well as in the United States, Canada, Australia and Germany, seeking an escape from the abject poverty and lack of opportunities in the area. The migration from the region first began in the 1920s and nearly ceased after the military junta which had ruled Greece from 1967 to 1974 was toppled. The largest Agrafiot community outside of Greece is in Charlotte, North Carolina.

== Modernization ==
Before modernization, most people's occupations in the Agrafa involved harvesting nuts and fruits from orchards, farming, shepherding, and textile manufacturing. Most of the produce from the Agrafa are traditional cold weather crops or crops which can survive in poor soil. The proceeds of the timber sales from the forests purchased from the monasteries continue to benefit the community as a whole.

The most famous person from the Agrafa and the driving force behind modernization was the colonel Nikolaos Plastiras, who was elected prime minister of Greece after the Civil War. It was his vision to create a hydroelectric dam in the region so that nearly all of mainland Greece, excluding the Peloponnese, would be supplied with electricity, particularly the many fractured villages and rural communities. A spin-off from this project was the mass irrigation system developed to supply the farmers in the plains of Thessaly with water and increase the yields of cash crops, such as cotton, and also the creation of Lake Plastira which has met increasing tourist development in the last decades.

Construction began during the 1950s. The Plastiras Dam contributed to the economic development of Greece. The majority of the workers on this project were Agrafiotes themselves.
