= Fragkista =

Fragkista Φραγκίστα
- Municipal unit
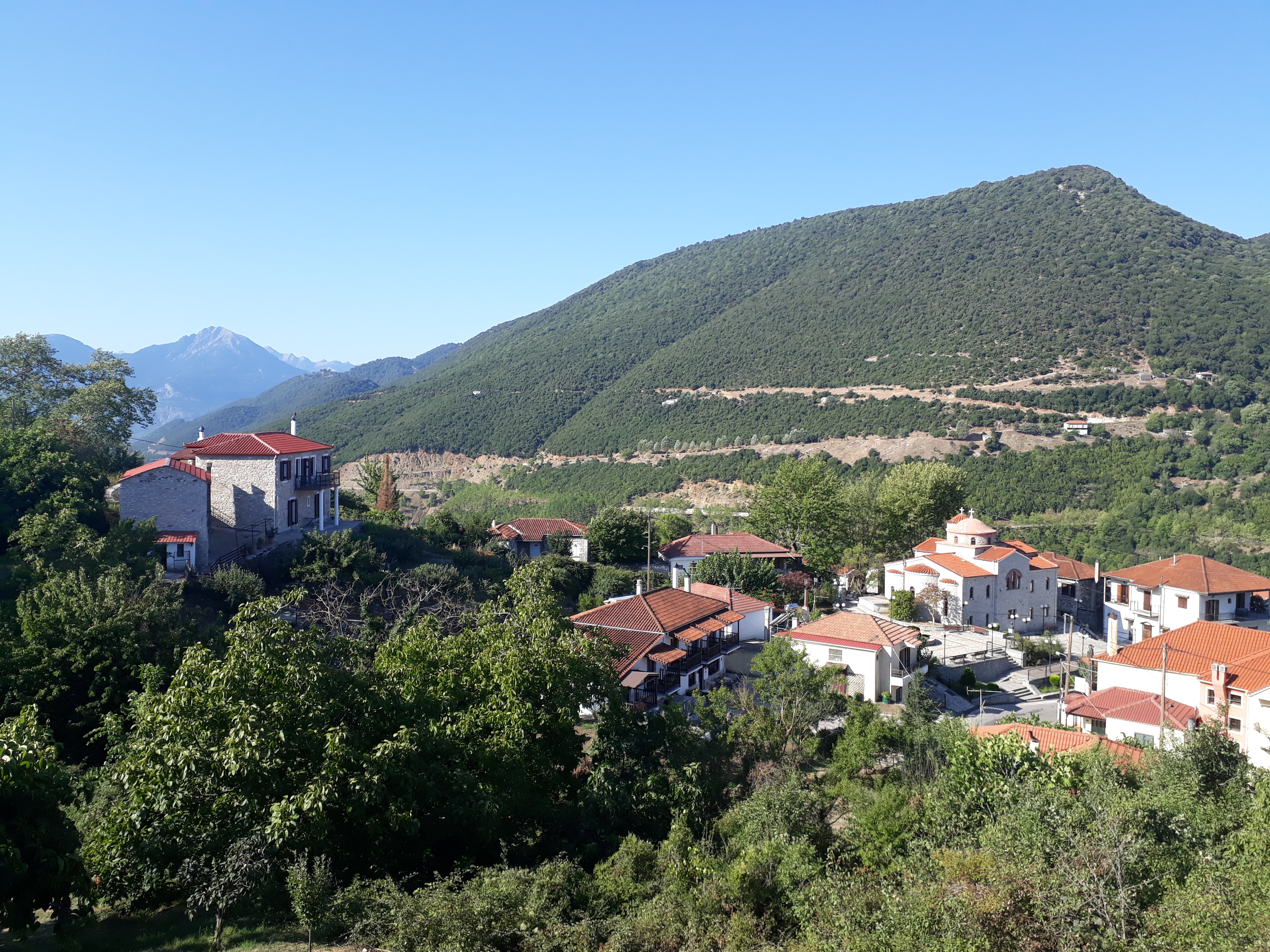
- View over Anatoliki Fragkista

- Location within the regional unit

- Location within Greece
- Coordinates: 38°57′N 21°35′E
- Country: Greece
- Administrative region: Central Greece
- Regional unit: Evrytania
- Municipality: Agrafa

Area
  - Municipal unit: 177.261 km^{2} (68.441 sq mi)

Population (2021)
  - Municipal unit: 1,267
  - Municipal unit density: 7.148/km^{2} (18.51/sq mi)
- Time zone: UTC+2 (EET)
  - Summer (DST): UTC+3 (EEST)
- Vehicle registration: ΚΗ

Fragkista (Greek: Φραγκίστα), pronounced in Greek Frangista, is a former municipality in Evrytania, Greece. Since the 2011 local government reform it is part of the municipality Agrafa, of which it is a municipal unit. The municipal unit has an area of 177.261 km^{2}. Population 1,267 (2021).

== Notable people ==
- Georgios Kafantaris (1873–1946), politician
