= Agrafa (municipality) =

Municipality in Evrytania, Greece

Agrafa Άγραφα
- Municipality
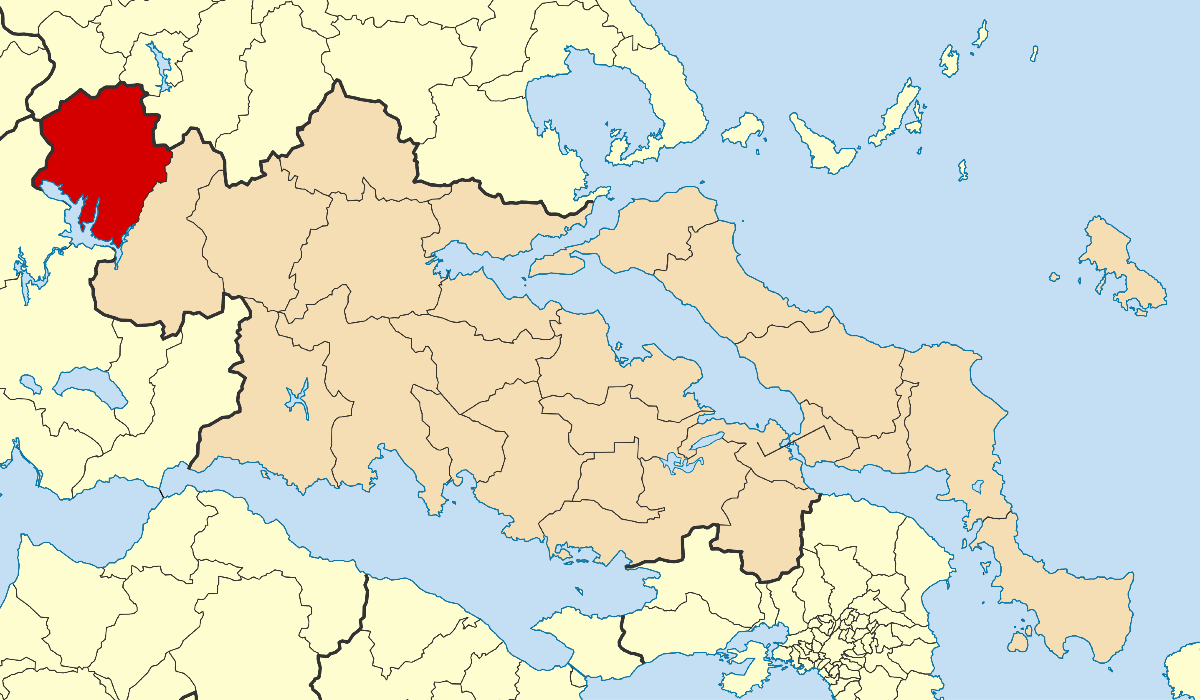

- Location within Greece
- Coordinates: 39°8′N 21°39′E
- Country: Greece
- Administrative region: Central Greece
- Regional unit: Evrytania
- Seat: Kerasochori

Area
  - Municipality: 920.3 km^{2} (355.3 sq mi)
  - Municipal unit: 28,826 km^{2} (11,130 sq mi)
- Elevation: 800 m (2,600 ft)

Population (2021)
  - Municipality: 5,983
  - Density: 6.501/km^{2} (16.84/sq mi)
  - Municipal unit: 1,044
  - Municipal unit density: 0.03622/km^{2} (0.09380/sq mi)
  - Community: 377
- Time zone: UTC+2 (EET)
  - Summer (DST): UTC+3 (EEST)
- Postal code: 360 73
- Area code: 22370
- Vehicle registration: ΚΗ

Agrafa (Greek: Άγραφα) is a village and a municipality in Evrytania, Central Greece. Its administrative center is the village Kerasochori. It is named after the wide mountainous region of Agrafa, of which it occupies only the SW part.

It consists of villages and hamlets spread on the mountain slopes around the river Agrafiotis. Like the rest of Agrafa area, they are known for their complete autonomy throughout the four centuries of Ottoman occupation of Greece, being home to many bands of fighters against the Ottoman rule; including Antonis Katsantonis who is considered as the local hero.

The villages are still undeveloped touristically. There are some basic facilities in the bigger villages - family-run hostels and taverns.

== Municipality ==
The municipality Agrafa was formed at the 2011 local government reform by the merger of the following 5 former municipalities, that became municipal units (constituent communities in brackets):

- Agrafa (Agrafa, Epiniana, Marathos, Monastiraki, Tridendro, Trovato, Vrangiana)
- Aperantia (Granitsa, Limeri, Lithochori, Sivista, Topoliana, Valaora, Voulpi)
- Aspropotamos (Kedra, Lepiana, Neo Argyri, Prasia, Raptopoulo)
- Fragkista (Anatoliki Fragkista, Dytiki Fragkista, Episkopi, Marathia, Palaiochori, Palaiokatouna, Tripotamo)
- Viniani (Agios Dimitrios, Chryso, Dafni, Kerasochori, Mavrommata, Viniani)

The municipality has an area of 920.341 km^{2}, the municipal unit 288.574 km^{2}.
