= Evrytania =

Evrytania Περιφερειακή ενότητα Ευρυτανίας
- Regional unit
- Municipalities of Evrytania

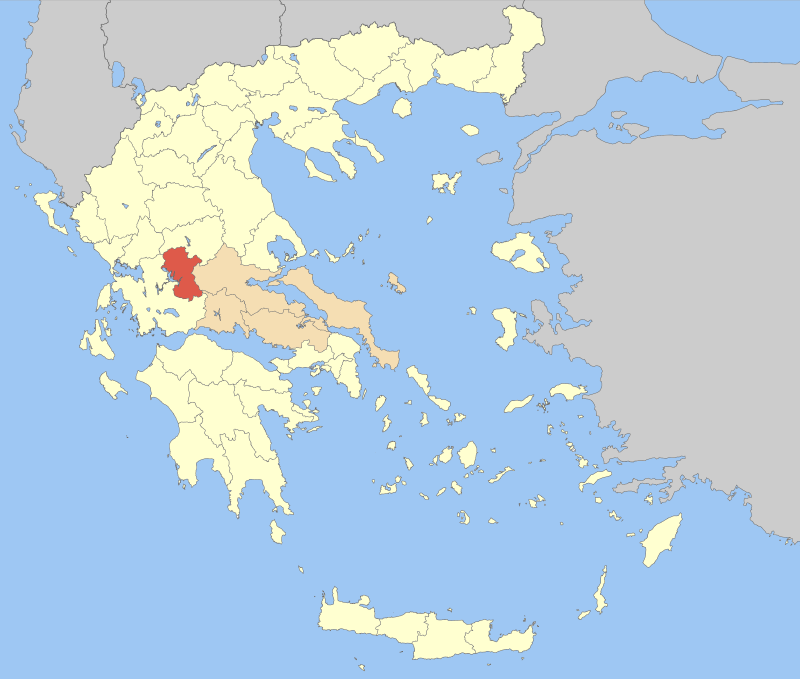
- Evrytania within Greece

- Location within Greece
- Coordinates: 39°0′N 21°40′E
- Country: Greece
- Administrative region: Central Greece
- Seat: Karpenisi

Area
  - Total: 1,868 km^{2} (721 sq mi)

Population (2021)
  - Total: 17,428
  - Density: 9.330/km^{2} (24.16/sq mi)
- Time zone: UTC+2 (EET)
  - Summer (DST): UTC+3 (EEST)
- Postal code: 36x xx
- Area code: 22370
- Vehicle registration: ΚΗ
- Website: www.evritania.gr

Evrytania (Greek: Ευρυτανία [evritaˈni.a]; Latin: Eurytania) is one of the regional units of Greece. It is part of the region of Central Greece. Its capital is Karpenisi (approx. 8,000 inhabitants).

== Geography ==
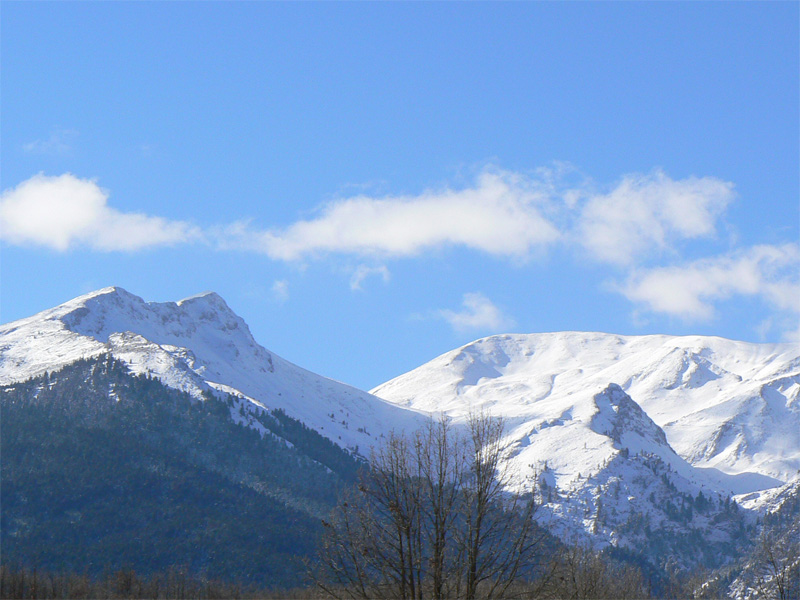
Agrafa

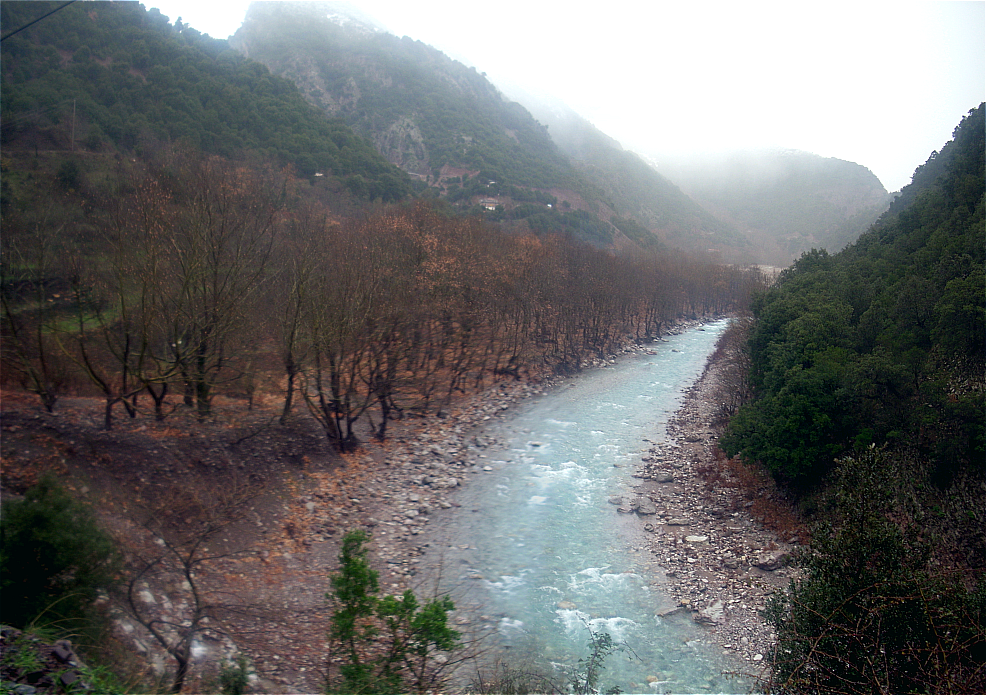
Agrafiotis river

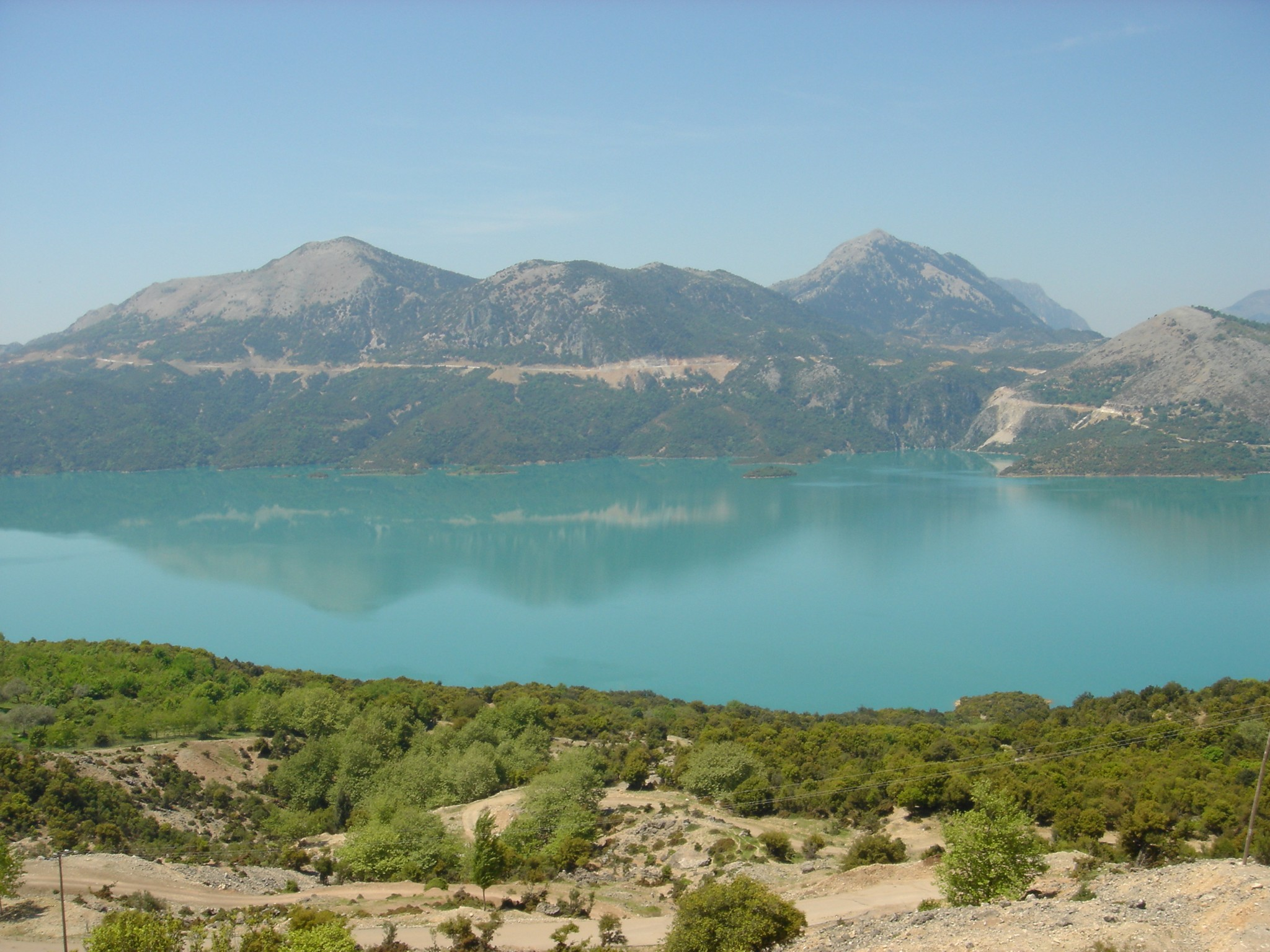
Kremasta (lake)

Evrytania is almost entirely formed of mountains, including the Tymfristos and the Panaitoliko in the south. Its rivers include the Acheloos in the west, Agrafiotis to the east, and Megdova in the east flowing down to the Ionian Sea. It is one of the least populated regional units in Greece. The area borders Aetolia-Acarnania to the west, southwest and south (west over the Acheloos river), Karditsa regional unit to the north, and Phthiotis to the east. Evrytania also features a famous skiing resort located near Karpenisi on the Tymfristos mountain.

=== Climate ===
Its climate is a mixture of Mediterranean and mountainous in the western portion. Much of the area receives snow in winter and is warm during the summer months.

=== Transport ===
The EO38, which runs between Agrinio/Thermo and Lamia, is the only national road in Evrytania: it passes through the middle of the regional unit, via the town of Karpenisi. On the border with Phthiotis, the EO38 passes through the 1.4 km-long Tymfristos Tunnel since 2004.

== History ==
Evrytania dates to ancient times, the area was first settled around 6000 to 5000 BC. In classical antiquity, the Aetolian tribe of Eurytanes (Greek: Ευρυτάνες) resided in the region. In the 2nd century BC Evrytania and the rest of the Aetolian League fell into Roman hands. After the final division of the Roman Empire in the 4th century, it remained part of the Byzantine Empire. In the aftermath of the Fourth Crusade in 1204 it became part of the Despotate of Epirus.

It was conquered by the Ottoman Empire in the 15th century. Unlike other parts of Greece at the time, while the eastern and the southern parts were definitively ruled by the Ottomans, the area around Agrafa managed to sustain complete autonomy due to the difficulties experienced in conquest of the region and was the homeland of famous klephts, like Katsantonis. In early 19th century, Evrytania, as the rest of Central Greece, became part of the kingdom of Greece after the Greek War of Independence. As the rest of Greece, the area was affected by World War II, taking part in the Greek resistance, and later by the Greek Civil War. Peace returned to Evrytania at the end of the 1940s and its economy expanded, though there was significant migration from the villages to cities.

== Administration ==
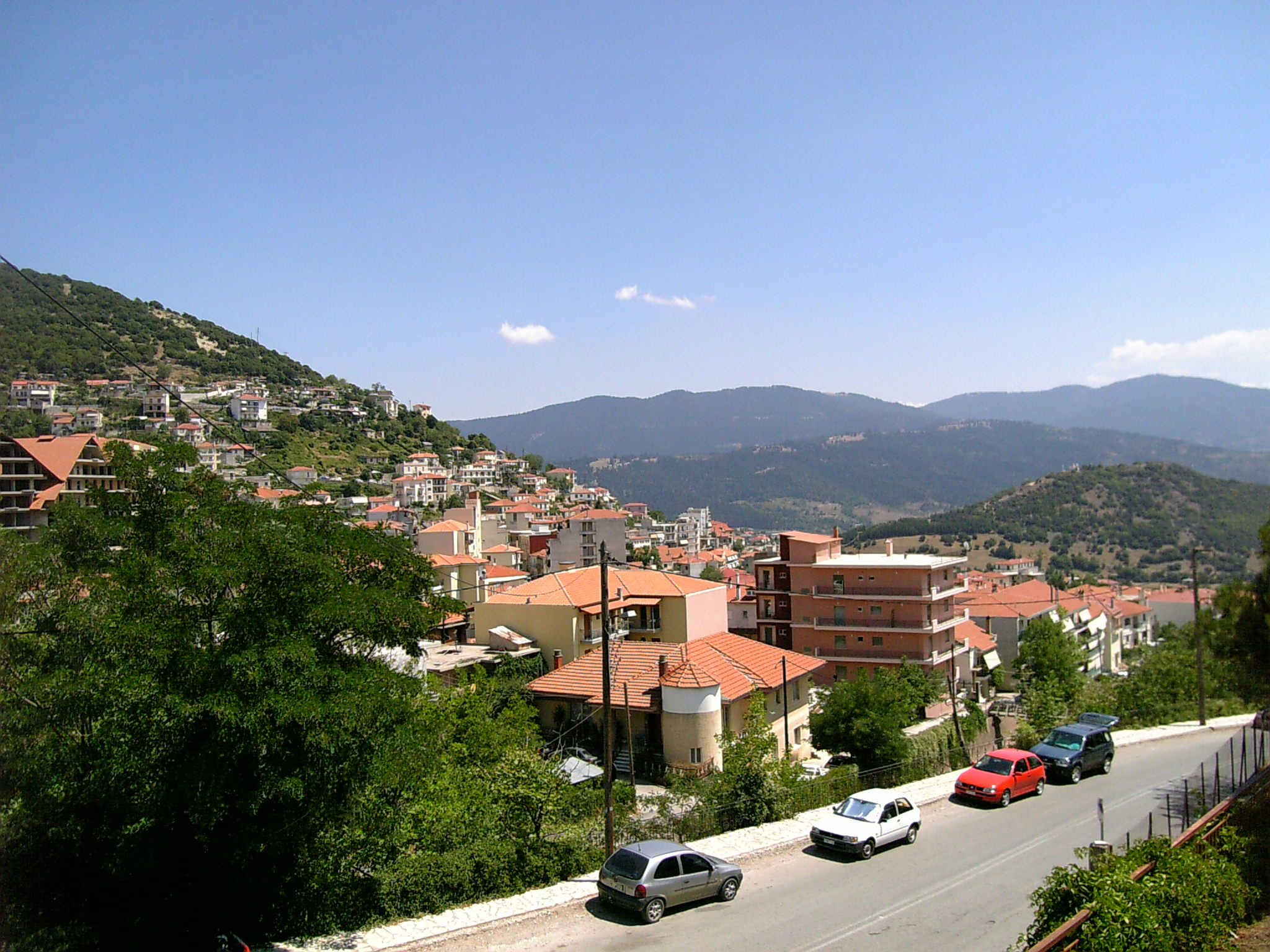
Karpenisi

The regional unit Evrytania is subdivided into 2 municipalities. These are (number as in the map in the infobox):

- Agrafa (2)
- Karpenisi (1)

=== Prefecture ===
Evrytania was created as a prefecture in 1947 out of the Aetolia-Acarnania prefecture. As a part of the 2011 Kallikratis government reform, the regional unit Evrytania was created out of the former prefecture Evrytania (Greek: Νομός Ευρυτανίας). The prefecture had the same territory as the present regional unit. At the same time, the municipalities were reorganised, according to the table below.

New municipality	Old municipalities	Seat
Agrafa	Agrafa	Kerasochori
Agrafa	Aperantia	Kerasochori
Agrafa	Aspropotamos	Kerasochori
Agrafa	Viniani	Kerasochori
Agrafa	Fragkista	Kerasochori
Karpenisi	Karpenisi	Karpenisi
Karpenisi	Domnista	Karpenisi
Karpenisi	Fourna	Karpenisi
Karpenisi	Ktimenia	Karpenisi
Karpenisi	Potamia	Karpenisi
Karpenisi	Prousos	Karpenisi

== Notable people ==
- Pavlos Bakoyannis (1935-1989), Liberal Greek politician
- Markos Giolias, artist
- Demosthenis Goulas, artist
- Stefanos Granitsas (1880-1915), artist, writer and journalist
- Georgios Kafantaris (1873-1946), politician
- Spyros Paliouras (1875-1957), a Greek artist and writer
- Zacharias Papantoniou (1877-1940), artist, writer and journalist
- Michael Stafylas (1920-2018), artist
- Lefteris Theodorou, painter
- Spyridon Papadimitriou, Greek Army General
- Georgios Kondylis, Prime Minister of Greece

== See also ==
- List of settlements in Evrytania
- Evrytania (constituency)
