= Panaitoliko (mountain range) =

Mountain range in Greece

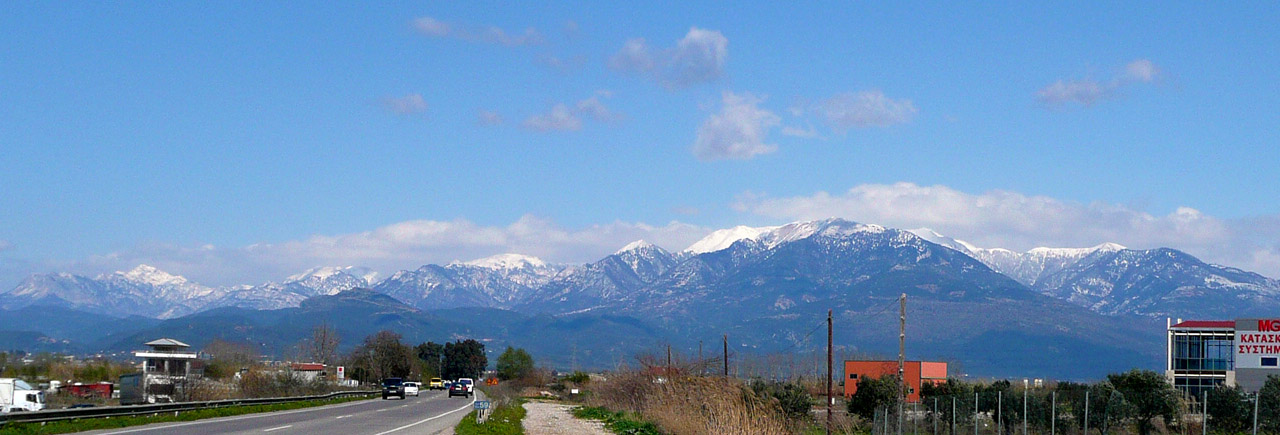
- Panaitoliko Mountains

Highest point
- Elevation: 1,924 m (6,312 ft)
- Coordinates: 38°41′35″N 21°34′30″E

Naming
- Pronunciation: Greek: [panetoliˈko]

Geography
- Location within Greece
- Location: northeastern Aetolia-Acarnania and southern Evrytania, Greece

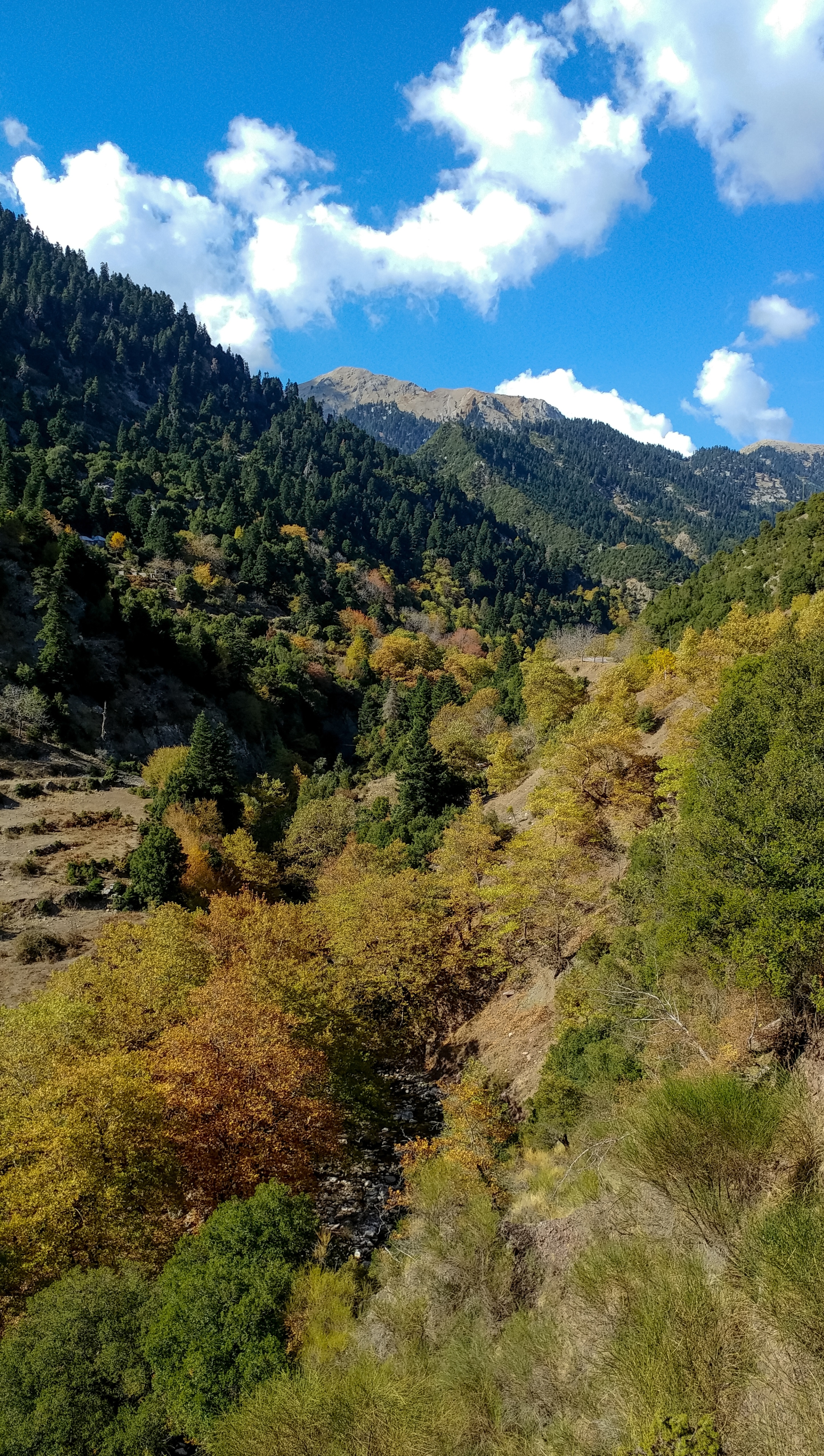
Panaitoliko Mt.

Panaitoliko (Greek: Παναιτωλικό) is a mountain range in the northeastern part of Aetolia-Acarnania and southwestern Evrytania, in western Greece. Its highest summit, Katelanos (Greek: Κατελάνος), is the highest point of Aetolia-Acarnania at 1,924 m. Its length is approximately 25 km long from east to west and its width is approximately 15 km wide. The nearest mountains are Kaliakouda to the northeast, the Nafpaktia Mountains to the southeast and Valtos to the northwest. Lake Trichonida lies to the south. The Panaitoliko extends from the Acheloos valley in the northwest to the Evinos valley in the east. There are forests in the lower areas, and grasslands in the higher elevations.

The municipal unit of Panaitoliko took its name from this mountain range. Villages near the Panaitoliko include Prousos in the north, Mesokomi in the northeast, Amvrakia in the southeast, Skoutera in the southwest, Agios Vlasios in the northwest and Klepa in the east
