= Kravara =

Mountainous region in Greece

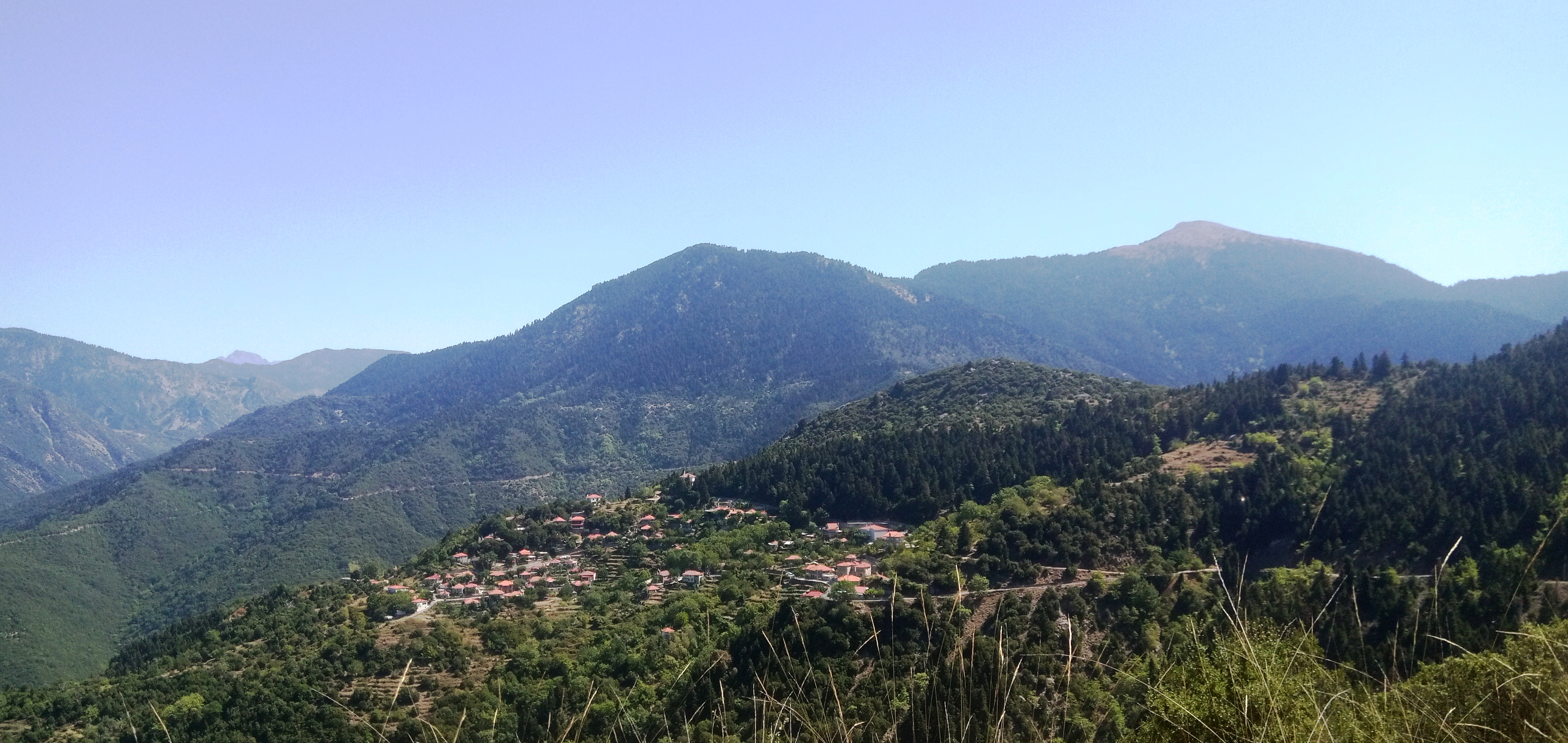
Тhe Kravara

Kravara (Greek: Κράβαρα) is a historical socio-cultural mountain region in Aetolia-Acarnania, central Greece. It covers the northernmost part of the Nafpaktia Mountains, as well as parts of Thermo.

The name appears for the first time in Ottoman times, as the Land of Kravari (Ottoman Turkish: Kravari Ili), part of the Sanjak of Tirhala, in a cadaster dated to 1454/55.

To the west of Kravara is the historical region of Apokouros in Panaitoliko, coinciding with the modern municipality of Thermo, and further west the Acarnanian Mountains. The whole region was medieval Little Wallachia.

The Varnakova monastery, sieged in the Greek War of Independence, is located in Kravara.

== Culture ==
As per the traditions of Kravarite, the mulberry trees found in Perista were planted by Jews in the 17th century.
