= Athanasios Dimitrakopoulos =

Greek politician (1936–2022)

- Αθανάσιος Δημητρακόπουλος

Member of the Hellenic Parliament for Aetolia–Acarnania
- In office 18 October 1981 – 24 August 1996

Personal details
- Born: 14 May 1936 Platanos, Aetolia-Acarnania, Greece
- Died: 8 July 2022 (aged 86)
- Party: PASOK
- Children: 2

Athanasios Dimitrakopoulos (Note: Also referred to as Thanasis Dimitrakopoulos) (Greek: Αθανάσιος Δημητρακόπουλος; 14 May 1936 – 8 July 2022) was a Greek lawyer and politician who served in the Hellenic Parliament from 1981 until 1996, representing Aetolia–Acarnania as a member of the Panhellenic Socialist Movement.

Dimitrakopoulos was born in the town of Platanos, Aetolia-Acarnania in the Kingdom of Greece. He studied law in Athens. Dimitrakopoulos was first elected to the Hellenic Parliament in the 1981 Greek legislative election, and he was re-elected in 1985, June 1989, November 1989, 1990, and 1993. From September 1987 until June 1988, Dimitrakopoulos was a deputy minister in Parliament. He later served as the president of the Hellenic Post.

Dimitrakopoulos was married and had two children. He died on 8 July 2022, at the age of 86.
