= Katafygio =

Katafygio Καταφύγιο
- Community
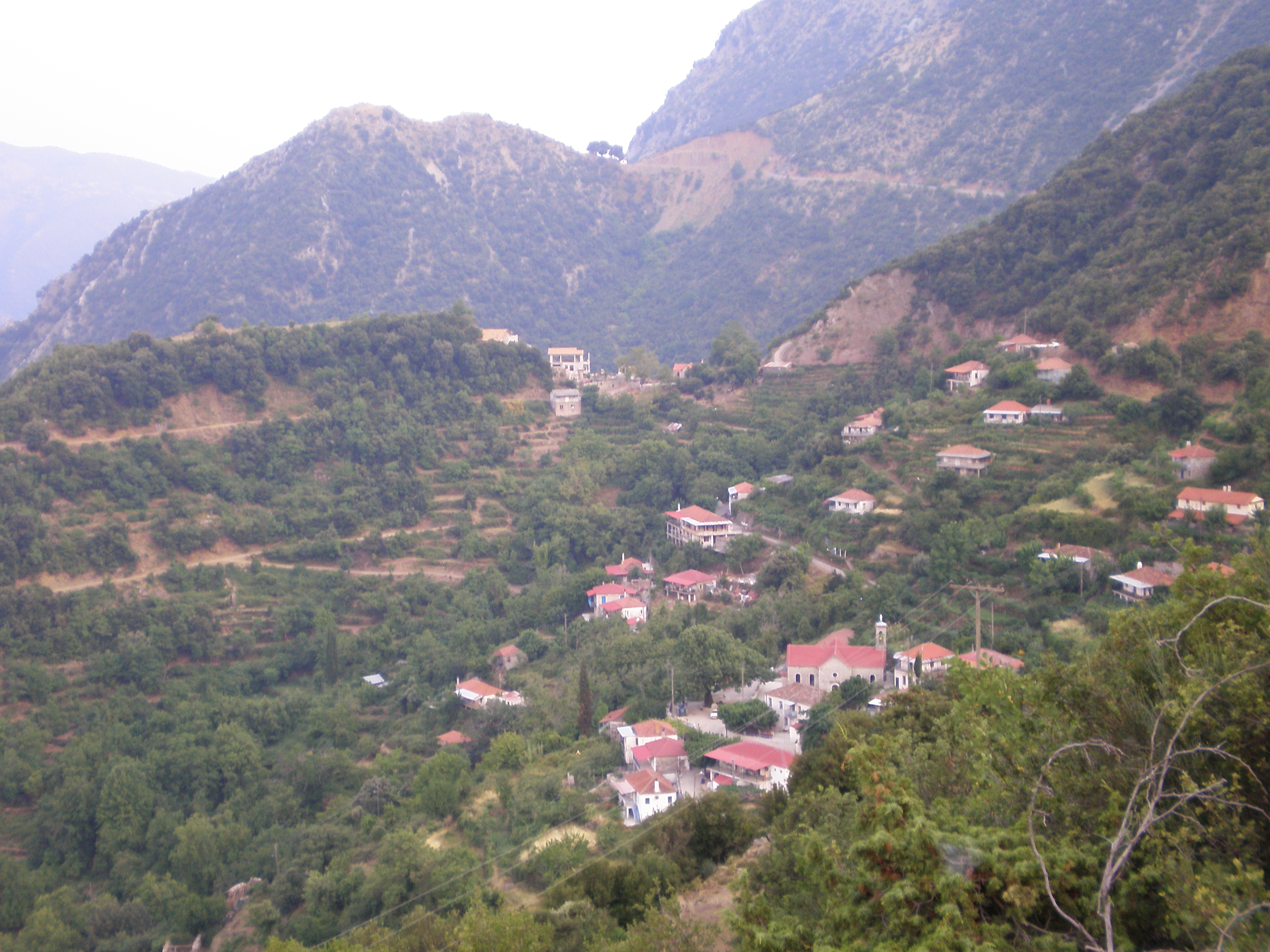

- Location within Greece
- Coordinates: 38°31′N 21°55′E
- Country: Greece
- Administrative region: West Greece
- Regional unit: Aetolia-Acarnania
- Municipality: Nafpaktia
- Municipal unit: Apodotia

Area
  - Community: 23.429 km^{2} (9.046 sq mi)
- Elevation: 650 m (2,130 ft)

Population (2021)
  - Community: 130
  - Density: 5.5/km^{2} (14/sq mi)
- Time zone: UTC+2 (EET)
  - Summer (DST): UTC+3 (EEST)
- Postal code: 30300
- Area code: 26340
- Website: www.katafigionafpaktias.gr

Katafygio (Greek: Καταφύγιο, meaning refuge, shelter, lodge) is a village in Aetolia-Acarnania in Greece at an altitude of 620 metres in the eastern foothills of Makrynoros. It borders the villages of Anavriti to the north, Kentriki and Aspria to the northeast, Chrysovo to the southeast, Gavros to the northwest and Anthofyto to the southwest. It is about 33 kilometres from Nafpaktos on a tarmac road.

The village is surrounded by 2 hills on the summits of which are the small churches of St Konstantinos and St Athanasios. The land is prone to subsidence and landslip. In 1878, 25 buildings disappeared because of subsidence. The houses and the fields are strengthened with low walls (demata) in order to stabilise the ground.

In the centre of village is the square and the church of Koimiseos of Theotokou.

== History ==
The old name of the village was Amorani. In 1928, it was renamed Katafygio because under Ottoman occupation the village was a refuge, with many caverns, and rocky and steep terrain making it hard to reach.

It was in existence by 1550–1575, at which time we find it registered in Turkish tax documents in the region of Kravara.

Under Ottoman domination it was one of the main villages of the region. Around 1700 families of cattle-breeders moved to the western side of the Makrynoro mountain and created a small settlement, named Golemi. This historical relationship renders Golemi an integral part of Katafygio. Administratively, Katafygio from 1836 until 1912 belonged to the municipality of Apodotia. With the royal decree on 31 August 1912 (261/Α/1912) it was recognized as the community of Amorani. It was renamed Katafygio by the decree of 9 September 1927 (206/A/1927). Golemi is part of the community.

With the application of the Kapodistrias reform it became the Municipal District of Katafygio, in the Municipality of Apodotia in Aetolia-Acarnania, which became part of the municipality Nafpaktia in 2011. It occupies 23.429 km^{2} (9.046 sq mi). Historically the residents lived by livestock farming, which is still practiced.

== Historical population of Katafygio community ==
Year	Population
1907	678 residents
1920	613
1928	629
1940	757
1951	743
1961	652
1971	350
1981	300
1991	340
2001	256
2011	322
2021	130
