= Evinochori =

Evinochori Ευηνοχώρι
- Community
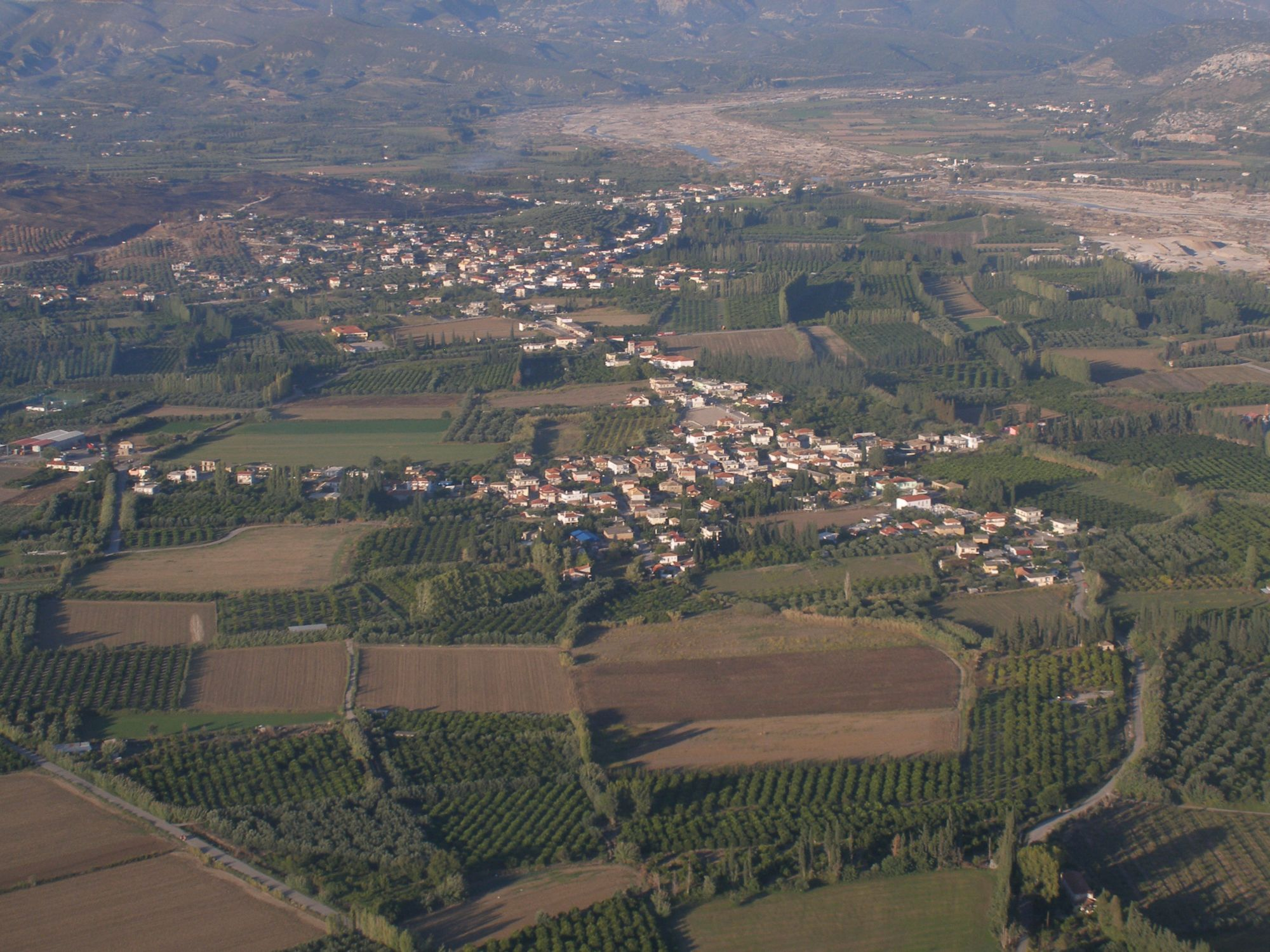

- Location within Greece
- Coordinates: 38°22′N 21°32′E
- Country: Greece
- Administrative region: West Greece
- Regional unit: Aetolia-Acarnania
- Municipality: Missolonghi
- Municipal unit: Missolonghi

Population (2021)
  - Community: 1,456
- Time zone: UTC+2 (EET)
  - Summer (DST): UTC+3 (EEST)
- Vehicle registration: ΜΕ

Evinochori (Greek: Ευηνοχώρι) is a village and a community in the southern part of Aetolia-Acarnania, Greece. Evinochori is in the municipality of Missolonghi, located 10 km east of Missolonghi town centre. It is situated on the right bank of the river Evinos, about 10 km north of its outflow into the Ionian Sea. The community includes the village Nea Kalydona. Near Evinochori are the ruins of ancient Calydon, one of the most famous ancient cities in Aetolia.

The Greek National Road 5 (Antirrio - Agrinio - Ioannina) passes through the northern part of the village. The A5 motorway (E55), which opened in 2017, passes north of the village.

== History ==
The ancient city of Calydon is located a bit north of modern Evinochori.

The settlement, in Byzantine and Ottoman times, was known as Bochori (Μποχώρι), a name which is still commonly used today by the local population. It was also mentioned as Bochor or Bohor in several maps, including that from 1668 by Turkish traveller Evliya Çelebi. It was an important centre where wine and grapes were produced.

Part of the municipality of Missolonghi since Greek independence, Evinochori became an independent community in 1912. In 1997, it joined the municipality of Missolonghi again under the Kapodistrias reform.

=== Population history ===
Year	Village	Community
1981	1,840	-
1991	1,978	-
2001	1,683	1,706
2011	1,651	1,664
2021	1,451	1,456

== See also ==
- List of settlements in Aetolia-Acarnania
