= Papadates, Aetolia-Acarnania =

Papadates Παπαδάτες
- Community
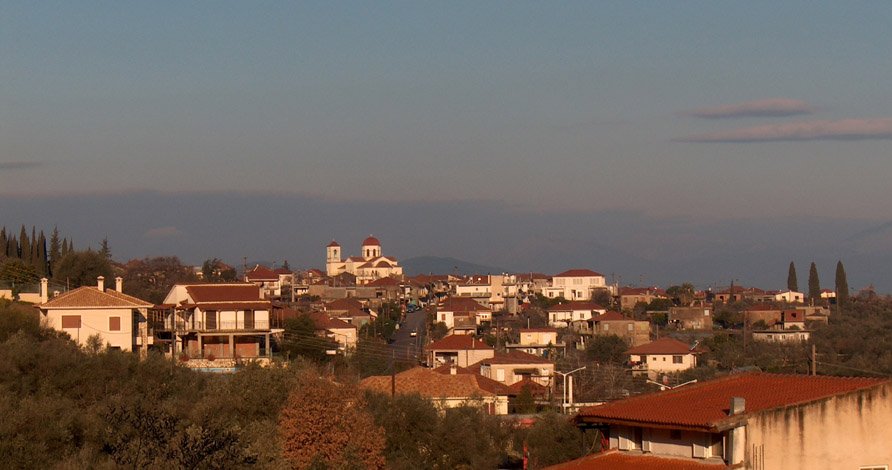
- Papadates

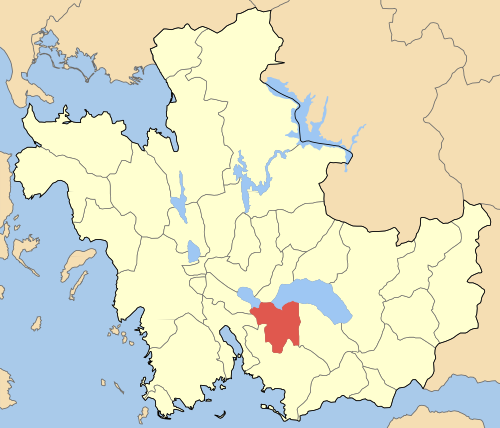
- Location within the regional unit

- Location within Greece
- Coordinates: 38°29′N 21°27′E
- Country: Greece
- Administrative region: West Greece
- Regional unit: Aetolia-Acarnania
- Municipality: Agrinio
- Municipal unit: Arakynthos

Area
  - Community: 12.235 km^{2} (4.724 sq mi)

Population (2021)
  - Community: 824
  - Density: 67.3/km^{2} (174/sq mi)
- Time zone: UTC+2 (EET)
  - Summer (DST): UTC+3 (EEST)
- Postal code: 300 11
- Area code: 26350

Papadates (Greek: Παπαδάτες or Παππαδάτες) is a village in the regional unit of Aetolia-Acarnania. Situated in the region of West Greece, since 2011, it is part of the municipality of Agrinio.

Papadates is located 12 km from the city of Agrinio, on the foothills of Arakynthos mountain and is one of the villages surrounding Lake Trichonida, the biggest Greek natural lake. It borders with the villages of Zevgaraki to the west and Mataranga to the east. It was the capital of the former municipality of Arakynthos.

The village has a population of 824 people (2021) and a land area of 12.235 km².

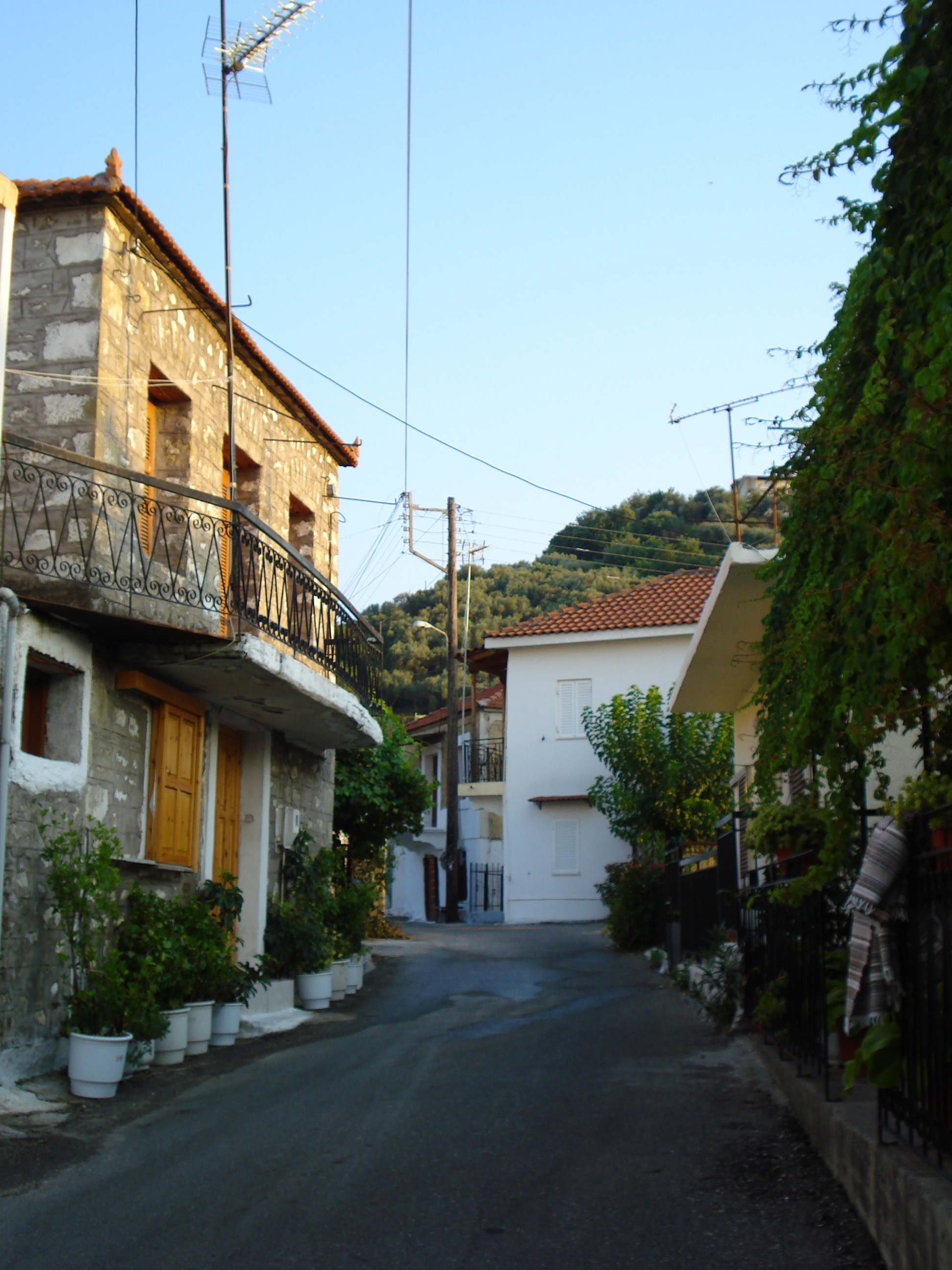
Papadates

== See also ==
List of settlements in Aetolia-Acarnania
