= Phyteum =

Coordinates: 38°29′25″N 21°36′46″E

Phyteum or Phyteon (Ancient Greek: Φύτεον), also known on as Phytaeum or Phytaion (Φύταιον), was a town of ancient Aetolia, probably on the northern shore of the Lake Trichonis.

Its site is tentatively located near the modern Palaiokhori.
