= Maria Dimadi =

Member of the EAM during the Axis occupation of Greece

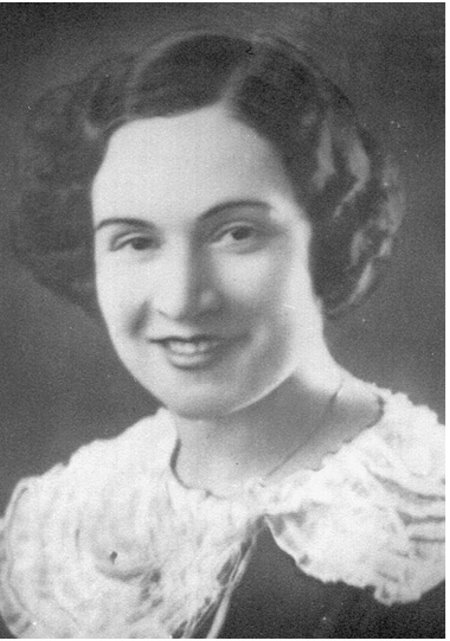
- Born: 1907; Agrinio
- Died: 31 August 1944 (aged 36–37); Agrinio
- Cause of death: Execution by firing squad
- Known for: Greek resistance spy
- Spouse: Theodoros Boukogiannis
- Children: 1

Maria Dimadi (Greek: Μαρία Δημάδη; 1907 – 31 August 1944) was a member of the National Liberation Front (EAM) during the Axis occupation of Greece. She acted as a spy for the resistance at the German garrison of Agrinio, providing crucial information on German maneuvers and undermining the Axis war effort. Dimadi was executed by Greek collaborationists on 31 August 1944.

== Early life ==
Maria Dimadi was born in 1907 in Agrinio, Kingdom of Greece. Her father was gynecologist Konstantinos Dimadis, her mother was a daughter of a tobacco merchant. Dimadi was raised by several governesses, studying foreign languages, learning to play the piano, painting and writing poetry for the periodical "Diaplasi ton Paidon". She went on to study philology in Hamburg, Germany. In 1926, she married judge Theodoros Boukogiannis, later giving birth to a daughter named Charikleia. The marriage soon collapsed and Boukogiannis moved out of Agrinio with his daughter. Charikleia was raised by her stepmother and was told that her mother had died. The divorce took a big psychological toll on Dimadi and she was only able to reunite with her daughter when the latter turned 16. In the late 1930s Dimadi caught typhus while spending a holiday in Agios Vlasios. The disease left a big scar on her face as a result of a gangrenous sore. She traveled to Germany with the help of her maternal uncle who operated a tobacco exporting corporation in the country. There she underwent plastic surgery to remove the scar, while also becoming fluent in German.

== Resistance ==
With the outbreak of the Greco-Italian War, Dimadi organized knitting circles of Agriniot women who sent clothes to the Greek Army. She also volunteered as a nurse at a local hospital. Following the Axis occupation of Greece, her neighbor Konstantinos Kazantzis and her cousin Dimitrios Panopoulos convinced her to join the National Liberation Front (EAM) resistance organization. Her villa in Platanos was used to host the first congress of EAM in the region. She was also the first woman to join National Solidarity (EAM's social welfare branch) in Aetolia-Acarnania.

In 1941, she applied for the translator position at Agrinio's German garrison, intending to infiltrate it. Upon being hired, Dimadi began making copies of confidential documents on German troop movements, destroying pieces of evidence on resistance activities as well as eavesdropping on conversations and phone calls. She smuggled the documents through gas station employee Ioannis Giannoutsos and priest Konstantinos Papavalis, whom she presented as her uncle. Giannoutsos created a cache for the documents at his workplace. Dimadi also convinced the commandant of the garrison to help collect 50,000 okades of corn, olive oil and wheat for the region's poor. In reality only 10,000 okades were sent to paupers, with the rest going to the Greek People's Liberation Army (ELAS). Dimadi forewarned ELAS about a large scale German clearance operation aiming at destroying the Political Committee of National Liberation in Evrytania, allowing ELAS to fight a series of delaying battles on favorable terms.

On 7 July 1943, the Agrinio EAM cell transferred a message by Dimadi to the ELAS band based at Agios Vlasios. Dimadi provided details about a German plan to establish a military base at Thermos, including the strength of the German force and its weaponry. At 8 a.m., on 10 July, a 120-man German column was ambushed by ELAS outside of Myrtia. In the ensuing Battle of Myrtia, the German column was dispersed. ELAS estimated German losses at 117 killed and 2 captured, while German archival documents put German deaths at fewer than 25. The ELAS General Command was congratulated by British Field Marshal Henry Maitland Wilson, while the outcome of the battle was also reported by Radio Cairo and Radio Moscow. On 31 August 1944, Dimadi was arrested at her home by Security Battalions personnel, she was then executed by firing squad in front of the Agia Triada cemetery, Agrinio. EAM blamed Dimadi's death on Security Battalions Major Toliopoulos, who feared that Dimadi would provide evidence of his systematic torture of suspected resistance members upon the country's liberation. Her executioners did not face trial after the end of Axis occupation.

== Legacy ==
In 1987, the Hellenic Broadcasting Corporation released "Maria Dimadi", an eight episode TV series based on the fictionalized account of Dimadi's activities written by F. Geladopoulos. On 10 December 2006, a new square named after Dimadi was unveiled at Skaltsodimos street, Agrinio.
