= Papadates =

Papadates or Pappadates may refer to several places in Greece:

- Papadates, Aetolia-Acarnania, a village in Aetolia-Acarnania
- Pappadates, Preveza, a village in the municipality of Ziros, Preveza regional unit
