= Siege of Varnakova =

Military engagement in 1826 during the Greek Revolution

- Part of the Greek War of Independence
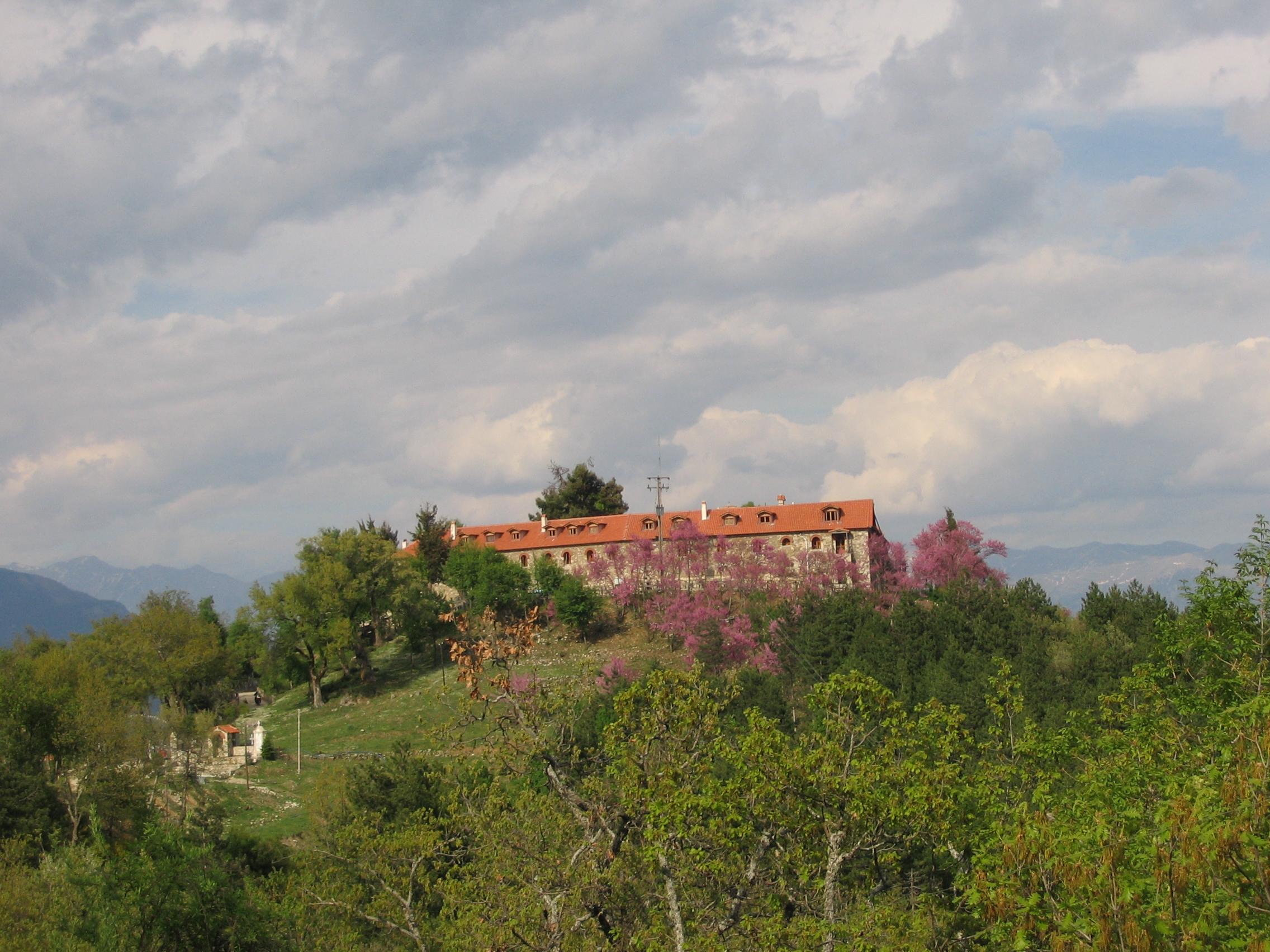
- The Panagia Varnakova Monastery
Date	20 – 26 May 1826 (6 days)
Location	Panagia Varnakova Monastery, Phocis, Rumelia Eyalet, Ottoman Empire
Result	Greek retreat, blowing up of the Monastery by the Turks

Belligerents
Greek revolutionaries	Ottoman Empire

Commanders and leaders
Ioannis Fraggistas; Kalyvas	Mustabey; Kehayabey

Strength
150	4,000

The siege of Varnakova in 1826 was one of the military episodes of the Greek War of Independence.

== The development of the siege ==
After the Exodus of Missolonghi, in April 1826, Georgios Karaiskakis, although ill, put up resistance as much as he could in the area, sending detachments of revolutionaries to timely positions against the Kütahı pass. Thus, he sent 150 selected men, led by the hoplitarchs Ioannis Fragistas, Triantafyllos (Apokouritis) and Kastaniotis, to the Monastery of Panagia Varnakova. In response, Kütahı sent the perionem Mustabey and Kehayabey with many Turk-Albanians (a force of 4,000 men is reported). The Turks' aim was to capture the Monastery (where Greeks had also taken refuge after the Exodus of Missolonghi) and to establish a garrison.

The siege began at dawn on 20 May 1826.

At the end of the siege the Turks placed dynamite in the underground galleries and blew up the monastery, which was rebuilt after 5 years, in 1831, by Ioannis Kapodistrias, who is considered the second founder of the Monastery.

== Sources ==
- Γεώργιος Π. Κρέμος (1839-1926) (1890). Νεωτάτη Γενική Ιστορία. Εν Αθήναις: Παρά τω εκδότη Σ. Κ. Βλαστώ. pp. 906.
