= Lake Trichonida =

Lake in Aetolia-Acarnania, Greece

- Λίμνη Τριχωνίδα (Greek)
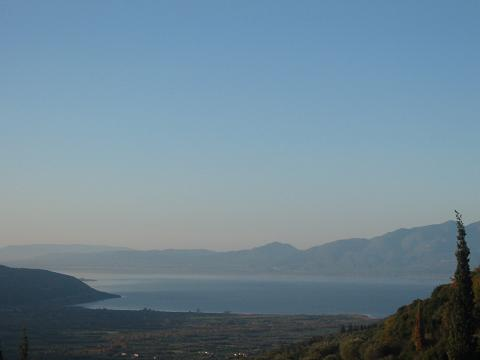

- Location within Greece
- Location: Aetolia-Acarnania
- Coordinates: 38°34′21″N 21°33′09″E
- Lake type: natural
- Basin countries: Greece
- Max. length: 19 km (12 mi)
- Surface area: 98.6 km^{2} (38.1 sq mi)
- Max. depth: 58 m (190 ft)
- Water volume: 2.868 km^{3} (0.688 cu mi)
- Surface elevation: 15 m (49 ft)
- Islands: none
- Settlements: Paravola

Lake Trichonida (Greek: Λίμνη Τριχωνίδα Limni Trichonida; Ancient Greek: Τριχωνίς Trichonis) is the largest natural lake in Greece. It is situated in the eastern part of Aetolia-Acarnania, southeast of the city of Agrinio and northwest of Nafpaktos. It covers an area of 98.6 square kilometres (38.1 mi^{2}) with a maximum length of 19 kilometres (12 mi). Its surface elevation is 15 metres (49 ft) and its maximum depth is 58 metres (190 ft).

One million years ago the lake was much larger and covered the central part of Aetolia-Acarnania, a part that is now a plain. The Panaitoliko mountains are situated to the north and northeast of the lake. The municipal units surrounding the lake are (from the east and clockwise) Thermo, Makryneia, Arakynthos, Thestieis, and Paravola. Around the lake, there are beautiful forests with maples, pines, and other trees. The lake and its environs are home to more than 200 bird species. There are also farmland and various villages surrounding the area. The hydrocarbon lake Trichonida Lacus on the Saturnian moon Titan was named after this lake.

== Gallery ==
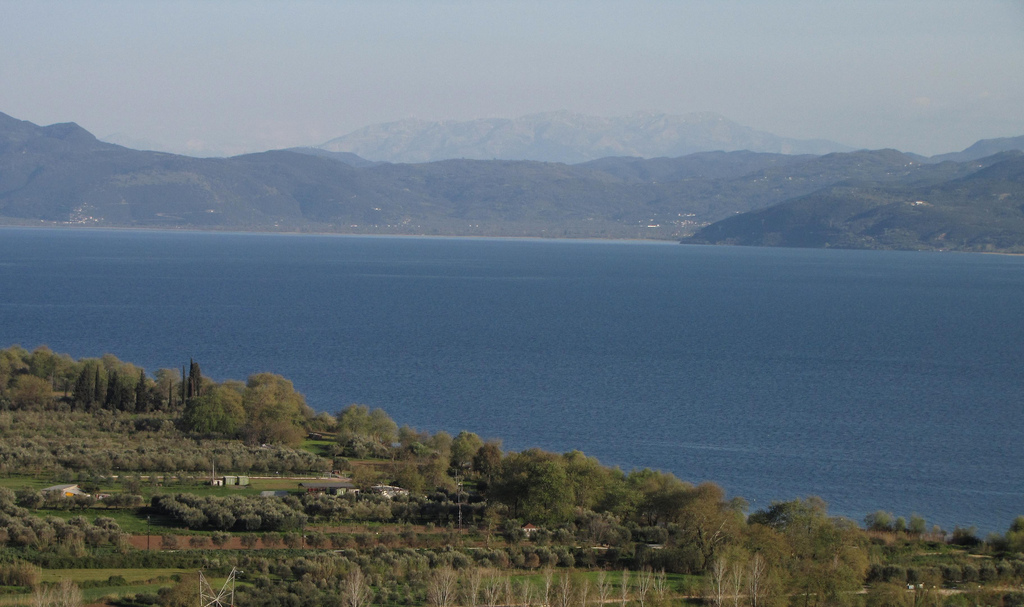
Lake Trichonida.

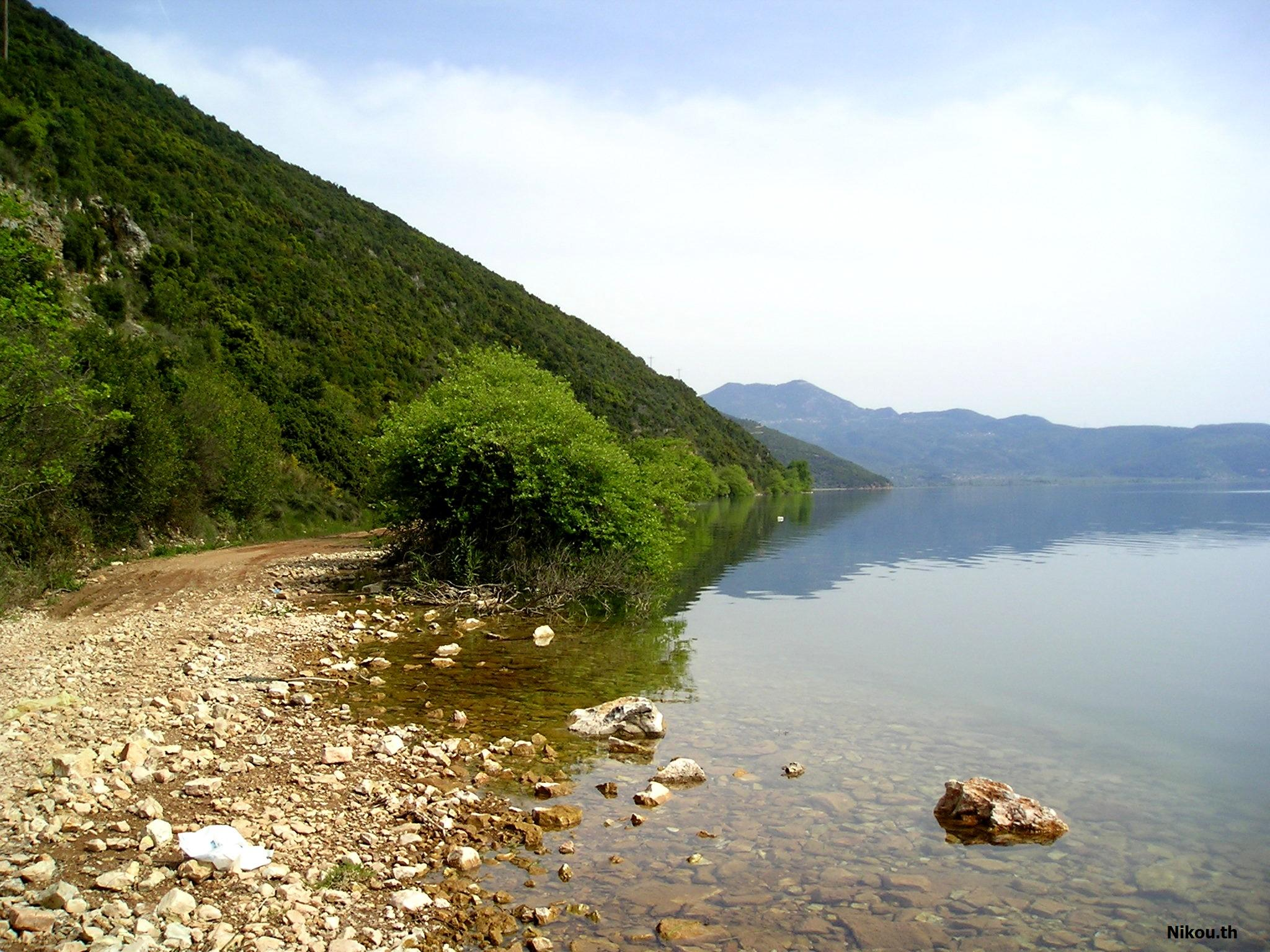
Myrtia, Trichonida.

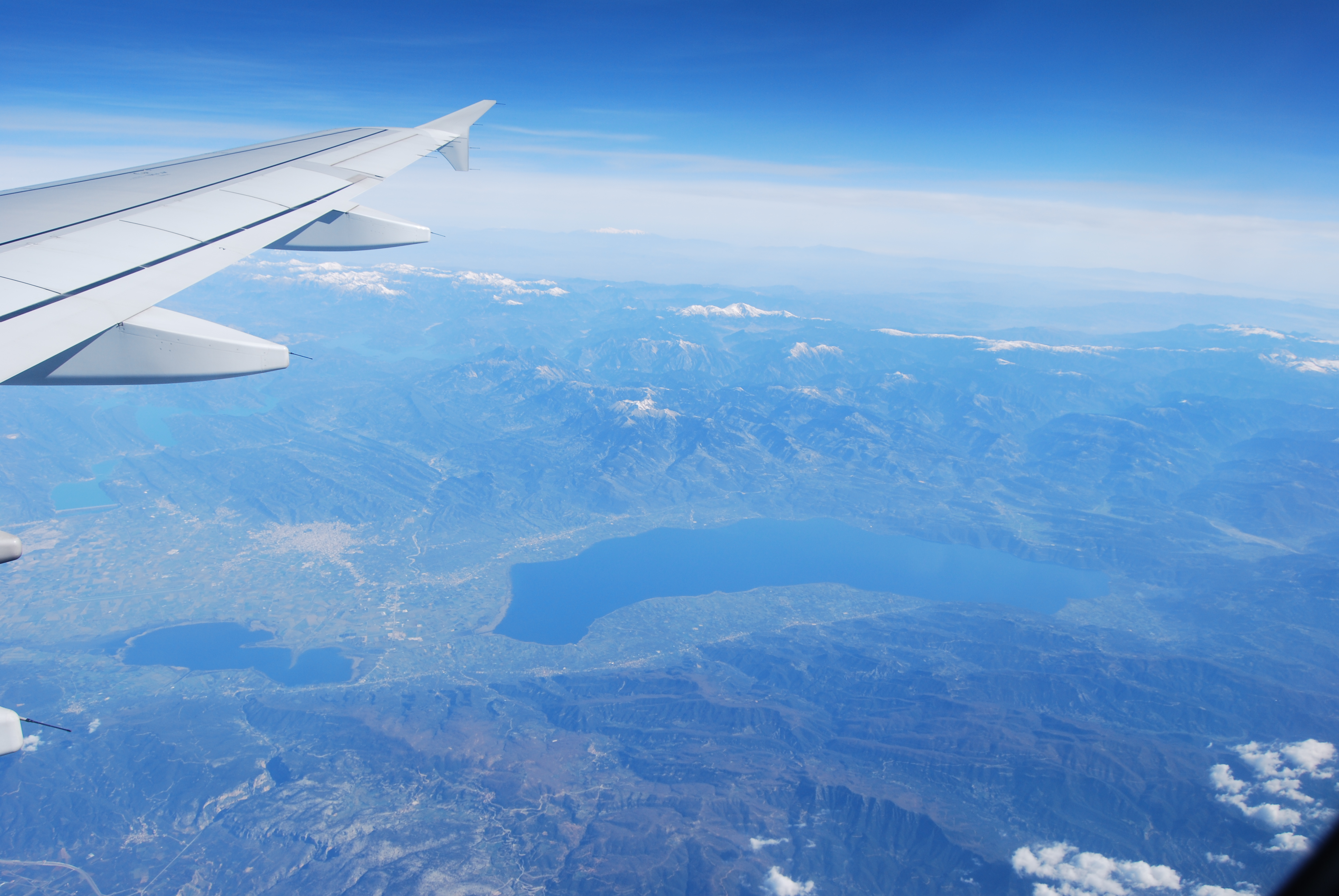
Trichonida and Lysimachia from the air.

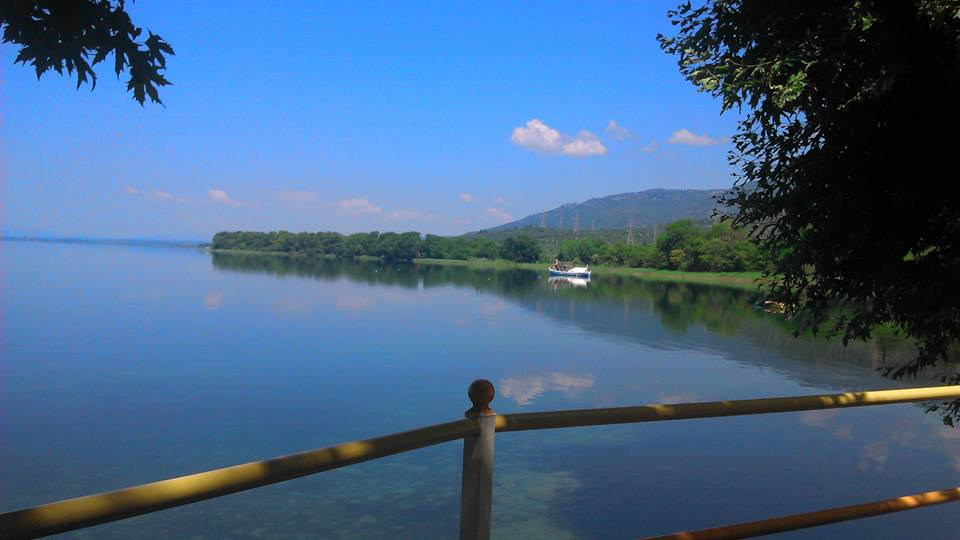
Lake Trichonida, view from Myrtia village.

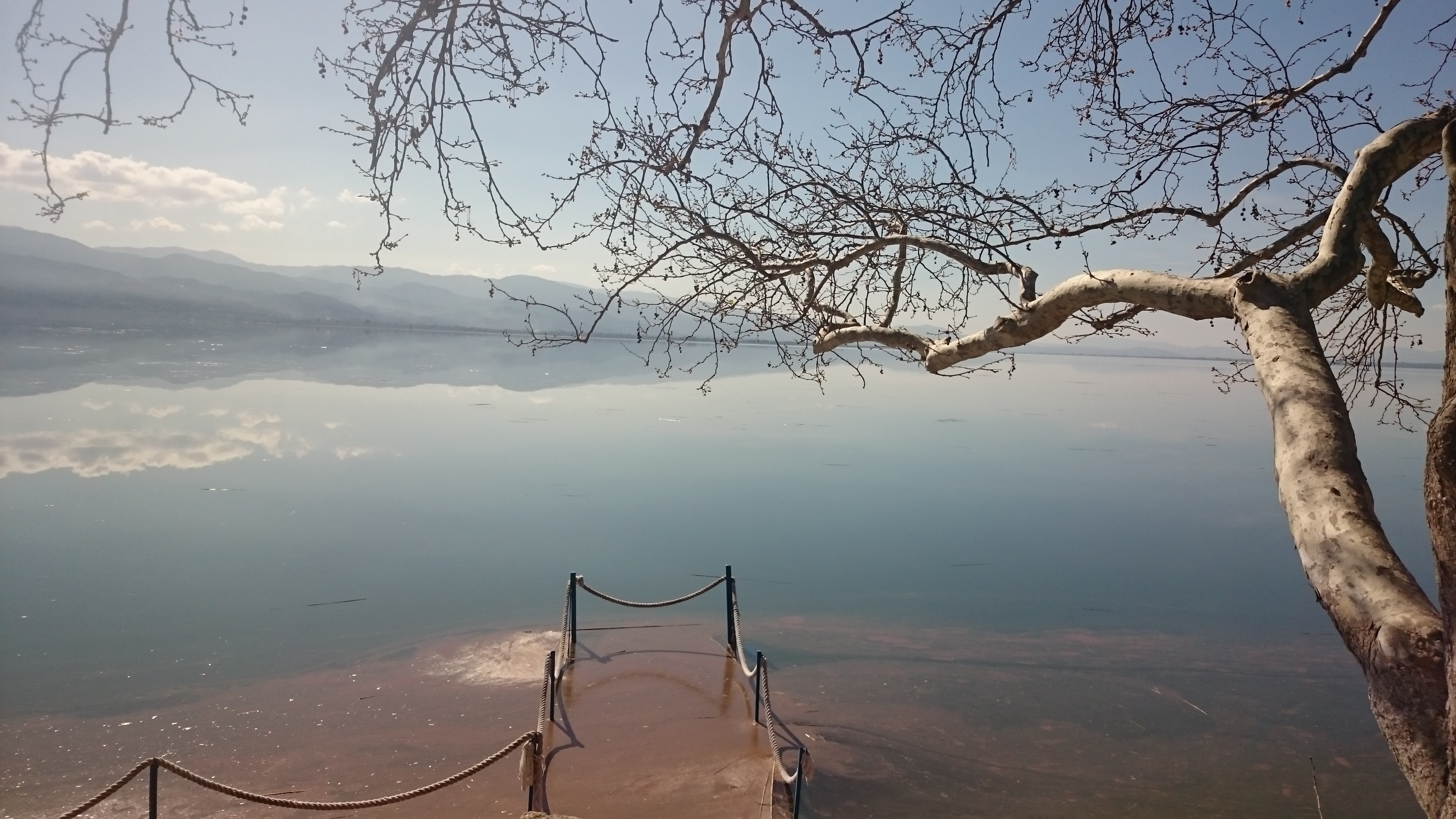
Partial view of Lake Trichonida.

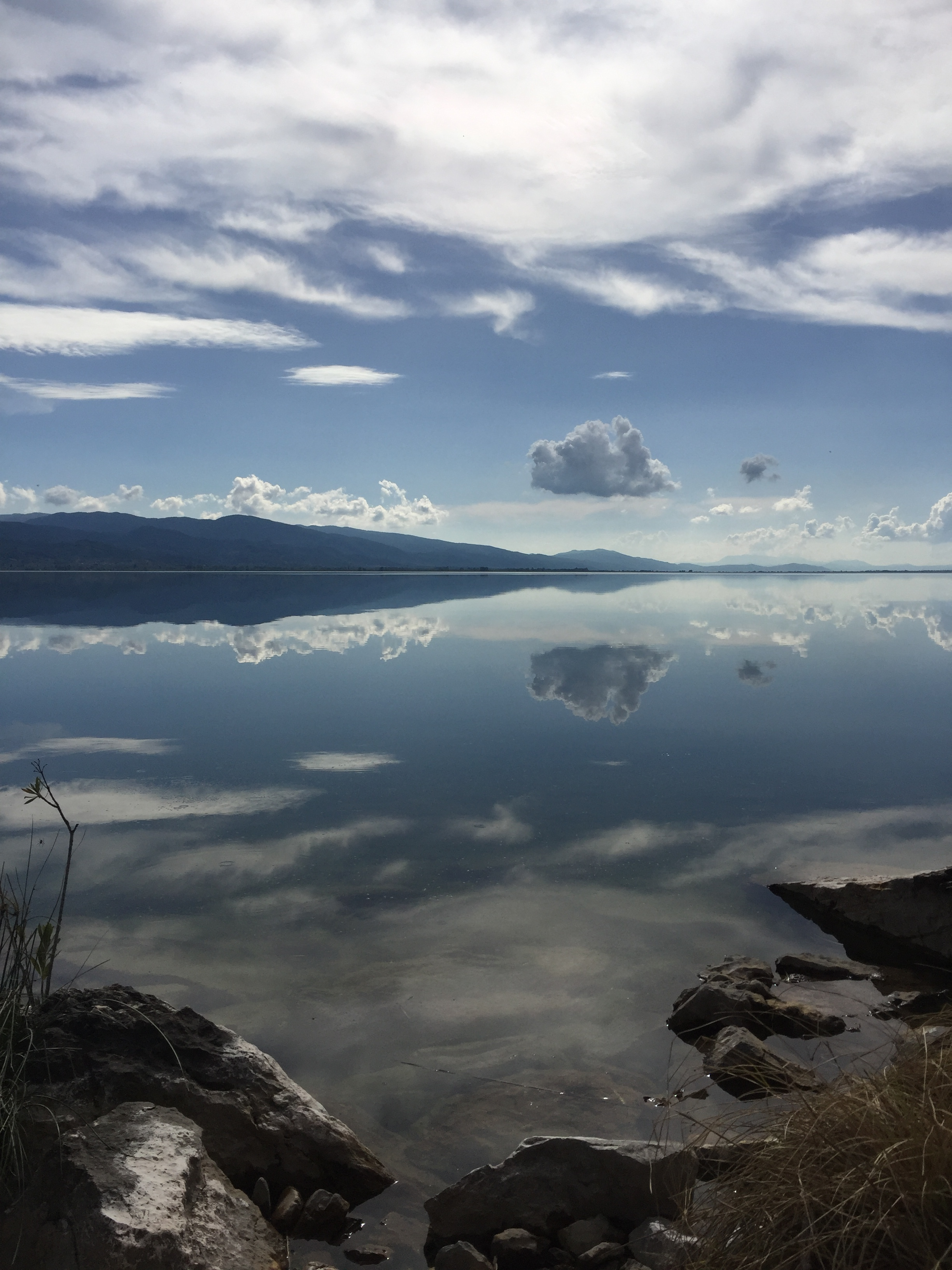
Partial view of Lake Trichonida.

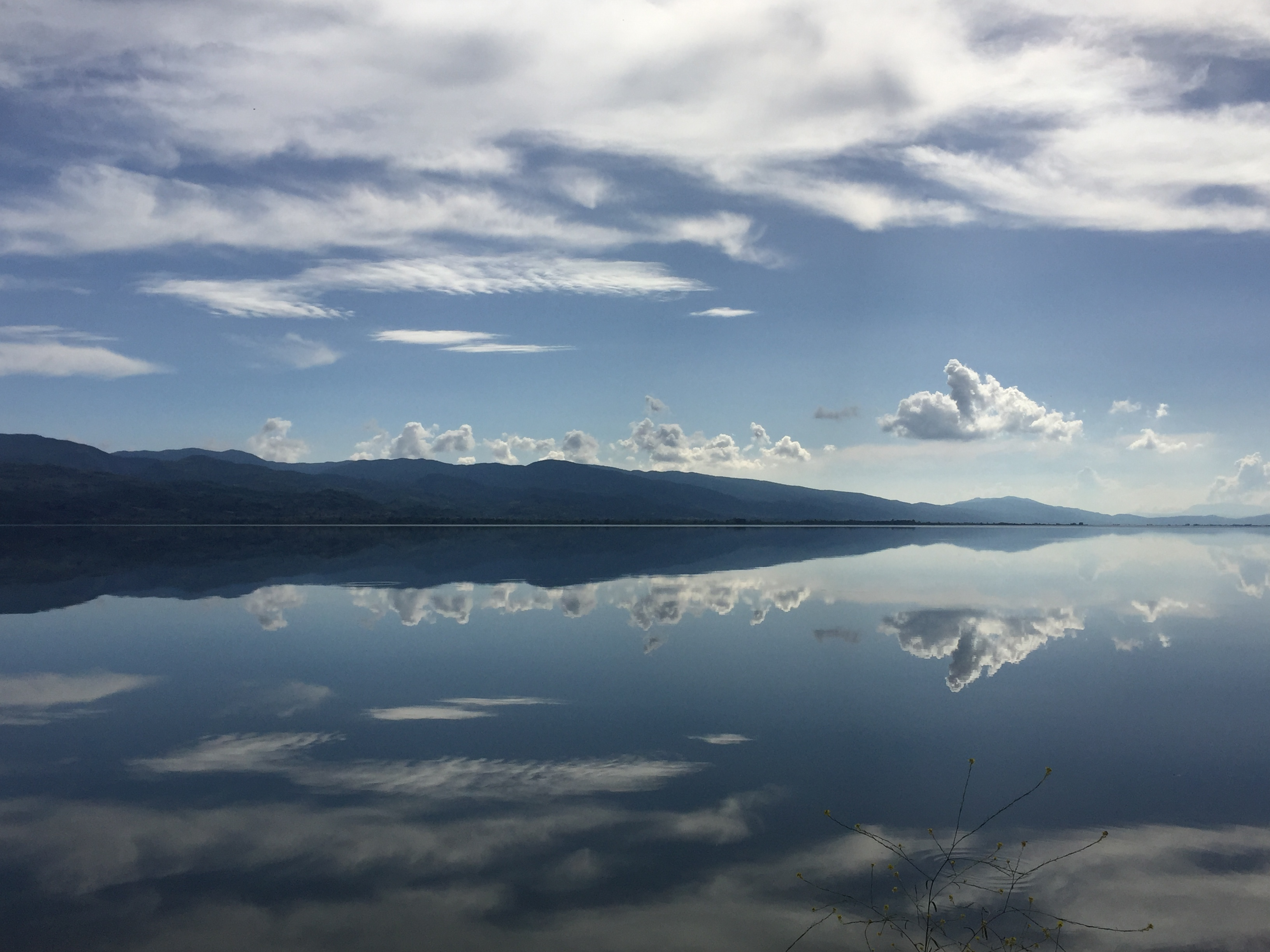
Partial view of Lake Trichonida.

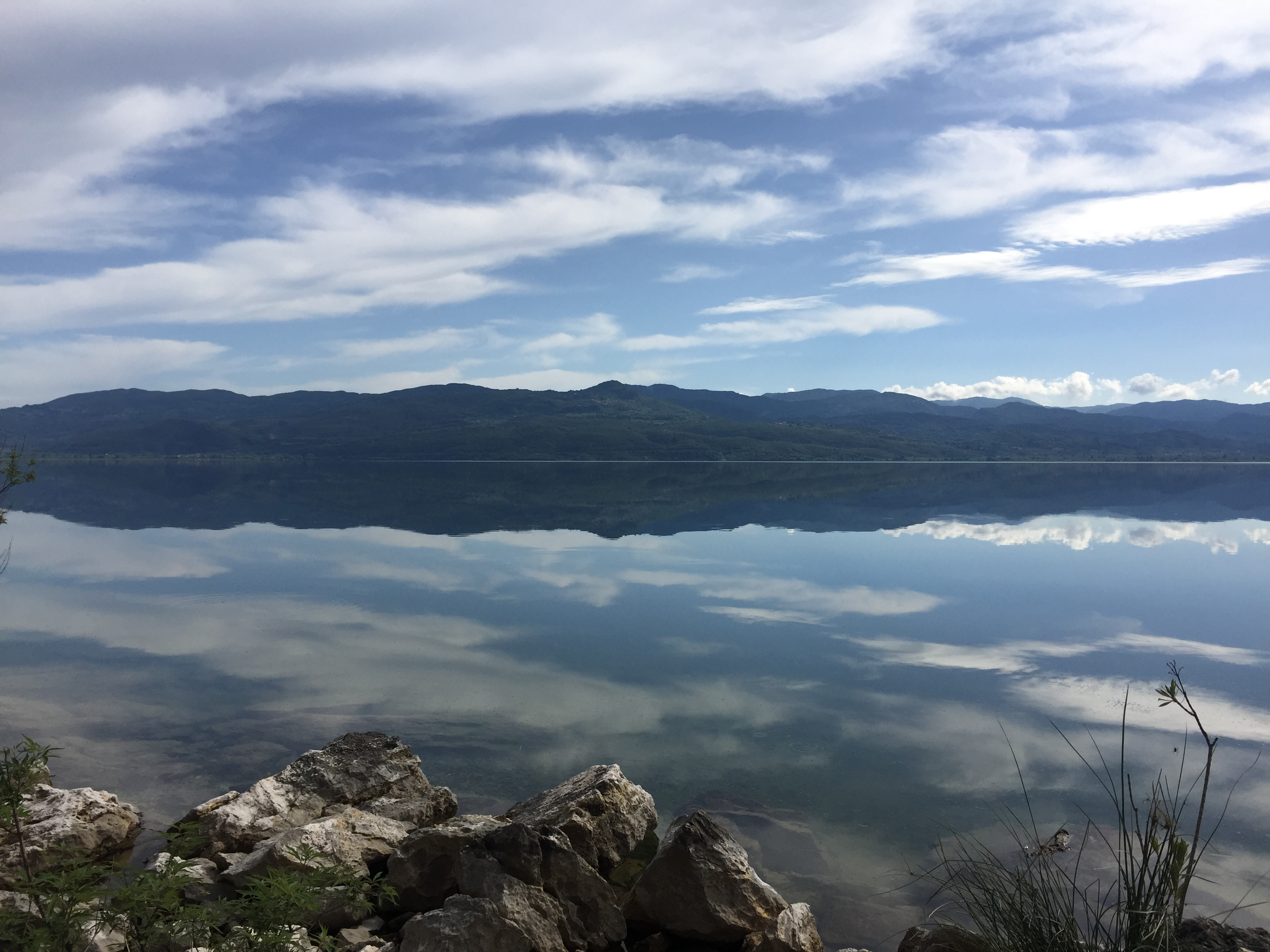
Partial view of Lake Trichonida.

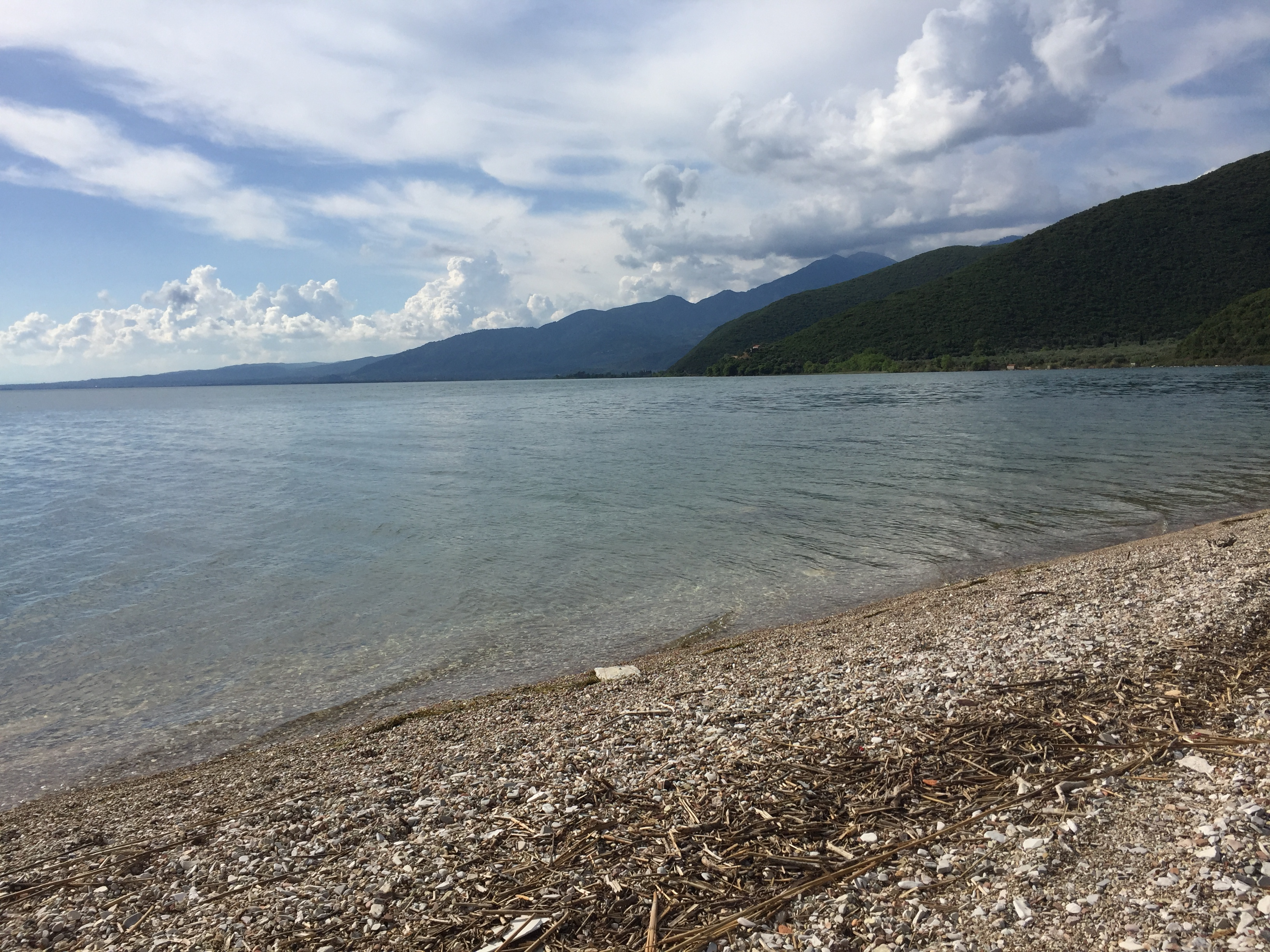
Partial view of Lake Trichonida.

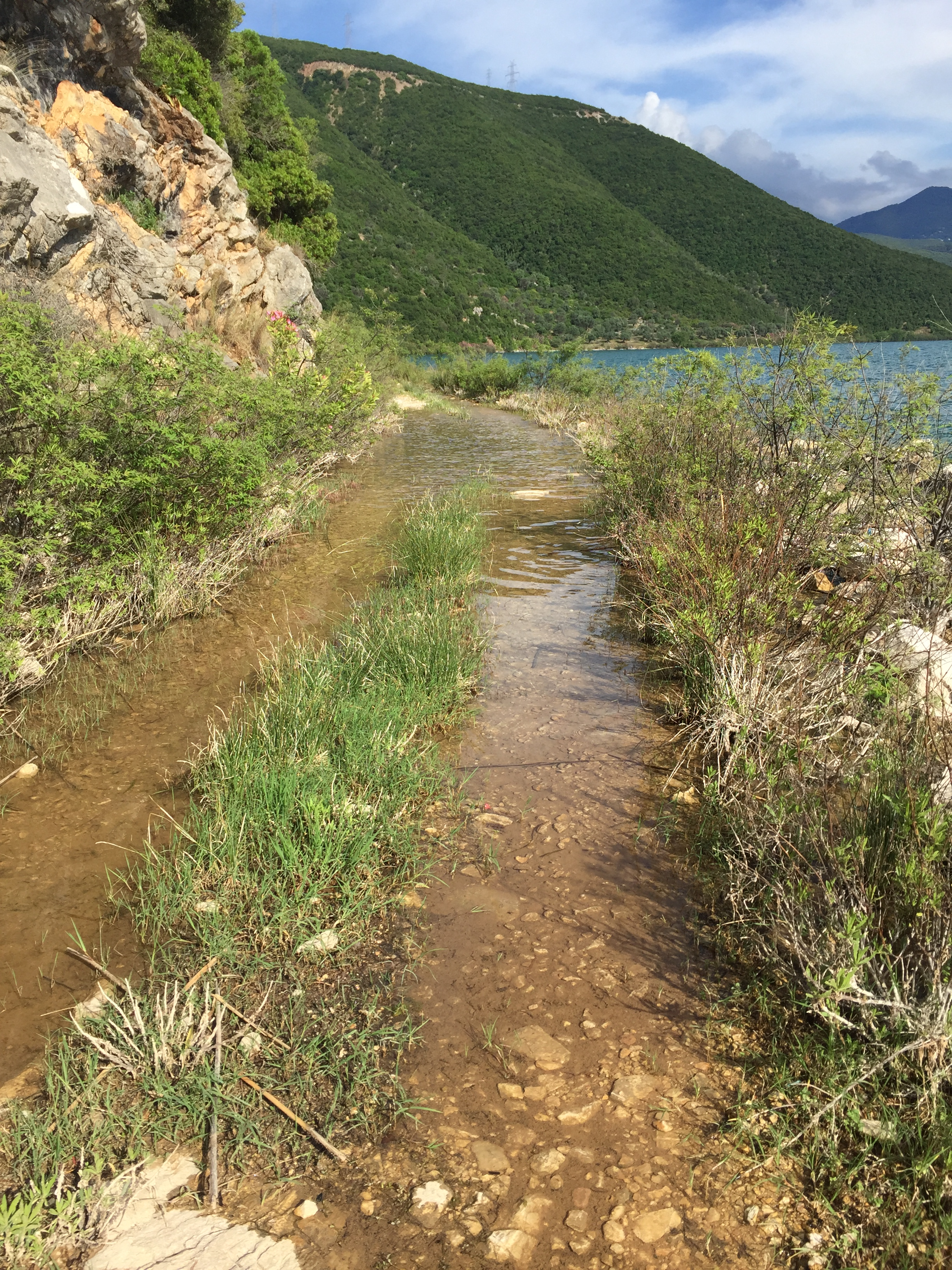
View of landscape near Lake Trichonida.

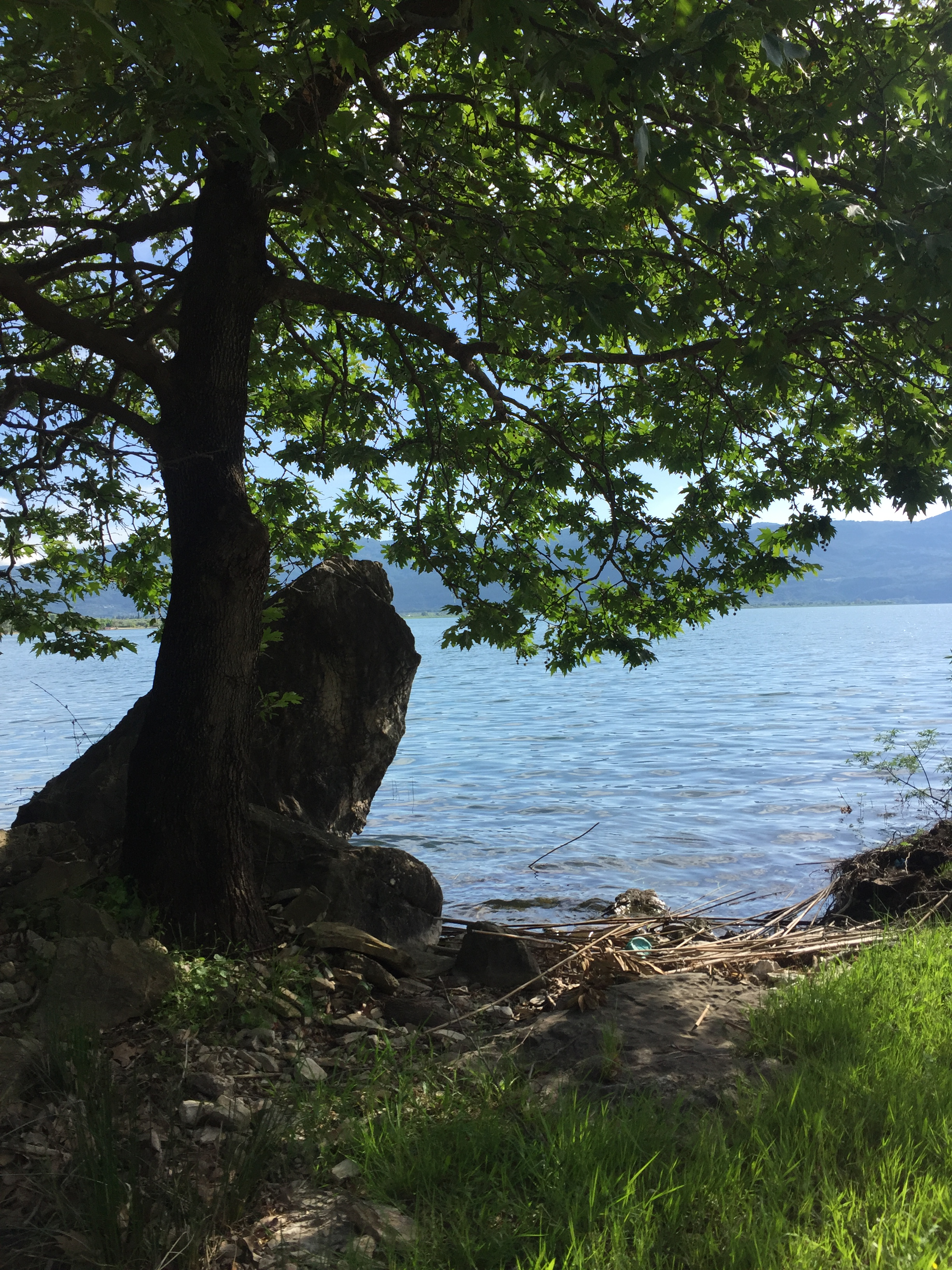
Partial view of Lake Trichonida.

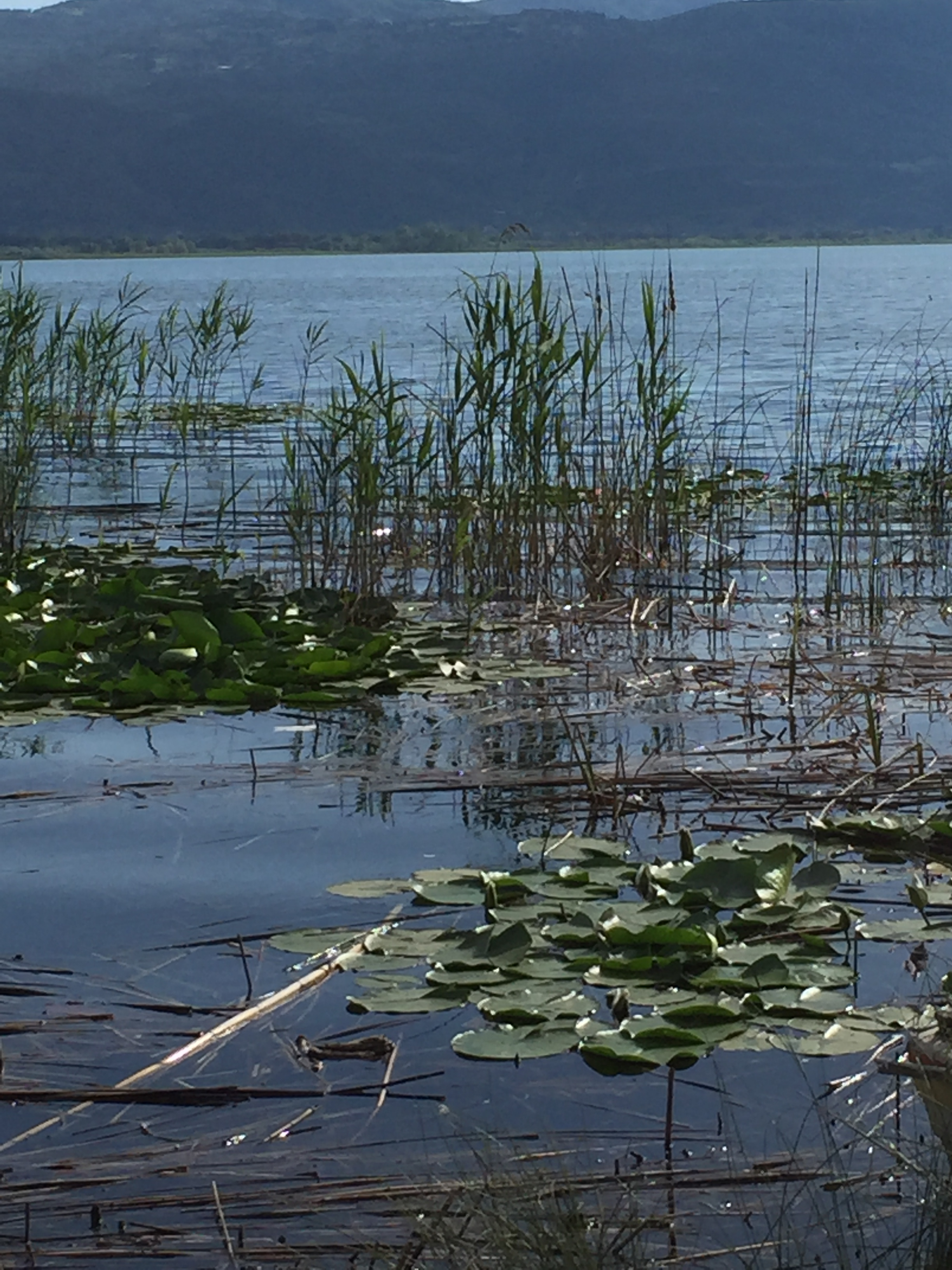
Partial view of Lake Trichonida.

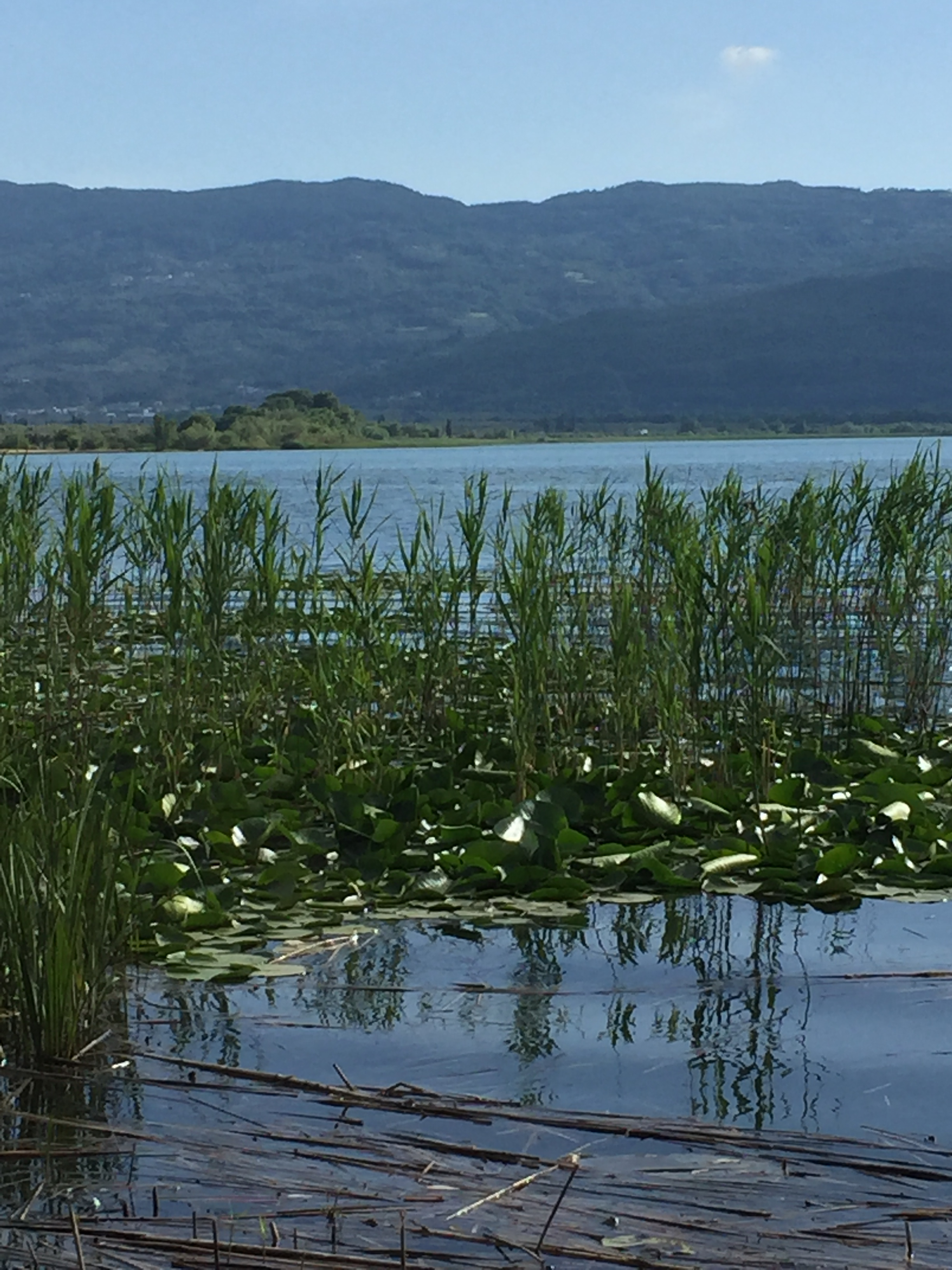
Partial view of Lake Trichonida.

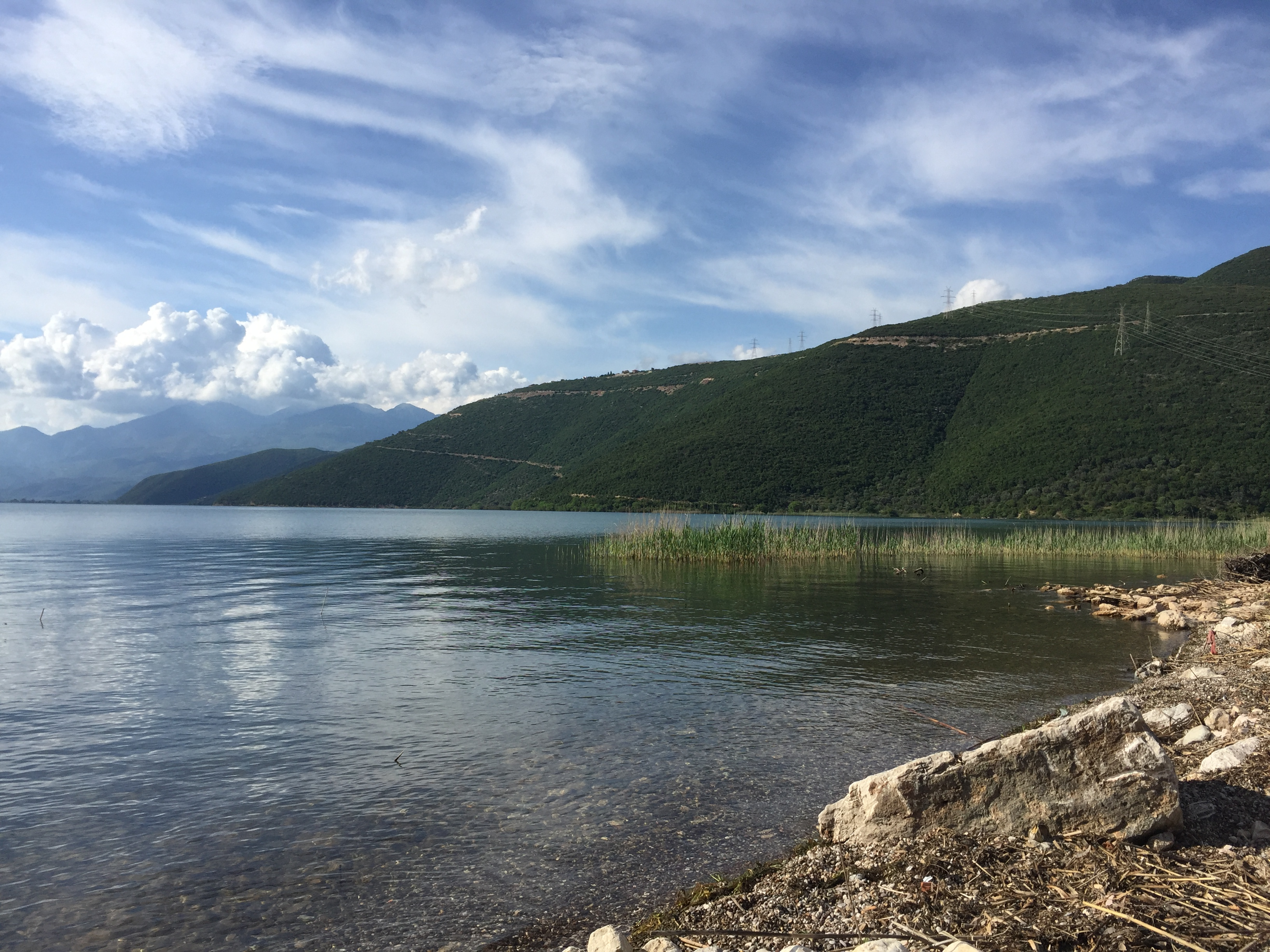
Partial view of Lake Trichonida.
