= Neapoli, Aetolia-Acarnania =

Neapoli Νεάπολη
- Municipal unit
- Location within the regional unit

- Location within Greece
- Coordinates: 38°40′N 21°22′E
- Country: Greece
- Administrative region: West Greece
- Regional unit: Aetolia-Acarnania
- Municipality: Agrinio

Area
  - Municipal unit: 60.476 km^{2} (23.350 sq mi)
- Elevation: 90 m (300 ft)

Population (2021)
  - Municipal unit: 4,415
  - Municipal unit density: 73.00/km^{2} (189.1/sq mi)
  - Community: 1,266
- Time zone: UTC+2 (EET)
  - Summer (DST): UTC+3 (EEST)

Neapoli (Greek: Νεάπολη) is a village and a former municipality in Aetolia-Acarnania, West Greece, Greece. Since the 2011 local government reform it is part of the municipality Agrinio, of which it is a municipal unit. The municipal unit has an area of 60.476 km^{2}. Population 4,415 (2021).
