= Thestieis =

Thestieis Θεστιείς
- Municipal unit
- Location within the regional unit

- Location within Greece
- Coordinates: 38°36′N 21°30′E
- Country: Greece
- Administrative region: West Greece
- Regional unit: Aetolia-Acarnania
- Municipality: Agrinio

Area
  - Municipal unit: 75.1 km^{2} (29.0 sq mi)

Population (2021)
  - Municipal unit: 5,874
  - Municipal unit density: 78.2/km^{2} (203/sq mi)
- Time zone: UTC+2 (EET)
  - Summer (DST): UTC+3 (EEST)
- Postal code: 300 05
- Area code: 26410

Thestieis (Greek: Θεστιείς) is a former municipality in Aetolia-Acarnania, West Greece, Greece. Since the 2011 local government reform, it is part of the municipality Agrinio, of which it is a municipal unit. The municipal unit has an area of 75.058 km^{2}. The seat of the Thestieis municipal unit is Kainourgio. It is situated at the northwestern shore of Lake Trichonida.
