= Little Wallachia =

Little Wallachia or Little Vlachia, or Lesser Wallachia or Lesser Vlachia (Latin: Valachia Minor), may refer to places inhabited by Romanians or Aromanians, derived from the exonym "Vlach":

- An area, also known as Lesser Wallachia, in what is now Oltenia, Romania
- An alternate name used in the 15th-18th century for Moldavia
- A medieval name for the areas of Aromanian settlement in Aetolia-Acarnania, Greece
- An area in what is now central Croatia registered during Austrians and Turks wars.
