= Evinos =

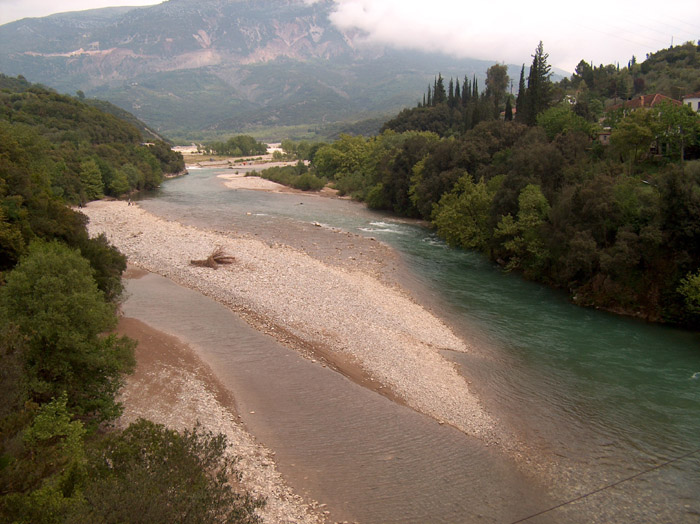

Location
- Country: Greece

Physical characteristics
- Source
  - location: Aetolia-Acarnania
- Mouth
  - location: Gulf of Patras
  - coordinates: 38°18′15″N 21°31′9″E
- Length: 92 km (57 mi)

Evinos (Greek: Εύηνος) is a 92-kilometre-long (57 mi) river in western Greece, flowing into the Gulf of Patras. Its source is in the northern Vardousia mountains, near the village Artotina, Phocis. The river flows in a generally southwestern direction, for most of its length in Aetolia-Acarnania. It feeds the reservoir of Lake Evinos, that is about 10km². The river flows through a deep forested valley with few small villages. In its lower course it flows through lowlands, and it empties into the Gulf of Patras 10km southeast of Missolonghi. The village Evinochori near its mouth owes its name to this river.

== Evinos artificial lake ==
Due to the flooding of the area, a new dam was ordered by the Aitoloakarnanian government to construct a dam near the four-boundaries region of northern Nafpaktia. It took nearly one year and was completed in 2003. Its area is about 5 to 10km², the height and the depth is approximately 50 m. It rarely supplies water to the area, but it is the westernmost and newest expansion of the water supply line Evinos-Mornos-Yliki-Marathon which covers the needs of Athens. It is connected to the existing Mornos expansion via an underground pipeline 30km long and further to Athens.

== Places near the river ==
- Grammeni Oxya
- Perdikovrysi
- Agios Dimitrios
- Stranoma
- Trikorfo
- Evinochori
- Galatas

== History ==
The river was first mentioned in Homeric times.
