= Apodotia =

Apodotia Αποδοτία
- Municipal unit
- Location within the regional unit

- Location within Greece
- Coordinates: 38°36′N 21°56′E
- Country: Greece
- Administrative region: West Greece
- Regional unit: Aetolia-Acarnania
- Municipality: Nafpaktia

Area
  - Municipal unit: 257.6 km^{2} (99.5 sq mi)

Population (2021)
  - Municipal unit: 1,485
  - Municipal unit density: 5.765/km^{2} (14.93/sq mi)
- Time zone: UTC+2 (EET)
  - Summer (DST): UTC+3 (EEST)
- Postal code: 300 23
- Area code: 26340

Apodotia (Greek: Αποδοτία) is a former municipality in Aetolia-Acarnania, West Greece, Greece. Since the 2011 local government reform it is part of the municipality Nafpaktia, of which it is a municipal unit. The municipal unit has an area of 257.635 km^{2}. The seat of the municipality, established in 1996, was the village Ano Chora. An earlier municipality Apodotia existed between 1835 and 1912.

== Subdivisions ==
The municipal unit Apodotia is subdivided into the following communities (constituent villages in brackets):

- Ano Chora
- Ampelakiotissa
- Anavryti
- Aspria
- Grammeni Oxya
- Grigori
- Elatovrysi
- Elatou
- Kalloni
- Katafygio (Katafygio, Golemi)
- Kato Chora
- Kentriki (Kentriki, Sellos)
- Kokkinochori (Kokkinochori, Sotiro, Chrisovo)
- Kryoneria
- Kydonea
- Lefka
- Limnitsa
- Mandrini
- Podos
- Terpsithea
