= Paravola =

Paravola Παραβόλα
- Municipal unit
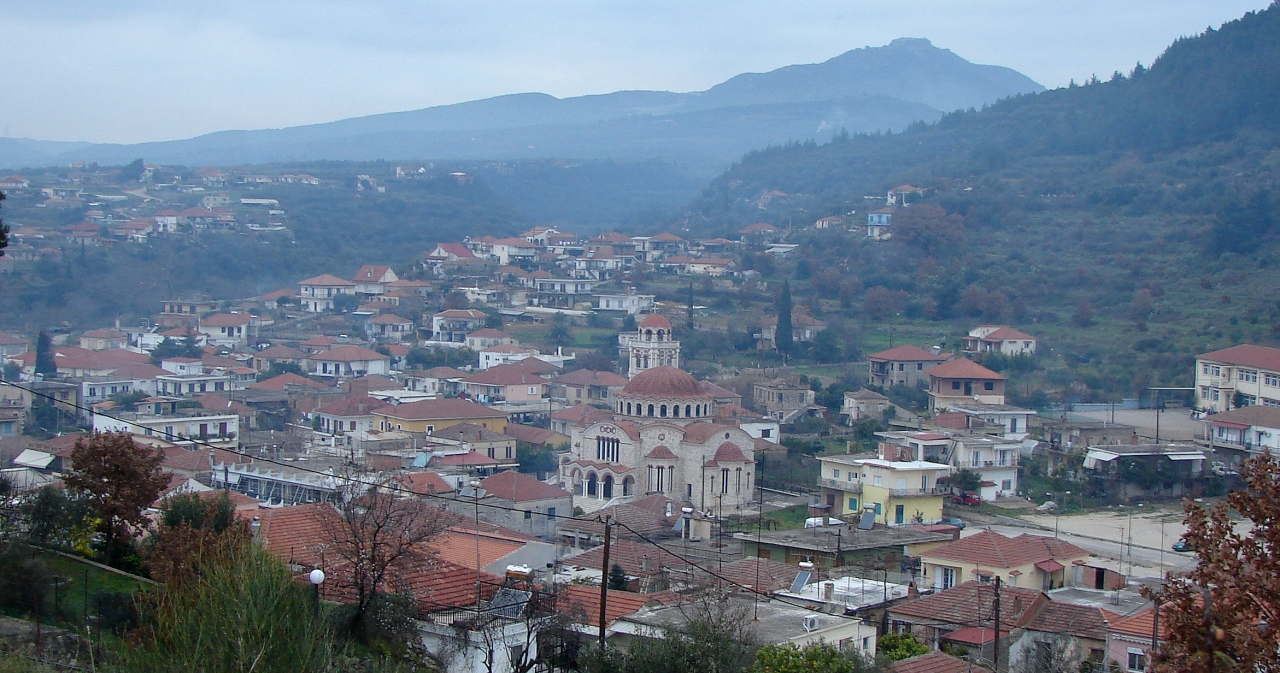
- View of the town

- Location within the regional unit

- Location within Greece
- Coordinates: 38°37′N 21°31′E
- Country: Greece
- Administrative region: West Greece
- Regional unit: Aetolia-Acarnania
- Municipality: Agrinio

Area
  - Municipal unit: 135.4 km^{2} (52.3 sq mi)
- Elevation: 60 m (200 ft)

Population (2021)
  - Municipal unit: 3,105
  - Municipal unit density: 22.93/km^{2} (59.39/sq mi)
  - Community: 1,408
- Time zone: UTC+2 (EET)
  - Summer (DST): UTC+3 (EEST)
- Postal code: 30010

Paravola (Greek: Παραβόλα) is a village and a former municipality in Aetolia-Acarnania, West Greece, Greece. Since the 2011 local government reform it is part of the municipality Agrinio, of which it is a municipal unit. The municipal unit has an area of 135.373 km^{2}. Population 3,105 (2021).

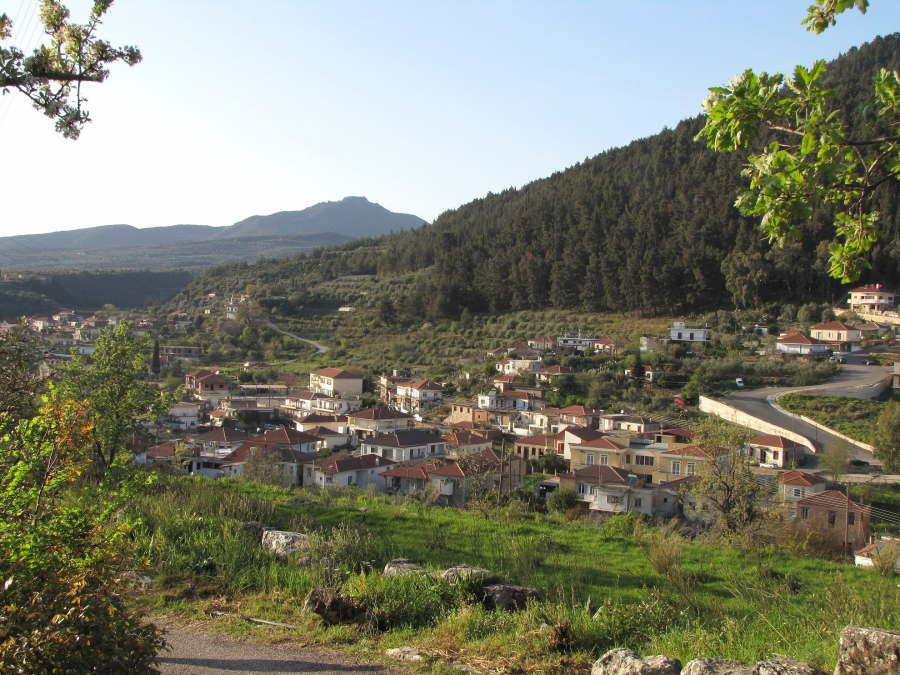
