= Arakynthos =

Arakynthos Αράκυνθος
- Municipal unit
- Location within the regional unit

- Location within Greece
- Coordinates: 38°29′N 21°27′E
- Country: Greece
- Administrative region: West Greece
- Regional unit: Aetolia-Acarnania
- Municipality: Agrinio

Area
  - Municipal unit: 99.72 km^{2} (38.50 sq mi)

Population (2021)
  - Municipal unit: 4,197
  - Municipal unit density: 42.09/km^{2} (109.0/sq mi)
- Time zone: UTC+2 (EET)
  - Summer (DST): UTC+3 (EEST)
- Postal code: 300 11
- Area code: 26350

Arakynthos (Greek: Αράκυνθος) is a former municipality in Aetolia-Acarnania, West Greece, Greece. Since the 2011 local government reform it is part of the municipality Agrinio, of which it is a municipal unit. The municipal unit has an area of 99.717 km^{2}. It consists of the villages of Ano Kerasovo, Kato Kerasovo, Zevgaraki, Papadates (seat of the former municipality), Mataranga and Grammatikou.
