= Panagia Varnakova Monastery =

Medieval monastery of Phokida, Central Greece

- Μονή Παναγίας Βαρνάκοβας
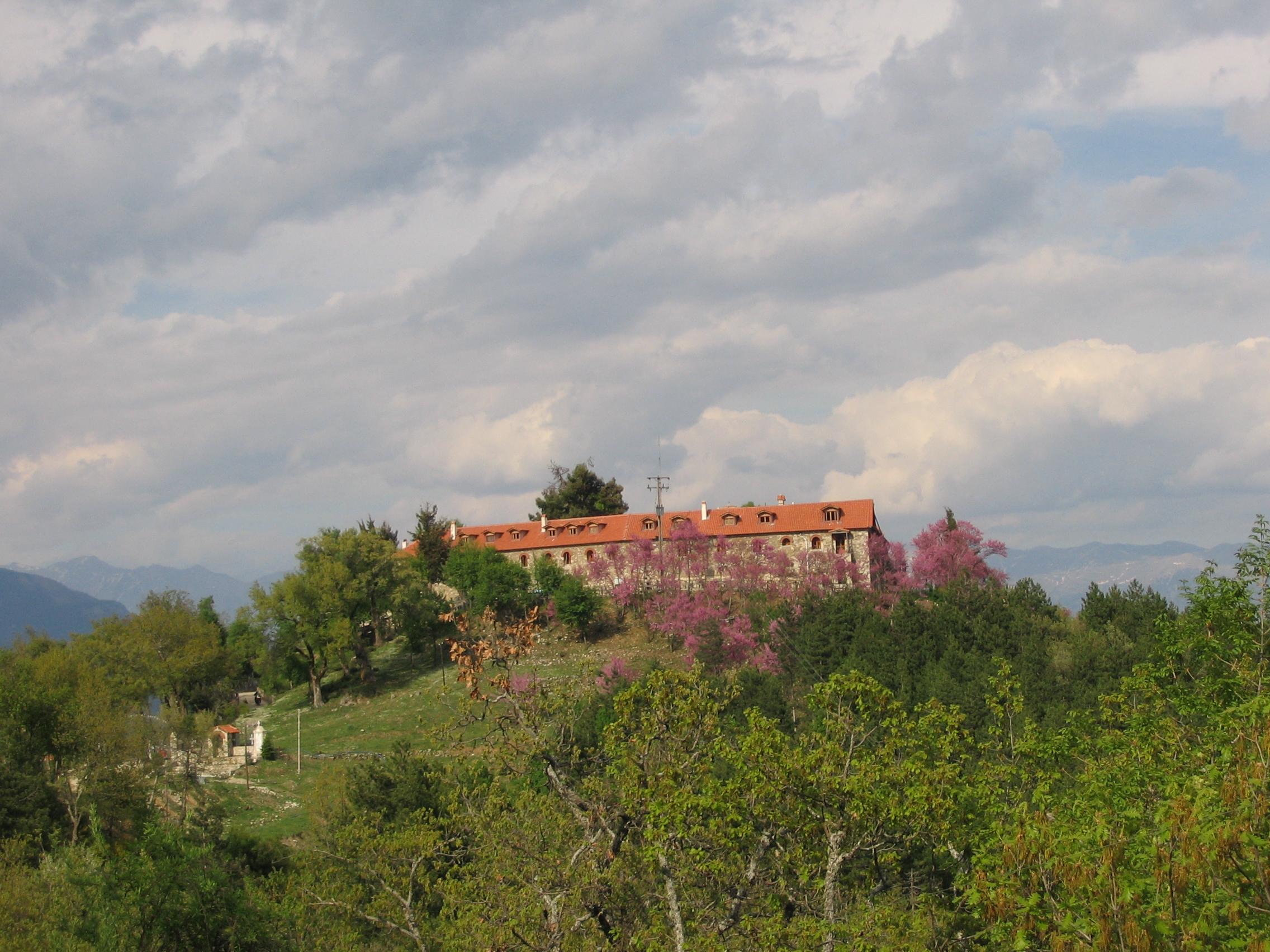

Monastery information
- Established: 11th century
- Dedicated to: Dormition of Theotokos
- Celebration date: August 15
- Diocese: Metropolis of Phokidos

Site
- Location: Efpalio, Phocis
- Country: Greece
- Coordinates: 38°28′28″N 21°57′55″E

The Panagia Varnakova Monastery (Greek: Μονή Παναγίας Βαρνάκοβας) is one of the most historic monasteries in Greece. It was founded during the mid-Byzantine period, in the year 1077, by Saint Arsenius the Varnakovite and quickly emerged as a religious center of great influence, a position it maintains to this day, called "the Holy Lavra of Roumeli". Its characteristic name "Varnakova" probably comes from an older Slavic toponym.

The monastery is located at the southwestern end of the Phocis, in the former municipality of Efpalio, approximately 25 km northeast of Nafpaktos, on the old road of Lidoriki. It is built on a small hill on the outskirts of the Vardousia Mountains and at an altitude of about 750 meters, in a dense forest of oak and horse chestnut trees, with views towards the mountainous Nafpaktia, Doris, Mount Giona and the Mornos river.

The top relic of the monastery was the miraculous icon of Panagia Varnakova. The icon bore an obvious crack along the face of the Virgin, which according to eyewitnesses was created by a local earthquake on August 15, 1940, at the time of the torpedoing of the Elli in Tinos. It was destroyed by fire on Sunday, June 14, 2020, along with other historical relics.

== Sources ==
- Αν. Κ. Ορλάνδος (1922). Η Μονή Βαρνάκοβας, Έκδοσις της εν Αθήναις Δωρικής Αδελφότητος.
- Κωνσταντίνος Δυοβουνιώτης (1923). «Θεοδόσιος Ζυγομαλάς», Θεολογία, τομ. 1, σελ. 141–266.
- Π. Π. Καλονάρος (1957). Η Ιερά Μονή της Υπεραγίας Θεοτόκου, η Επιλεγομένη Βαρνάκοβα.
- Ι. Γιαννόπουλος (1970). Ανέκδοτα ενετικά έγγραφα της εν Δωρίδι μονής Βαρνακόβας (1688-1698)
- Βασίλης Κατσαρός (1979). «Ένα χρονικό της Μονής Βαρνάκοβας (ΧΦ 1 Μονής Βαρνάκοβας)», Κληρονομία, τομ. 11, σελ. 347–390.
- Ιερά Μητρόπολις Φωκίδος (1997). Ιερά Μονή Παναγίας Βαρνάκοβας.
- Ευ. Λέκκος (1997). Τα Μοναστήρια του Ελληνισμού, τόμος Α΄, Εκδόσεις Ιχνηλάτης.
- Γεωργιάδης (2004). Η Πολυώνυμος Δέσποινα και τα Επώνυμα Προσκυνήματά Της, τόμος ΣΤ΄.

Publications of the Holy Monastery

- Ι.Μ. Παναγίας Βαρνάκοβας (1997), Όσιος Αρσένιος ο Βαρνακοβίτης.
- Ι.Μ. Παναγίας Βαρνάκοβας (1997), Αρχείο Θαυμάτων της Παναγίας Βαρνάκοβας.
- Ι.Μ. Παναγίας Βαρνάκοβας (1999), Τα Θαυμάσια της Υπεραγίας Θεοτόκου, της Επονομαζόμενης Βαρνάκοβας.
- Ι.Μ. Παναγίας Βαρνάκοβας (2000), Ηρωικά Χρόνια της Βαρνάκοβας.
- Ι.Μ. Παναγίας Βαρνάκοβας (2004), Ο Όσιος Δαυίδ και Καλογεροδάσκαλοι της Βαρνάκοβας επί Τουρκοκρατίας.
- Ι.Μ. Παναγίας Βαρνάκοβας (2007), Νεώτερα Θαύματα της Παναγίας στη Βαρνάκοβα.
- Ι.Μ. Παναγίας Βαρνάκοβας (2009), Εκφράσεις του Πνευματικού Κόσμου - Ουράνια μηνύματα, Θαυμαστά γεγονότα.
- Ι.Μ. Παναγίας Βαρνάκοβας (2011), Μαρτυρικά και Ηρωικά Νιάτα.
- Ι.Μ. Παναγίας Βαρνάκοβας (2014), Ιστορία και Θεομητορικά Θαύματα της Παναγίας Βαρνάκοβας.
