= Panaitoliko =

Panaitoliko Παναιτωλικό
- Municipal unit
- Location within the regional unit

- Location within Greece
- Coordinates: 38°41′N 21°29′E
- Country: Greece
- Administrative region: West Greece
- Regional unit: Aetolia-Acarnania
- Municipality: Agrinio

Area
  - Municipal unit: 105.98 km^{2} (40.92 sq mi)
- Elevation: 467 m (1,532 ft)

Population (2021)
  - Municipal unit: 1,073
  - Municipal unit density: 10.12/km^{2} (26.22/sq mi)
- Time zone: UTC+2 (EET)
  - Summer (DST): UTC+3 (EEST)

Panaitoliko (Greek: Παναιτωλικό) is a former municipality in Aetolia-Acarnania, West Greece, Greece. Since the 2011 local government reform it is part of the municipality Agrinio, of which it is a municipal unit. The municipal unit has an area of 105.976 km^{2}. Population 1,073 (2021). The seat of the municipality was in Skoutera.
