= Parakampylia =

Parakampylia Παρακαμπύλια
- Municipal unit
- Location within the regional unit

- Location within Greece
- Coordinates: 38°49′N 21°30′E
- Country: Greece
- Administrative region: West Greece
- Regional unit: Aetolia-Acarnania
- Municipality: Agrinio

Area
  - Municipal unit: 231.28 km^{2} (89.30 sq mi)
- Elevation: 468 m (1,535 ft)

Population (2021)
  - Municipal unit: 1,400
  - Municipal unit density: 6.1/km^{2} (16/sq mi)
- Time zone: UTC+2 (EET)
  - Summer (DST): UTC+3 (EEST)

Parakampylia (Greek: Παρακαμπύλια) is a former municipality in Aetolia-Acarnania, West Greece, Greece. Since the 2011 local government reform it is part of the municipality Agrinio, of which it is a municipal unit. The municipal unit has an area of 231.282 km^{2}. Population 1,400 (2021). The seat of the municipality was in Agios Vlasios.

== See also ==
- Potamoula, Parakampylia, Aetolia-Acarnania
