= Nafpaktia Mountains =

Mountainous region in Aetolia-Acarnania, Greece

- Location within Greece

Highest point
- Elevation: 1,472 m (4,829 ft)
- Coordinates: 38°35′N 21°58′E

Geography
- Location: Nafpaktia Mountains, eastern Aetolia-Acarnania, Greece

The Nafpaktia Mountains (Greek: Όρη Ναυπακτίας) or Mountainous Nafpaktia (Ορεινή Ναυπακτία) is a mountainous region in Aetolia-Acarnania, in central Greece. The highest peak is 1,472 metres (4,829 ft) high. The region ranges from the outskirts of the town of Nafpaktos in the south to Mount Vardousia in the northeast, and from the Mornos valley to the east to the Evinos valley to the west.
