= Platanos, Aetolia-Acarnania =

Platanos Πλάτανος
- Municipal unit
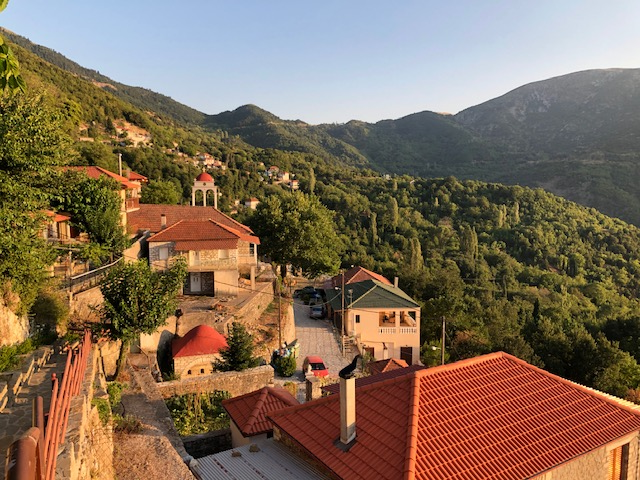
- Perista, one of the villages within the municipality of Platanos

- Location within the regional unit

- Location within Greece
- Coordinates: 38°36′N 21°47′E
- Country: Greece
- Administrative region: West Greece
- Regional unit: Aetolia-Acarnania
- Municipality: Nafpaktia

Area
  - Municipal unit: 169.7 km^{2} (65.5 sq mi)
- Elevation: 832 m (2,730 ft)

Population (2021)
  - Municipal unit: 928
  - Municipal unit density: 5.47/km^{2} (14.2/sq mi)
  - Community: 193
- Time zone: UTC+2 (EET)
  - Summer (DST): UTC+3 (EEST)
- Postal code: 300 22
- Area code: 26340
- Vehicle registration: AI, ME

Platanos (Greek: Πλάτανος meaning plane tree) is a village and a former municipality in Aetolia-Acarnania, West Greece, Greece. Since the 2011 local government reform it is part of the municipality Nafpaktia, of which it is a municipal unit. The municipal unit has an area of 169.678 km^{2}. The community includes the village Kato Platanos. The river Evinos is situated west of the town.

== Geography ==
The municipal unit Platanos is subdivided into the following communities (constituent villages in brackets):

- Platanos (Platanos, Kato Platanos)
- Agios Dimitrios
- Arachova (Arachova, Kranes)
- Achladokastro
- Dendrochori (uninhabited)
- Kastanea
- Klepa
- Livadaki
- Neochori Nafpaktias (Neochori, Petroto)
- Perdikovrysi
- Perista
- Chomori (Chomori, Agia Triada)

== Historical population ==
Year	Village	Community	Municipal unit
1981	-	358	
1991	227	-	1,694
2001	324	404	1,775
2011	207	253	1,611
2021	143	193	928
