= Aetolia-Acarnania =

Regional unit in Central Greece

Aetolia-Acarnania Περιφερειακή ενότητα Αιτωλοακαρνανίας
- Regional unit
- Municipalities of Aetolia-Acarnania

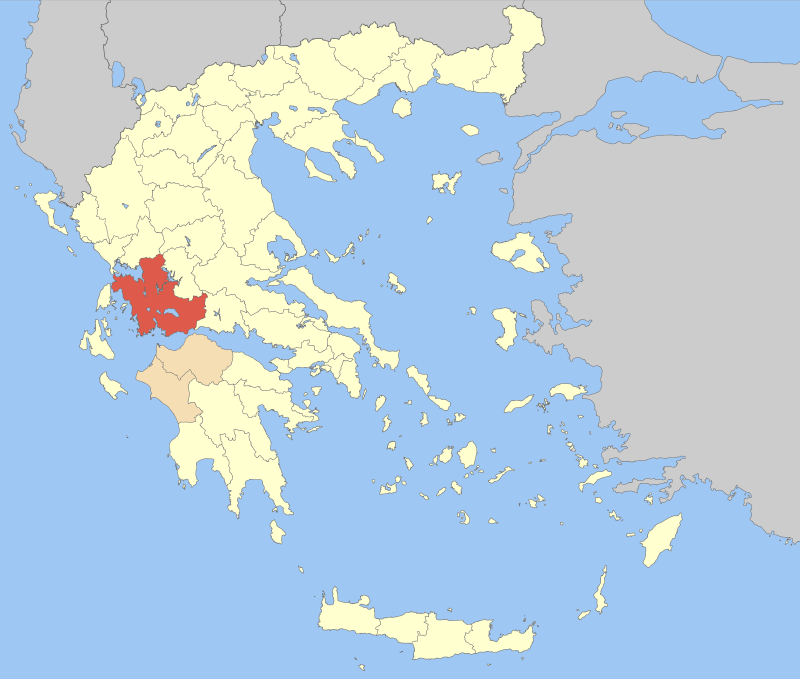
- Aetolia-Acarnania within Greece

- Location within Greece
- Coordinates: 38°40′N 21°25′E
- Country: Greece
- Administrative region: Western Greece
- Seat: Missolonghi
- Largest city: Agrinio

Area
  - Total: 5,461 km^{2} (2,109 sq mi)

Population (2021)
  - Total: 192,345
  - Density: 35.22/km^{2} (91.22/sq mi)
- Demonym(s): Aetolian, Acarnanian
- Time zone: UTC+2 (EET)
  - Summer (DST): UTC+3 (EEST)
- Postal code: 30x xx
- Area code: 263x0, 264x0
- Vehicle registration: ΑΙ, ΜΕ
- Website: www.pde.gov.gr/gr/

Aetolia-Acarnania (Greek: Αιτωλοακαρνανία, Aitoloakarnanía, Greek pronunciation: [etolo.akarnaˈni.a]) is the largest by area regional unit of Greece. It is part of the geographic region of Central Greece and the administrative region of West Greece. It is roughly a combination of the ancient regions of Aetolia and Acarnania. Its capital is Missolonghi for its historical role in the Greek Revolution, while its biggest city and economic centre is Agrinio. The area is now connected with the Peloponnese peninsula via the Rio-Antirio Bridge. The surrounding regional units take in Arta in Epirus, a narrow length bordering Karditsa of Thessaly, Evrytania to the northeast, and Phocis to the east.

== Geography ==
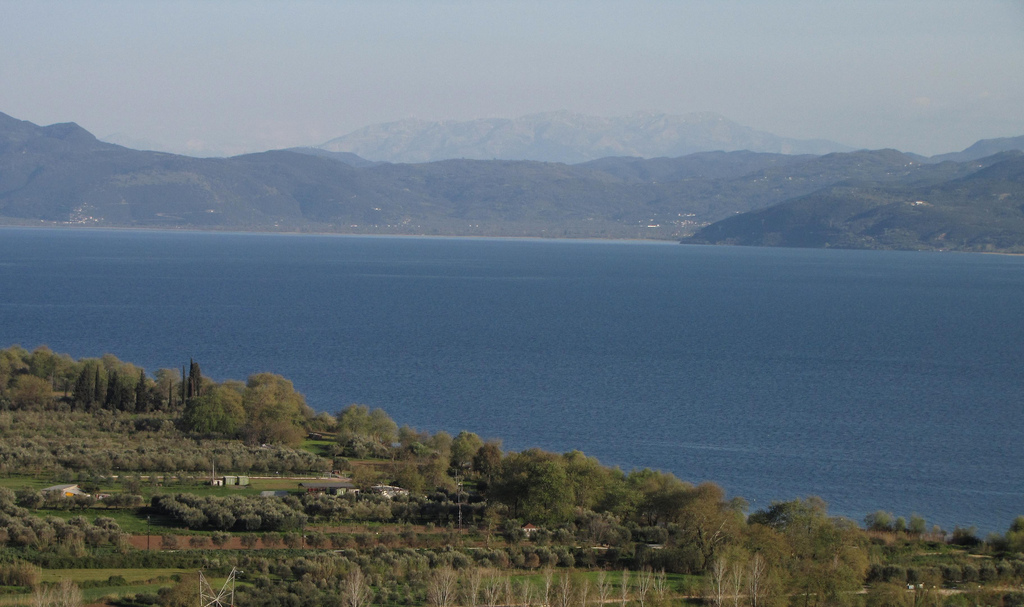
Trichonida lake

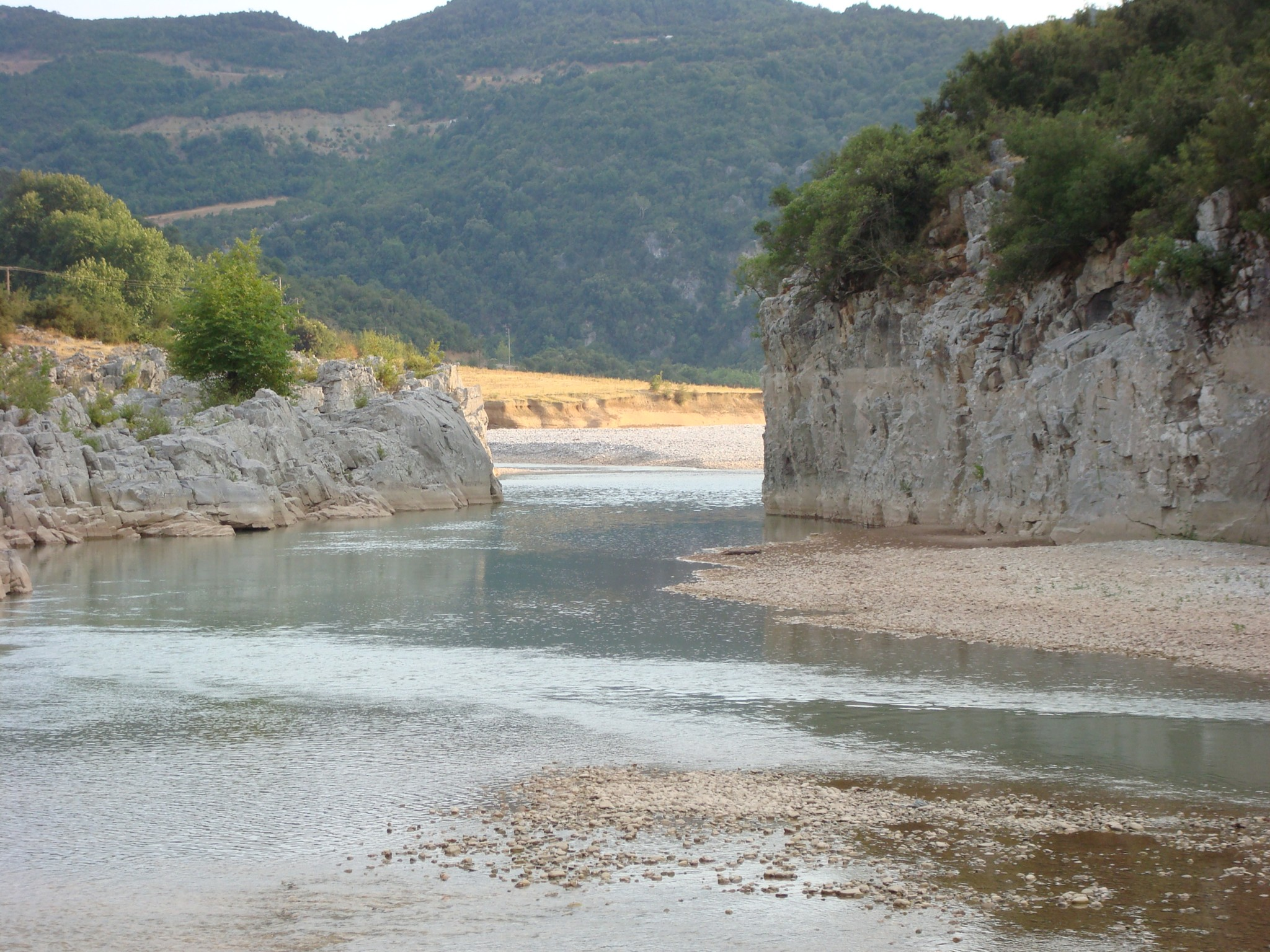
Acheloos river

Mountains dominate the north, northeast, west and southeast, especially the Acarnanian Mountains. The longest and main river is the Acheloos, which ends as a delta in wetlands to the southwest on a rich fertile valley. The second longest is Evinos; others include the Ermitsa, the Inachos, and the Mornos (on the border with Phocis). The regional unit excludes the islands lying to its west, since they belong to the Kefalonia and Ithaca regional units. There is one reservoir and a lake in its central part. The many mountains of the area span the Panaitoliko toward the northeast and the Acarnanian Mountains, the Valtos and the Makrynoros mountains in the north, the Nafpaktia Mountains in the southeast, the Arakynthos and Kravara in the south.

Lakes include the Amvrakia, the Lysimachia, Ozeros, and Trichonida, the largest lake in Greece, and artificial lakes and reservoirs include Kastraki, Kremasta, the largest lake in Greece since its creation in 1970, and Stratos. Two lagoons are found in the southern part of the regional unit: the Messolongi and the Aitoliko. The lowest altitude in Greece is found in west Aetolia-Acarnania at about -10 meters from the sea level.

=== Climate ===
Its climate ranges from hot and humid summers, with temperatures often surpassing 40 °C, to mild and short winters in the low-lying areas, with cool winters dominating in the mountain areas. At the highest elevations, summers are cool, and snow and cold weather dominate the winter months in the Panaitoliko.

== History ==
=== Ottoman era ===
During the Ottoman period, between the 16th century until the Greek War of Independence, the region was called Karleli and formed a province (sanjak) in the Rumelia Eyalet.

=== Modern Aetolia-Acarnania ===
Aetolia and Acarnania became a prefecture and merged to form Aetolia-Acarnania after the Greek War of Independence in the late-1820s; the prefecture included Evrytania at the time, and it ranked second largest in Greece. Evrytania separated from the prefecture in 1948. In the 20th century, ferry services between Rio and the Peloponnese began. and in the 1950s and the 1960s ferry services began to incorporate vehicles. Following World War II and the Greek Civil War a number of buildings needed to be repaired.

A drawbridge linking the island of Lefkada was built in the 1960s. The prefecture's first reservoir, created by the Acheloos Dam over the Acheloos, was under construction in 1967 and completed in the early 1970s, delivering water and hydropower to western part of Greece. Villages were relocated at the time. Two more dams were added, the Stratos Hydroelectric Dam in the 1980s and another in the late 1980s.

== Transportation ==
The following years, the EO5 road bypassed Messolonghi and Agrinion and the EO38 became connected with paved road with Eurytania and Phthiotida. In the late-1980s, the by-pass of Naupaktos began construction but after paving the road, the signs did not appear and until 1998, it was left unopened. In 1999, the road was re-repaired and finally opened to traffic. In 2000, the construction of the Rio-Antirio or the Charilaos Trikoupis Bridge connecting the Peloponnese began construction and was opened to traffic in August 2004. The superhighway, the Ionia Odos (Ionian Motorway) which will run centrally bypassing communities began construction in 2001 at a part between Messolonghi and the curve, this section remains to be unpaved, the rest of the highway is in plan but the opening date is not yet set.

Today, there are two motorways in Aetolia-Acarnania: the A5, towards Ioannina and Patras; and the A52, towards Preveza. There are also eight national roads: the EO5, EO38, EO40 (a short airport road in Agrinio), EO42 and EO48; as well as the Agios Nikolaos–Actium, Igoumenitsa–Actium and Thermopylae–Antirrio national roads.

A railway formerly served the places from Kryoneri and Agrinio and served with the ferry with Rio. In the 1980s, the service came to an end.

== Population history ==
Historical population
Year	Pop.	±%
1981	218,362	—
1991	224,279	+2.7%
2001	219,092	−2.3%
2011	210,802	−3.8%
2021	192,345	−8.8%

== Administration ==
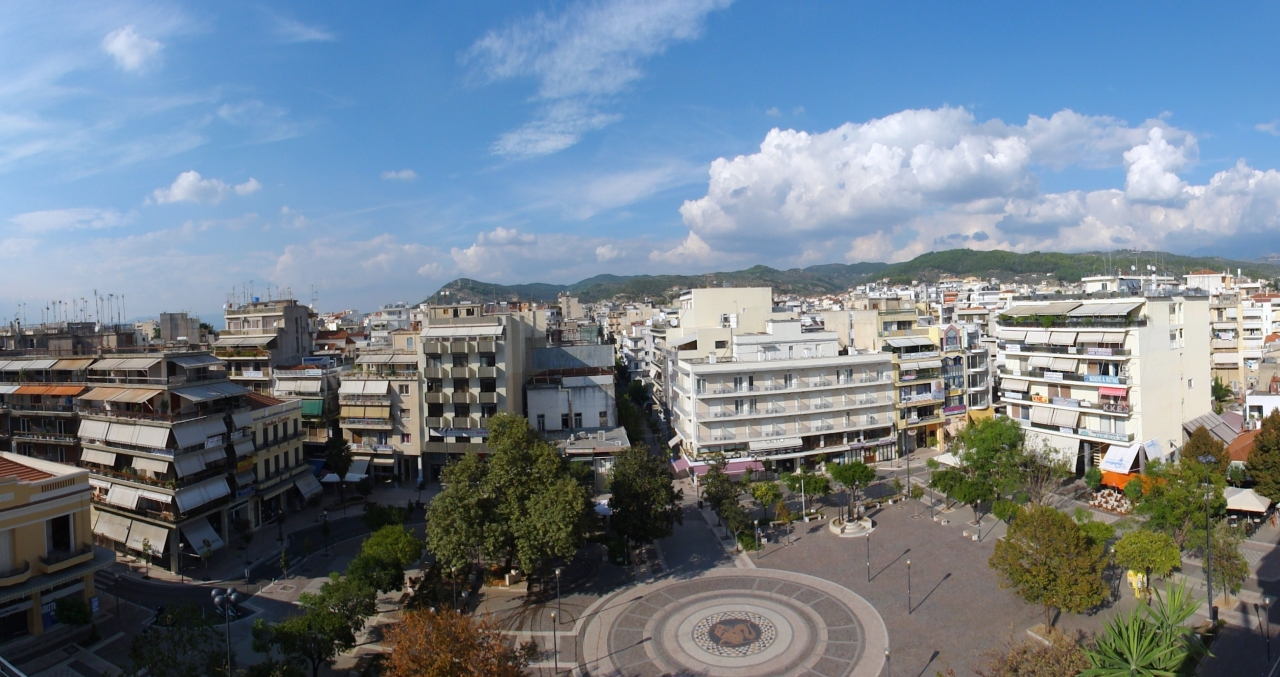
Agrinio

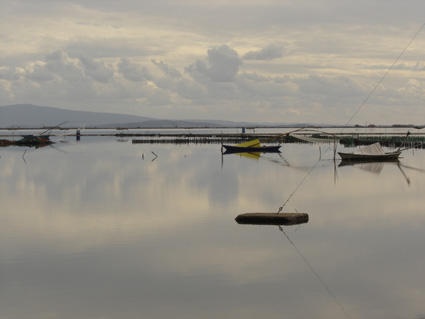
Messolongi lagoon

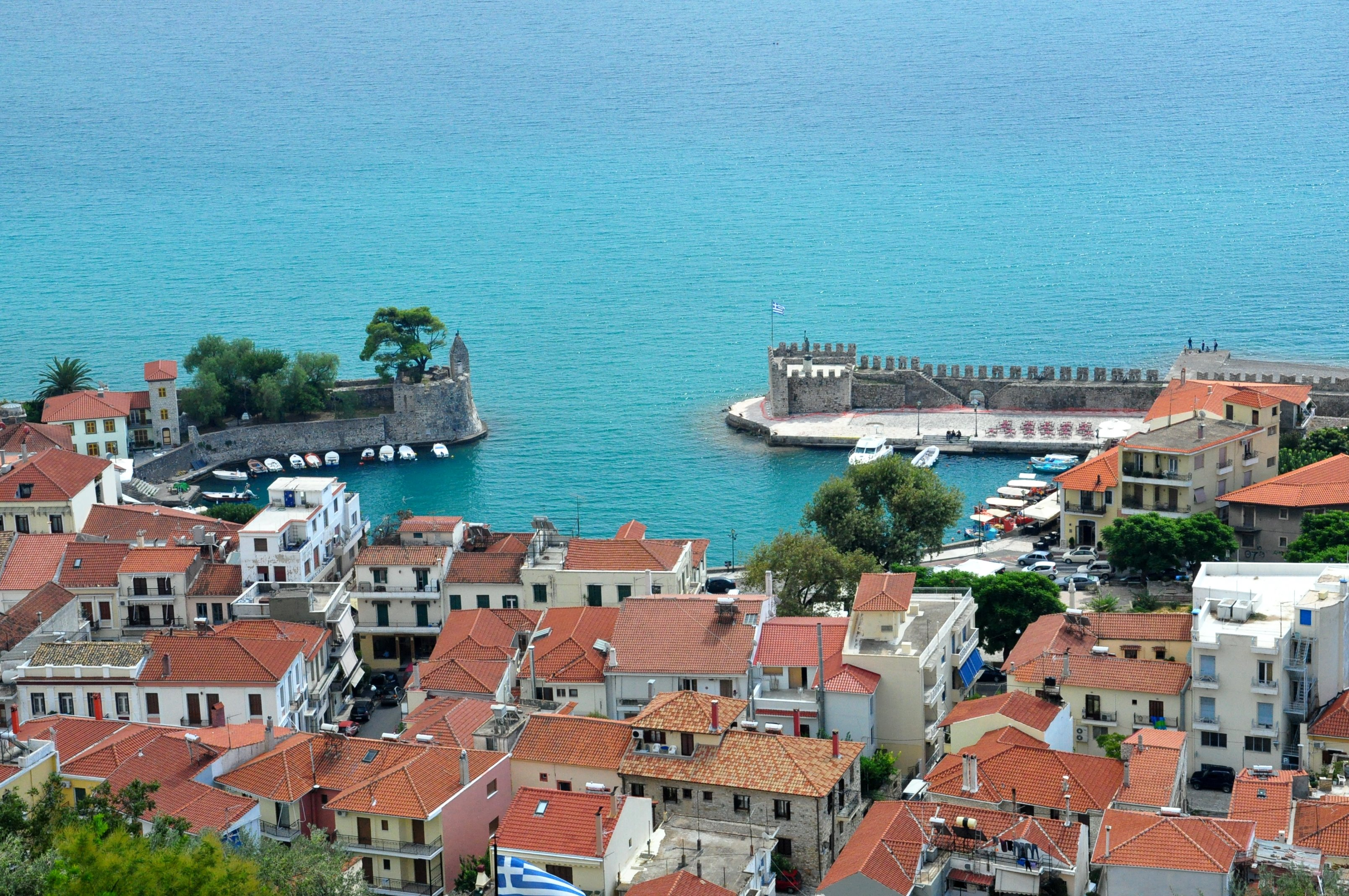
Nafpaktos

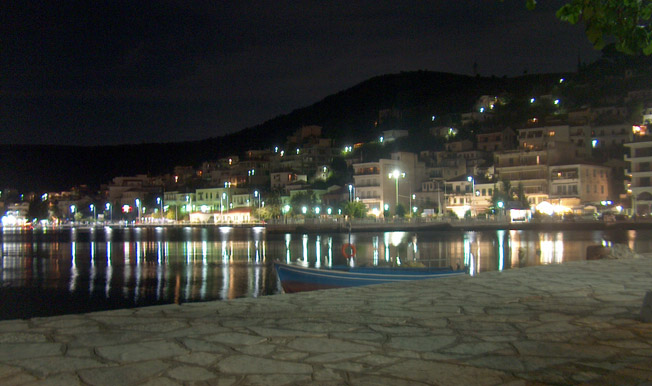
Amfilochia

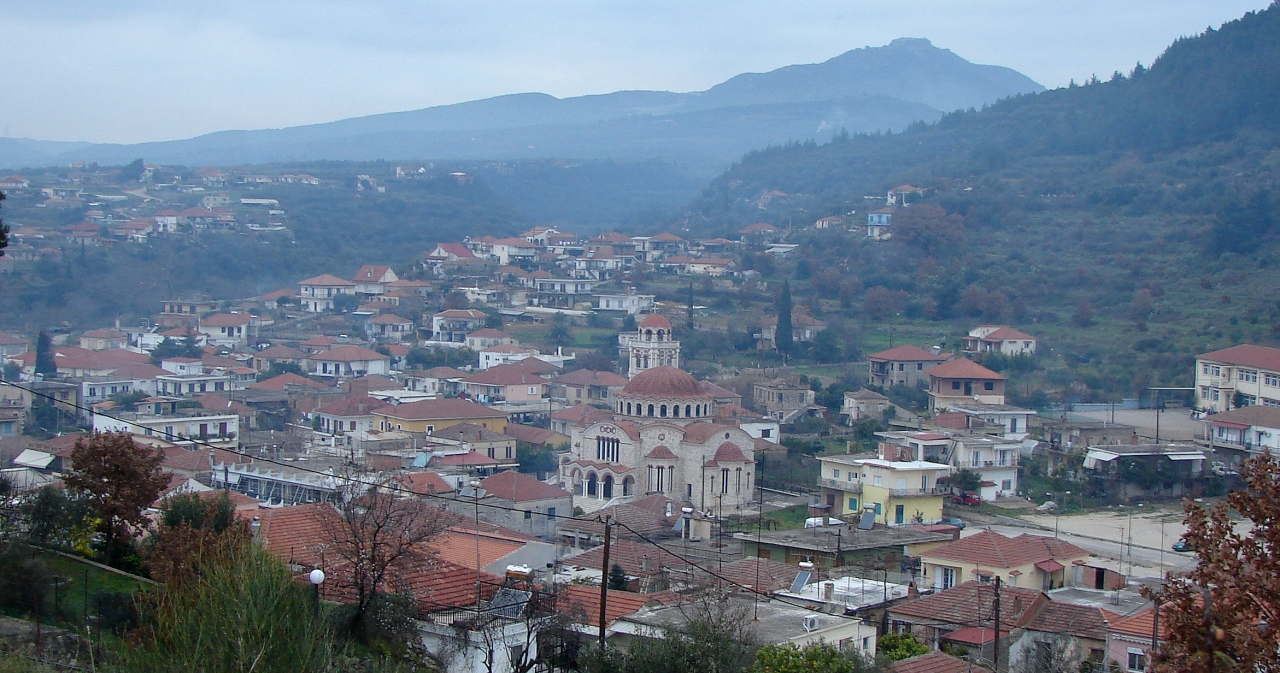
Paravola

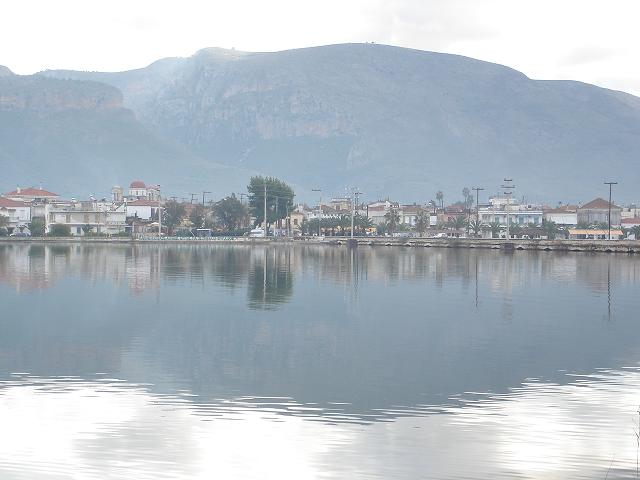
Aitoliko

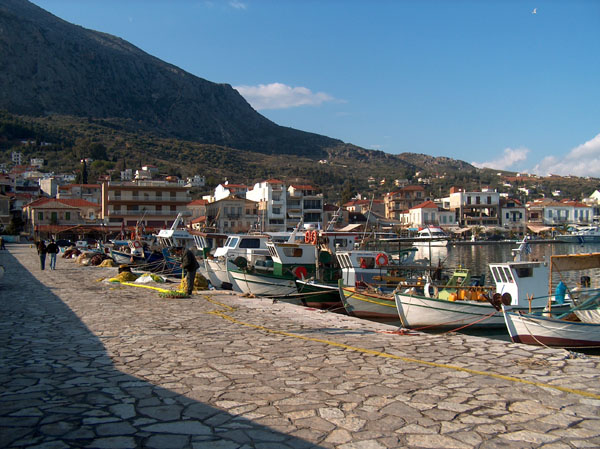
Astakos

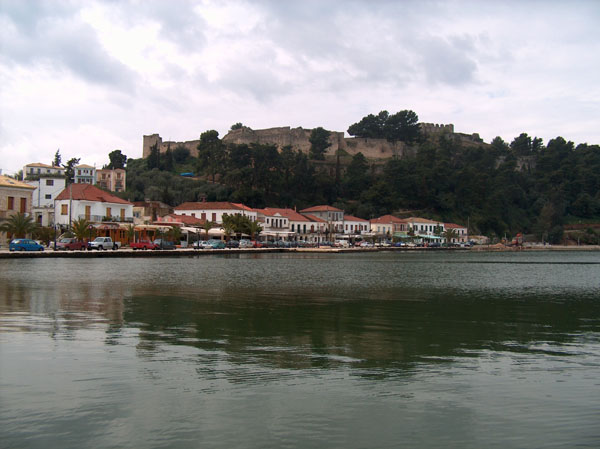
Vonitsa

The regional unit Aetolia-Acarnania is subdivided into 7 municipalities. These are (number in parentheses corresponds to number in the infobox's map):

- Agrinio (2)
- Aktio-Vonitsa (3)
- Amfilochia (4)
- Messolonghi (1)
- Nafpaktia (6)
- Thermo (5)
- Xiromero (7)

=== Prefecture ===
As a part of the 2011 Kallikratis government reform, the regional unit Aetolia-Acarnania was created out of the former prefecture Aetolia-Acarnania (Greek: Νομός Αιτωλοακαρνανίας). The prefecture had the same territory as the present regional unit. At the same time, the municipalities were reorganised, according to the table below.

New municipality	Old municipalities	Seat
Agrinio	Agrinio	Agrinio
Agrinio	Angelokastro	Agrinio
Agrinio	Arakynthos	Agrinio
Agrinio	Thestieis	Agrinio
Agrinio	Makryneia	Agrinio
Agrinio	Neapoli	Agrinio
Agrinio	Panaitoliko	Agrinio
Agrinio	Paravola	Agrinio
Agrinio	Parakampylia	Agrinio
Agrinio	Stratos	Agrinio
Aktio-Vonitsa	Anaktorio	Vonitsa
Aktio-Vonitsa	Medeon	Vonitsa
Aktio-Vonitsa	Palairos	Vonitsa
Amfilochia	Amfilochia	Amfilochia
Amfilochia	Inachos	Amfilochia
Amfilochia	Menidi	Amfilochia
Messolonghi (Mesolongi)	Messolonghi	Messolonghi
Messolonghi (Mesolongi)	Aitoliko	Messolonghi
Messolonghi (Mesolongi)	Oiniades	Messolonghi
Nafpaktia	Nafpaktos	Nafpaktos
Nafpaktia	Antirrio	Nafpaktos
Nafpaktia	Apodotia	Nafpaktos
Nafpaktia	Platanos	Nafpaktos
Nafpaktia	Pyllini	Nafpaktos
Nafpaktia	Chalkeia	Nafpaktos
Thermo	Thermo	Thermo
Xiromero	Astakos	Astakos
Xiromero	Alyzia	Astakos
Xiromero	Fyteies	Astakos

=== Provinces ===
- Province of Messolonghi - Messolonghi/Messolongi
- Province of Nafpaktia - Nafpaktos
- Province of Trichonida - Agrinio
- Province of Valtos - Amfilochia
- Province of Vonitsa & Xiromero - Vonitsa

Note: Provinces no longer hold any legal status in Greece.

== Notable people ==
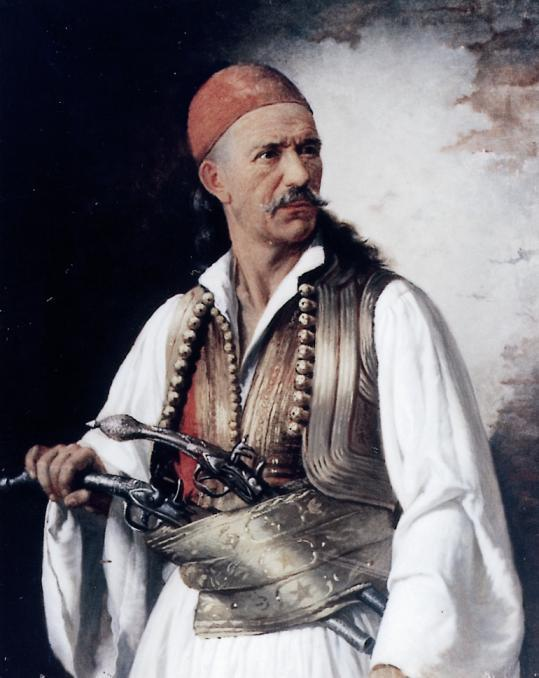
Dimitrios Makris (c. 1772 – 1841) a native of Aetolia was a Greek chief klepht, armatole, military commander and fighter of the 1821 Greek war of independence

- Cosmas of Aetolia, (1714–1779) monk
- Dimitrios Makris, fighter of the Greek War of Independence (1821)
- Aristovoulos Kois, Greek army officer from Agrinio, Greece.
- Maria Dimadi, member of EAM during Greek resistance
- Stratos Apostolakis - footballer
- Georgios Athanasiadis-Novas - a former Greek prime minister
- Filipos Darlas, footballer
- Ioannis Kalogeras
- Christos Kapralos, writer
- Pantelis Karasevdas
- Aristidis Moschos, musician
- Thodoros Papadimitriou, sculptor
- Pythagoras Papastamatiou, director, songwrite
- Evangelos Papastratos
- Charilaos Trikoupis - a former Greek Prime Minister
- Spyridon Trikoupis - a former Greek Prime Minister
- Dimitrios Valvis - a former Greek Prime Minister
- Zinovios Valvis - a former Greek Prime Minister
- Yannis Yfantis - poet

== Communications ==
=== Radio ===
- Agrinio 93.7 FM
- Dytika FM
- Stereo Channel
- Akarnania Radio

=== Television ===
- Acheloos TV - Agrinion
- Lychnos, UHF channel 32 (religious), broadcasting from Nafpaktos
- Lepanto Tv - Nafpaktos
- Ν TV - Agrinion

=== Newspapers ===
- 29Dytika
- Akarnania
- En Bambini - Bambini
- Nea Epohi
- Vela

== Sporting teams ==
- Panetolikos - Agrinio, Super League Greece
- Panagriniakos - Agrinio, Gamma Ethniki
- Nafpaktiakos Asteras - Nafpaktos, Local Championship
- A.E. Messolonghi - Messolonghi, Local Championship
- Aris Aitoliko - Aitoliko, Local Championship
- Thyella Paravolas - Paravola, Local Championship
- Neos Amfilochos - Amfilochia, Local Championship
- Doxa Kainourgiou - Kainourgio, Local Championship

== See also ==
- List of settlements in Aetolia-Acarnania
