= List of settlements in Aetolia-Acarnania =

This is a list of settlements in Aetolia-Acarnania, Greece.

- Achladokastro
- Achyra
- Aetopetra
- Aetos
- Afrato
- Afroxylia
- Agalianos
- Agia Paraskevi
- Agia Sofia
- Agia Varvara
- Agios Andreas
- Agios Dimitrios
- Agios Georgios
- Agios Ilias
- Agios Konstantinos
- Agios Nikolaos Trichonidos
- Agios Nikolaos
- Agios Thomas
- Agios Vlasios
- Agrampela
- Agridi
- Agrinio
- Aitoliko
- Akres
- Alevrada
- Amfilochia
- Amorgianoi
- Ampelaki
- Ampelakiotissa
- Ampelia
- Amvrakia
- Analipsi
- Anavryti
- Angelokastro
- Ano Chora
- Ano Kerasovo
- Ano Koudouni
- Ano Vasiliki
- Anoixiatiko
- Anthofyto
- Antirrio
- Arachova
- Archontochori
- Argyro Pigadi
- Aspria
- Astakos
- Avarikos
- Bampalio
- Bampini
- Chaliki Amvrakias
- Chalkiopoulo
- Chomori
- Chouni
- Chrysovergi
- Chrysovitsa
- Chrysovitsa
- Dafni
- Dafnias
- Dendrochori
- Diasellaki
- Diplatanos
- Dokimi
- Dorvitsa
- Drymonas
- Drymos
- Elaiofyto
- Elatou
- Elatovrysi
- Eleftheriani
- Ellinika
- Empesos
- Evinochori
- Famila
- Floriada
- Fragkoulaiika
- Fyteies
- Galatas
- Gavalou
- Gavrolimni
- Gavros
- Giannopouloi
- Gouria
- Gouriotissa
- Grammatikou
- Grammeni Oxya
- Grigori
- Kainourgio
- Kalavrouza
- Kallithea
- Kalloni
- Kaloudi
- Kalyvia
- Kamaroula
- Kandila
- Kapsorachi
- Karaiskakis
- Kastanea
- Kastanoula
- Kastraki
- Katafygio
- Kato Chora
- Kato Chrysovitsa
- Kato Kerasovo
- Kato Makrinou
- Katochi
- Katouna
- Kechrinia
- Kentriki
- Kerasea
- Kleisorrevmata
- Klepa
- Kokkinochori
- Kokkinovrysi
- Kompoti
- Koniska
- Konopina
- Kryoneria
- Kydonea
- Kyparissos
- Kypseli
- Kyra Vgena
- Lampiri
- Lefka
- Lefko
- Lepenou
- Lesini
- Limnitsa
- Livadaki
- Loutraki
- Loutro
- Lygias
- Lysimacheia
- Machairas
- Makrinou
- Makyneia
- Malesiada
- Mamoulada
- Manina Vlizianon
- Mandrini
- Mastro
- Mataragka
- Matsouki
- Megali Chora
- Megas Kampos
- Menidi
- Mesarista
- Milea
- Missolonghi
- Molykreio
- Monastiraki
- Mousoura
- Myrtea
- Mytikas
- Naupactus
- Nea Avorani
- Neapoli
- Neochori, Missolonghi
- Neochori, Nafpaktia
- Neokastro
- Nerochori
- Neromanna
- Ochthia
- Palaiochoraki
- Palaiokarya
- Palaiomanina
- Palaiopyrgos
- Palairos
- Paliampela
- Pamfio
- Panagoula
- Panaitolio
- Pantanassa
- Papadates
- Papadatou
- Paravola
- Patiopoulo
- Pentakorfo
- Pentalofo
- Peratia
- Perdikaki
- Perdikovrysi
- Perista
- Peristeri
- Perithori
- Perkos
- Petrochori
- Petrona
- Pitsinaiika
- Plagia
- Platanos
- Podogora
- Podos
- Pogonia
- Pokista
- Potamoula Messolongiou
- Potamoula
- Prodromos
- Prosilia
- Psilovrachos
- Retsina
- Rigani
- Riganio
- Sardinia
- Sargiada
- Sidira
- Simos
- Sitaralona
- Sitomena
- Skala
- Skourtou
- Skoutera
- Skoutesiada
- Spartias
- Sparto
- Spolaita
- Stamna
- Stanos
- Stathas
- Stranoma
- Stratos
- Strongylovouni
- Stylia
- Terpsithea
- Thermo
- Thyrio
- Trichonio
- Triklino
- Trikorfo
- Tryfos
- Varetada
- Varnakas
- Vasiliki
- Vasilopoulo
- Vatos
- Velvina
- Vlachomandra
- Vliziana
- Vomvokou
- Vonitsa
- Vrouviana
- Xiropigado
- Zevgaraki

== See also ==
- List of towns and villages in Greece
