= Karakostas =

Karakostas (Greek: Καρακώστας) is a surname. Notable people with the surname include:

- Giorgos Karakostas (born 1984), Greek footballer
- Nikos Karakostas (born 1976), Greek footballer
- Pavlos Karakostas (1937–2002), Greek author
