= Alevrada =

Alevrada Αλευράδα
- Community
- Location within Greece
- Coordinates: 38°55.7′N 21°26.3′E
- Country: Greece
- Administrative region: West Greece
- Regional unit: Aetolia-Acarnania
- Municipality: Amfilochia
- Municipal unit: Inachos

Population (2021)
  - Community: 84
- Time zone: UTC+2 (EET)
  - Summer (DST): UTC+3 (EEST)

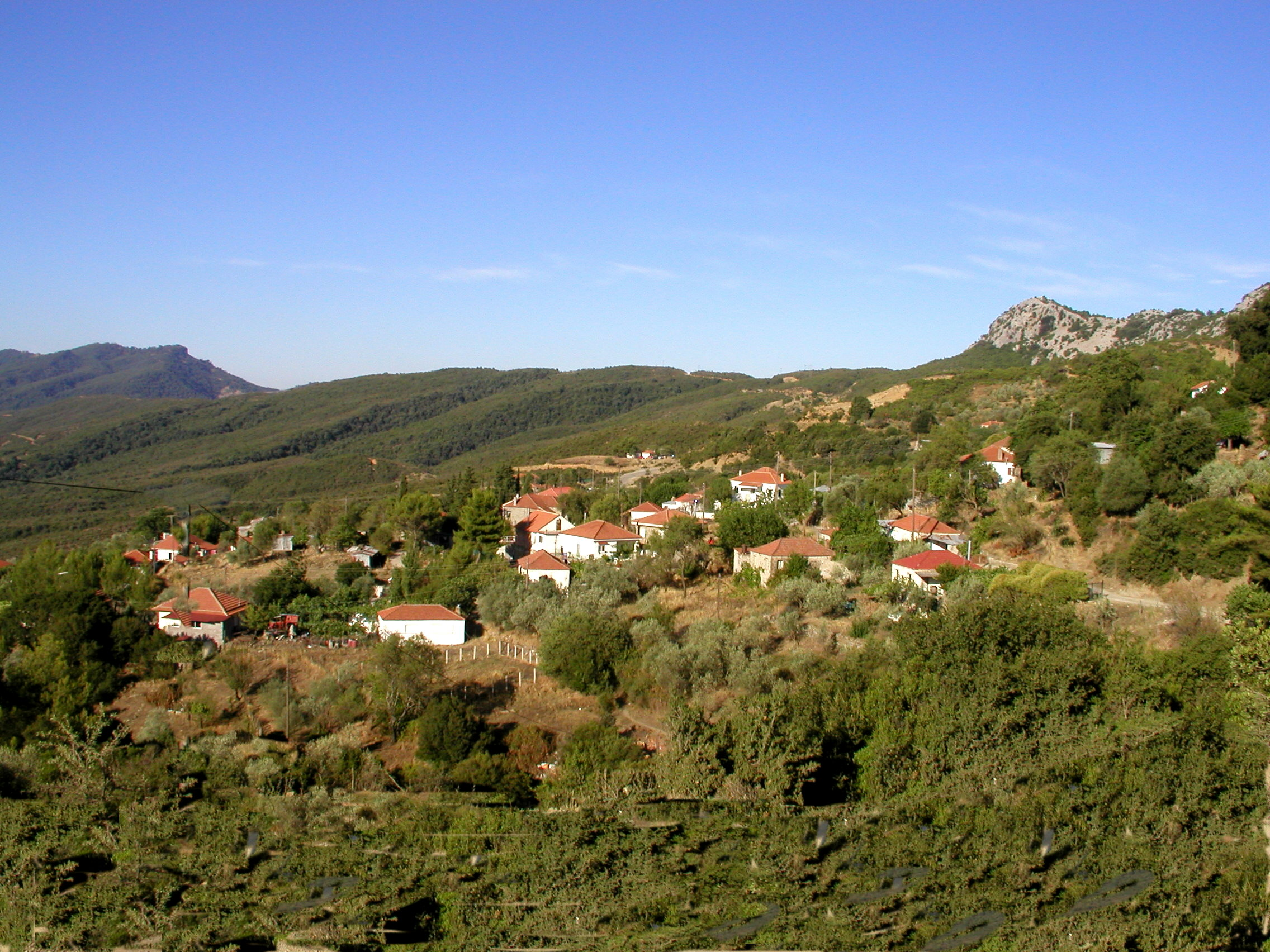
Alevrada

Alevrada (Greek: Αλευράδα) is a small village and a community in northern Aetolia-Acarnania, Greece. It belongs to the municipality of Amfilochia. Together with the smaller villages Pistiana and Kremasta Sykias, it forms the community Alevrada.

== Geography ==
The village Alevrada is situated 3 km west of the artificial lake Kremasta, at 573 m above sea level. Pistiana is about 1 km to the east, on the road to the Tatarna Bridge. Kremasta Sykias is 6 km to the southeast, near the Kremasta Dam. The nearest larger village is Chalkiopoulo, 11 km to the northwest. Amfilochia is 45 km to the west.

== History ==
Alevrada appears as a community immediately after the Greek war of independence and the arrival of King Otto. The origin of the name "Alevrada" is unknown. It may be derived from the Greek Alevri (which means flour) because of the flour mills which were scattered across the banks of the river Achelous. Another interpretation is that a person with the surname "Alevradas" was the first inhabitant of the place. The villagers cultivated corn fields due to the abundance of water from the river, so there was plenty of corn flour which can explain the name "Alevrada" (the village which has a lot of alevri = flour). During the war for independence there were very few people living in the area, mostly shepherds. At that time the village was 2 kilometers from its current location. The name "palichoraki = old village" reminds this event. (More information is in the book "Alevrada", edited by Kostas Papaioannou 2007, see below.)

== Historical population ==
Year	Population village	Population community
1961	276	684
1981	-	794
1991	185	301
2001	101	151
2011	90	124
2021	54	84

== See also ==
- List of settlements in Aetolia-Acarnania
