= Bampini =

Village in Acarnania, Greece

Bampini Μπαμπίνη
- Community
- Location within Greece
- Coordinates: 38°39.6′N 21°8.8′E
- Country: Greece
- Administrative region: West Greece
- Regional unit: Aetolia-Acarnania
- Municipality: Xiromero
- Municipal unit: Astakos
- Elevation: 200 m (660 ft)

Population (2021)
  - Community: 307
- Time zone: UTC+2 (EET)
  - Summer (DST): UTC+3 (EEST)
- Postal code: 300 09
- Area code: 26460

Bampini (Greek: Μπαμπίνη) is a village located in the northern part of the municipal unit of Astakos in the western part of Aetolia-Acarnania, Greece. It is located on a hillside, 5 km southeast of Fyteies, 15 km northeast of Astakos, 23 km south of Amfilochia and 23 km west of Agrinio. Agriculture is the most important land use around Bampini.

== Historical population ==
| Year | Population |
|---|---|
| 1981 | 528 |
| 1991 | 467 |
| 2001 | 418 |
| 2011 | 413 |
| 2021 | 307 |

== See also ==
- List of settlements in Aetolia-Acarnania
