= 3/40 Evzone Regiment =

3/40 Evzone Regiment, 40th Evzone Regiment
- 3/40 Σύνταγμα Ευζώνων
- Active: 1913–?
- Country: Greece
- Type: elite light infantry
- Garrison/HQ: Arta
- Battle honours: Balkan Wars, Macedonian front, Greco-Turkish War of 1919–1922, Greco-Italian War, Greek Civil War

Commanders
- Notable commanders: Alexandros Kontoulis, Thrasyvoulos Tsakalotos

The 3/40 Evzone Regiment (Greek: 3/40 Σύνταγμα Ευζώνων, abbrev. 3/40 ΣΕ) or 40th Evzone Regiment (40° Σύνταγμα Ευζώνων, 40 ΣΕ) is a historic regiment of Evzones of the Hellenic Army, recruited in Epirus and headquartered in Arta. It was formed in 1913 after the Balkan Wars, and disbanded in the post-World War II period. It exists today as a nominal reserve formation to be mobilized in wartime.

== History ==
The regiment traces its ancestry to the 3rd Evzone Battalion (3ο Τάγμα Ευζώνων), which was formed at Arta during the mobilization in the lead-up to the Greco-Turkish War of 1897. The battalion, commanded by Colonel Papadimas, was placed under the 1st Infantry Brigade. On the outbreak of hostilities on 5 April 1897, the battalion was deployed along the front, between Pournari and the Arta toll station. Along with the rest of the Greek forces in the Epirus front, the battalion crossed the Arachthos River and occupied the village of Koumtzades (modern Ammotopos) on the 10th. It fought in the three-day Battle of Pente Pigadia (15–17 April) against strongly fortified Ottoman positions. The conflict was concluded on 6 May with a ceasefire.

=== Balkan Wars ===
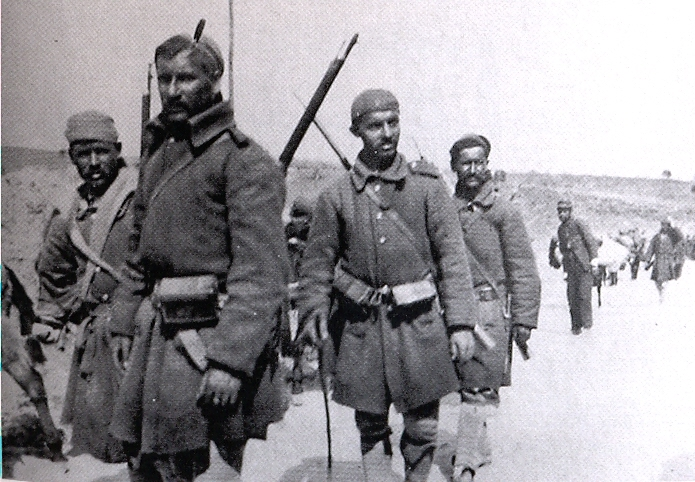
Evzones near Ioannina, spring 1913

Under the command of Lt. Colonel Alexandros Kontoulis, the 3rd Evzone Battalion took part in the First Balkan War, following Greek advance in the Epirus front during the autumn of 1912 up to Kleisoura and Tepeleni, in modern Albania. In April 1913, the battalion was moved to Boemitsa in Macedonia, due to the looming conflict with Bulgaria, Greece's ally in the First Balkan War, over the division of the spoils. There the battalion was expanded into the 3rd Evzone Regiment, numbered 40th among the infantry regiments, and placed under the 10th Infantry Division. Already before the outbreak of the Second Balkan War, the regiment fought against Bulgarian probing skirmishes at Karasouli, leaving an officer and two NCOs dead. After the outbreak of hostilities, the 3/40 Regiment covered the left flank of the Greek army and fought in the battles of Doiran, Strumica, up to the area of Pehčevo, where the regiment distinguished itself in the hard-fought battle around Height 1900.

After the end of hostilities, the regiment returned to Arta. During the mobilization of 1915, it was transferred to the Pangaion Hills area in Macedonia, but returned to Arta following demobilization. With the National Schism and the disintegration of the Greek army loyal to the royal government, the 3/40 Regiment too was virtually disbanded.

=== World War I and Greco-Turkish War ===
Following the entry of Greece in World War I in June 1917, the regiment was reconstituted, under the 9th Infantry Division. From September 1918 until the war's end it fought in the Florina–Monastir area. In spring 1919, the 9th Division was transferred to eastern Macedonia. During the Greek occupation of Western Thrace in October 1919, the regiment occupied Xanthi. In summer 1920 it participated in the operations to capture Eastern Thrace, where it occupied Karaağaç and led the storming of Adrianople on 8–11 July 1920.

In spring 1921, the regiment was transferred to the Asia Minor front, disembarking at Mudanya on 17 March. The Evzones were quickly deployed to the area of Bursa, where itheir arrival thwarted a planned uprising by the Turkish population. The regiment took over the front sector around Tsongara, as well as conducting anti-guerrilla operations in the mountainous area of Uludağ. On 22 April, the regiment was withdrawn to be redeployed to Smyrna, being replaced by the 12th Infantry Regiment. After a three-day stay for recuperation in the city, on 1 May the regiment was moved by train southeast, to take over the Maeander River-Buldan sector.

On 11 June, the 1st Battalion was moved north of Uşak as part of a mixed detachment under Colonel Vlasios Tsirogiannis, to take part in the operation to capture Kütahya and Eskişehir, which began on 27 June. With the success of the Greek offensive, on 22 July the remainder of the regiment was removed from Buldan and moved to the front. During the crossing of the arid Central Anatolian Steppe, while the regiment was moving to link up with its parent 9th Division, it was attacked by the 9th Turkish Cavalry Division at Aziziye (modern Emirdağ), but repelled the attack. After a 580 km march in 22 days, the regiment arrived at the front at Kale Groto on 14 August.

=== Greco-Italian War and Axis Occupation ===
In 1924, the regiment's garrison was temporarily moved to Ioannina, and then, now as the 40th Evzone Regiment, to Preveza. On 1 August 1929 it was reorganized as the 40th Evzone Battalion (40ον Τάγμα Ευζώνων), and its base was once again moved to Arta. It was restored to regimental size soon after.

At the time of the outbreak of the Greco-Italian War in October 1940, the 3/40 Evzone Regiment, under Col. Thrasyvoulos Tsakalotos, was part of the 8th Infantry Division, commanded by Maj. General Charalambos Katsimitros. Facing the brunt of the initial Italian offensive, in the first days of the war the regiment withdrew behind the Kalamas River. After the Italian offensive was halted on 7 November, the regiment took part in the Greek counter-offensive, recapturing Granitsopoula (10 November), Kato Lavdani, Stratinitsa (18 November), Kerasovo (19 November), and the Kastaniani-Valtista heights (23–24 November). After crossing the pre-war border, it advanced into Albania, capturing the villages of Pepel (26 November) and Vodhinë (28 November), and the Galisht heights (12 December). The regiment then fought a ten-day battle (12–22 December) to capture Mount Kuç against determined Italian resistance. Italian casualties were heavy: the 51st Division's 31st Infantry Regiment was destroyed as a fighting force, and the 141st Blackshirt Battalion was taken prisoner. The regiment went on to capture the villages of Kallarat, Vranisht, and Bolenë on 22–28 December. The regiment received the highest Greek award for valour, the Commander's Cross of the Cross of Valour, after recommendation on 16 February 1941 by the commander of the 3rd Infantry Division, Maj. General Bakos.

Following the German invasion of Greece on 6 April 1941, the Italian forces opposite the Greek army in Albania began probing attacks on the Greek positions. On 8 April, the 3rd Battalion faced an Italian reconnaissance attack near Bolenë, followed on 14 and 15 April by a series of determined attacks with heavy artillery support against the positions of both the 1st and the 3rd Battalions. The Italian attacks were repulsed, but due to the German advance in Macedonia, the Greek army in Albania began retreating as well. The 40th Regiment began retreating on 16–17 April, assuming new defensive positions near Krania on 18 April. The retreat recommenced on the night of the 21st, and the Regiment arrived at Parapotamos, on the Greek side of the pre-war border, on the 23rd. Through forced marches, the unit reached Preveza four days later, where it was disbanded and the men released to return to their homes.

During the Axis Occupation of Greece, the two largest armed resistance groups, the leftist EAM-ELAS, and the right-wing EDES, both formed their own units named after the regiment. The EDES unit, formed on 10 October 1942 in the region of Tzoumerka, was commanded by the Cavalry Major Georgios Agoros. In July–October 1943 it took part in sabotage and attacks on German forces as part of the diversionary operations in preparation for the Allied invasion of Sicily, as well as in the quasi-civil war with ELAS forces during autumn 1943. In early July 1944 it fought against the Germans around Preveza, and then in the Battle of Menina on 17–18 August 1944. The ELAS regiment took part in the Battle of Amfilochia on 12–14 July 1944, one of ELAS' largest operations during the Occupation.

=== Greek Civil War and post-war period ===
Following the liberation of Greece, EDES was disbanded, and the southern part of the Epirus region came under the control of the 84th Military Region (84 Στρατιωτική Περιοχή), established in March 1945. The formation had a minimal strength, mostly comprising the 581st Infantry Battalion. During the Greek Civil War of 1946–49, the battalion fought in the Battle of Konitsa in July 1947, before forming part of the newly constituted 76th Brigade (76η Ταξιαρχία) on 6 September, along with the 625th Infantry Battalion. From 13 January 1948, the 76th Brigade assumed responsibility over Thesprotia, with the 581st, 625th, and 611th Battalions. In early March and again in August–September 1948 it led the anti-partisan sweeps in the Mourgana area. In sprin 1949 the entire Brigade was moved to the area of Mount Grammos, where it participated in the last battles of the civil war. The 581st Battalion in particular distinguished itself during the conflict, being used often in a fire brigade or rapid reaction force, such as in the Battle of Karpenisi in January 1949.

On 15 April 1951, the 76th Brigade was renamed as the 40th Evzone Regiment. On 25 June 1951, Queen Frederica was named its honorary colonel-in-chief, as a result of which the regiment bore her royal monogram on the shoulder straps.

== Casualties ==
In the wars between 1912 and 1949, the regiment suffered 35 officers dead and 35 wounded, and 224 other ranks dead and 647 wounded, as well as 41 missing in action.

== Sources ==
- Συνοπτική Ιστορία Συντάγματος [Concise Regimental History] (in Greek), Hellenic Army General Staff, Army History Directorate, 28 December 1962
