= Manina Vlizianon =

Manina Vlizianon Μάνινα Βλιζιανών
- Settlement
- Location within Greece
- Coordinates: 38°32.2′N 21°11.4′E
- Country: Greece
- Administrative region: West Greece
- Regional unit: Aetolia-Acarnania
- Municipality: Xiromero
- Municipal unit: Astakos
- Community: Strongylovouni
- Elevation: 80 m (260 ft)

Population (2021)
  - Total: 148
- Time zone: UTC+2 (EET)
  - Summer (DST): UTC+3 (EEST)
- Postal code: 300 01
- Area code: +30-2632
- Vehicle registration: AI, ME

Manina Vlizianon (Greek: Μάνινα Βλιζιανών, Aromanian: Calendzi) is an Aromanian (Vlach) village in Xiromero municipality, Greece. The 2021 census recorded 148 residents in the village. The community of Manina Vlizianon is a part of the community of Strongylovouni.

== History ==
Manina Vlizianon, together with the other Vlach settlements of Aetolia-Acarnania, was created in the midst of the 19th century, by people that fled the village of Bitsikopoulo, in Epirus, after a string of assaults by Turkish and Albanian bandits.

== See also ==
- List of settlements in Aetolia-Acarnania
