= Herescu =

Herescu of Herescul is a Romanian-language surname. Notable people with this surname include:

- Constantin Năsturel-Herescu (1798-1879), Romanian general and philanthropist
- Dosoftei Herescu (Dositei Herescul) (1710-1789), Romanian Orthodox bishop
- Niculae I. Herescu (1906-1961), Romanian classical scholar, essayist, translator and poet
- Nadia Gray, Nadia Kujnir-Herescu (1923-1994), Romanian film actress
- A Wallachian boyar Herescu was among the ancestors of Russian poet Mikhail Kheraskov
- Ilie Herescul, starosta ("elder") of Czernowitz (1771-1773) succeeding Léon d'Ymbault
