= Aitoliko =

Aitoliko Αιτωλικό
- Municipal unit
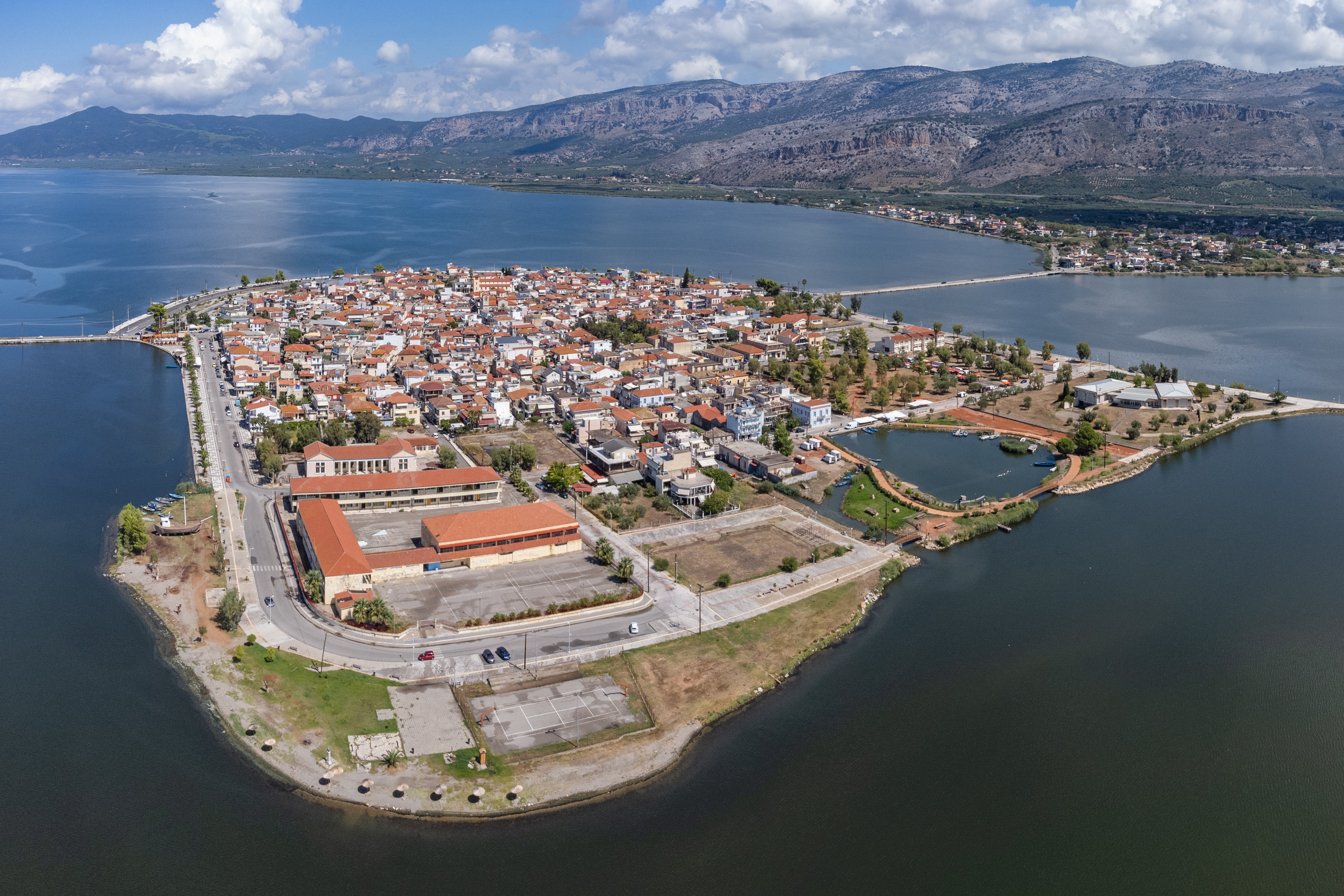
- Aitoliko

- Location within the regional unit

- Location within Greece
- Coordinates: 38°27′N 21°22′E
- Country: Greece
- Administrative region: West Greece
- Regional unit: Aetolia-Acarnania
- Municipality: Messolonghi

Area
  - Municipal unit: 129.3 km^{2} (49.9 sq mi)
- Elevation: 6 m (20 ft)

Population (2021)
  - Municipal unit: 6,215
  - Municipal unit density: 48.07/km^{2} (124.5/sq mi)
  - Community: 4,813
- Time zone: UTC+2 (EET)
  - Summer (DST): UTC+3 (EEST)
- Postal code: 304 00
- Area code: 26320
- Vehicle registration: ME

Aitoliko (Greek: Αιτωλικό) is a town and a former municipality in Aetolia-Acarnania, West Greece, Greece. Since the 2011 local government reform, it is part of the municipality Messolonghi, of which it is a municipal unit. The municipal unit has an area of 129,305 m^{2}. It is located north of the Acheloos delta. The Greek National Road 5/E55 passes through the municipal unit. It is located SW of Agrinion, about 20 km NW of Messolonghi, W of Nafpaktos and the Rio-Antirrio bridge and SE of Astakos. Until it became a part of Greece, it was known as Anatoliko (Ανατολικό), meaning eastern.

== Subdivisions ==
The municipal unit Aitoliko is subdivided into the following communities (constituent villages in brackets):

- Aitoliko (Aitoliko, Agios Nikolaos, Kefalovryso, Mesa Pigadi, Bouza, Nisaki, Poros, Chaliki)
- Agios Ilias
- Stamna (Stamna, Kefalovrysos, Stathmos Stamnas)
- Fragkoulaiika (Fragkou, Koulaiika)
- Chrysovergi (Chrysovergi, Giatsaiika)

== Historical population ==
Year	Community population	Municipal unit population
1981	5,265	-
2001	5,472	7,348
2011	4,935	6,561
2021	4,813	6,215

Aitoliko has primary schools, a high school (first three years of secondary education), a Lyceum (the second three-year period of secondary education), several churches, a small post office and a central square.

The geography has rocky bushy hills to the east and farms along with some grasslands and swamps as far as the Achelous to the west.

The Aitoliko Lagoon is a lagoon located east of Aitoliko surrounding the main municipality and is 14 km^{2} in area.

Aitoliko was located with relation to the ancient towns of Pleuron and Oiniadai. The name of the town in the middle of the lagoon dates back to ancient times.

The old part of the town lies on an island between two lagoons; the Aitoliko Lagoon, which extends up to Stamna, lies to the north, and the Missolonghi Lagoon, which was Lake Kynia in antiquity lies to the south and connects with Gulf of Patras and into the Ionian Sea. The island is connected to the mainland on each side by two bridges.

== The delta and the lagoons ==
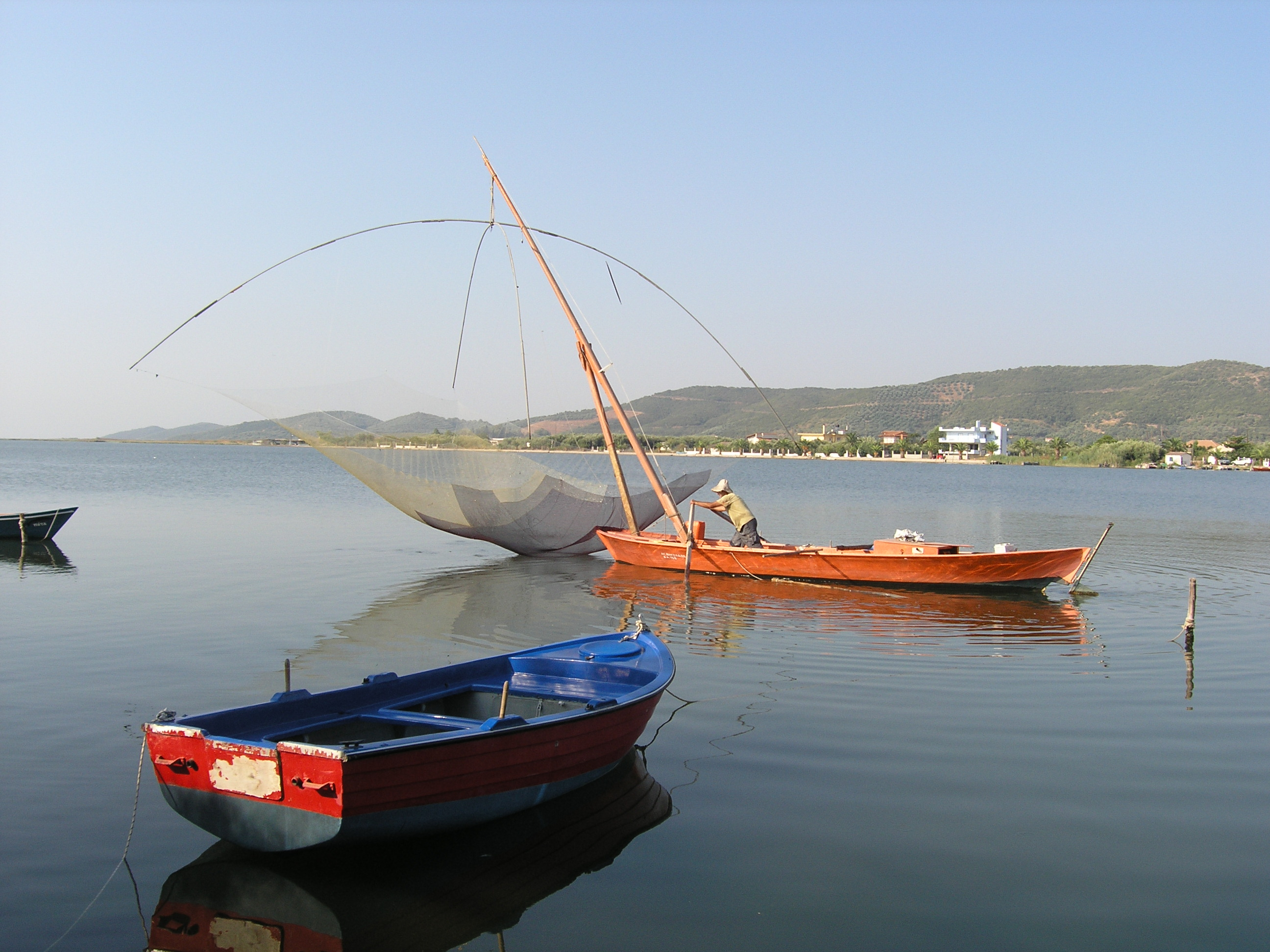
Fishermen

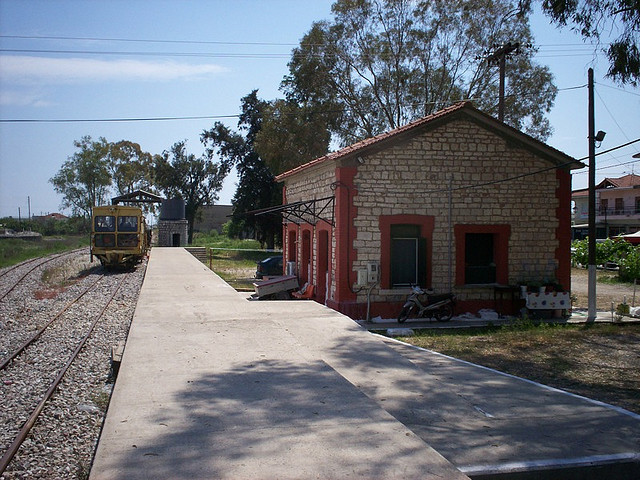
Railway station

The Achelous delta to be found west of Mesolonghi is the most extensive delta in Greece. The Mesolonghi lagoon is one of the largest lagoons of the entire Mediterranean Sea with its depth of 1.5 m. It is separated from the Gulf of Patras while its sea water is renewed from the Gulf; whereas the Aitolikon lagoon is much deeper at 30 m deep.

Of economic importance is the saltworks located to the east next to the EO5 road (Agrinion–Mesolonghi) about 100 m from the sea with an area of about 500 m^{2} and a width of about 1 km between Aitolikon and Mesolonghi. Farmlands lie to the east with hills and rocky landscape. Fishing is common in the lagoon. The lagoons are the richest waters in Greece as far as fish are concerned. Here, boats are used. In different places, wooden huts on stilts can be seen. Land development and waste management endanger the entire delta area. A large tract of land is under nature protection and hunting is banned. In this area, 170 species of birds are found.

It is also home to some parasites including isopods and sand smelts including Atherina boyeri.

== History ==
Around 900 A.D, the Byzantine fleet from Naupaktos (Lepanto) at the Gulf of Corinth became the capital and was named Nikopolis. The new capital became secured by the fortress. One of these fortresses were favourable for defense on the island and the lagoons in Aitoliko. Since the 12th century, the island fortress of Anatoliko developed into a city. In 1406, it was sold to Carlo I Tocco of Kefallinia. The Venetian forces divided their incomes from the salt gardens and fishing waters of Anatoliko which lasted until 1430.

During the Greek War of Independence against the Ottoman Empire, in the beginning of the 19th century, Aitolikon experienced three Turkish sieges before it became a part of Greece. There were 500 Greek defenders and 15,000 Turks in the first siege. The second siege was repelled, and in the third siege, Aitolikon was re-taken by the Turks at the same time as Mesolonghi on April 11, 1826. Generals from Greece that participated included Georgios Liakatas.

== Notable people ==
- Vaso Katraki, Engraver - Painter, 1914–1988
- Giannis Vogiatzis (b.1926), actor

== See also ==
- List of settlements in Aetolia-Acarnania
