= Strongylovouni =

Strongylovouni Στρογγυλοβούνι Sturnari
- Settlement
- Location within Greece
- Coordinates: 38°31.7′N 21°12.8′E
- Country: Greece
- Administrative region: West Greece
- Regional unit: Aetolia-Acarnania
- Municipality: Xiromero
- Municipal unit: Astakos
  - Community: 18.001 km^{2} (6.950 sq mi)
- Elevation: 106 m (348 ft)

Population (2021)
  - Community: 319
  - Community density: 17.7/km^{2} (45.9/sq mi)
- Time zone: UTC+2 (EET)
  - Summer (DST): UTC+3 (EEST)
- Postal code: 300 01
- Area code: +30-2632
- Vehicle registration: AI, ME

Strongylovouni (Greek: Στρογγυλοβούνι; Aromanian: Sturnari) is an Aromanian village and a community of the Xiromero municipality. Since the 2011 local government reform it was part of the municipality Astakos, of which it was a municipal district. The 2021 census recorded 319 residents in the community. The community of Strongylovouni covers an area of 18.001 km^{2}.

== Administrative division ==
The community of Strongylovouni consists of two separate settlements:

- Manina Vlizianon (population 148 as of 2021)
- Strongylovouni (population 171)

== History ==
Strongylovouni, together with the other Aromanian settlements of Aetolia-Acarnania, was created in the midst of the 19th century, by people that fled the village of Mpitsikopoulo, in Epirus, after a string of assaults by Turkish and Albanian bandits.

== See also ==
- List of settlements in Aetolia-Acarnania
