= Pigadaki =

Pigadaki (Greek: Πηγαδάκι meaning little spring) may refer to several places in Greece:

- Pigadaki, a subdivision of Sparto in the municipality of Amfilochia, Aetolia-Acarnania
- Pigadaki, a subdivision of Sykia in the municipal unit of Toroni, Chalkidiki
