= Triklino =

Triklino Τρίκλινο
- Community
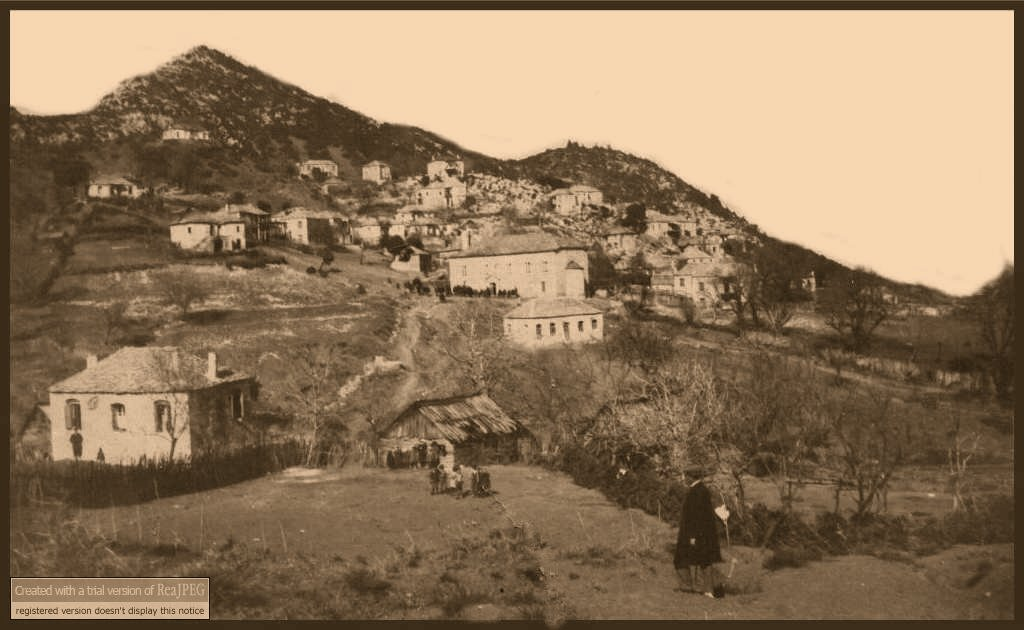

- Location within Greece
- Coordinates: 38°58′N 21°27′E
- Country: Greece
- Administrative region: West Greece
- Regional unit: Aetolia-Acarnania
- Municipality: Amfilochia
- Municipal unit: Inachos

Population (2021)
  - Community: 119
- Time zone: UTC+2 (EET)
  - Summer (DST): UTC+3 (EEST)

Triklino (Greek: Τρίκλινο, before 1927: Πριάντζα - Priantza), is a small mountain village (altitude 600 m.). It is located in the northwest part of Greece and belongs to Aetolia-Acarnania. The artificial lake Kremasta is the boundary of the village with neighbouring Evrytania. The village belongs to the Inachos municipal unit. The nearest major city is Agrinio.

== History ==
The village first appears under the name "Priantza" in the official catalogue of the Greek State in the year 1840.

Originally, the name "Triklino" referred to a settlement at the neighbouring valley of the river Achelous. The valley was cultivated mostly with corn plantations. It was abandoned during the early 60s, when the government compensated the farmers in order to construct a large dam at a place known as "Kremasta". The settlement and the cultivated land were eventually covered with water. A huge artificial lake was formed in the area, and is now known as "Kremasta lake".

The following people from the village are the most known in the region:

1. The fighter for the independence of Greece (1821–1829) Kasvikis Giannakis, who lost his life struggling against the Turks on a small island ( named Dolmas) near Mesolongi during the war for the independence of Greece (28 - 2 - 1826). See source [7]

2.The abbot of the Tatarna monastery Stefanos Papadimitriou. See Source [3]

3. The patriot Dr. Harilaos I.Papaioannou who was one of the first members of the Greek National Resistance Organisation, (EDES - ΕΔΕΣ), in the Valtos province (during the German Occupation 1941-1944) under the leadership of Napoleon Zervas and the second-in-command Stylianos Houtas. His brothers Alexandros Papaioannou, (army officer) and Christoforos, (teacher), were also members of the same organisation. See Sources [4,5,6]

== Population ==
Year	Population
1981	389
1991	229
2001	288
2011	145
2021	119

== Tatarna Bridge ==
In the early 1970s the Tatarna Bridge was constructed. The bridge is located approximately 3 km east of the village and connects Aetolia-Acarnania with Evrytania. The bridge is considered as a very important architectural achievement, and holds 4 world awards related to its method of structure (engineer and architect: Aristarchos Oikonomou - Αρίσταρχος Οικονόμου).

== Other ==
Every 6 August Transfiguration of Christ (Μεταμόρφωση του Σωτήρος Χριστού) is celebrated. A 2-days festival ("panygiri") is taking place at the square of the village. It is an occasion for all the people from Triklino (scattering all over Greece) to meet with friends and relatives.

== See also ==
- List of settlements in Aetolia-Acarnania
