= Aitoliko Lagoon =

Lake in Greece

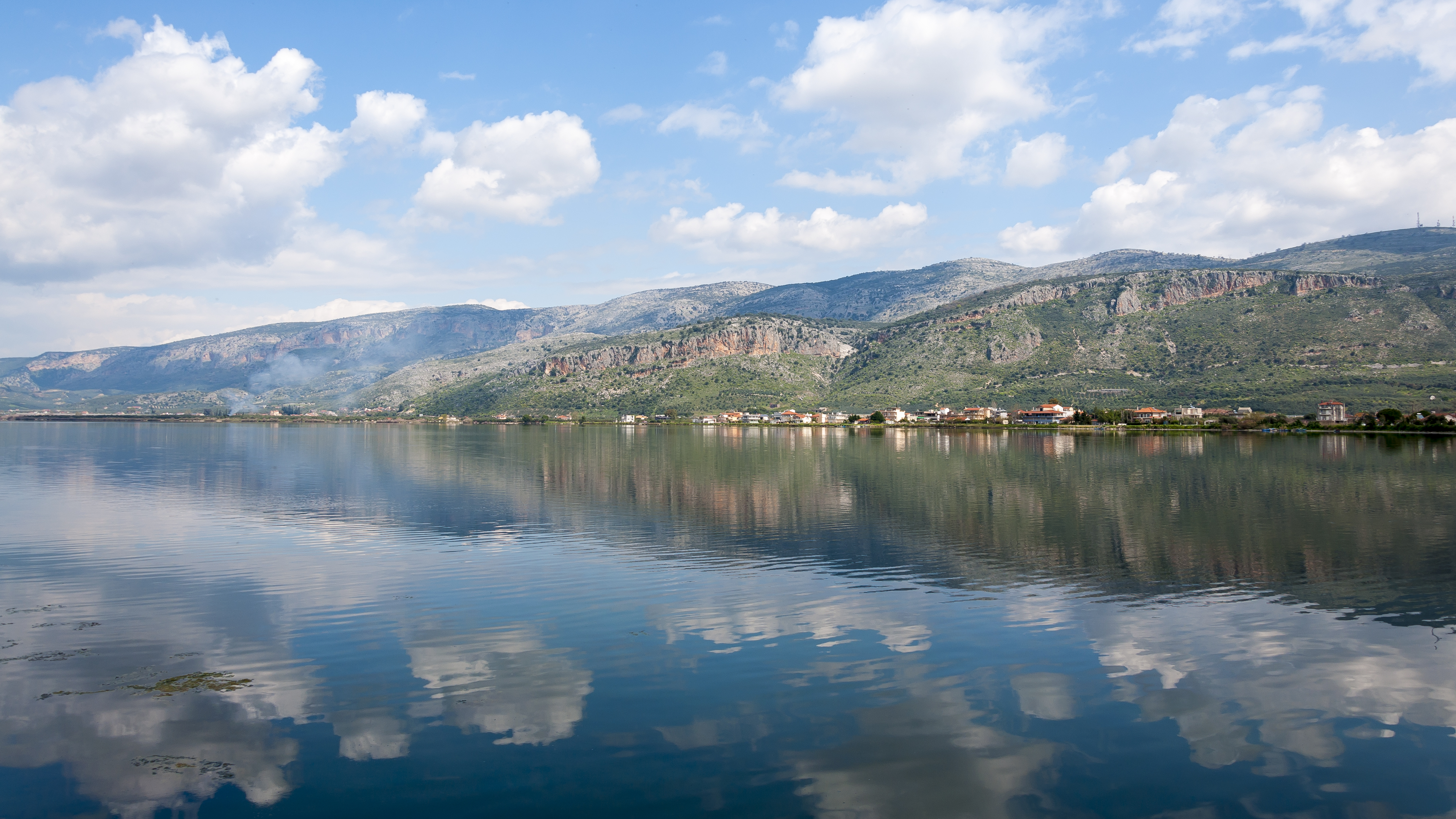

- Location within Greece
- Location: Aetolia-Acarnania
- Coordinates: 38.47°N 21.33°E
- Primary outflows: Missolonghi Lagoon
- Basin countries: Greece
- Max. length: 7.3 km (4.5 mi)
- Max. width: 2.7 km (1.7 mi)
- Surface area: approx. 20 km^{2} (7.7 sq mi)
- Max. depth: 28 m (92 ft)
- Settlements: Aitoliko

The Aitoliko Lagoon (Greek: Λιμνοθάλασσα Αιτωλικού Limnothalassa Aitolikou) is a lagoon located in the south of Aetolia-Acarnania, Greece. It is separated from the larger Missolonghi Lagoon (a bay of the Gulf of Patras) to the south by the island of Aitoliko, but together they form the Missolonghi–Aitoliko Lagoons complex. Its maximum depth is 28 metres. At a salinity of 19-28 PSU, its water is brackish. Oxygen depletion occurs in a large part of the lagoon, but has been reduced since 2002 by creating larger openings around Aitoliko island and dredging channels in Messolongi Lagoon. The main settlement on the lagoon is the town Aitoliko.
