= Agrampela, Aetolia-Acarnania =

Agrampela Αγράμπελα Dajianda
- Settlement
- Location within Greece
- Coordinates: 38°34.7′N 21°10.5′E
- Country: Greece
- Administrative region: West Greece
- Regional unit: Aetolia-Acarnania
- Municipality: Xiromero
- Municipal unit: Astakos
  - Community: 8.726 km^{2} (3.369 sq mi)
- Elevation: 220 m (720 ft)

Population (2021)
  - Community: 58
  - Community density: 6.6/km^{2} (17/sq mi)
- Time zone: UTC+2 (EET)
  - Summer (DST): UTC+3 (EEST)
- Postal code: 300 06
- Area code: +30-2646
- Vehicle registration: AI, ME

Agrampela (Greek: Αγράμπελα; Aromanian: Dajianda) is an Aromanian village and a community of the Xiromero municipality. Since the 2011 local government reform it was part of the municipality Astakos, of which it was a municipal district. The 2021 census recorded 58 residents in the village. The community of Agrampela covers an area of 8.726 km^{2}.

== See also ==
- List of settlements in Aetolia-Acarnania
