= Ozeros =

Lake in Aetolia, Greece

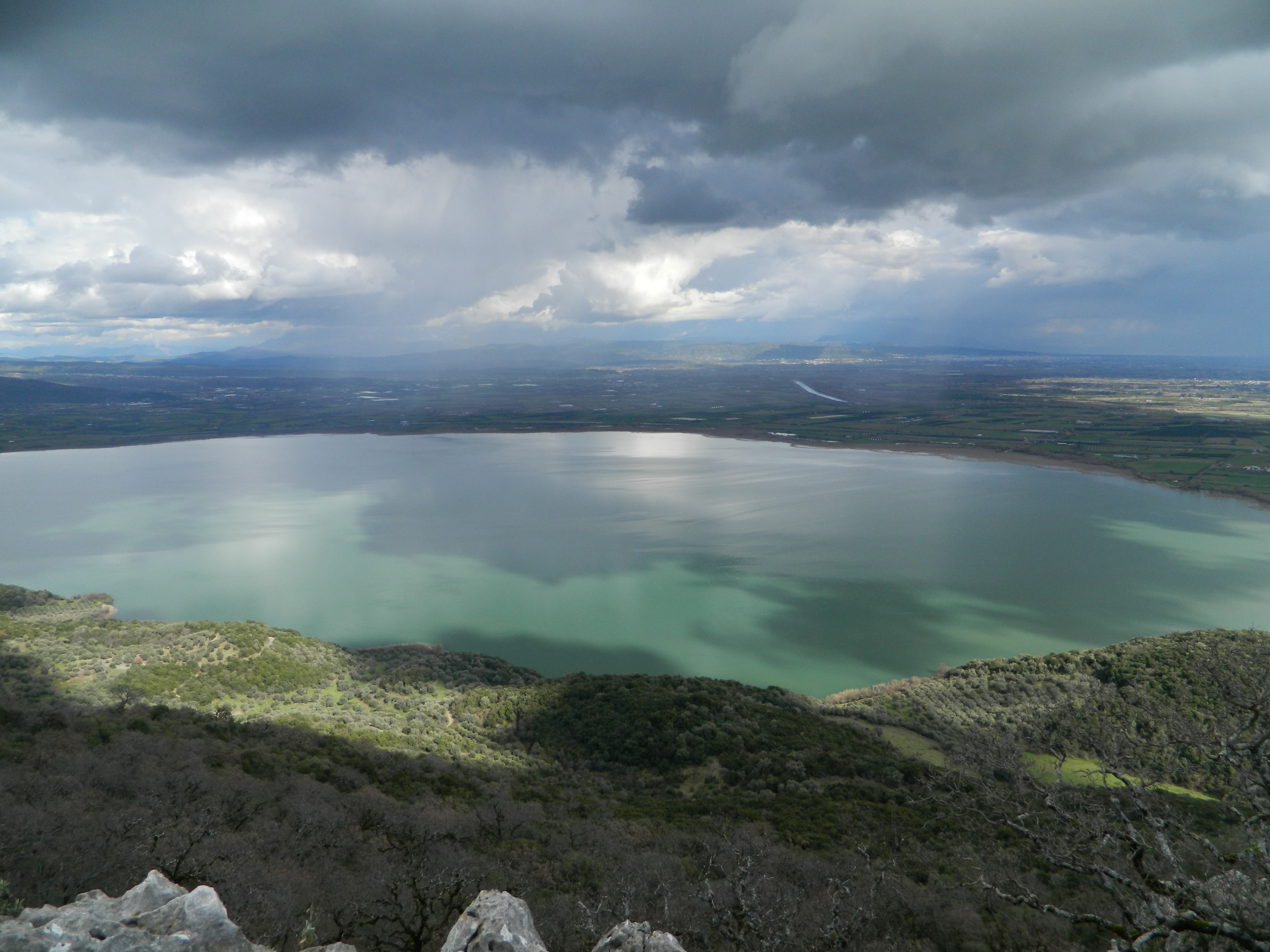
- View of Ozeros lake

- Location within Greece
- Location: Aetolia-Acarnania
- Coordinates: 38°39′21″N 21°13′27″E
- Type: natural
- Basin countries: Greece
- Max. length: 5 km (3.1 mi)
- Max. width: 3 km (1.9 mi)
- Surface area: 10 km^{2} (3.9 sq mi)
- Max. depth: 10 m (33 ft)
- Settlements: Agios Konstantinos

Lake Ozeros (Greek: Οζερός, Λίμνη Οζερού) is a lake located west of the Greek city of Agrinio. The lake has its own catchment area but is sometimes connected to the waters of the Acheloos river, flowing from the northwest, when the river overflows. The lake has a surface of ca. 10 km^{2} and an average depth of 8–10 m, but this varies greatly with the season. The A5 motorway, part of European route E55, runs to the east of the lake.

== Nearest places ==
- Agios Konstantinos, southeast
- Kalyvia, south
- Bampini, west
- Fyteies, northwest
