= Agios Vlasios =

Agios Vlasios (Greek: Άγιος Βλάσιος meaning Saint Blaise) may refer to several places:

== In Cyprus ==
- Agios Vlasios, Cyprus

== In Greece ==
- Agios Vlasios, Inachos, a village in Aetolia-Acarnania, part of the municipality Inachos
- Agios Vlasios, Parakampylia, a village in Aetolia-Acarnania, part of the municipality Parakampylia
- Agios Vlasios, Boeotia, a village in Boeotia
- Agios Vlasios, Euboea, a village in Euboea
- Agios Vlasios, Magnesia, a village in Magnesia
- Agios Vlasios, Thesprotia, a village in Thesprotia
- Agios Vlasios, Glastra, a Settlement in Glastra

=== Related ===
- Ano Agios Vlasios, a village in Aetolia-Acarnania, Greece
- Kato Agios Vlasios, a village in Aetolia-Acarnania
