= Palaiomanina =

Palaiomanina Παλαιομάνινα
- Community
- Location within Greece
- Coordinates: 38°33.1′N 21°14.4′E
- Country: Greece
- Administrative region: West Greece
- Regional unit: Aetolia-Acarnania
- Municipality: Xiromero
- Municipal unit: Astakos

Area
  - Community: 26.82 km^{2} (10.36 sq mi)
- Elevation: 120 m (390 ft)

Population (2021)
  - Community: 633
  - Density: 23.6/km^{2} (61.1/sq mi)
- Time zone: UTC+2 (EET)
  - Summer (DST): UTC+3 (EEST)
- Postal code: 300 01
- Area code: +30-2632
- Vehicle registration: AI, ME

Palaiomanina (Greek: Παλαιομάνινα, Aromanian: Cutsombina) is an Aromanian (Vlach) village and a community of the Xiromero municipality. Since the 2011 local government reform it was part of the municipality Astakos, of which it was a municipal district. The 2021 census recorded 633 residents in the village. The community of Palaiomanina covers an area of 26.82 km^{2}.

== See also ==
- List of settlements in Aetolia-Acarnania
