= Amorgianoi =

Amorgianoi Αμοργιανοί
- Community
- Location within Greece
- Coordinates: 38°52′N 21°21′E
- Country: Greece
- Administrative region: West Greece
- Regional unit: Aetolia-Acarnania
- Municipality: Amfilochia
- Municipal unit: Inachos

Population (2021)
  - Community: 324
- Time zone: UTC+2 (EET)
  - Summer (DST): UTC+3 (EEST)

Amorgianoi (Greek: Αμοργιανοί) is a village in the municipal unit of Inachos in Aetolia-Acarnania, Greece. The altitude of the village is 170 meters. Some ancient ruins are located near the old village.

Litzos Christos and Georgios Mastoras or Salodimos or Amorgianiotis were two known persons from the village who participated in different battles during the struggle for independence of Greece (1821–1830).

== Settlements ==
- Amorgianoi
- Malateika
- Prantiko
- Chamoriki

== Population ==
Year	Village population	Community population
1981	-	664
1991	476	-
2001	439	553
2011	363	426
2021	270	324

== See also ==
- List of settlements in Aetolia-Acarnania
