= Kremasta =

Kremasta (Greek: Κρεμαστά) may refer to:

- Kremasta (lake), an artificial lake in Aetolia-Acarnania and Evrytania, Greece
- Kremasta Sykias, a village in the community of Alevrada, Aetolia-Acarnania, Greece
- Kremasta, Drama, a village in Drama regional unit, Greece
