= Stamna, Greece =

Stamna Σταμνά
- Community
- Location within Greece
- Coordinates: 38°31′N 21°17′E
- Country: Greece
- Administrative region: West Greece
- Regional unit: Aetolia-Acarnania
- Municipality: Missolonghi
- Municipal unit: Aitoliko
- Elevation: 104 m (341 ft)

Population (2021)
  - Community: 808
- Time zone: UTC+2 (EET)
  - Summer (DST): UTC+3 (EEST)
- Postal code: 304 00
- Area code: 26320
- Vehicle registration: ΜΕ

Stamna (Greek: Σταμνά) is a village and a community in the municipal unit of Aitoliko in the southern part of Aetolia-Acarnania, Greece. It is located on a chain of low hills that separate the river Acheloos to the west from the bay of Aitoliko to the southeast. It is 6 km south of Angelokastro, 11 km northwest of Aitoliko, 17 km southwest of Agrinio and 21 km northwest of Missolonghi. The Ionia Odos motorway (Missolonghi - Amfilochia) passes east of the village. The community Stamna consists of the villages Stamna, Stathmos Stamnas (1.5 km east, near the former railway station) and Kefalovrysos (4 km southeast, at the bay). Stamna had a train station on the former railway from Missolonghi to Agrinio.

== Historical population ==
Year	Village population	Community population
1981	-	1,321
1991	991	-
2001	939	1,156
2011	651	909
2021	517	808

== See also ==
- List of settlements in Aetolia-Acarnania
