= Perdikaki =

Perdikaki Περδικάκι
- Community
- Location within Greece
- Coordinates: 39°03′N 21°21′E
- Country: Greece
- Administrative region: West Greece
- Regional unit: Aetolia-Acarnania
- Municipality: Amfilochia
- Municipal unit: Inachos

Population (2021)
  - Community: 310
- Time zone: UTC+2 (EET)
  - Summer (DST): UTC+3 (EEST)

Perdikaki (Greek: Περδικάκι, before 1930: Σακαρέτσι - Sakaretsi) is a village and a community located in the northeastern part of Aetolia-Acarnania. It belongs to the municipal unit of Inachos. The community includes the village Pigadia. The altitude is about 700 meters. The mountain road to Patiopoulo rises to an altitude of 1,160 metres.

For the village's history, see The Sakaretsi by Pavlos Karakostas (Athens 1999)

== Population ==
Year	Population village	Population community
1981	-	602
1991	517	-
2001	418	466
2011	356	403
2021	269	310

== Notable people ==
- Pavlos Karakostas (1937-2002) author

== See also ==
- List of settlements in Aetolia-Acarnania
