= Malesiada =

Malesiada Μαλεσιάδα
- Community
- Location within Greece
- Coordinates: 38°54′N 21°20′E
- Country: Greece
- Administrative region: West Greece
- Regional unit: Aetolia-Acarnania
- Municipality: Amfilochia
- Municipal unit: Inachos

Population (2021)
  - Community: 286
- Time zone: UTC+2 (EET)
  - Summer (DST): UTC+3 (EEST)

Malesiada is a village and a community in Aetolia-Acarnania, Greece. The village belongs to the municipal unit of Inachos. Through the village passes the provincial road which leads from Agrinio and Amfilochia to Empesos and further to Arta and Evrytania (through the Tatarna Bridge over the artificial lake of Kremasta).

The municipal district Malesiada consists of the villages Nea Malesiada, Ano Kampos and Maraneli.

== Nea Malesiada ==
Nea Malesiada is the largest village of the municipal district Malesiada. The old village Malesiada was isolated and the villagers asked from the State to reestablish it at a new place along the provincial road which connects Agrinio with Empesos in order to have better living conditions. After the reestablishment, the village took the name "Nea Malesiada" with "Nea" meaning "New". In the village there is a market that sells meat products.

From Malesiada comes the 'Malesiadas' family, members of which (Georgios, Kostas, Stamoulis) fought during the Greek War of Independence (1821–1827). It was this family which gave its name to the village. The last thirty years the population steadily declines because the young people moved to other parts of the country, especially to Athens and Agrinion or even abroad for finding better work or living conditions.
