= Vaso Katraki =

Greek painter and engraver (1914–1988)

- Βάσω Κατράκη
- Born: Vaso Leonardos; 5 July 1914; Aitoliko, Aetolia-Acarnania, Greece
- Died: 27 December 1988 (aged 74)
- Occupations: Painter, printmaker

Vaso Katraki (Greek: Βάσω Κατράκη, 5 July 1914 – 27 December 1988) was a Greek painter and engraver. She was known for her passionate depictions of the sufferings of the Greek people during and after World War II. In 1967 she was exiled to a barren island by the military junta on the day that it took power. She started with wood engraving, then developed an original and very unusual technique of sandstone engraving.

== Life ==
Vaso Leonardos was born on 5 July 1914 in Aitoliko, Aetolia-Acarnania, daughter of George Leonardos and Theodora Sarlis. She had four siblings. She recalled that her father was a gifted artist and her mother was well known as a weaver. The family home was a house by the sea. In 1936 she was admitted to the Athens School of Fine Arts where she studied painting under Konstantinos Parthenis and engraving under Giannis Kefallinos. She and fellow-students staged a group exhibition with anti-war and anti-fascist material. She graduated in 1940 with a three-month scholarship for painting in the islands. In 1941 she married George Katrakis in Nea Anchialos. During World War II (1939–45) she was involved in the National Liberation Front (EAM) resistance movement opposed to the German occupiers of Greece.

Vaso Katraki and her husband moved to Piraeus in 1946, where they lived for several years with Nikiforos Vrettakos. In 1948 George Katrakis was arrested and exiled to Lemnos for eight months, and then to Makronisos. In 1949 Vaso Katraki was a founding member of the Στάθμη (Level) group, and participated in the first exhibition of this group at the Zappeion. Under the Greek military junta (1967–74) Vaso Katraki was arrested on 21 April 1967, the first day of the coup, and exiled to the barren island of Gioura. She spent nine and a half months on the island, where the exiles suffered from hunger, thirst and beatings. She was released in 1968 after international pressure. She held her last solo exhibition in Athens in 1987. She died on 27 December 1988.

== Work ==
Vaso Katraki was perhaps the leading Greek engraver in the second half of the 20th century. At first she engraved in wood during the German occupation, later producing book illustrations and engravings of the fishermen and landscape of Messolonghi. In 1955 she began engraving in sandstone using an original technique that earned international recognition. In the first fifteen years of her career her works were dominated by figures. Her socially and politically charged paintings and engravings document the intense difficulties of the Greek people in the postwar period. Her images showed the protests, persecution, the persecuted, hungry children, sacrifices and death.

== Exhibitions ==
Vaso Katraki held her first solo exhibition in 1955 at the Zechariah gallery. In 1958 she won the first prize in engraving at the Mediterranean Biennale in Alexandria, and also won a prize at the International Biennial of Engraving in Lugano. She also participated in international exhibitions in São Paulo, Tokyo and Leipzig, earning significant recognition. Her work was featured in the 1996 33rd Venice Biennale, where it earned the "Tamarind" international lithography award.

== Museum ==
After her death George Katrakis, who died in 1994, managed to ensure the creation of Vaso Katraki museum in Aetoliko. The museum was inaugurated in June 2006 with a permanent exhibition works of Vaso Katraki. The Municipal Art Gallery of Ioannina holds a sample of her work.

== Sources ==
- "Βιογραφικά Στοιχεία", Vasso Katraki Museum (in Greek), archived from the original on 2015-01-04
- Δημοτική Πινακοθήκη (in Greek), Municipality of Ioannina
- "Έκθεση έργων της χαράκτριας Βάσως Κατράκη (ΦΩΤΟ)", 902.gr (in Greek), 19 February 2014
- Γουλάκη-Βουτυρά Αλεξάνδρα (12 September 2013), "Βάσω Κατράκη: σε Λευκό και Μαύρο, έκθεση στο Τελλόγλειο Ίδρυμα", Culturenow.gr (in Greek)
- Μαρία Μποϊλέ (8 March 2011), "Βάσω Κατράκη", art.mag (in Greek)
- "Vaso Katraki", Museum of Cycladic Art
