= Gouriotissa =

Gouriotissa Γουριώτισσα Catsaru
- Community
- Location within Greece
- Coordinates: 38°36.9′N 21°13.3′E
- Country: Greece
- Administrative region: West Greece
- Regional unit: Aetolia-Acarnania
- Municipality: Agrinio
- Municipal unit: Stratos

Area
  - Community: 15.774 km^{2} (6.090 sq mi)
- Elevation: 100 m (330 ft)

Population (2021)
  - Community: 297
  - Density: 18.8/km^{2} (48.8/sq mi)
- Time zone: UTC+2 (EET)
  - Summer (DST): UTC+3 (EEST)
- Postal code: 301 00
- Area code: +30-2632
- Vehicle registration: AI

Gouriotissa (Greek: Γουριώτισσα; Aromanian: Catsaru) is an Aromanian (Vlach) village and a community of the Agrinio municipality. Since the 2011 local government reform it was part of the municipality Stratos, of which it was a municipal district. The 2021 census recorded 297 residents in the village. The community of Gouriotissa covers an area of 15.774 km^{2}.

== See also ==
- List of settlements in Aetolia-Acarnania
