= Inachos, Greece =

Inachos Ίναχος
- Municipal unit
- Location within the regional unit

- Location within Greece
- Coordinates: 38°58′N 21°21′E
- Country: Greece
- Administrative region: West Greece
- Regional unit: Aetolia-Acarnania
- Municipality: Amfilochia

Area
  - Municipal unit: 585.382 km^{2} (226.017 sq mi)

Population (2021)
  - Municipal unit: 3,967
  - Municipal unit density: 6.777/km^{2} (17.55/sq mi)
- Time zone: UTC+2 (EET)
  - Summer (DST): UTC+3 (EEST)
- Postal code: 300 17
- Area code: 26470

Inachos (Greek: Ίναχος) is a former municipality in Aetolia-Acarnania, West Greece, Greece. Since the 2011 local government reform it is part of the municipality Amfilochia, of which it is a municipal unit. It is located in the northernmost part of Aetolia-Acarnania. Its land area is 585.382 km^{2}. Its population was 3,967 at the 2021 census. Its municipal seat was the town of Neo Chalkiopoulo.

== Subdivisions ==
The municipal unit Inachos is subdivided into the following communities (constituent villages in brackets):

- Chalkiopoulo (Neo Chalkiopoulo, Agioi Theodoroi, Agios Vlasios, Agios Minas, Agrapidokampos, Xomeri, Prosilia, Chalkiopouloi)
- Agridi (Neo Agridi, Dromitsa, Kaminos)
- Alevrada (Alevrada, Kremasta Sykias, Pistiana)
- Amorgianoi (Amorgianoi, Malateika, Prantiko, Chamoriki)
- Vrouviana (Vrouviana, Avlaki)
- Giannopouloi (Paliampela, Giannopouloi)
- Empesos (Empesos, Grammatsouli, Skatzokampos, Sykea, Ftelia)
- Malesiada (Nea Malesiada, Ano Kampos, Maraneli)
- Bampali
- Patiopoulo (Patiopoulo, Thyamos, Petsalia, Fragkou)
- Perdikaki (Perdikaki, Pigadia)
- Petrona (Petrona, Varko Kyprio, Ypapanti)
- Podogora
- Stathas (Stathas, Pavliada, Potamia)
- Triklino (Triklino, Ampeli)
