= Missolonghi–Aitoliko Lagoons =

Complex of lagoons in Western Greece

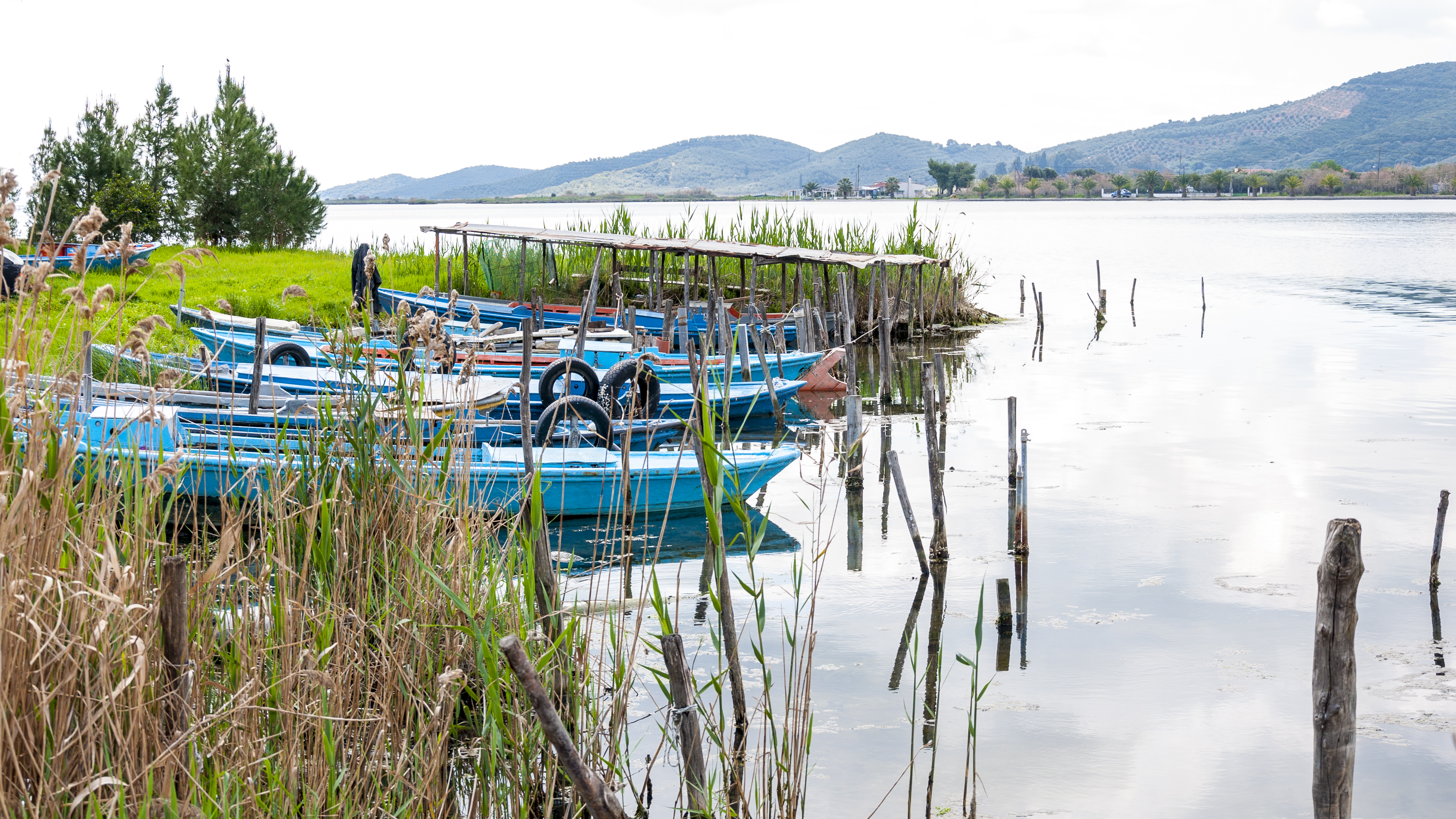
- Missolonghi-Aitoliko lagoons

- Location within Greece
- Location: Aetolia-Acarnania
- Coordinates: 38.387°N 21.358°E
- Primary inflows: Acheloos
- Basin countries: Greece
- Surface area: ca. 150 km^{2} (58 sq mi)
- Settlements: Missolonghi, Aitoliko

Ramsar Wetland
- Official name: Messolonghi lagoons
- Designated: 21 August 1975
- Reference no.: 62

The Missolonghi-Aitoliko lagoons complex is located in the north part of the Gulf of Patras in the central west coast of Greece. It is one of the most important Mediterranean lagoons. It is a shallow area of 150 km^{2}, extended between the Acheloos and Evinos rivers. It is protected by the Ramsar Convention and it is also included in the Natura 2000 network.

The largest portion is the Kentriki Limnothalassa ("central lagoon") a shallow sea separated from the Gulf of Patras and the Ionian Sea by a chain of sand islands and is characterized as open type lagoon. To the north, the Aitoliko lagoon is connected to the central lagoon by a narrow “neck” and resembles a deep lake (depth 28 m) rather than a lagoon. The Anatoliki Klisova, Dytiki Klisova, as well as the western lagoons of the complex, namely Tholi and Palaiopotamos, are some shallow areas characterized as closed type lagoons. These communicate with the sea along channels and receives fresh water from the drainage pump system of the region. These lagoons resembles the typical lagoons of north Italy where ‘’vallicultura’’ (lagoon aquaculture) is practiced. The bottom of the western and northwestern area of this system is muddy in contrast to the southern and south-eastern part, which is formed by sand and mud and is almost totally covered by Cymodocea nodosa. The six distinct lagoons can be defined by their topographic and hydrological characteristics.

== Abiotic features ==
The hydrological balance is mostly controlled by meteorological conditions since, due to the absence of significant tides the main factors controlling the water circulation in the lagoons are the wind intensity and direction. On the other hand, because of the limited depth of the lagoons the meteorological changes rapidly affect the abiotic parameters of the water masses.

The seasonal changes of the air temperature and rainfall affecting the dynamics the abiotic and biotic parameters of the lagoons. The mean monthly air temperature ranged from 5 to 30 °C with seasonal fluctuations typical of the Mediterranean climate. Two periods of important rainfall were observed, one in spring and another one from October to December. The area is a very important fishing ground for the local community.

== Fishing exploitation of the lagoons ==
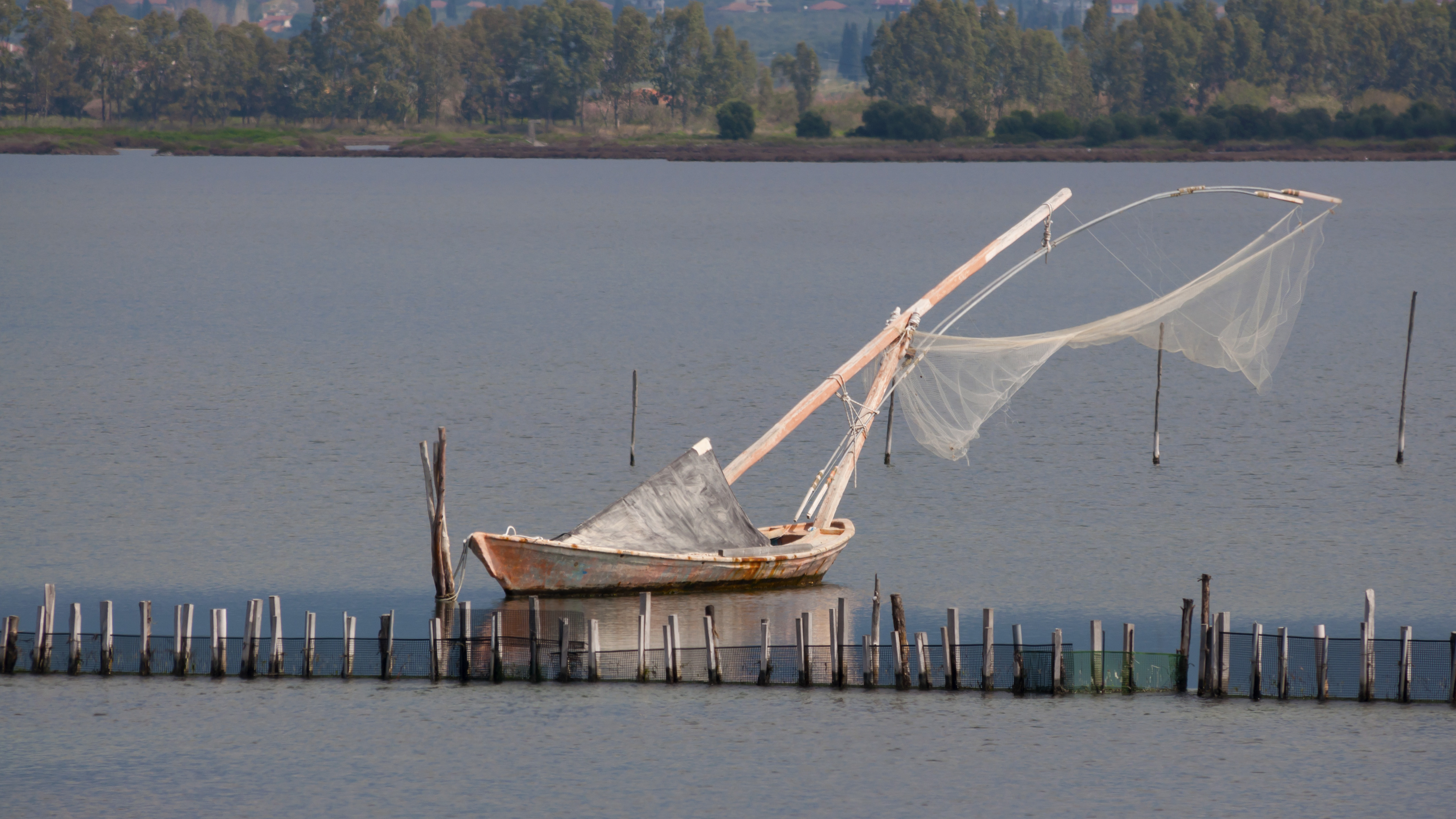
A boat in Missolonghi-Aitoliko Lagoons

The Missolonghi–Aitoliko lagoon system is a property of the Greek State. The exploitation is a common extensive culture based on the seasonal entrance of young fish (mainly fry, as well as 1 and 2 years old specimens) in the lagoons and the autumn to winter offshore fish migration. Eight fishing co-operative enterprises leasing the lagoons and exploiting the two types of the barrier traps installed at the interface between the lagoon and the sea supply the main fish catches.

These are passive gears and their position as well as their nature and the effective fishing period, remained unchanged during the last centuries. The so-called independent fishermen who fish mainly with lights, spears and longlines use the non-leased area of the lagoon system. Furthermore, gill nets and dip nets are also used in the lagoon all over the year.

The total annual fish catches decreased from 1500 – 2000 tn in 1960's to 1300 – 1500 tn in recent years and is provided by 200 fishermen working at the barrier traps and 700 (independent fishermen) fishing in the lagoon.

The total annual fisheries landings of the barrier fish traps are estimated in 195 tn and they are mainly composed by 16 species belonging to 8 families. Eel (Anguilla anguilla), four species of Mugilidae (Liza saliens, Liza aurata, Liza ramada and Mugil cephalus), two species of Sparidae (Sparus aurata and Diplodus annularis) and one species of Mullidae (Mullus barbatus) represent more than 92% of the total annual landings. The composition of the fisheries landings varies between lagoons. A group comprised lagoons the landings of which were dominated by eel, the second group was dominated by Mugilidae species and S. aurata, and the third one by L. ramada and M. cephalus.

The diversity index of the fisheries landings was rather constant in time except for the Etoliko lagoon where repeated anoxic crises decreased the diversity index value to almost zero. All landings series showed a dominant annual cycle. Two seasonal patterns of the fisheries landings were observed, linked to the fish spawning behavior and/or their reaction to environmental forcings. In a smaller temporal scale (week to month), the migrations are controlled by the meteorological conditions and the lunar cycles. The increase of S. aurata landings in Mesolonghi-Aitoliko lagoons complex during the last years can be linked to the rapid development of the fish farms in the around coastal area.

A traditional product which is connected with the fishing exploitation of the lagoons is avgotaracho Messolongiou. The mature ovaries of the flathead grey mullet (Mugil cephalus) manufactured in the traditional way: the whole ovaries of flathead mullet are washed with water, salted with natural sea salt, dried under the sun, and then covered with melted natural wax. This is very famous product with a great commercial value (about 140 €/kg). Also, this is one of the five products in the category of fresh fish, molluscs, crustaceans and products with protected designation of origin and geographical indication by laws of the Greek Government and the European Union. The term of protected designation of origin is used to describe foodstuffs, which are produced, processed and prepared in a defined geographical area using recognised specific methods.

== Islands in Missolonghi-Aitoliko lagoons ==
- Aitoliko
- Dolmas
- Kleisova
- Komma
- Prokopanistos
- Schinias
- Tourlida
- Vasiladi

== Gallery ==
Modern Barrier fishing traps

Traditional Barrier fishing traps

Fish caught in the lagoon

Avgotaracho
