= Missolonghi Lagoon =

Lagoon in Western Greece

- Location within Greece
- Location: Aetolia-Acarnania
- Coordinates: 38.3500°N 21.3667°E
- Type: natural
- Basin countries: Greece
- Max. length: 15 to 20 km (9.3 to 12.4 mi)
- Max. width: 15 km (9.3 mi)
- Surface area: about 20 to 50 km^{2} (7.7 to 19.3 sq mi)
- Max. depth: 9 m (30 ft)
- Settlements: Missolonghi

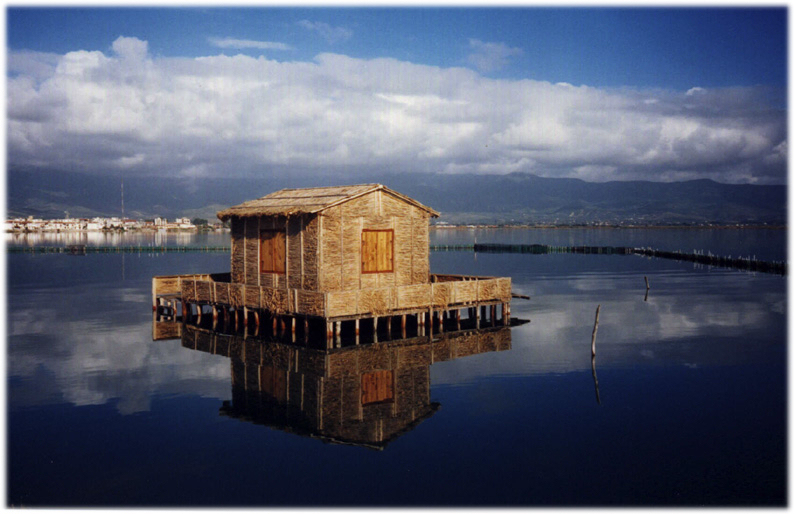
Traditional stilt house in the lagoon of Missolonghi, Western Greece.

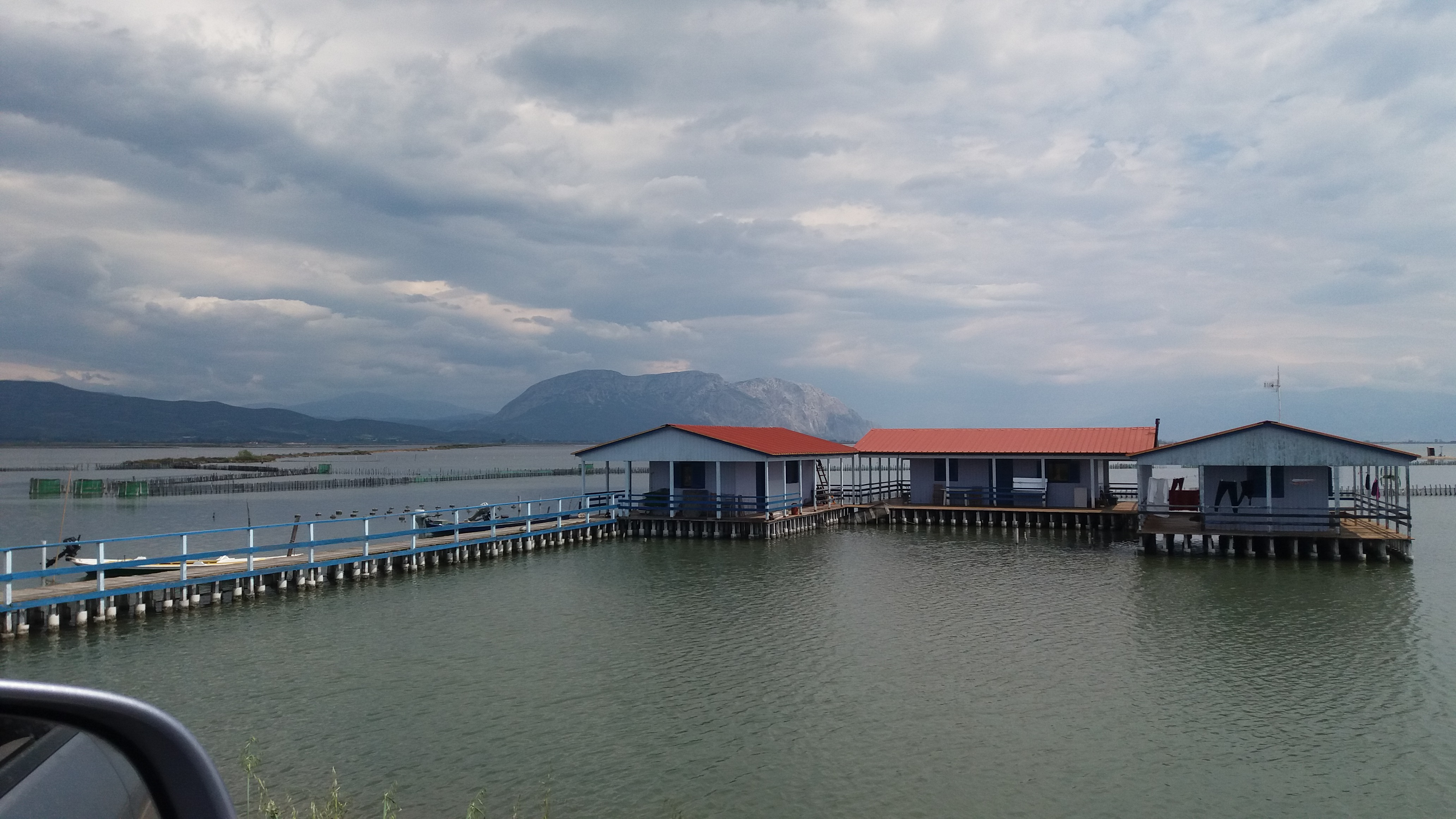
"Pelades" in Tourlida village, Mesologi Lagoon.

The Missolonghi Lagoon (Greek: Λιμνοθάλασσα Μεσολογγίου, Limnothalassa Mesolongiou) is a shallow lagoon located in the south of Aetolia-Acarnania, Western Greece. It is connected with the Gulf of Patras, a bay of the Ionian Sea. It has a triangular shape and its width varies between approximately 15 to 20 km.

Its maximum depth is 5 to 6 metres although mainly it is less than half a metre deep. Several islands surround the lagoon. Near the coast, the depth is only 10 cm and it is a swampy area. Fish and seaweed live in the lagoon. Strabo called the lake Kynia.

Aitoliko Lagoon is located to the north of the lagoon. Together they form the Missolonghi–Aitoliko Lagoons complex.

The lagoon was partly drained in the 20th century especially in the western portion in which a part of the land extended southward with farmlands and dikes. The island of Aitoliko or sometimes the peninsula extended by 15 km and 200 m making it the longest extension, the eastern half became a canal and it resembles a dike.

== Islands in Missolonghi lagoon ==
- Dolmas
- Kleisova
- Komma
- Prokopanistos
- Schinias
- Tourlida
- Vasiladi
