= Ochthia, Aetolia-Acarnania =

Ochthia Όχθια
- Community
- Location within Greece
- Coordinates: 38°39.5′N 21°17.1′E
- Country: Greece
- Administrative region: West Greece
- Regional unit: Aetolia-Acarnania
- Municipality: Agrinio
- Municipal unit: Stratos

Area
  - Community: 12.4 km^{2} (4.8 sq mi)
- Elevation: 40 m (130 ft)

Population (2021)
  - Community: 384
  - Density: 31.0/km^{2} (80.2/sq mi)
- Time zone: UTC+2 (EET)
  - Summer (DST): UTC+3 (EEST)
- Postal code: 301 00
- Area code: +30-2641
- Vehicle registration: AI

Ochthia (Greek: Όχθια, Aromanian: Ochtu) is an Aromanian village and a community of the Agrinio municipality. Before the 2011 local government reform it was part of the municipality Stratos, of which it was a municipal district. The 2021 census recorded 384 residents in the village. The community of Ochthia covers an area of 12.4 km^{2}.

== See also ==
- List of settlements in Aetolia-Acarnania
