= Varetada =

Varetada Βαρετάδα
- Community
- Location within Greece
- Coordinates: 38°52′N 21°17′E
- Country: Greece
- Administrative region: West Greece
- Regional unit: Aetolia-Acarnania
- Municipality: Amfilochia
- Municipal unit: Amfilochia
- Elevation: 480 m (1,570 ft)

Population (2021)
  - Community: 212
- Time zone: UTC+2 (EET)
  - Summer (DST): UTC+3 (EEST)
- Postal code: 305 00
- Area code: 26430

Varetada (Greek: Βαρετάδα) is a small village in the municipality of Amfilochia, Aetolia-Acarnania, western Greece. Situated in the southern part of the Makrynoros mountains, its altitude is 480 meters above the sea level. Varetada is 10 km east of Amfilochia. In the village there is the church of Saint Demetrius and an old monastery.

== Population ==
Year	Population
1981	623
1991	314
2001	294
2011	342
2021	212

== Bibliography ==
1. Domi Encyclopedia - Vol III - pg. 248 - Tegopoulou-Maniatea - Athens, 1996
2. Stamatelatos M.& Vamva F. - Geographical Dictionary of Greece (Γεωγραφικό λεξικό της Ελλάδας) - Volume I, pg. 99 - To Vima - newspaper edition - Athens, 2006

== See also ==
- List of settlements in Aetolia-Acarnania
