= Battle of Amfilochia =

WW II resistance action

- Part of the Greek Resistance
Date	12–13 July 1944
Location	Amfilochia, Greece
Result	Resistance victory

Belligerents
(Greece) Greek People's Liberation Army	Wehrmacht (Italian Social Republic) Italian volunteers (Greece) Greek collaborators

The Battle of Amfilochia (Greek: Μάχη της Αμφιλοχίας) began on the evening of July 12, 1944 and lasted until the afternoon of the following day, involving guerrilla forces of the Greek People's Liberation Army (ELAS) against occupation forces of the 104th Jäger Division (made up by German soldiers and Italian volunteers) and local Gendarmerie and Security Battalions forces. It resulted in a victory for ELAS and was one of the largest tactical operations of ELAS throughout the Axis occupation of Greece, both in terms of forces involved and result.

== The battle ==
About 300-350 guerilla fighters of ELAS, with about 1000-1500 supporting reserves positioned on the connecting roads to Arta, Agrinio and Vonitsa (other sources raise the total count of ELAS forces to 2500-3000 fighters) started the operation at 20:00 at night capturing the German outposts on the city limits and at midnight the attack for the capture of the city began. The fighting lasted until the afternoon next day, and took place mainly around the buildings which the Germans had commandeered, since they had been taken by surprise and had not had time to disperse. At dawn, the attackers set fire to the Gendarmerie building with its contents after receiving shots from it, even though the Gendarmerie had agreed with ELAS not to participate in the battle. The tide began to tilt in favor of ELAS in the morning, when the reserves started to get involved in the battle. The ELAS forces withdrew without having completely cleared all the positions of the Nazis, because at 18:00 German reinforcements (three ships from the sea and tanks from Agrinio) began to pour in.

== Aftermath ==
This victory for the Greek resistance resulted in protecting the second major resistance organization EDES and preventing the planned attacks against it from taking place. As a response, the Germans planned the large liquidation operation Echidna (August 5 to 31) against the base of the ELAS rebels in the mountain massif of Roumeli, which, although it failed in its main objective, was responsible for the killing of approximately 170 civilians and the partial or complete destruction of dozens of villages and towns.
