= Léon d'Ymbault =

Léon d'Ymbault de Vanthay (also: Leon d'Ymbault, Leon d'Imbault, Leon von Imbolt, Leon Imbo; c. 1700 in Dragomesti, now Astakos – March/April 1781 in Czernowitz, now Chernivtsi) was the last Moldavian mayor of Czernowitz before the annexation of the Bukovina by Austria in 1775.

== Origin ==
Léon d'Ymbault was an offspring of low French nobility, from the family of Maltese knights Ymbault de Manthay. Nothing is known about his parents. Ymbault was born in the then Venetian city of Dragomesti (at present Astakos (Aστακός) in the Greek prefecture Aetolia-Acarnania), around the year 1700. The exact date of birth is unknown.

== Career ==
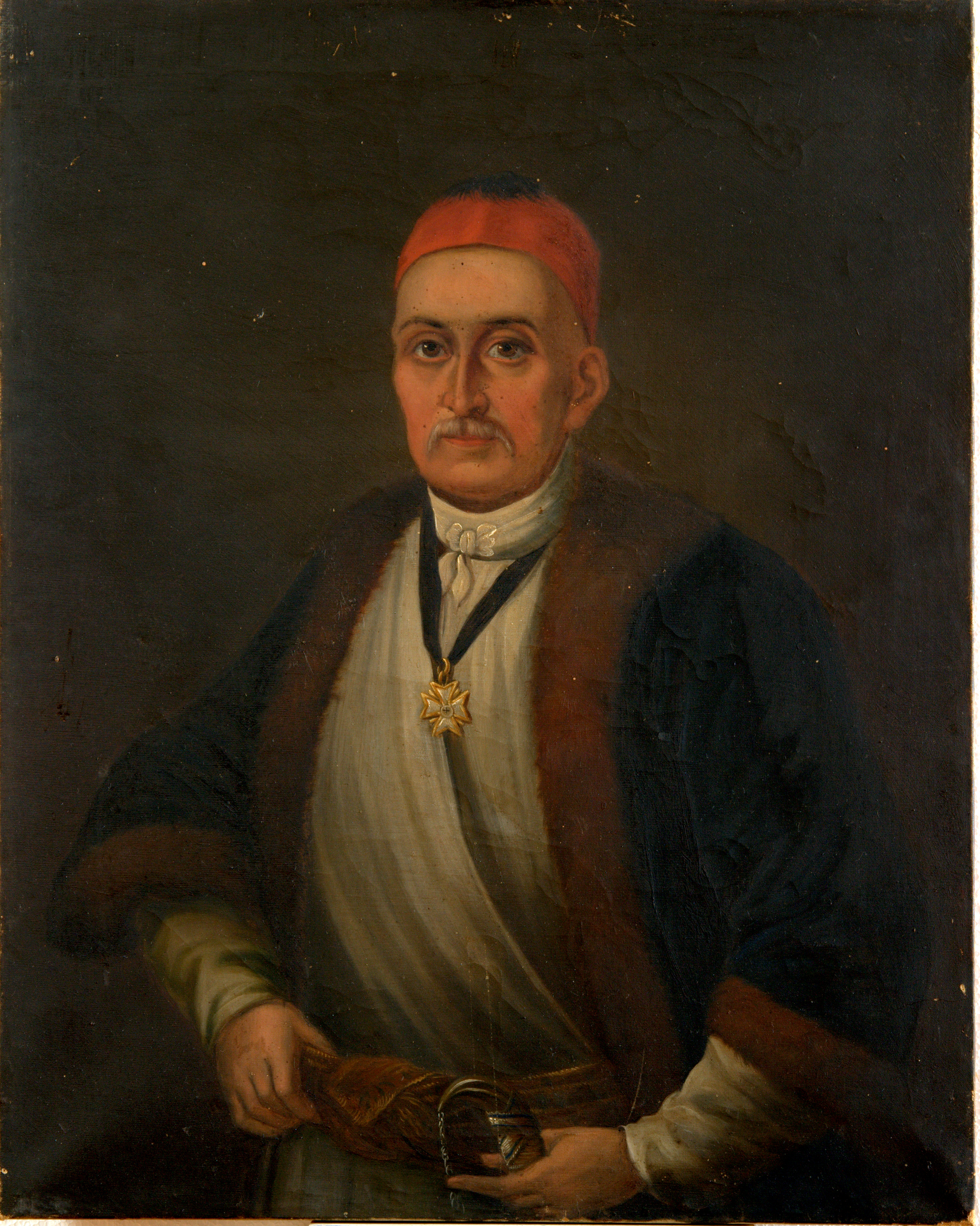
Leon d'Ymbault

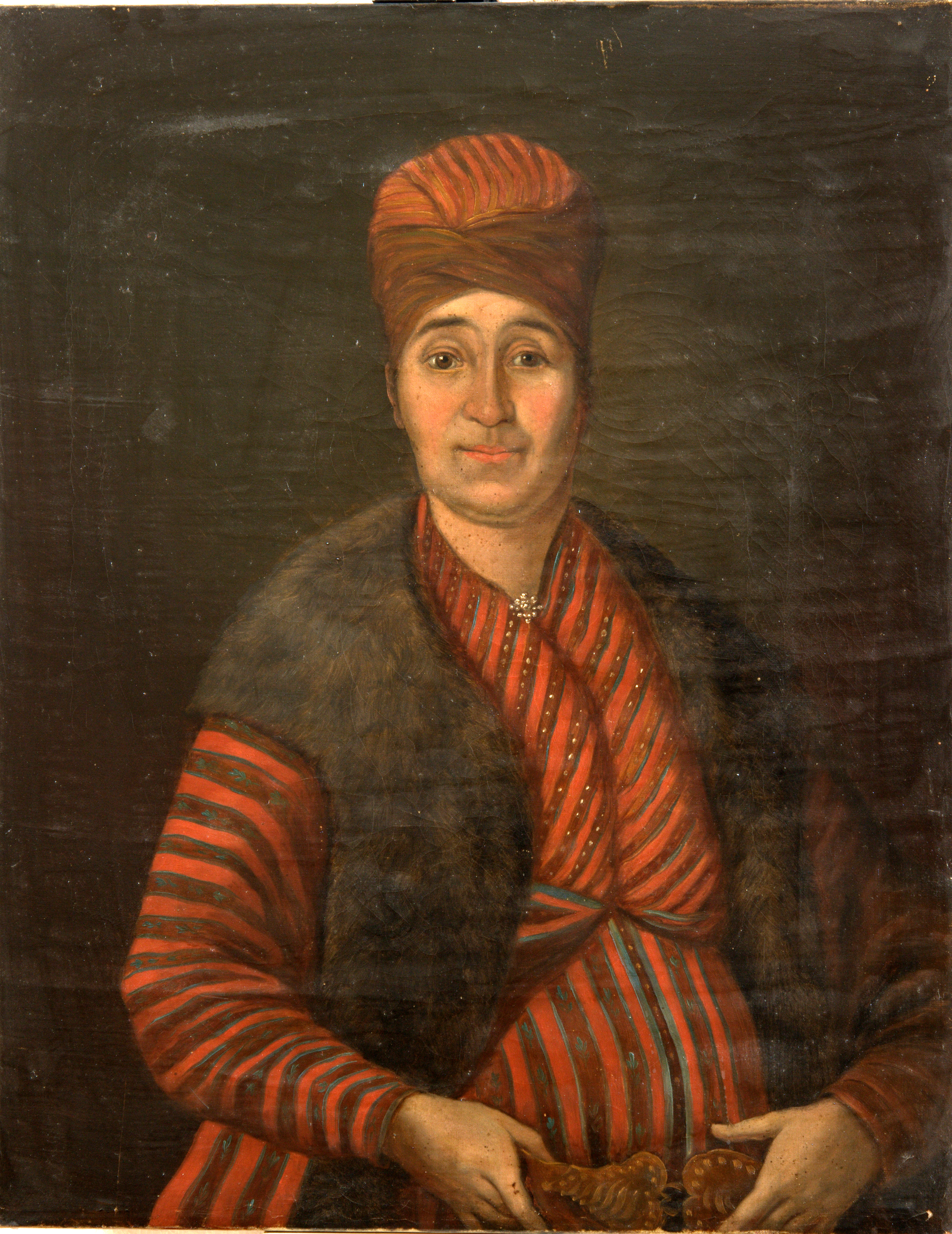
Anna Adreanna Vuczin

Ymbault got his education in the years 1721–1726 in the Capucine Monastery of Pera (the European quarter of Constantinople). In 1730 he became a position as Dragoman (interpreter) at the French legation of Constantinople. In 1734 he was sent as interpreter to Candia (Crete) and in 1735 to Morea (Peloponnese). His good knowledge of Slavonic languages urged his further career. In 1739 the Principality of Moldavia was temporarily occupied by Russian troops. Since 1740 Ymbault worked as dragoman for the Princes of Moldavia and travelled several times in charge of diplomatic tasks to Slavonic neighbour countries (Poland, Russia). According to passes still existing in the family records he was in 1740/41 in Kiev, in 1749 in Cracow and in 1769 in Saint Petersburg. His last travel was made in 1775.

Ymbault was in May 1757 appointed Captain of the important frontier fortress of Soroca (now Moldova) and acquired the title of Mare Paharnic (Great Cup-Bearer). In 1768 he was appointed Starosta of Czernowitz, where he built a house near the Parascheva Church (Czernowitz cadastral no. 352), that is still existing, though strongly changed by later renovations in the 19th century as the Palace Hurmuzachi-Logothetti.

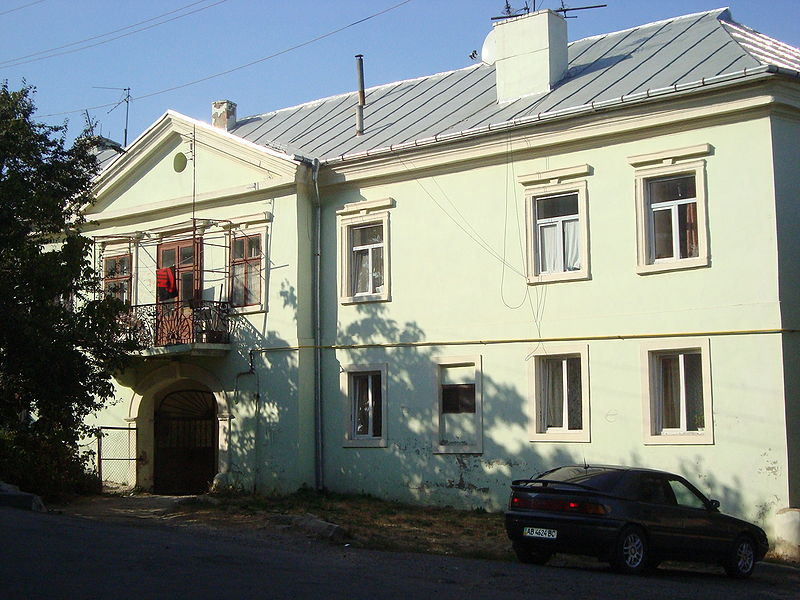
Palace Hurmuzachi-Logothetti, Zankovetskaya Street corner with Main Street in Chernivtsi

During the Russian occupation of Czernowitz (1771–1773) he was replaced by Ilie Herescul. In 1773 he was reimposed in his position of Starosta. According to some sources he should have been deposed as Starosta in the summer of 1773 because of secret contacts with Vincenz von Barco, General of the occupying Austrian army. If this is correct, is not certain as no new Starosta had been installed in his place. Ymbault had to retreat anyway as Starosta after the final decision in 1775 that the Bukovina should be ceded by the Ottoman Empire to Austria. Nevertheless, Ymbault travelled in 1775 once more to Saint Petersburg, presumably to seek help for his former sovereign Grigore III Ghica at the Russian court. After the execution of Ghica on 11 October 1777 Ymbault retired to his manors. It seems that Ymbault was not among the noblemen who held on 12 October 1777 the new sovereign of the Bukovina, Empress Maria Theresa of Austria. He stayed, however, loyal towards the new sovereign during the rest of his life, e.g. by paying border troopers.

On 19 February 1781 Ymbault made his last will in which he bequeathed his possessions in Ober-Scheroutz (now Горішні Шерівці/Horishni Sherivtsi) and Waschkoutz (jetzt Вашківці/Vashkivtsi) to his daughter and her children. When the last will was registered on 30 May 1781 his wife was already a widow. Thus Ymbault must have died in March or April 1781.

== Family ==
Ymbault married in 1758, presumably in Bucharest with Anna Adreanna Voutsina (Vuczin, Wutschin, 1719–1809) from a Greek family of Phanariotes. They had only one child, a daughter Ekatarina d'Ymbault, born 27 November 1759 in Bucharest. She married with the Greek noble from Zakynthos James Count Logothetti (1741–1802). Ekatarina died 23 November 1785. From this marriage all American, Austrian, Hungarian, Moravian and Romanian members of the count's family Logothetti are descendants.

== Literature ==
- Familienarchiv Logothetti 1734-1945, now: Moravský zemský archiv, Brno (Czech Republic), fond G 195.
- Wilken Engelbrecht: Rod Logothettiů. In: Genealogické a heraldické informace 3, 1998, ISSN 0862-8963, p. 17–27.
- Alina Felea: Câteva date despre familia Imbault. In: Tyragetia N. S. 2 = 17, 2008, ISSN 1857-0240, p. 137–140, online (PDF; 214 KB).
- Raimund Friedrich Kaindl, Geschichte von Czernowitz von den ältesten Zeiten bis zur Gegenwart. Czernowitz: Pardini Verlag 1908 (Reprint Tscherniwzi, Verlag Selena Bukowyna 2008).
- Daniel Werenka: Bukowinas Entstehen und Aufblühen: Maria Theresias Zeit I. In: Archiv für österreichische Geschichte 78, 1892, p. 99-296.
