= Vlasios Tsirogiannis =

Greek soldier

- Βλάσιος Τσιρογιάννης
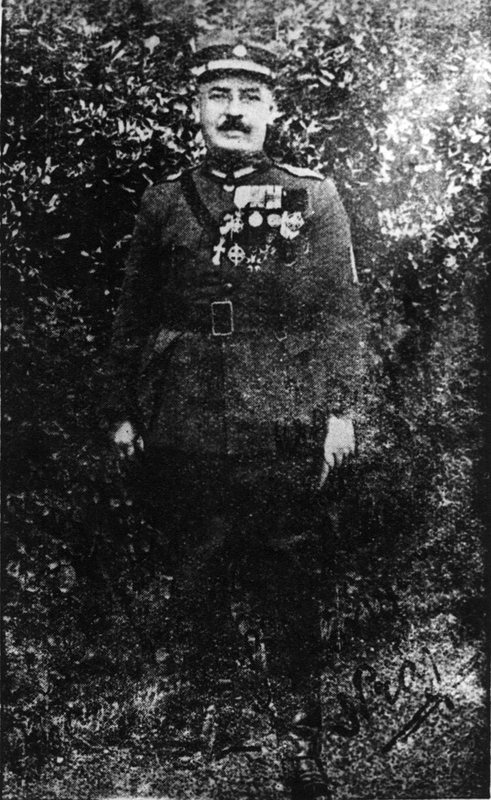
- Vlasios Tsirogiannis c. 1920s.
- Born: 1 January 1872; Karvasaras, Kingdom of Greece
- Died: 5 November 1928; Thessaloniki, Second Hellenic Republic
- Military career
- Allegiance: Kingdom of Greece; Second Hellenic Republic
- Branch: Hellenic Army
- Service years: 1889–1928
- Rank: Lieutenant General
- Nicknames: Dalis; Ντάλης
- Commands: 10th Infantry Regiment (Battalion Commander); 5th Infantry Regiment; 9th Infantry Division (Chief of Infantry); 3rd Infantry Division; 2nd Infantry Division; III Army Corps
- Wars: Greco-Turkish War (1897); Macedonian Struggle; Balkan Wars; First Balkan War; Second Balkan War; World War I; Macedonian front; Greco-Turkish War (1919-1922); Battle of Kütahya–Eskişehir; Battle of the Sakarya
- Awards: Order of the Redeemer; Gold Cross of Valour; War Cross; Medal of Military Merit; Legion of Honour
- Other work: Member of the HMC

Vlasios Tsirogiannis (Greek: Βλάσιος Τσιρογιάννης, 1872–1928) was a Hellenic Army officer who rose to the rank of Lieutenant General.

== Life ==
Vlasios Tsirogiannis was born on 1 January 1872 in Karvasaras (modern Amfilochia). He enlisted in the Hellenic Army as a volunteer on 1 September 1889, and became an NCO. While a student at the NCO School, he participated in the Greco-Turkish War of 1897. On 9 August 1899 he graduated from the NCO School as an Infantry 2nd Lieutenant. In 1904, during the early stages of the Macedonian Struggle, he went to Strumica as the headmaster of a Greek school, with the cover name of Dalis (Ντάλης).

During the Balkan Wars of 1912–13 he served as company and battalion commander in the 10th Infantry Regiment. In 1917–18 he served as commander of the 5th Infantry Regiment at the Serres sector of the Macedonian front. In 1919 he commanded a brigade that recaptured the region of Delvinaki, and later assumed command of a brigade that was intended for the aborted capture of Korytsa. He then went to Asia Minor, where he commanded a detachment of the 9th Infantry Division in the capture of Kütahya (July 1921), and then served as the division's Chief of Infantry in the Battle of the Sakarya (August–September 1921). He was then placed in suspended service, before being recalled after the 11 September 1922 Revolution and placed as commander of the 3rd Infantry Division in the Army of the Evros.

He then served as commanding officer of the 2nd Infantry Division at Athens, before assuming command of an army corps.

Tsirogiannis died on 5 November 1928 as a Lt. General and commander of III Army Corps at Thessaloniki.
