= Nikos Karakostas =

Greek footballer

Personal information
- Full name: Nikolaos Karakostas
- Date of birth: 22 September 1976 (age 50)
- Place of birth: Karditsa, Greece
- Height: 1.88 m (6 ft 2 in)
- Position: Goalkeeper

Senior career*
Years	Team	Apps	(Gls)
1995–1998	Levadiakos	36	(0)
1998–1999	Orestis Orestiada		
1999–2010	Levadiakos	99	(0)
2010–2011	Anagennisi Karditsa		
- * Club domestic league appearances and goals as of 1 July 2011

Nikos Karakostas (Greek: Νίκος Καρακώστας; born 22 September 1976) was a Greek football player who played as a goalkeeper.

== Career ==
Born in Karditsa, Karakostas began playing football for Levadiakos in 1995, and would spend most of his career with the club. The club's veteran goalkeeper, Karakostas only appeared in a few matches during the 2009–10 Super League Greece season due to injury.
