= Tourlida =

Island in the Missolonghi Lagoon, Greece

Native name: Τουρλίδα
- Location within Greece

Geography
- Coordinates: 38.3286795°N 21.4158223°E

Administration
- Greece
- Region: Western Greece
- Regional unit: Aitolia-Acarnania

Demographics
- Population: 15 (2011)

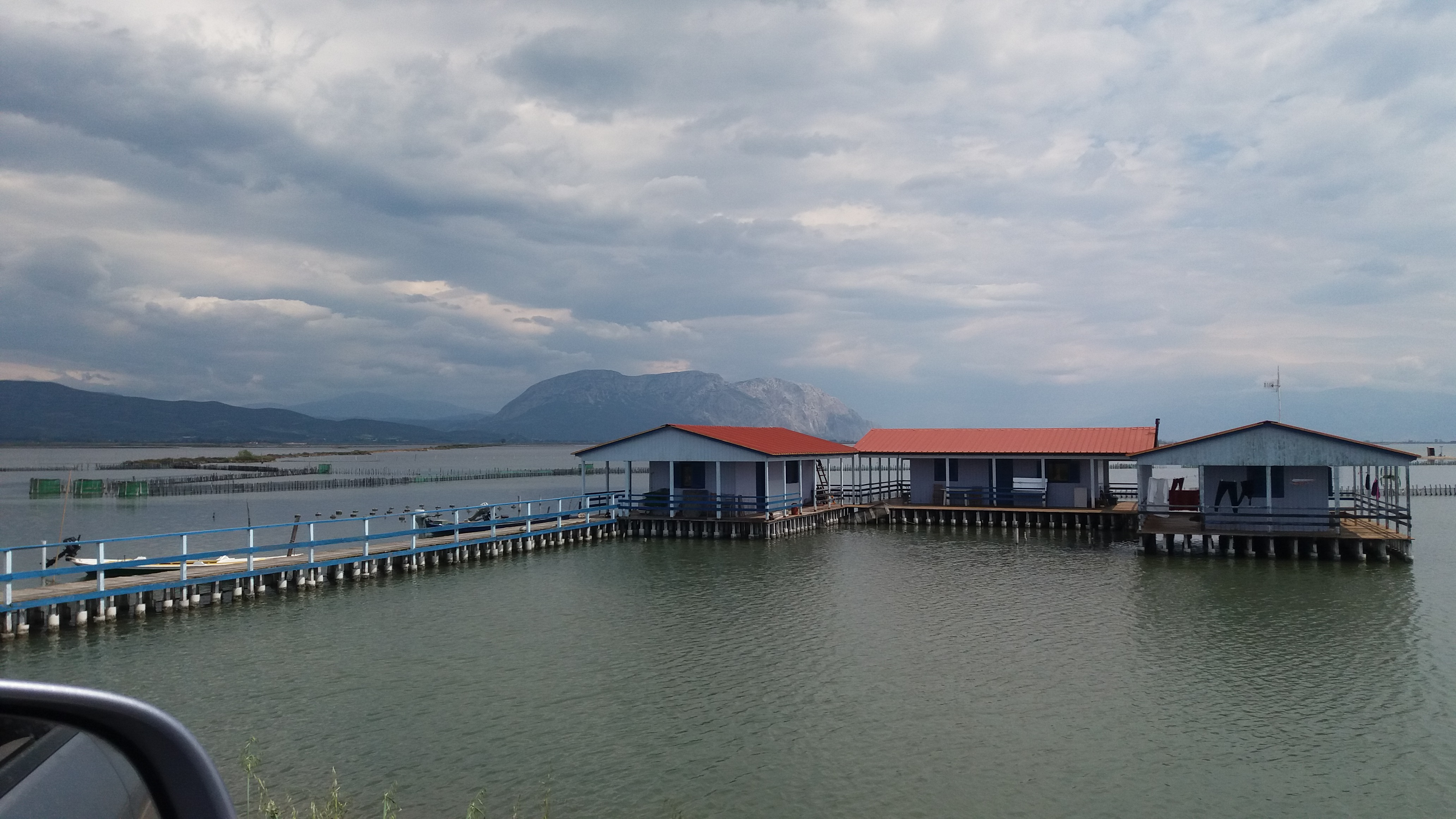
"Pelades" in Tourlida village, Mesologi Lagoon.

Tourlida (Greek: Τουρλίδα) is an island in the Missolonghi Lagoon, in Greece. It is a long-narrow earthy land about 5 km south of Missolonghi. Tourlida is the largest lagoon island of Missolonghi lagoon and the only inhabited one. Its population was 15 according to 2011 census. Stilt houses built on piles by local fishermen are called Pelades (Πελάδες) in Greek.

== History ==
Tourlida is named after the bird Eurasian curlew that is named tourlida in Greek and it is common in lagoon. The island was joined with the opposite land with a road that was constructed in 1885 thanks to domestic politician Charilaos Trikoupis. The road created an interior lagoon inside Missolonghi Lagoon, known as Kleisova Lagoon. The most common activity in the island is the fishing as well as the gathering of salt from the nearby salt pit.

=== Historical population ===
Census	Settlement
1991	34
2001	110
2011	15
