= Pavlos Karakostas =

Pavlos Karakostas (Παύλος Καρακώστας, 1937–2002) was a Greek author from Perdikaki Valtou (Acarnania - Greece). He was a qualified teacher and served as a School Master and later as a School Adviser in Athens. He also studied political sciences at the Panteion University. He served as well in many other positions of public interest(Head of the department for the foreign schools in the Ministry of Education 'especially colleges', general secretary of a committee of a certain Greek party for educational reforms, president of a teachers' association etc.).

== Literature ==
He published many articles of educational and other interest. He was also author of three books:

- Fifty years later (Πενήντα χρόνια μετά) Athens 1995 (Greek National Library, Classification No. BEI.-582-CKNQ).
- The trilateral (Ο Τρίπλευρος), Athens 1998
- To Sakaretsi (Το Σακαρέτσι, a book about the history of the village and especially its connection to the old Greek tribe known with the name 'Sarakatsanoi -Σαρακατσάνοι".Athens 1999, (Greek National Library, Classification No. ΝΦ-635-ΗΙΠΜ).
- Παρουσία (parousia) - Τόμος 3ος (vol. 3) - Τεύχος 15 (No. 15) - Ιανουάριος - Μάρτιος 2001 (January - March 2001), σελ. 25 (p. 25)- ΄Αρθρο του Παύλου Καρακώστα (article by Pavlos Karakostas) - "Χριστόδουλος ο Ακαρνάν στον Τρίβο του Νεοελληνικού Διαφωτισμού- Christodule of Acarnania in the struggle for the Greek enlightenment" σελ. 8-10
