= Chalkiopoulo =

Chalkiopoulo Χαλκιόπουλο
- Community
- Location within Greece
- Coordinates: 38°58′N 21°20′E
- Country: Greece
- Administrative region: West Greece
- Regional unit: Aetolia-Acarnania
- Municipality: Amfilochia
- Municipal unit: Inachos

Population (2021)
  - Community: 764
- Time zone: UTC+2 (EET)
  - Summer (DST): UTC+3 (EEST)

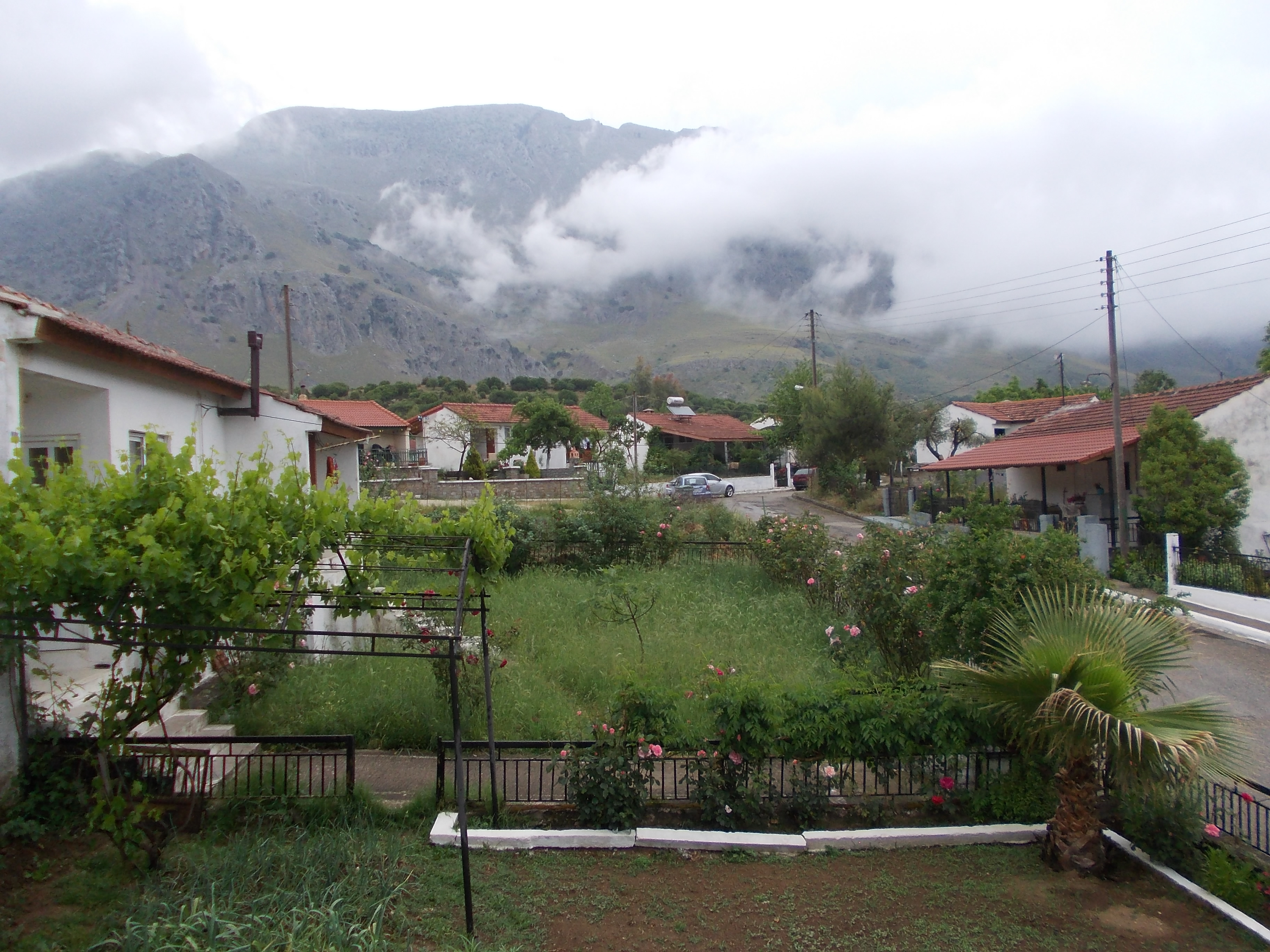
Neighborhood in Neo Chalkiopoulo

Chalkiopoulo (Greek: Χαλκιόπουλο) is a Greek village located in the northwest part of Aetolia-Acarnania. It is part of the municipal unit Inachos.

== History ==
The village existed during the struggle for the independence of Greece (1821-1829) and many of its members participated in this struggle, namely the families: Alexiou (Giannakis, Stavros), Valtinos (Athanasios, Kolios, Georgakis, Georgios, Ioannis, Panos, Dimitrios and Sotiris), Kontogiannis (Mitsos, Vaggelis, Nikolaos, Spyros), Mylonas Zacharis, Nikou Andreas, Sotiris Dimos, Christou Konstantinos, Christou or Seltsikas Spyros and others.

Chalkiopoulo appears in the list of Greece's villages which was issued by the Greek Kingdom (Otto king of Greece) after the independence (1832). The village belongs to the municipality of Inachos (΄Ιναχος) and the province of Valtos.

The original settlement is now mostly abandoned by its inhabitants (population 66 people according to the 2021 census). A new settlement was created along the bank of the river Inachos with the name "New Chalkiopoulo (Νέο Χαλκιόπουλο)". Authors Kostas Hatzopoulos and Mitsou Andreas derive their origin from Chalkiopoulo.

== Neo Chalkiopoulo ==
Neo Chalkiopoulo has a population of 533 inhabitants (2021). The altitude of the new village is 270 meters above the sea level. The new village has a health center which provides primary health services to all the people in the municipality of Inachous. Additionally, a marketplace is present, with various goods available.

== Agios Vlasios ==
The population of Agios Vlasios (Greek: Άγιος Βλάσιος) was 15 at the 2021 census. It is located near the old village of Chalkiopoulo, east of Neo Chalkiopoulo. The elevation is 770 meters above sea level.
