= Fyteies =

Fyteies Φυτείες
- Municipal unit
- Location within the regional unit

- Location within Greece
- Coordinates: 38°42′N 21°11′E
- Country: Greece
- Administrative region: West Greece
- Regional unit: Aetolia-Acarnania
- Municipality: Xiromero

Area
  - Municipal unit: 96.3 km^{2} (37.2 sq mi)

Population (2021)
  - Municipal unit: 1,812
  - Municipal unit density: 18.8/km^{2} (48.7/sq mi)
  - Community: 1,243
- Time zone: UTC+2 (EET)
  - Summer (DST): UTC+3 (EEST)

Fyteies (Greek: Φυτείες) is a village and a former municipality in Aetolia-Acarnania, West Greece, Greece. It is situated on a hill and parts of it are overlooking the lake Ozeros. Since the 2011 local government reform it is part of the municipality Xiromero (Astakos area) of which it is a municipal unit, though traditionally the schooling of locals was grouped with other villages lying to the north (e.g. Katouna). The municipal unit has an area of 96.295 km^{2}. Population 1,812 (2021).

A few kilometres away is located the monastery of Ligovitsi.
