= Tatarna Bridge =

Coordinates: 38.9705°N 21.4914°E

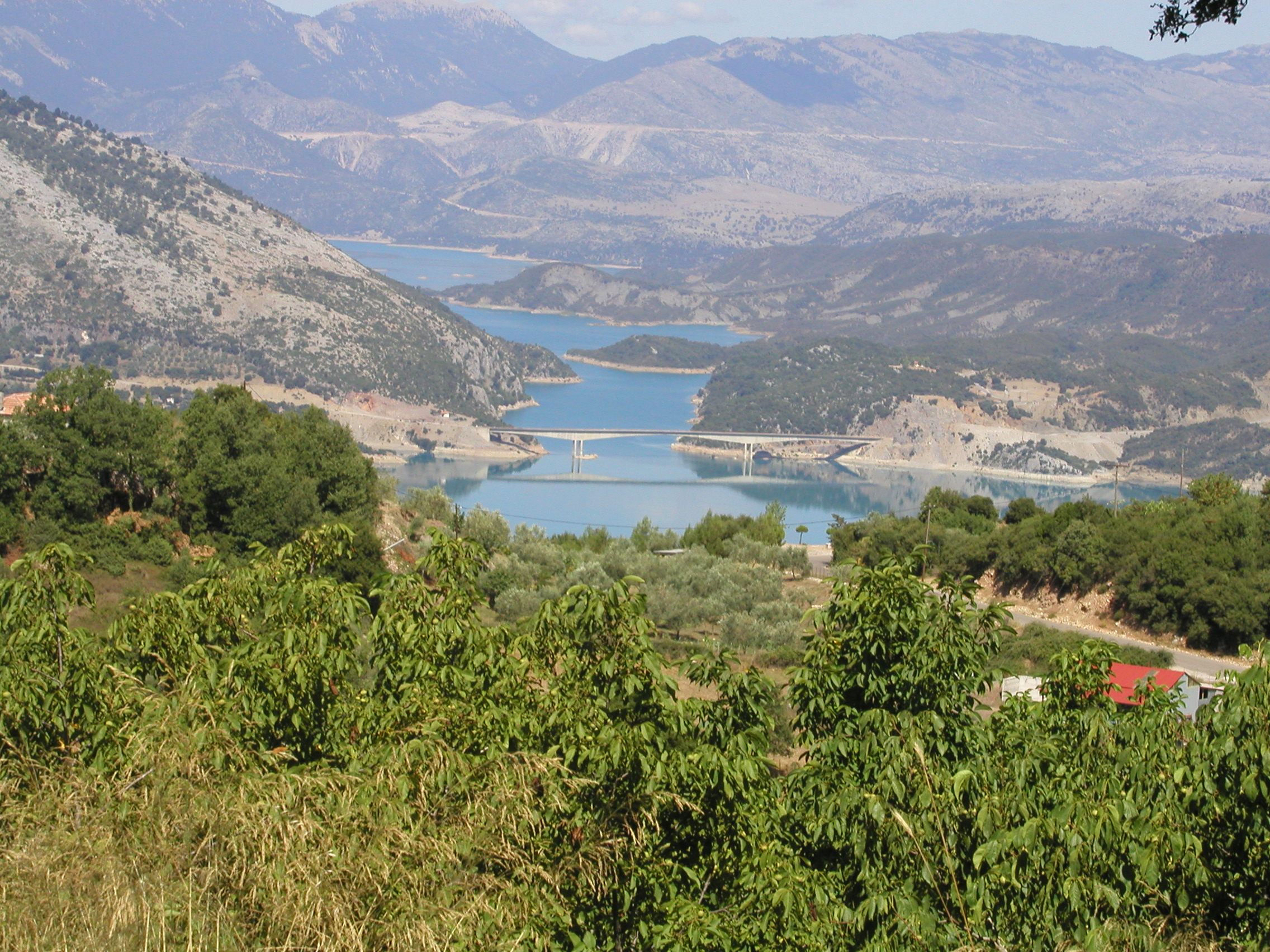
Tatarna Bridge in Greece

The Tatarna Bridge (Greek: Γέφυρα Τατάρνας) is a bridge over the Kremasta (place which belonged to the municipality of Alevrada Amfilochias) artificial lake (which was created after the building of a huge dam (160 meters high) in the narrowest point of the river Achelous). It was designed by Aristarchos Oikonomou, and built between 1971 and 1973. It is a box girder bridge with three spans; the largest span is 196 m. The bridge is situated on the border of the regional prefectures Aetolia-Acarnania and Evrytania. The nearest village is Triklino. The name Tatarna comes from a nearby monastery.

== History ==
In the same place there was a 17th-century arch stone bridge over the river Achelous. Adjacent to the old bridge was the largest spring of the Achelous, known to the locals by the name Mardacha (Μαρδάχα). Both the bridge and the spring were submerged when the Kremasta Dam was built in the 1960s and the area overflowed by the waters.

Near the old Tatarna bridge, the first battle of the Greeks from Roumeli against the Turks during the struggle for independence (1821) took place.

Not far from the new bridge is a hole in the ground. In that hole (according to the locals and other sources) many opponents of the National Liberation Front were thrown. A monument was erected nearby to remember the event.

== Notes ==
- Βασιλείου Ι. Πάνου (Vasileiou Panos)- Το Μοναστήρι της Τατάρνας (The Tatarna monastery) - Εκδόσεις Επιστημονικής Εταιρίας Ελληνικών Γραμμάτων "Πάπυρος" ('Papyros' Publications), Αθήνα (Athens) 1970.
- Φραγγίστα Επαμεινώνδα (Fragistas Epaminondas)- Ο Βίος του Κατσαντώνη (The life of Katsantoni)- Επανέκδοση με επιμέλεια Π.Βασιλείου (2nd edition by Vasileiou P.), Αθήνα (Athens) 1963
- Τζάνη Μιλτιάδη (Tzani Miltiades)- Ιστορικά σημειώματα της Ιεράς Μονής Τατάρνας (Historical Notes of the sacred monastery of Tatarna,Εφημερίδα "Λαός"(Newspaper "Laos"), Αγρίνιο (Agrinion) 15–12–1957.
- Λουκόπουλος Δ. (Loukopoulos Dimitrios)- Στ' ΄Αγραφα (In Agrapha) Αθήνα (Athens)1929.
- Παπαϊωάννου Κωνσταντίνος (Papaioannou Konstantinos)- Αλευράδα (Alevrada)- Αθήνα (Athens) 2007, (ISBN 978-960-631-817-7).
- Θεοχάρη Μαρία (Theochari Maria)- "Η ιστορική μονή της Τατάρνης - The histotical monastery of Tatarna)" - Εφημερίδα "Καθημερινή - 'Kathimerini' newspaper", 2/4/1963.
- Βασιλείου Ι.Πάνου - "Υπάρχουν στην Ευρυτανία τσιφλίκια; Οι σκλάβοι της Τατάρνας περιμένουν τη λύτρωσίν των", Εφημερίς "Ευρυτανία" 1/8/1929.
- Μαρίνου Θ. (Marinos Th.), Ο Εφιάλτης της Εθνικής Αντίστασης (The nightmare of National resistance), Αθήνα (Athens), 2000.
- Woodhouse, W. J., Aetolia: Its Geography, Topography and Antiquities, Oxford 1897.
- Χούτα Στυλιανού (Houtas Stylianos)- Εθνική Αντίσταση των Ελλήνων-The national resistance of the Greeks, Αθήνα (Athens, 1961.
- Αρχιμ.Δοσιθέου, Προσκύνημα στο Μοναστήρι της Τατάρνας, Εκδόσεις "Επτάλοφος", Αρδηττού 12–16, 116 36, Αθήνα 1985 (επανέκδοση 2007).(www.eptalofos.gr).
- Κουλούρης Νίκος (Koulouris Nikos), Ελληνική βιβλιογραφία του Εμφυλίου πολέμου, 1945-1949 (Greek bibliography of the civil war, 1945–1949). Αυτοτελή δημοσιεύματα, 1945-1999 (independent publications, 1945–1999), Φιλίστωρ, Αθήνα (Athens) 2000).
- Παπαϊωάννου Κώστας, Αλευράδα (Λαογραφική έρευνα), Αθήνα 2007 (ISBN 978-960-631-817-7).
- Βασιλείου Πάνου, Το μοναστήρι της Τατάρνας, Εκδόσεις Πάπυρος, Αθήνα 1979.
