= Astakos =

Astakos Αστακός
- Municipal unit
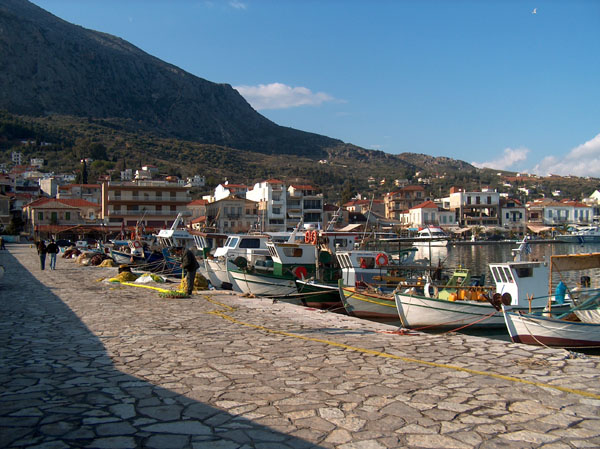

- Location within the regional unit

- Location within Greece
- Coordinates: 38°32′N 21°5′E
- Country: Greece
- Administrative region: West Greece
- Regional unit: Aetolia-Acarnania
- Municipality: Xiromero

Area
  - Municipal unit: 345.1 km^{2} (133.2 sq mi)
- Elevation: 10 m (33 ft)

Population (2021)
  - Municipal unit: 5,719
  - Municipal unit density: 16.57/km^{2} (42.92/sq mi)
  - Community: 2,617
- Time zone: UTC+2 (EET)
  - Summer (DST): UTC+3 (EEST)
- Postal code: 300 06
- Area code: 26460
- Vehicle registration: AI, ME

Astakos (Greek: Αστακός, meaning "lobster") is a town and a former municipality in Aetolia-Acarnania, West Greece, Greece. Since the 2011 local government reform it is part of the municipality Xiromero, of which it is a municipal unit. The municipal unit has an area of 345.099 km^{2}. It is located on a bay on the eastern shore of the Ionian Sea, near the southern end of the Acarnanian Mountains. It takes its name from the ancient Acarnanian town Astacus (Ancient Greek: Ἄστακος - Astakos), and was named Dragamesti in the Middle Ages. It is speculated to be the site of ancient Dulichium.

It is 16 km southeast of Kalamos (island), 30 km southwest of Agrinio, 35 km northwest of Missolonghi and 55 km southeast of Preveza.

== Subdivisions ==
The municipal unit Astakos is subdivided into the following communities (constituent villages in brackets):

- Agrampela
- Astakos (Astakos, Valti)
- Bampini
- Karaiskakis
- Machairas
- Chrysovitsa
- Palaiomanina
- Prodromos
- Skourtou
- Strongylovouni (Strongylovouni, Manina Vlizianon)
- Vasilopoulo
- Vliziana

== Economy ==
The city has a port able to hold ferries. The countryside mainly produces wheat, corn and few grapes. Fishing is an important source of income.

== Historical population ==
Year	Community	Municipal unit
1981	2,724	-
1991	2,459	8,210
2001	2,560	7,330
2011	2,732	6,578
2021	2,617	5,719

== Noteworthy persons ==
- Léon d'Ymbault (b. circa 1700 - d. 1781 in Czernowitz, now Chernivtsi, Ukraine), last Moldavian mayor of Czernowitz before the annexation of Bukovina by Austria in 1775
- Leo Leandros (b. 1926), singer and composer

== In popular culture ==
- Astakos is also the birthplace of the fictional characters Xeones and Diomache in Steven Pressfield's novel Gates of Fire. Cousins Xeones and Diomache both survive the sack of Astakos by Argos (cir. 500 BC); Xeones later becomes a perioikoi of Sparta and serves at the Battle of Thermopylae as a squire to the Spartiate Dienekes.

== See also ==
- List of settlements in Aetolia-Acarnania
- List of cities in ancient Acarnania
