= Sparto =

Village in Greece

Sparto Σπάρτο
- Community
- Location within Greece
- Coordinates: 38°54′04″N 21°06′29″E
- Country: Greece
- Administrative region: Western Greece
- Regional unit: Aetolia-Acarnania
- Municipality: Amfilochia
- Municipal unit: Amfilochia

Population (2021)
  - Community: 447
- Time zone: UTC+2 (EET)
  - Summer (DST): UTC+3 (EEST)

Sparto (Greek: Σπάρτο) is a village and a community in Aetolia-Acarnania, Greece. It is situated at the southeastern shore of the Ambracian Gulf, 7 kilometres (4.3 mi) northwest of the town Amfilochia. The community consists of the villages Sparto, Pigadaki and Tria Alonia.
