= Xiromero =

Xiromero Ξηρόμερο
- Municipality
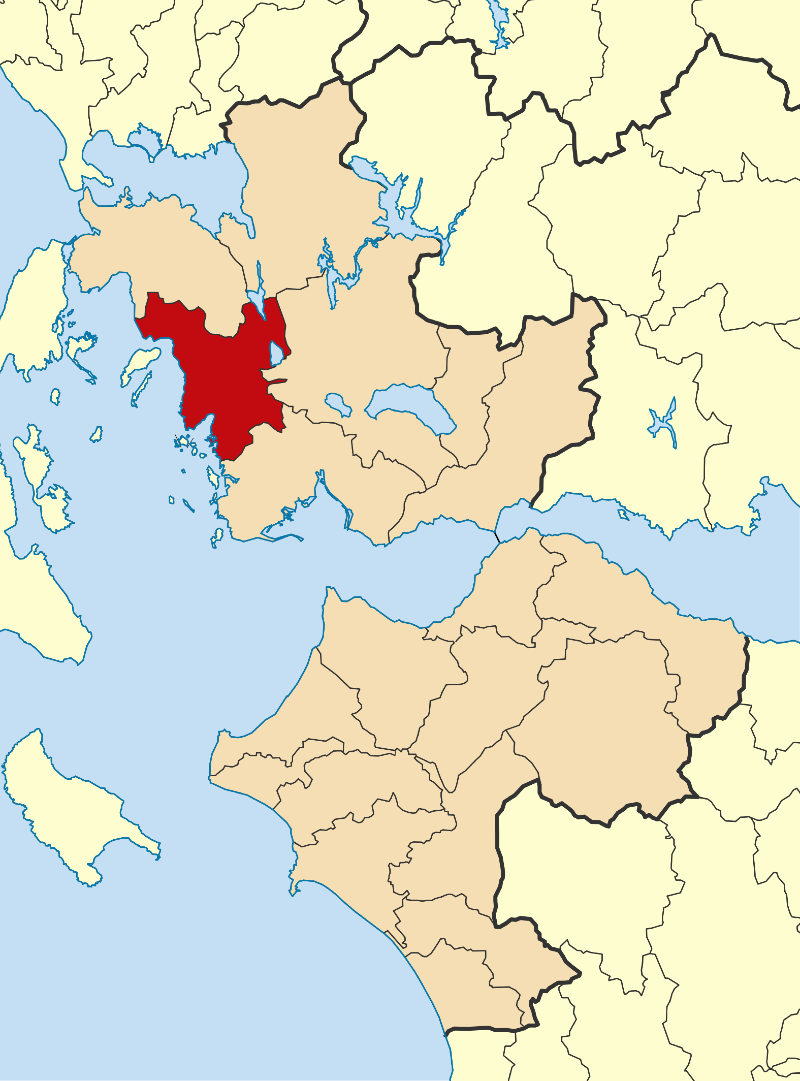

- Location within Greece
- Coordinates: 38°32′N 21°5′E
- Country: Greece
- Administrative region: West Greece
- Regional unit: Aetolia-Acarnania

Area
  - Municipality: 590.1 km^{2} (227.8 sq mi)

Population (2021)
  - Municipality: 10,206
  - Density: 17.30/km^{2} (44.79/sq mi)
- Time zone: UTC+2 (EET)
  - Summer (DST): UTC+3 (EEST)
- Website: https://www.dimosxiromerou.gr/

Xiromero (Greek: Ξηρόμερο) is a municipality in the Aetolia-Acarnania regional unit, West Greece region, Greece. The seat of the municipality is the town Astakos. Its borders do not coincide with the historical region of Xiromero, which extends to parts of the territory of the neighbouring municipality of Aktio-Vonitsa and most notably the area around Katouna. The municipality has an area of 590.113 km^{2}.

== Municipality ==
The municipality Xiromero was formed at the 2011 local government reform by the merger of the following 3 former municipalities, that became municipal units:

- Alyzia
- Astakos
- Fyteies
