= Amfilochia =

Amfilochia Αμφιλοχία
- Municipality
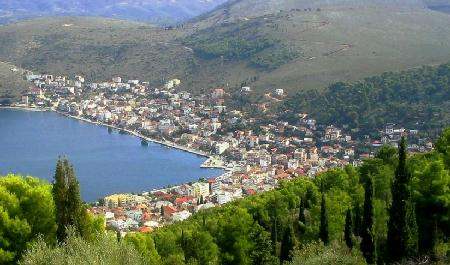

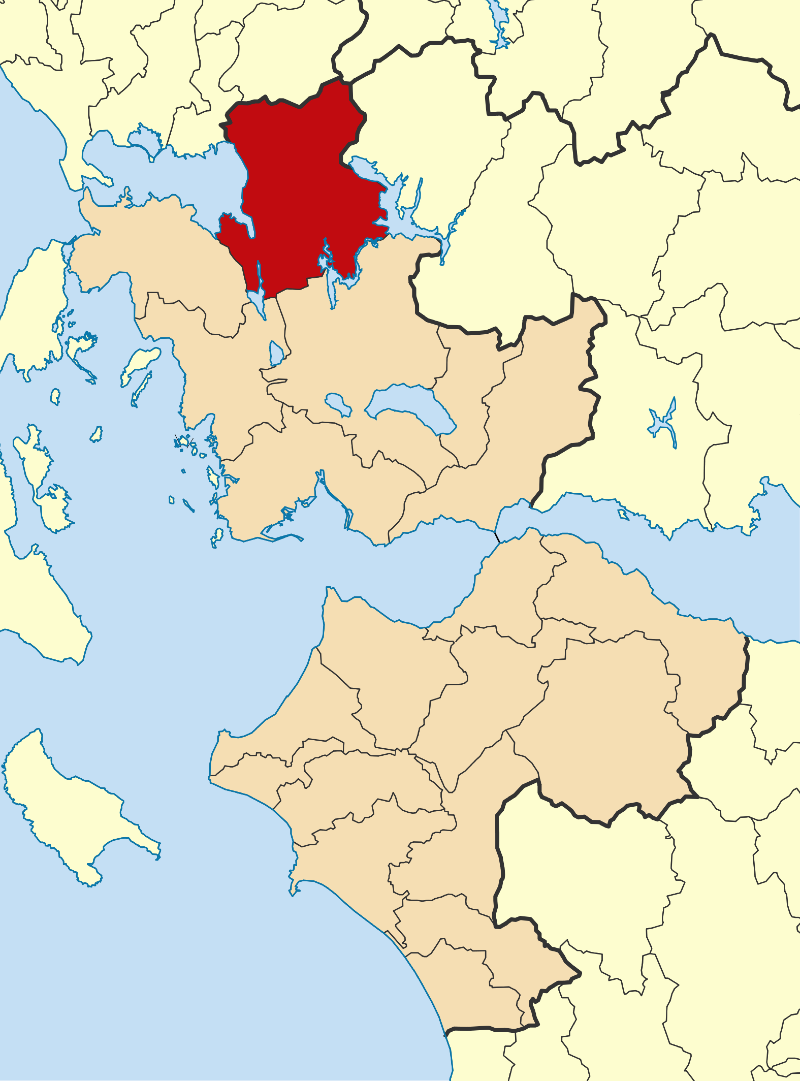

- Location within Greece
- Coordinates: 38°51′N 21°10′E
- Country: Greece
- Administrative region: West Greece
- Regional unit: Aetolia-Acarnania

Area
  - Municipality: 1,091.0 km^{2} (421.2 sq mi)
  - Municipal unit: 397.9 km^{2} (153.6 sq mi)

Population (2021)
  - Municipality: 14,979
  - Density: 13.730/km^{2} (35.560/sq mi)
  - Municipal unit: 9,154
  - Municipal unit density: 23.01/km^{2} (59.58/sq mi)
  - Community: 4,241
- Time zone: UTC+2 (EET)
  - Summer (DST): UTC+3 (EEST)
- Postal code: 305 00
- Area code: 26420

Amfilochia (Greek: Αμφιλοχία) is a town and a municipality in the northwestern part of Aetolia-Acarnania in Greece, on the site of ancient Amfilochia. Under the Ottoman Empire, it was known as Karvasaras (Καρβασαράς; Kervansaray in Turkish, lit. "caravanserai").

Amfilochia is situated by the Ambracian Gulf and features an amphitheatre. Amfilochia dates back to the ancient times and also features the ancient cities of Amphilochian Argos and Limnaia (or Limnaea).

== History ==
According to Pausanias, the settlement is named after king Amphilochos, son of Amphiaraus. After the fall of Troy, Amphilochos settled in the area, which consequently was called Amphilochoi until the time of Pausanias.

Under the Ottoman Empire, Ali Pasha of Ioannina, forcibly relocated residents of another village to the current location of the town and established a motel (serai in Turkish) to serve passing caravans. This was how the name Karvasaras came up.

In July 1944 a battle took place in the town between ELAS of the Greek Resistance against the occupation forces and their local collaborators, that resulted in victory for the Resistance.

== Municipality ==
The municipality Amfilochia was formed at the 2011 local government reform by the merger of the following 3 former municipalities, that became municipal units:

- Amfilochia
- Inachos
- Menidi

The municipality has an area of 1090.991 km^{2}, the municipal unit 397.879 km^{2}.

=== Subdivisions ===
The municipal unit of Amfilochia is divided into the following communities:

- Amfilochia (Amfilochia, Boukka, Limnaia and Platos)
- Ampelaki (Ampelaki, Amfilochiko Argos, Ariada, Kampos and Keramidi)
- Anoixiatiko (Anoixiatiko, Agia Triada, Katafourko, Mavrorachi, Moni Retha, Xirolivado, Petralona, Profitis Ilia, Ptelea, Skreiko, Triantafylloula, Tsoukka, Psila Alonia)
- Kechrinia (Kechrinia, Agioi Theodoroi, Kanalos, Kompothekla, Makrychoria, Falangias)
- Loutro (Loutro, Krikellos, Xirakia)
- Megas Kampos
- Sardinia (Sardinia, Kalyvia)
- Sparto (Sparto, Pigadaki, Tria Alonia)
- Stanos
- Varetada

== Population ==
| Year | Town | Community | Municipal unit | Municipality |
|---|---|---|---|---|
| 1981 | - | 6,637 | - | - |
| 1991 | 4,392 | - | 13,711 | - |
| 2001 | 4,119 | 4,681 | 12,834 | - |
| 2011 | 3,827 | 4,325 | 10,264 | 17,056 |
| 2021 | 3,791 | 4,241 | 9,154 | 14,979 |

== Transport ==
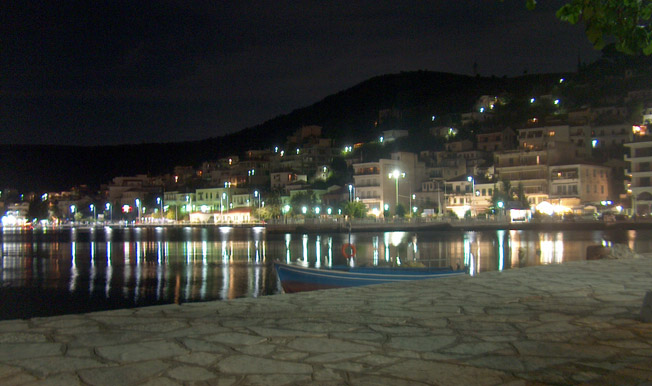
Amfilochia port at night

Amfilochia has a port which is sometimes used for the import of grain. The main roads passing through the town are the EO5 and EO42 national roads, with the former leading to the A5 motorway (which bypasses the town), and the latter leading to the A52. The A5 and A52 intersect within the municipality, near Lake Amvrakia. Amfilochia is not linked with a railway.

== Notable people ==
- Kyriakos Sfetsas (born 1945), composer
- Nikolaos Stratos (1872–1922), politician and Prime Minister of Greece
- Andreas Stratos (1905–1981), politician and historian
- Vlasios Tsirogiannis, military officer

== See also ==
- List of cities in ancient Epirus

A part of this article is translated from the German Wikipedia
