= Aetolian League =

Confederation of tribal communities and cities in ancient Greece

League of the Aetolians Ancient Greek: Κοινὸν τῶν Αἰτωλῶν Koinon tōn Aitōlōn
- 4th century BC–2nd century BC
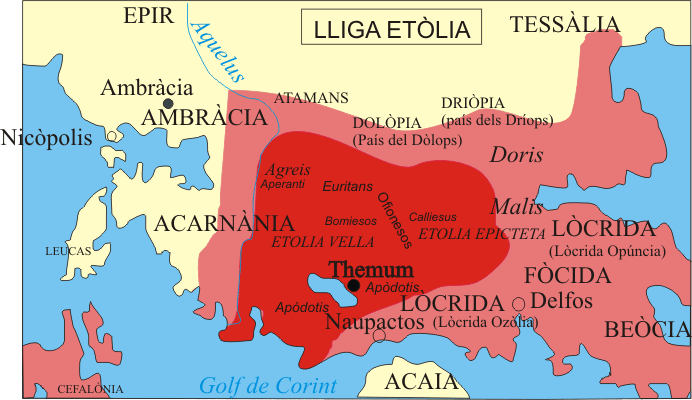
- Capital: Thermos (Aetolia) (meeting place)
- Common languages: Northwest Doric, Northwest Doric Koine
- Religion: Ancient Greek religion
- Government: Confederation of tribal communities and cities
- Strategos
- Legislature: Aetolian assembly
- Historical era: Classical Antiquity
  - Establishment: 4th century BC
  - Gallic invasion of Greece: 279 BC
  - Aetolian War: 192-188 BC
  - Roman client state: 2nd century BC
Preceded by
Aetolia
Delphi
Ozolian Locris
Opuntian Locris
Achaia Phthiotis
Malis (region)
Oetaea
Doris (Greece)
Phocis (ancient region)
Succeeded by
Epirus (Roman province)
Achaia (Roman province)
Macedonia (Roman province)
- Today part of: Greece

The Aetolian League, also known as the League of the Aetolians (Ancient Greek: Κοινὸν τῶν Αἰτωλῶν), was an ancient Greek confederation of tribal communities and cities. Thermon served as its meeting place. At its peak in the 3rd century BC, in the aftermath of the Celtic invasion, it covered much of Central Greece and became one of the major powers of Hellenistic Greece.

It was probably established during the late Classical or the early Hellenistic era in Aetolia. Two annual meetings were held, during the Panaetolika and the Thermica festivals. The League had a complex political and administrative structure. During the classical period the Aetolians were not highly regarded by other Greeks, who considered them to be semi-barbaric and reckless. However, after their victory against the Gauls in 279 BC, they emerged as a dominant state in central Greece and expanded by annexing several Greek city-states to their League. The league occupied Delphi and steadily gained territory during the 3rd century BC. At its peak, the league's territory included Ozolian Locris, Ainis, Oetaea, Malis, Doris, Phocis, Dolopia, Opuntian Locris, Achaia Phthiotis, parts of Acarnania, Cephalonia and Ambracia.

In the latter part of its power, certain Greek city-states out of central Greece joined the Aetolian League such as Lysimachia in Thrace, the Arcadian cities of Mantineia, Tegea, Phigalia and Kydonia on Crete. The Aetolian League fought against Macedon and the Achaean League in the Social War (220-217 BC). It allied with Rome in the First and Second Macedonian War, but then, it fought against the Romans in an alliance with the Seleucid Empire in the Aetolian War. It became a Roman client state in 188 BC.

== History ==
=== Early History ===
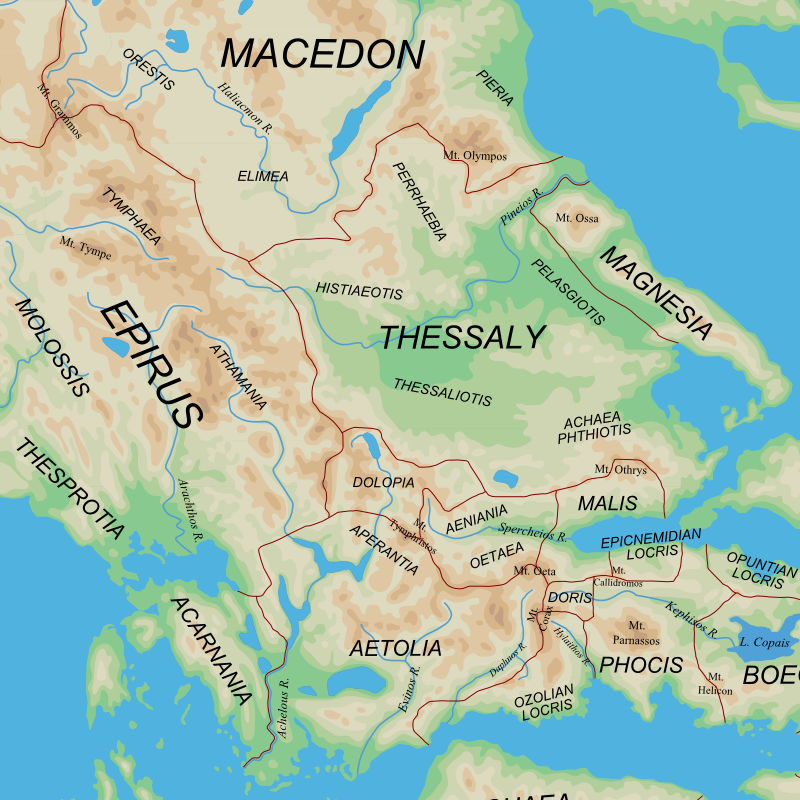
Ancient regions of central Greece including Aetolia, prior to its expansion

==== Aetolian tribes ====
The Aetolians were a recognised ethnic group with a religious centre at Thermos from at least the seventh century BC. The mountain tribes of Aetolia were the Ophioneis, the Apodotoi, the Agraeis, the Aperantoi and the Eurytanians. The primitive lifestyle of those tribes made an impression on ancient historians. Polybius doubted their Greek heritage. They worshiped Apollo as god of tame nature and Artemis as goddess of wilderness. They also worshiped Athena, not as goddess of wisdom, but emphasizing the element of war – i.e. a goddess that was a counterbalance to the god Ares. They called Apollo and Artemis "Laphrios gods," i.e. patrons of the spoils and loot of war. In addition, they worshiped Hercules, the river Achelous and Bacchus. In Thermos, an area north of Trichonis lake, there was after the 7th century a shrine of Apollo “Thermios,” which became a significant religious center during the time of the Aetolian League.

==== Demosthenes' Aetolian campaign ====
During the Peloponnesian War, when the Athenians led by Demosthenes invaded Aetolia in 426 BC, they were forced to retreat by the Aetolians. In the course of the fourth century, the league offered passive support to more powerful states and was rewarded for it, receiving Aeolis from the Thebans in 367 BC and Naupactus from Philip II of Macedon in 338 BC.

==== Foundation of the League ====
Sometime in the 4th century BC, the Koinon tōn Aitōlōn (League of the Aetolians) was founded, but it is uncertain when. One suggestion is that the league was founded by Epaminondas in 367 BC. Grainger believes that it was founded much later, around the time of the rise of Philip II of Macedon. Archaeology indicates that settlements in Aetolia began to grow in size and complexity over the course of this century.

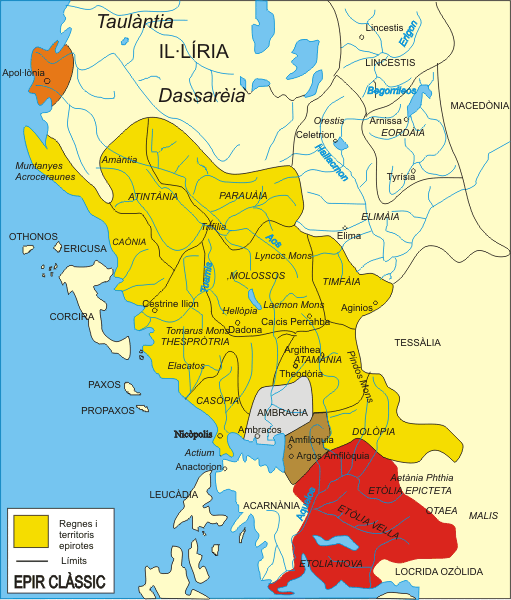
Aetolia and regions of ancient Epirus

After the death of Philip II in 336 BC, the Aetolians joined the Thebans in opposing Alexander the Great and the stress of their defeat caused the league to implode. Over the next decade it seems to have been reconstituted and in the later years of Alexander's reign the Aetolians seized Oeniadae against his will. The Aetolian League joined the Athenians in the Lamian war against Antipater which broke out after Alexander's death in 323 BC.

=== Rise of the Aetolian League ===
Around 301 BC, the Aetolians took control of Parnassus, including the panhellenic sanctuary of Delphi, which they would continue to control for over a century. Demetrius Poliorcetes launched a war in 289 BC, against their ally Pyrrhus of Epirus and attacked Aetolia but the Aetolians, not seeking battle, retreated to the nearby hills. A Fifth Sacred War, 281 BC, led by Areus I, the king of Sparta, was rebuffed by the Aetolians alone (allied to Antigonus Gonatas then) and in 280 BC, they took control of Heraclea in Trachis, which gave them control over the crucial pass at Thermopylae.

==== Gallic invasion ====
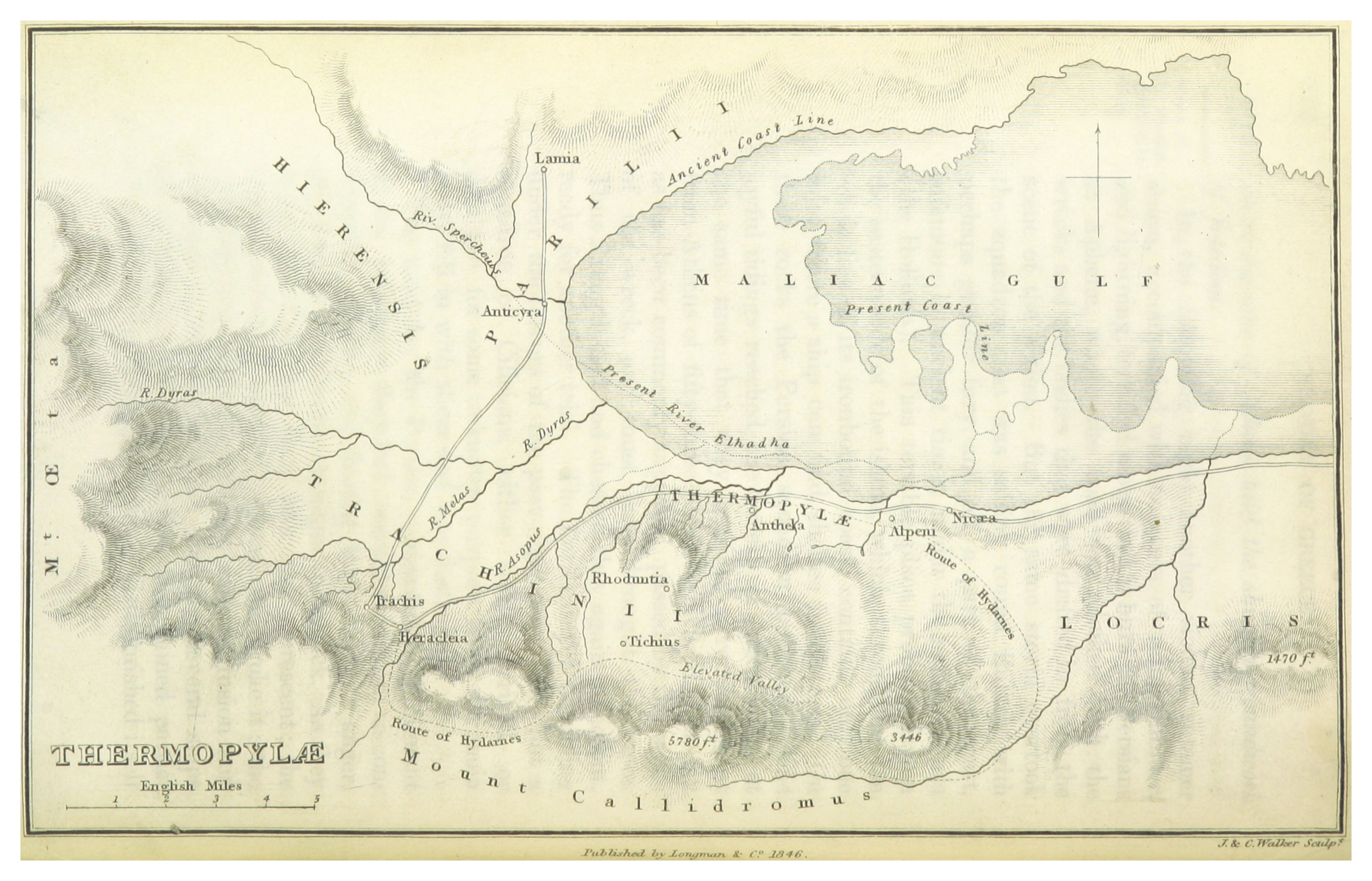
Map of 1876, depicting the coast line in the time of Herodotus, and the coast line at the time of the map (1876). Thermopylae pass is between Alpeni and Anthela.

In 279 BC, they defended central Greece against the Gallic invasion. At the Battle of Thermopylae (279 BC), during the initial assault, Brennus' forces suffered heavy losses. Hence he decided to send a large force under Acichorius against Aetolia. The Aetolian detachment, as Brennus hoped, left Thermopylae to defend their homes. The Aetolians all joined the defence – the old and women joining the fight. Realising that the Gallic sword was dangerous only at close quarters, the Aetolians resorted to skirmishing tactics. The Gauls destroyed Kallion, on the border between Eurytania and rest of Aetolia, but the resistance of the entire Aetolian population at the site of Kokkalia dealt a decisive blow to the Galatian threat. According to Pausanias, only half the number who had set out for Aetolia returned. Eventually Brennus found a way around the pass at Thermopylae, but the Greeks escaped by sea thanks to the Athenian fleet. They were finally victorious against the Gauls, when they threatened the sanctuary of Delphi. After their victory they earned the appreciation of the rest of the Greeks and they were admitted as a new member into the Amphictyonic League. The Portico of the Aetolians has been associated with the Aetolian League and its increased power and influence over Delphi in the 3rd century BC.

==== War with Demetrios Aetolicus ====
Besieged at Medion, the Acarnanians sought assistance from Demetrius II of Macedon, who had been at war with the Aetolians and in response brought Agron of Illyria into the conflict. In 232 BC, the Illyrians under Agron attacked the Aetolians, and managed to take many prisoners and booty. In 229 BC, the Aetolians participated in a naval battle off the island of Paxos in a coalition with Korkyra and the Achaean League, and were defeated by a coalition of Illyrians and Acarnanians; as a result, the Korkyreans were forced to accept an Illyrian garrison in their city, which was put under the command of Demetrius of Pharos.

Irwin Merker suggests that when Demetrius II Aetolicus and the Aetolian League were at war, Dropion of Paeonia was involved as an ally of the Aetolians.

==== Social and Lyttian Wars ====
In the Social War, 220-217 BC, and the Lyttian War the Aetolian League fought against the Achaean League and Antigonid Macedonia. Philip V of Macedon invaded Aetolia and sacked the city of Thermon as a response to the Aetolians' invasion at the city of Dodona in Epirus, and Dion in Macedonia.

=== Macedonian and Aetolian Wars ===
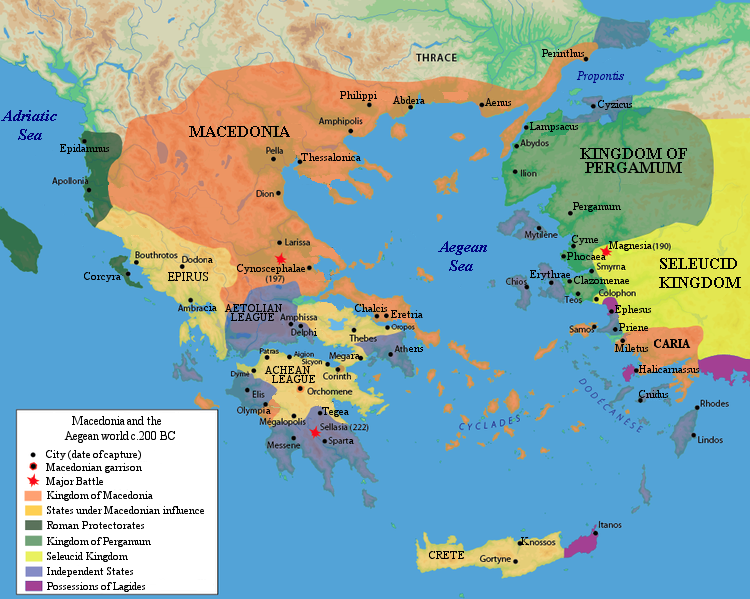
Territory of the Aetolian League in 200 BC.

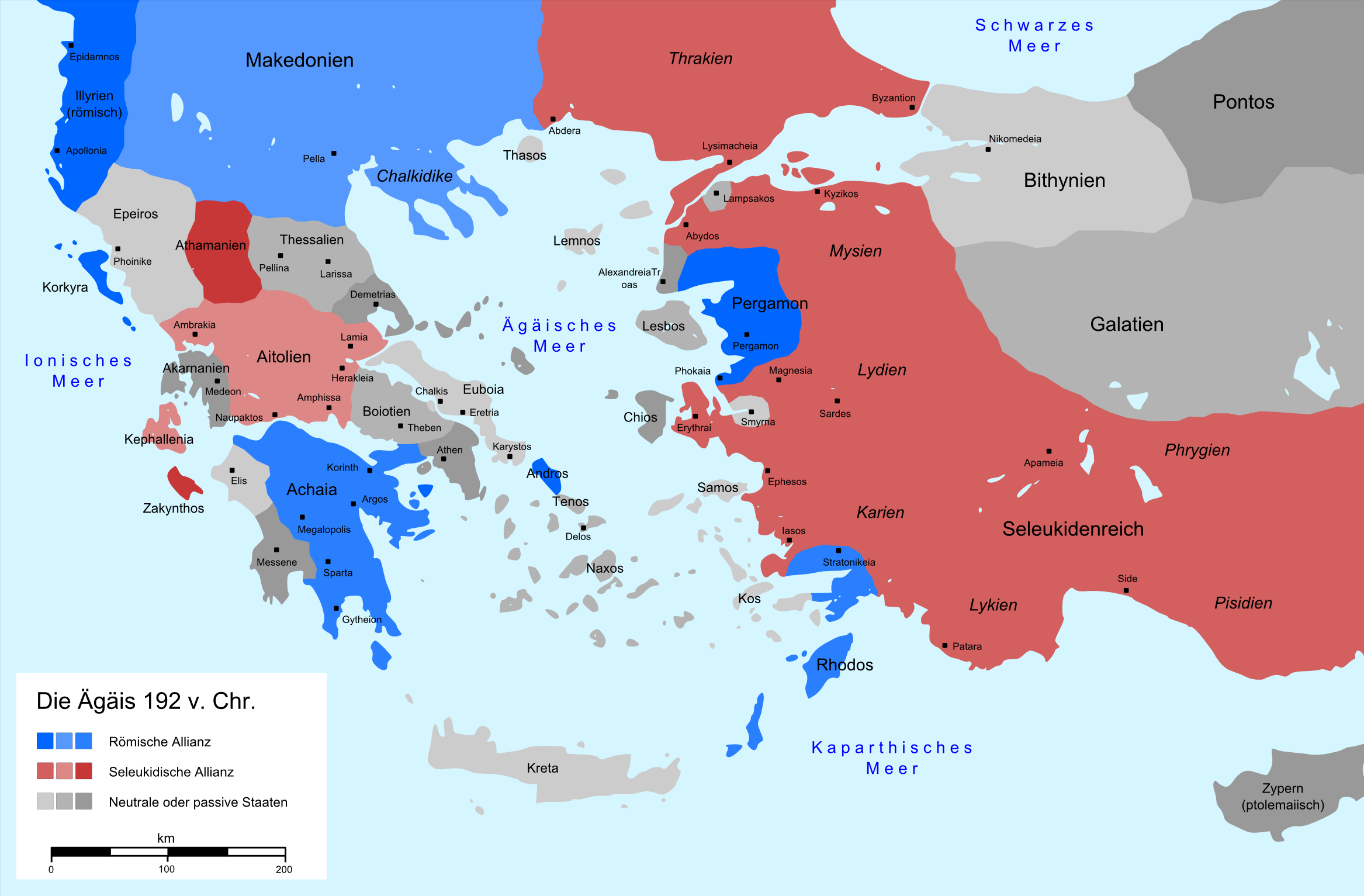
The Aegean world at the outbreak of the war in 192 BC Seleucid Empire and allies Roman Republic and allies Neutral states

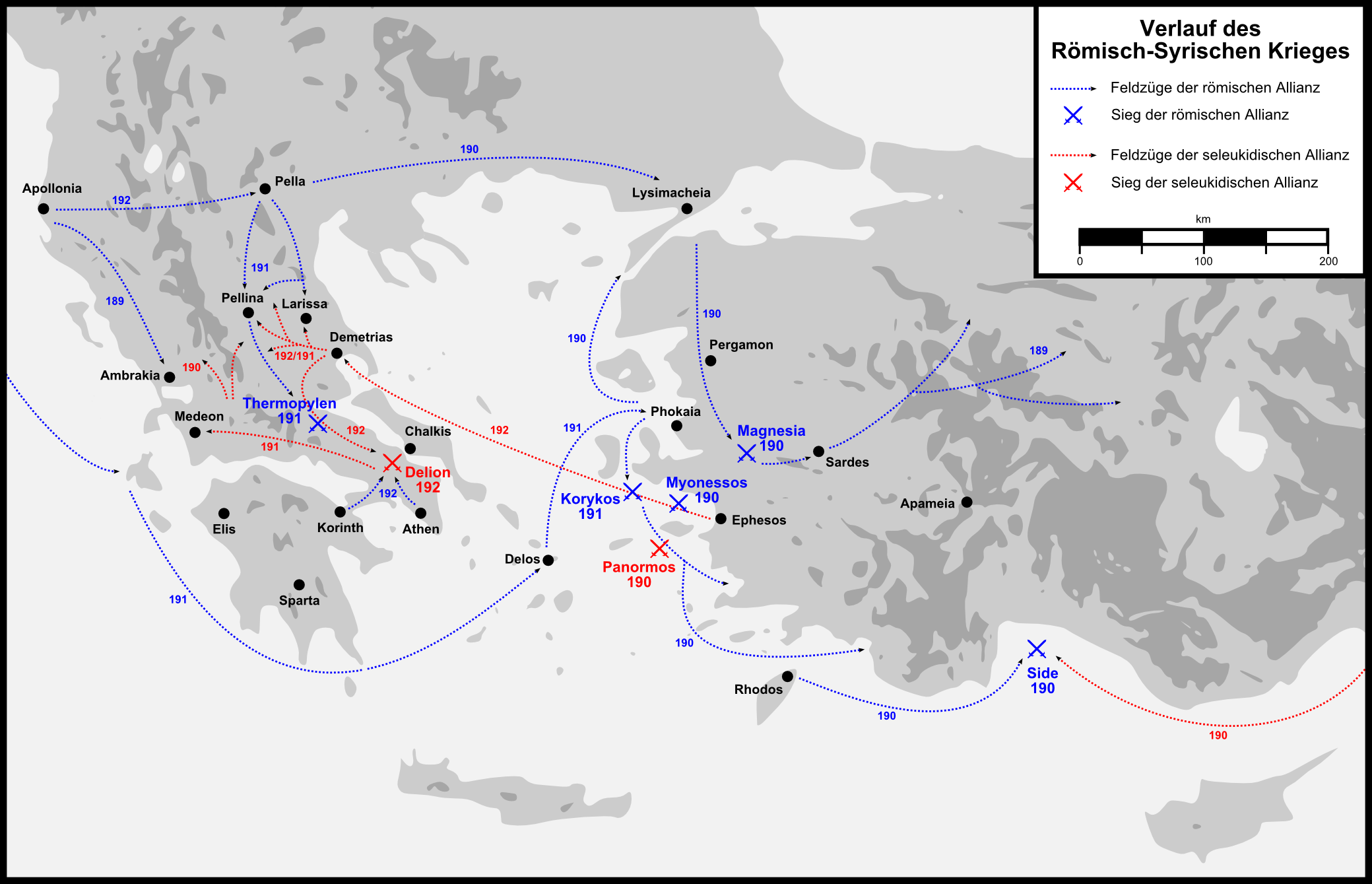
The course of the war, with locations of key battles

The league was the first Greek ally of the Roman Republic in the Greek mainland, siding with the Romans during the First Macedonian War, 214-205 BC, then allied to Philip V of Macedon at the Cretan War (205–200 BC) and then again sided with Romans helping them defeat Philip at the Battle of Cynoscephalae in 197 BC, during the Second Macedonian War. However, it grew increasingly hostile to Roman involvement in Greek affairs and only a few years later sided with Antiochus III the Great, the king of the Seleucid Empire, during the Roman-Seleucid War, also called Aetolian War.

Roman forces in Greece, under Titus Quinctius Flamininus, largely withdrew after proclaiming its freedom from Roman control or taxation in 195 BC. Antiochus, at the same time, operated a large army in Europe against tribes in Thrace through 194, moving into the Roman power vacuum and conceiving of the Roman withdrawal as a retreat. At a meeting between Antiochus' envoys in Rome, ten legates speaking on behalf of the senate made their position clear behind closed doors: if Antiochus wanted peace he would have to stay on his side of the Hellespont and Bosphorus; if he did not do so Rome would maintain its rights to intervene in Asia to protect its allies. Provocatively, Flaminius – one of the legates – then gave a public oration before the senate proclaiming Roman intentions to free the Greeks in Asia Minor while Antiochus' ambassadors, from fear of starting a war and without authorisation to accept the Roman terms or to reject them, could only plead negotiations continue. The senate by spring 192, clarified its position and would accept peace provided that Antiochus remained in Thrace.

In late 193 BC, the Aetolian League – receptive to Antiochus' ambassadors as they returned from the embarrassment at Rome – sought to shake up the Roman settlement and draw both Rome and Antiochus into war for its own advantage. In September 192 BC, Aetolian general Thoantas arrived at Antiochus' court, convincing him to openly oppose the Romans in Greece. The Seleucids selected 10,000 infantry, 500 cavalry, 6 war elephants and 300 ships to be transferred for their campaign in Greece. The Aetolians moved to form an alliance between themselves, Philip in Macedon, and Nabis in Sparta. The plans for an alliance failed, but Nabis was sufficiently persuaded to invade coastal cities in Laconia; the nearby Achaean League responded by moving in reinforcements and dispatching an embassy to Rome; Rome responded by sending four ambassadors to remind the Greeks of their continued interests. After Flaminius, one of the ambassadors, spoke to the Aetolian League, it responded by passing a decree to invite Antiochus to liberate Greece and arbitrate the dispute between Rome and Aetolia. Philip V expected that the Romans would emerge victorious in the conflict and counted on territorial rewards as well as the writing off of war reparations that he owed; while the Seleucids could provide neither, so Antiochus' overtures were rejected and Philip aligned himself with the Romans. Antiochus likewise approached Athens, the Athamanians, the Boeotian League as well as city states in Acarnania and Epirus with offers of alliance. Despite the reassurances of the Aetolians, most of the Greek states remained neutral, fearing future reprisals. Only Elis, the Boeotian League and Amynander of Athamania declared their allegiance to Antiochus, the later being promised the Macedonian throne for his brother in law Philip of Megalopolis. This was a declaration of war and the Romans saw Antiochus' representatives in Aetolia as responsible. The Aetolians then moved troops to seize Sparta, Chalcis, and Demetrias. Successful only at Demetrias (the Aetolians assassinated Nabis but were stopped by Achaean intervention; Chalchis responded to the Aetolians with force) and able to convince Antiochus that the Greek cities were waiting enthusiastically to rebel against Rome, he landed at Demetrias and proclaimed he would liberate the Greeks from Roman subjugation. The Aetolians began spurring Greek states to jointly revolt under Antiochus' leadership against the Romans, hoping to provoke a war between the two parties.

This was the final provocation for the senate in Rome. The combination of the Aetolians and Antiochus was an unacceptable intrusion into Greece. The Romans responded by dispatching the praetor Aulus Atilius Serranus with a fleet to the Peloponnese and Marcus Baebius Tamphilus with two legions to Epirus. Further troops were levied and, in the new year of 191 BC, placed under the command of Manius Acilius Glabrio to conduct the war "against Antiochus and those in his empire". In December 192, the Seleucids and their Aetolian allies launched a campaign against the Thessalian League from the south, while the Athamanian army attacked from the west. Antiochus rapidly seized much of southern Thessaly, withdrawing to his winter quarters after running out of supplies. In early March 191 BC, the Seleucids invaded Acarnania, aiming at depriving the Roman fleet of ports on the western coast of Greece. After a brief campaign, Antiochus seized control of half of the Acarnanian League and gained the allegiance of its Strategos Klytos. At the same time Roman consul Manius Acilius Glabrio crossed from Brundisium to Illyria with an army of 20,000 infantry, 2,000 cavalry and 15 war elephants. Glabrio's army brought the total of the Roman and allied forces in Greece to 36,000 men, significantly outnumbering that of the Seleucids and their allies. In the meantime, Philip V and Roman propraetor Baebius launched parallel offensives in Thessaly and Athamania, quickly erasing Seleucid gains in the region. Glabrio and Philip's armies united at Limnaion before joining with that of Baebius at Pellina. Upon being alerted about the enemy's advance into Thessaly and the disintegration of the Athamanian army, Antiochus returned to Chalcis; gathering his scattered garrisons along the way.

Antiochus marched to Lamia with his entire force of 12,000 infantry, 500 cavalry and 16 war elephants, simultaneously ordering the Aetolians to mobilize there. Only 4,000 men answered his call, as the Aetolians feared that their homeland was on the brink of invasion. Fearing encirclement by a numerically superior force, the Seleucids withdrew to the Thermopylae pass. The Aetolian force was split into two armies of equal strength, garrisoning the cities of Hypata and Heraclea in Trachis; which blocked the roads to Aetolia and Thermopylae respectively. When the main bodies of the armies initially clashed at the Thermopylae pass, the Seleucids managed to hold their ground, repulsing multiple Roman assaults. However, a small Roman force under Marcus Porcius Cato managed to outflank the Seleucids from the hillside after surprising the Aetolian garrison of Fort Callidromus. The Seleucids panicked and broke ranks, leading to the destruction of their force. Antiochus managed to escape the battlefield with his cavalry, departing mainland Greece soon afterwards.

The defeat of Antiochus in 189 BC robbed the league of its principal ally and made it impossible to stand alone in continued opposition to Rome. In Greece, the war continued. The consul of 189 BC, Marcus Fulvius Nobilior, was assigned to continue the war after negotiations again failed. He besieged Ambracia and later in the year negotiated a final peace with both the Aetolians and the Cephallenians. Aetolia, initially faced with unbudging Roman demands from 191 BC onwards for an indemnity of one thousand talents – an unattainable sum – which was eventually lowered; after Rhodes mediated between them and was successful in convincing the Romans to accept an indemnity of 200 talents with a further 300 to be paid over the next six years. Aetolia also was reduced to a Roman client state, required exceptionally and explicitly to "minister to the power and empire of the Roman people".

== Administrative system ==
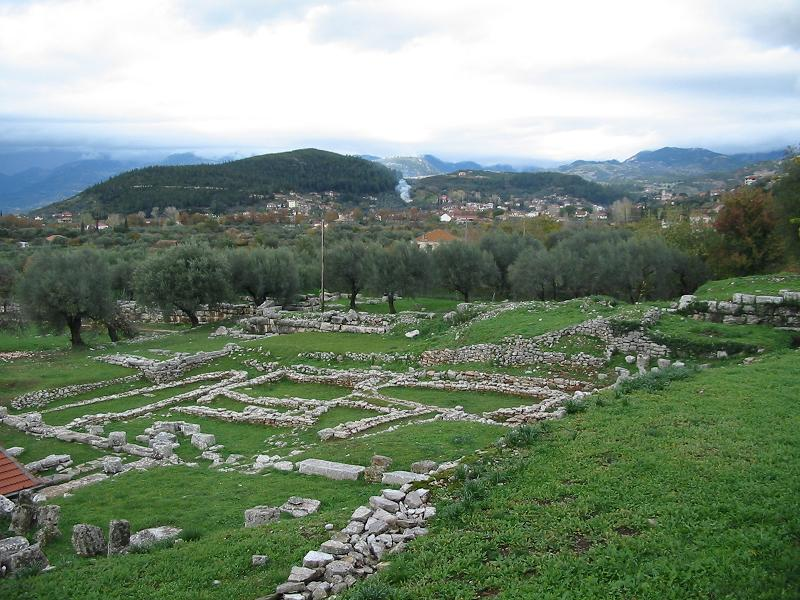
Thermos, sanctuary and assembly place of the Aetolian League

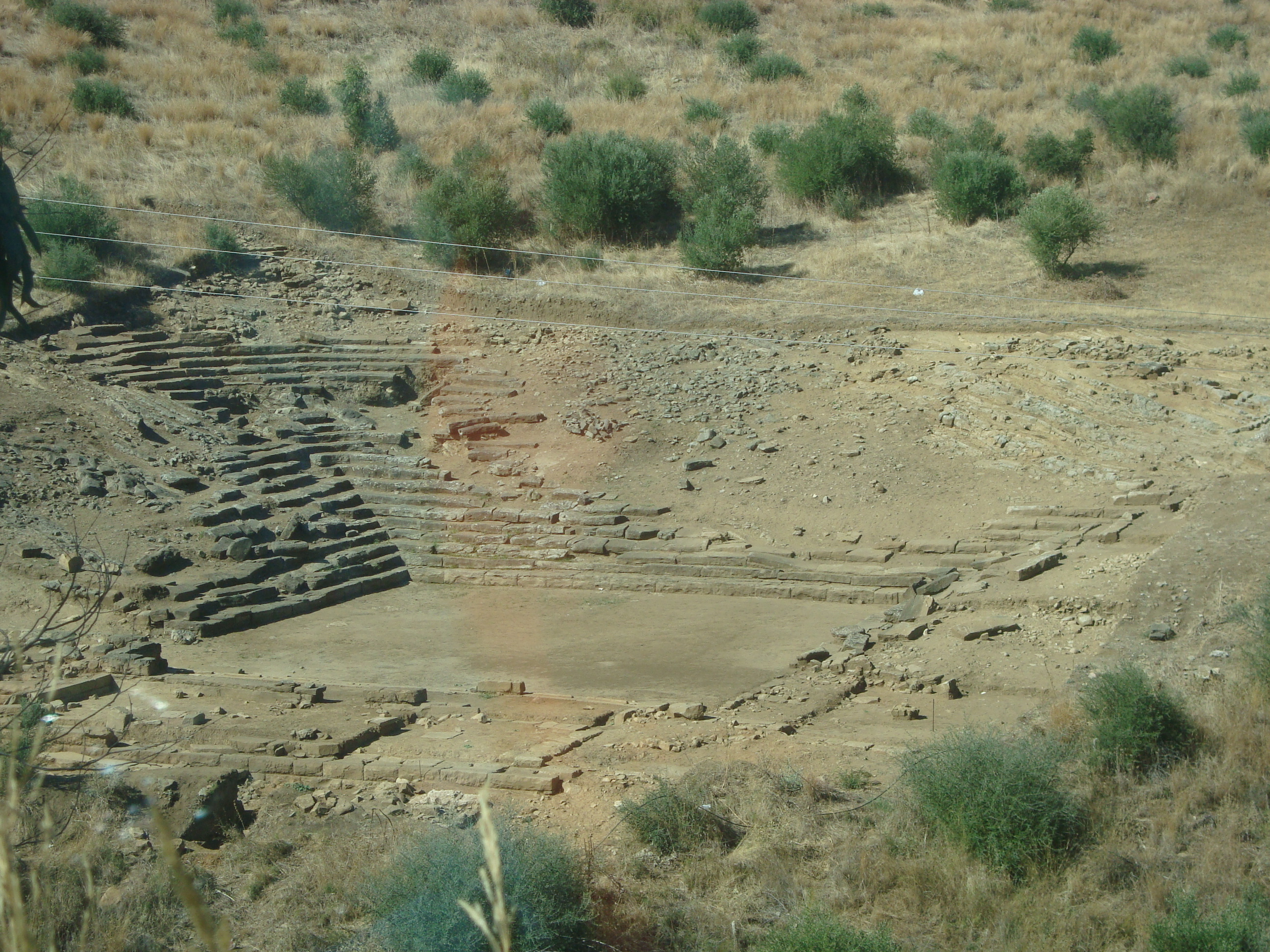
Theater of Calydon, Aetolia

The league had a federal structure, which could raise armies and conduct foreign policy on a common basis. It also implemented economic standardization, levying taxes, using a common currency and adopting a uniform system of weights and measures. There may not have been any central archive of state documents. However, the constituent communities of the league enjoyed substantial autonomy. At times the league was unable (or unwilling) to prevent its members from undertaking military actions against states that had treaties with it. The league members were grouped together in a number of tele (districts), which seem to have had administrative and juridical powers of some sort.

The league's central administrative apparatus consisted of an assembly, a council, and a number of magistrates. The Ekklesia (Assembly) was open to all citizens of all member communities of the league. The assembly was the ultimate authority within the league, with responsibility for declarations of war and peace, but its power was limited by the infrequency with which it met. Two meetings took place a year, one at the Thermica festival which was held at Thermos on the autumnal equinox and another in spring at the Panaetolica festival which took place at a different site each year. Emergency meetings could also be called.

The exact competencies of the Council, referred to as a boula or synedrion in different documents, relative to the Assembly are not clear. It consisted of delegates elected by each of the constituent communities of the league in proportion to their size. By the late third century BC it had around 1500 members - too large for it to have been in continuous session. A small portion of the council's members, known as the apokletoi ("Select-men"), conducted day-to-day business, such as sending and receiving embassies.

The league's archons (magistrates) were elected by the assembly each year at the Thermica. The chief executive was the strategos (General), who commanded the league's armies, received all diplomatic contacts from other states in first instance, and presided over meetings of the assembly, the council, and the select-men. The office could be held multiple times, but only after an interval of, probably, four years. The hipparchos (Cavalry Commander), originally a minor post, became the General's deputy from the late 260s BC, but his exact responsibilities are not clear. The third in command was the Grammateus (Secretary). These three officials were Eponymous archons (eponymous magistrates), which is to say that they were named in the dating formula for all decrees of the league. From around 260 BC, there were also seven tamiai (Treasurers) and seven epilektarchoi (Commanders of the Elite), who managed financial and military matters respectively. There were a number of boularchoi (Council Commanders) who seem to have been a steering committee for the Council. When these first appear in the 260s, there were two of them, but by the end of the third century BC they had risen to six or more, presumably as a result of the continued expansion of the league's membership (and thus of the size of the Council).

From 278 the league sent delegates to the Amphictyonic League (Delphic Amphictyony), gradually increasing over time until the league held a majority of the seats on the council, which increasingly became an instrument of Aetolian power projection. From the 260s, the secretary of the Amphictyonic council was always an Aetolian. These delegates seem to have been elected along with the other magistrates at the Thermica, but their relative rank is not clear.

== Language ==
=== Northwest Doric koine ===
The Northwest Doric koine refers to a supraregional North-West common variety that emerged in the third and second centuries BC, and was used in the official texts of the Aetolian League. Such texts have been found in W. Locris, Phocis, and Phthiotis, among other sites. It contained a mix of native Northwest Doric dialectal elements and Attic Greek forms. It was apparently based on the most general features of Northwest Doric, eschewing less common local traits.

Its rise was driven by both linguistic and non-linguistic factors, with non-linguistic motivating factors including the spread of the rival Attic-Ionic koine after it was recruited by the state of Macedon for administration, and the political unification of a vast territories by the Aetolian League and the state of Epirus. The Northwest Doric koine was thus both a linguistic and a political rival of the Attic-Ionic koine.

== Army of the Aetolian League ==
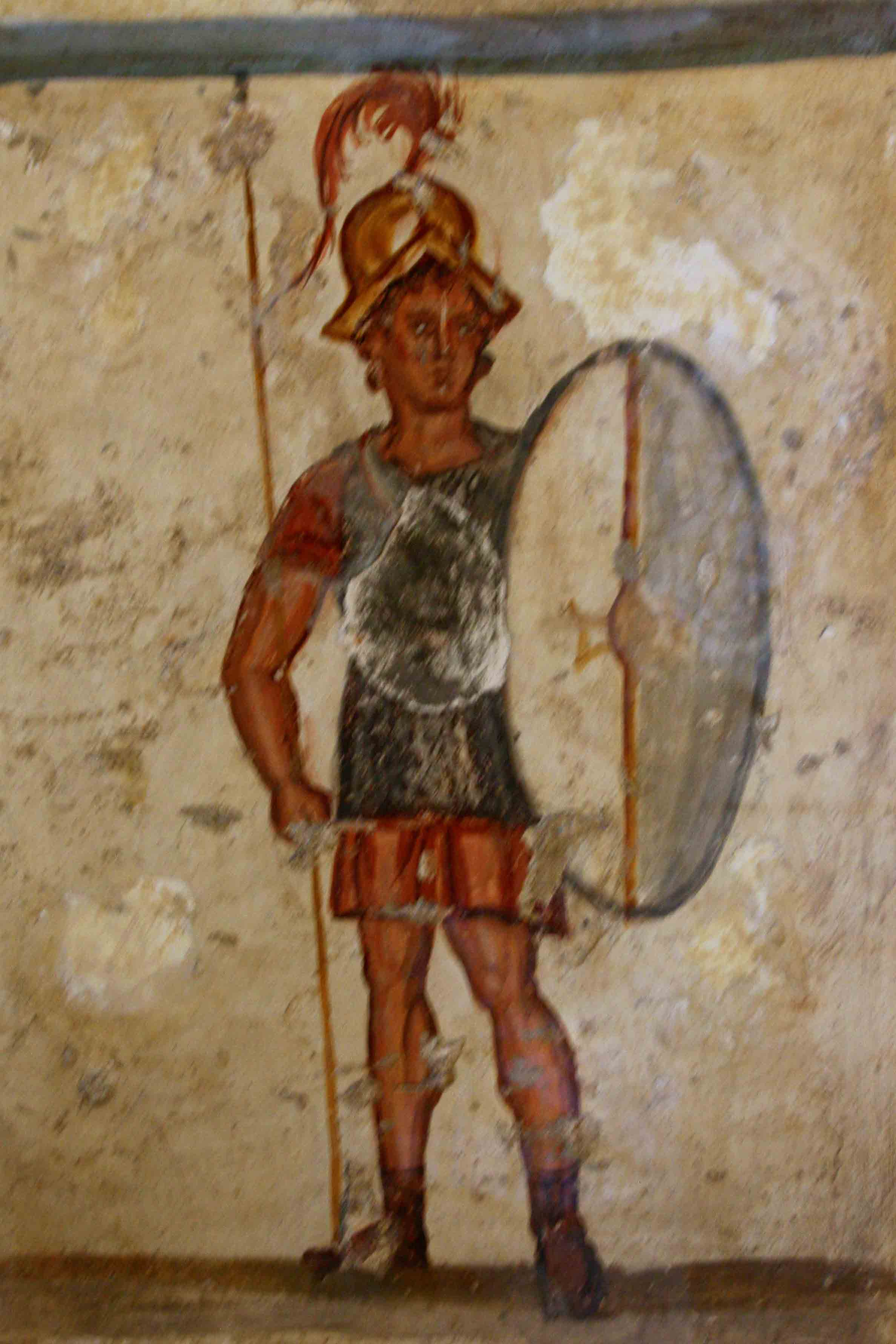
Fresco of an ancient Macedonian soldier (thorakitai) wearing chainmail armor and bearing a thureos shield

Aetolians were known more for their mobile light infantry forces like peltasts and other skirmisher units rather than their hoplites. From the 270s onwards, much like the rest of Greece, the emergence of the shield known as the thyreos was incorporated into Aetolian warfare and a new type of troop was developed. The thyreophoroi were a mixture of evolved peltasts and light hoplites, carrying the thureos shield, a thrusting spear and javelins.Thyreophoroi were distinguished from both skirmishers and the phalanx and seem to have operated in a role intermediate between the two types. They often supported light troops and seemed to be capable of operating in a similar manner to peltasts. They were mobile and could rapidly advance over varied terrain. According to Plutarch, they could fight as skirmishers and then fall back, assume spears and tighten the ranks, forming a phalanx. At the Battle of Panium in 200 BC, the supreme command of the Ptolemaic forces was held by the mercenary general Scopas of Aetolia, who brought with him 6,500 Aetolian mercenaries; 6,000 infantry and 500 cavalry.

The Aetolian League became well known for its cavalry by the end of the 3rd century, even though, the cavalry remained only a small proportion of its total military force; 400 cavalry accompanied 3,000 foot on a campaign in 218 BC. All we know of specific organisation is a reference to oulamoi, small squadrons of uncertain strength. At the start of the Battle of Cynoscephalae (197 BC) the Romans were forced into a retreat off the summit by the Macedonians, but they were not completely pushed off the hills due to the intervantion of the Aetolian cavalry. At this battle Flamininus had about 26,000 men, consisting of two full legions with the support of 6,000 infantry and 400 cavalry from the Aetolian League.

=== Reputation for piracy and brigandage ===
The Aetolian League acquired a reputation for piracy and brigandage. Though some historians recognize a pro-Achaean bias in the portrayal of the League by Polybius, many modern historians also accept his portrayal as largely justified. For example, Walbank is explicit in seeing the Aetolians as systematically using piracy to supplement their income due to the meager resources of their region and Will simply assumes the truth of the charge. By contrast, Grainger devotes a whole chapter to examining Aetolian involvement in piracy along with the charges that the Aetolians were temple robbers. He finds it hard to credit that Aetolia was involved in piracy given that Aetolia lacked a fleet of even the basic sort. Further by contrast with more general historians, those that have made specific studies of piracy and brigandage barely mention Aetolia. He lists the times that the Aetolians were accused of temple robbery and argues that the weight of these accusations should take into account that these are usually made by political opponents of the League and refer to occasions that were already some way in the past when the accusations were made.

In 205–204 BC, Dicaearchus, an Aetolian commander and pirate, was employed by Philip V of Macedon to raid the Cyclades and Rhodian ships.

== Major wars and battles ==
- Aetolian campaign
- Battle of Thermopylae (323 BC)
- Siege of Lamia
- Battle of Crannon
- Epirote-Macedonian War of 289 BC
- Fifth Sacred War (281–280 BC)
- Battle of Thermopylae (279 BC)
- Battle of Delphi
- Battle of Paxos
- Social War (220–217 BC)
- Lyttian War
- First Battle of Lamia
- Second Battle of Lamia
- Cretan War (205–200 BC)
- Battle of Cynoscephalae
- Battle of Thermopylae (191 BC)

== Aetolian generals ==
- Eurydamos
- Polyarchos
- Polyphron
- Lakrates
- Agelaus of Naupactus
- Pyrrhias of Aetolia
- Scopas of Aetolia
- Theodotus of Aetolia
- Nicolaus of Aetolia
- Ariston (strategos)
- Dorimachus
- Alexamenus of Aetolia
- Archedemus of Aetolia
- Lyciscus of Aetolia

== See also ==
- Demosthenes (general)
- Sicilian expedition
- Epirote League
- Macedonian league

== Sources ==
- John D. Grainger (1999) The League of the Aitolians (Google Books).
- C. Michael Hogan, Cydonia, Modern Antiquarian, January 23, 2008
- Krzysztof Kęciek (2002) "Kynoskefalaj 197 p.n.e" Serie Historic Battles Published in Warsaw by Bellona.
- Joseph B. Scholten (2000) The Politics of Plunder: Aitolians and Their Koinon in the Early Hellenistic Era (Google Books).
- Willis Mason West (1902) Ancient History to the Death of Charlemagne, Allyn and Bacon.
- Astin, AE; et al., eds. (1989). Rome and the Mediterranean to 133 BC. Cambridge Ancient History. Vol. 8 (2nd ed.). Cambridge University Press. ISBN 0-521-23448-4. OCLC 916019669.
  - Errington, R M. "Rome and Philip and Antiochus". In CAH^{2} 8 (1989), pp. 244–89.
  - Habicht, C. "The Seleucids and their rivals". In CAH^{2} 8 (1989), pp. 324–87.
- Badian, Ernst (1959). "Rome and Antiochus the Great: a study in cold war". Classical Philology. 54 (2): 81–99. doi:10.1086/364346. ISSN 0009-837X. JSTOR 266322.
- Bar-Kochva, Bezalel (1976). The Seleucid army: organization and tactics in the great campaigns. Cambridge University Press. ISBN 978-0-521-20667-9.
- Broughton, Thomas Robert Shannon (1951). The magistrates of the Roman republic. Vol. 1. New York: American Philological Association. ISBN 978-0891307068.
- Eckstein, Arthur (1995). "Glabrio and the Aetolians: a note on deditio". Transactions of the American Philological Association. 125: 271–289. doi:10.2307/284356. ISSN 0360-5949. JSTOR 284356.
- Grainger, John D. (2002). The Roman war of Antiochos the Great. Brill. ISBN 978-90-04-12840-8.
- Green, Peter (1990). Alexander to Actium: the historical evolution of the Hellenistic age. Berkeley: University of California Press. ISBN 0-520-05611-6. OCLC 13332042.
- Gruen, Erich Stephen (1986). The Hellenistic world and the coming of Rome. Berkeley: University of California Press. ISBN 0-520-05737-6. OCLC 16573469.
- Paltiel, Eliezer (1979). "The treaty of Apamea and the later Seleucids". Antichthon. 13: 30–41. doi:10.1017/S006647740000263X. ISSN 0066-4774.
- Sarikakis, Theodoros (1974). "Το Βασίλειο των Σελευκιδών και η Ρώμη" [The Seleucid kingdom and Rome]. In Christopoulos, Georgios A. & Bastias, Ioannis K. (eds.). Ιστορία του Ελληνικού Έθνους [History of the Greek Nation] (in Greek). Vol. Ε: Ελληνιστικοί Χρόνοι [Hellenistic Period]. Athens: Ekdotiki Athinon. pp. 55–91. ISBN 978-960-213-101-5.
- Sherwin-White, Adrian Nicolas (1984). Roman foreign policy in the East, 168 BC to AD 1. London: Duckworth. ISBN 0-7156-1682-X. OCLC 10664923.
- Taylor, Michael (2013). Antiochus The Great. Barnsley: Pen and Sword Military. ISBN 9781848844636.
- Tsimpoukidis, Dimitrios [in Russian] (1989). Ιστορία του ελληνιστικού κόσμου [History of the hellenistic world] (in Greek). Athens: Dimitrios N. Papadimas. ISBN 9789602060766.
- Waterfield, Robin (2014). Taken at the Flood: The Roman Conquest of Greece. Oxford: Oxford University Press. ISBN 9780199916894.

=== Ancient literature ===
- Livy (1905) [1st century AD]. From the Founding of the City . Translated by Roberts, Canon – via Wikisource.
- Polybius (1922–27) [2nd century BC]. Histories. Loeb Classical Library. Translated by Paton, W R. Cambridge: Harvard University Press – via LacusCurtius.
