= Machatas of Aetolia =

Ambassador of the Aetolian League

Machatas of Aetolia was sent as ambassador of the Aetolian League to Sparta at the commencement of the Social War (220–217 BC), to endeavour to induce the Lacedaemonians to join the Aetolians against Philip V of Macedon and the Achaean League. His first embassy was unsuccessful; but shortly after, a change having occurred in the government of Sparta, in consequence of the election of the two kings Agesipolis III and Lykourgos, Machatas returned, and this time easily effected the conclusion of the proposed alliance. From there he proceeded to Elis, and induced the Eleans also to unite with the newly formed league against the Achaean League.
