= Second Battle of Lamia =

Battle of the First Macedonian War

- Part of First Macedonian War
- Second Battle of Lamia (Greece)
| Date | 209 BC |
| Location | Lamia, Greece 34°54′N 22°26′E |
| Result | Macedonian victory |

Belligerents
| Macedonia | Aetolian League; Roman Republic; Pergamum |

Commanders and leaders
| Philip V of Macedon | Pyrrhias |

Strength
| Unknown | Unknown |

Casualties and losses
| Unknown | Heavy |

The Second Battle of Lamia was fought in 209 BC between the forces of Philip V of Macedon and Pyrrhias, a general of the Aetolian League. Pyrrhias was once again aided by Pergamene forces and Roman advisors but again he was defeated. His side suffered heavy casualties.

== Background ==
In the spring of 210 BC, Laevinus again sailed from Corcyra with his fleet, and with the Aetolians, captured Phocian Anticyra. Rome enslaved the inhabitants and Aetolia took possession of the town.

Although there was some fear of Rome and concern with her methods, the coalition arrayed against Philip continued to grow. As allowed for by the treaty, Pergamon, Elis and Messenia, followed by Sparta, all agreed to join the alliance against Macedon. The Roman fleet, together with the Pergamene fleet, controlled the sea, and Macedon and her allies were threatened on land by the rest of the coalition. The Roman strategy of encumbering Philip with a war among Greeks in Greece was succeeding, so much so that when Laevinus went to Rome to take up his consulship, he was able to report that the legion deployed against Philip could be safely withdrawn.

However, the Eleans, Messenians and Spartans remained passive throughout 210 BC, and Philip continued to make advances. He invested and took Echinus, using extensive siege works, having beaten back an attempt to relieve the town by the Aetolian strategos Dorimachus and the Roman fleet, now commanded by the proconsul Publius Sulpicius Galba. Moving west Philip probably also took Phalara the port city of Lamia, in the Maliac Gulf. Sulpicius and Dorimachus took Aegina, an island in the Saronic Gulf, which the Aetolians sold to Attalus, the Pergamene king, for thirty talents, and which he was to use as his base of operations against Macedon in the Aegean Sea.

In the spring of 209 BC, Philip received requests for help from his ally the Achaean League in the Peloponnesus who were being attacked by Sparta and the Aetolians. He also heard that Attalus had been elected one of the two supreme commanders of the Aetolian League, and rumours that he intended to crossover the Aegean from Asia Minor. It was due to this that King Philip decided to march south into Greece. In the First Battle of Lamia the Aetolian league suffered almost 1,000 casualties.

== Bibliography ==
- Livy, From the Founding of the City, Rev. Canon Roberts (translator), Ernest Rhys (Ed.); (1905) London: J. M. Dent & Sons, Ltd.
- Polybius, Histories, Evelyn S. Shuckburgh (translator); London, New York. Macmillan (1889); Reprint Bloomington (1962).
