= Makrinou =

Makrinou Μακρινού
- Community
- Location within Greece
- Coordinates: 38°28′N 21°37′E
- Country: Greece
- Administrative region: West Greece
- Regional unit: Aetolia-Acarnania
- Municipality: Agrinio
- Municipal unit: Makryneia

Population (2021)
  - Community: 255
- Time zone: UTC+2 (EET)
  - Summer (DST): UTC+3 (EEST)

Makrinou (Greek: Μακρινού) is a village and a community in the municipal unit of Makryneia, Aetolia-Acarnania, Greece. The community includes the villages Agia Triada, Agioi Apostoloi, Kypseli and Metaxas. It is located on a mountainside southeast of Lake Trichonida. Makrinou is 2 km southwest of Kato Makrinou, 10 km southeast of Gavalou, and 21 km northwest of Naupactus.

== Population ==
Year	Village population	Community population
1981	-	425
1991	201	-
2001	214	446
2011	131	307
2021	130	255
