= Scopas of Aetolia =

Aetolian general

Scopas (Greek: Σκόπας) was an Aetolian general, who served both his native Aetolian League in the Social War (220–217 BC) and Ptolemaic Egypt against the Seleucids, with mixed success. He was executed in 196 BC at Alexandria for conspiring to seize the power of the realm for himself.

== Service in the Social War ==
At the period of the outbreak of the Social War (220–217 BC), Scopas held a leading position among his countrymen. He was a kinsman of Ariston, who at this time held the office of strategos in the Aetolian League, and the latter confided to him the chief conduct of affairs. On this account it was to Scopas that Dorimachus applied for assistance after the ill success of his expedition against Messenia, and although no pretext had been given for involving the Aetolians in war, these two generals (Scopas and Dorimachus) were bold enough to undertake the enterprise on their own account.

In the spring of 220 BC Scopas and Dorimachus formed an expedition against the Messenians, and not only ravaged the territories of the latter, but when Aratus at the head of the Achaean army came to the Messenians support, the forces of Scopas and Dorimachus defeated Aratus and his forces at Caphyae. The forces of Scopas and Dormimachus then returned home. This action led to a public declaration of war by the Achaean League and their ally Philip V of Macedon against the Aetolians. The Aetolians chose Scopas for their strategos during the ensuing year, and entrusted to Scopas the conduct of the war which he had himself brought upon them. In the spring of 219 Scopas invaded Macedonia with a large force, laid waste the open country of Pieria without opposition, and having made himself master of Dion, not only destroyed the town, but plundered and burnt the celebrated temple which gave its name to the city. Meanwhile, however, Scopas neglected the defense of Aetolia itself, leaving it open to Philip to obtain important advantages on the side of the Acarnanians. The next year (218 BC) Scopas was sent by Dorimachus (who had succeeded Scopas as strategos) with a mercenary force to the assistance of the Eleans, but we have no further account of his operations in that year, or for the remainder of the Social War. Scopas name does not again occur in records until the year 211 BC, when Scopas again held the office of general, and in that capacity presiding in the assembly of the Aetolians, which concluded the alliance with the Roman praetor, Marcus Valerius Laevinus. The conquest of Acarnania was the bait held out to allure the Aetolians into this league, and Scopas immediately assembled his forces for the invasion of that country. But the determined resistance of the Acarnanians themselves, and the advance of Philip to their relief, rendered Scopas' efforts null. The next year (210 BC) Scopas was co-operating with Laevinus in the siege of Anticyra in Phocis. After its capture, the city was given up to the Aetolians.

== Service in Egypt ==
After the end of the war with Philip, we are told that the Aetolians were distracted with civil dissensions, and in order to appease these disorders and so as to provide some remedy against the burden of debts with which the chief persons in the country were oppressed, Scopas and Dorimachus were appointed to reform the constitution, in 204 BC. They were certainly not well qualified for legislators, and Scopas had only undertaken the charge from motives of personal ambition; on finding himself disappointed, he withdrew to Alexandria. Here he was received with the utmost favour by the ministers who ruled during the minority of the young Ptolemy V Epiphanes, and appointed to the chief command of the army in Coele-Syria, where he had to make head against the ambitious designs of Antiochus the Great. At first he was completely successful, and reduced the whole province of Judaea into subjection to Ptolemy, but was afterwards defeated by Antiochus at the Battle of Panium. Shutting himself up within the walls of Sidon, after an ineffectual attempt by Ptolemy to relieve him he was ultimately compelled by famine to surrender.

Notwithstanding this ill success he appears to have continued in high favour at the Ptolemaic court, and in 200 BC he was sent to Greece with a large sum of money to raise a mercenary force for the service of Ptolemy, a task which he performed so successfully as to carry back with him to Alexandria a body of above 6,000 of the flower of the Aetolian youth. His confidence in the support of so large a force, united to his own abilities, and the vast wealth which he had accumulated in the service of the Egyptian king, appears to have inflamed his ambition, and led him to conceive the design of seizing by force the chief administration of the kingdom. But his projects were discovered before they were ripe for execution, and a force was sent by Aristomenes, the chief minister of Ptolemy, to arrest him. Scopas was taken by surprise, and unable to offer any resistance. He was at once led before the council of the young king, condemned to death, and executed in prison the next night, in 196 BC. According to Polybius he had well deserved his fate by the reckless and insatiable rapacity which he had displayed during the whole period of his residence in Egypt.
