= Kallion =

Kallion may refer to:

- Ivar Kallion (1931–2013), Estonian Communist politician and author
- Callium, a town of ancient Greece
