= Archedemus of Aetolia =

Aetolian general

Archedemus or Archedamus (Ancient Greek: Άρχέδημος or Άρχέδαμος -- he's called "Archidamus" by Livy) was an Aetolian who commanded the Aetolian troops which assisted the Romans in the Second Macedonian War against Philip V of Macedon.

In 199 BCE he compelled Philip to raise the siege of the town of Thaumaci, and took an active part in the Battle of Cynoscephalae in 197, in which Philip was defeated.

When the war broke out between the Romans and the Aetolians, he was sent as ambassador to the Achaeans to solicit their assistance in 192; and on the defeat of Antiochus III the Great in the following year, he went as ambassador to the consul Manius Acilius Glabrio to sue for peace.

In 169, he was denounced to the Romans by Lyciscus as one of their enemies. He joined Perseus of Macedon the same year. In 169 BC, during the Third Macedonian War, Perseus was invited by the Epirots to attack Aetolia and marched on Stratus, the strongest Aetolian city, with 10,000 infantry and 300 cavalry. He could not pitch camp on the snow-covered Mount Citium and had to encamp elsewhere. He then was held up at the River Aracthus because of its deep water. He built a bridge, crossed, and then met Archidamus who had persuaded the nobles to betray Stratus. However, while he was away, the pro-Roman faction called in a Roman garrison. Dinarchus, the commander of the Aetolian cavalry, also arrived with 600 infantry and 100 cavalry to support Perseus, but when he saw the changed situation he switched allegiance to Rome. Due to the winter weather, Perseus abandoned Stratus, and went to Aperantia, which, through the influence of Archidamus, willingly surrendered. Archidamus was made its governor, while Perseus returned to Macedon. He accompanied the Macedonian king in his flight after his defeat in 168 BC.
