= Gavalou =

Gavalou Γαβαλού
- Community
- Location within Greece
- Coordinates: 38°31′N 21°31′E
- Country: Greece
- Administrative region: West Greece
- Regional unit: Aetolia-Acarnania
- Municipality: Agrinio
- Municipal unit: Makryneia

Population (2021)
  - Community: 944
- Time zone: UTC+2 (EET)
  - Summer (DST): UTC+3 (EEST)

Gavalou (Greek: Γαβαλού) is a town and a community in the municipal unit of Makryneia, Aetolia-Acarnania, Greece. The community includes the small village Kourtelaiika. The town is located south of Lake Trichonida, the largest natural lake of Greece. It is 7 km east of Papadates, 10 km northwest of Kato Makrinou and 15 km southeast of Agrinio.

== Population ==
Year	Town population	Community population
1981	1,407	-
1991	1,383	-
2001	1,386	1,484
2011	1,018	1,051
2021	922	944

== History ==
Gavalou may be built at or near the site of the ancient Aetolian town Trichonium, from which the Lake Trichonida derived its name. Its position is uncertain. Leake places it S. of the lake at a place called Gavala, and Kiepert, in his map E. of the lake. But since Strabo mentions it along with Stratus as situated in a fertile plain, it ought probably to be placed N. of the lake (Strab. x. p. 450; Pol. v. 7; Steph. B. s. v.). It was evidently a place of importance, and several natives of this town are mentioned in history. (Pol. iv. 3, v. 13, xvii. 10; Paus. ii. 37. § 3; Leake, Northern Greece, vol. i. p. 155.)

The Old Aetolia was the seacoast extending from the Achelous to Calydon, reaching for a considerable distance into the interior, which is fertile and level; here in the interior lie Stratus and Trichonium, the latter having excellent soil. A prominent figure was Alexander of Trichonium in Aetolia and he was commander of the Aetolians in 218 and 219 BC. He attacked the rear of the army of Philip on his return from Thermus, but the attempt was unsuccessful, and many Aetolians fell. (Polyb. v. 13)

== Climate ==
Gavalou has a Mediterranean climate with relatively mild winters and particularly hot summers. Gavalou records among the highest average summer maximum temperatures in the country. Like most of Western Greece it receives a lot of rainfall during the winter and autumn with an average annual precipitation of more than 1.100 mm.

In July 2024 Gavalou recorded 14 consecutive days with temperatures over 40 °C (104 °F).

Climate data for Gavalou (2008–2025)
Month	Jan	Feb	Mar	Apr	May	Jun	Jul	Aug	Sep	Oct	Nov	Dec	Year
Record high °C (°F)	23.2 (73.8)	24.8 (76.6)	28.2 (82.8)	33.2 (91.8)	38.5 (101.3)	41.6 (106.9)	43.4 (110.1)	43.2 (109.8)	38.7 (101.7)	36.2 (97.2)	30.0 (86.0)	23.9 (75.0)	43.4 (110.1)
Mean daily maximum °C (°F)	13.7 (56.7)	15.3 (59.5)	18.2 (64.8)	22.7 (72.9)	27.2 (81.0)	32.5 (90.5)	36.0 (96.8)	36.0 (96.8)	30.3 (86.5)	24.3 (75.7)	19.2 (66.6)	14.9 (58.8)	24.2 (75.6)
Daily mean °C (°F)	9.6 (49.3)	10.8 (51.4)	12.8 (55.0)	16.5 (61.7)	20.6 (69.1)	25.4 (77.7)	28.6 (83.5)	28.5 (83.3)	24.2 (75.6)	19.1 (66.4)	14.9 (58.8)	10.9 (51.6)	18.5 (65.3)
Mean daily minimum °C (°F)	5.6 (42.1)	6.2 (43.2)	7.3 (45.1)	10.3 (50.5)	14.0 (57.2)	18.3 (64.9)	21.1 (70.0)	21.1 (70.0)	18.0 (64.4)	13.9 (57.0)	10.5 (50.9)	7.0 (44.6)	12.8 (55.0)
Record low °C (°F)	−3.6 (25.5)	−1.9 (28.6)	−1.0 (30.2)	3.4 (38.1)	8.5 (47.3)	12.0 (53.6)	15.7 (60.3)	16.8 (62.2)	11.8 (53.2)	5.4 (41.7)	3.1 (37.6)	−1.7 (28.9)	−3.6 (25.5)
Average rainfall mm (inches)	187.9 (7.40)	121.4 (4.78)	107.4 (4.23)	54.6 (2.15)	43.5 (1.71)	44.4 (1.75)	8.6 (0.34)	27.8 (1.09)	65.5 (2.58)	118.9 (4.68)	160.5 (6.32)	166.2 (6.54)	1,106.7 (43.57)
Source: National Observatory of Athens (Sep 2008 - Aug 2025), Gavalou N.O.A station,World Meteorological Organization
