= Ariston (strategos) =

3rd-century BC Greek politician

Ariston of Trichonion was a strategos of the Aetolians in 221 BC, who, labouring under some bodily defect, left the command of the troops to Scopas and Dorimachus, while he himself remained at home. Notwithstanding the declarations of the Achaeans to regard every one as an enemy who should trespass upon the territories of Messenia or Achaia, the Aetolian commanders invaded Peleponnesus, and Ariston was stupid enough, in the face of this fact, to assert that the Aetolians and Achaeans were at peace with each other.
