= Social War (220–217 BC) =

Ancient Greek war from 220 to 217 BC

- Greece after the Cleomenean War
Date	220–217 BC
Location	Peloponnese and central Greece
Result	Macedonian and Achaean victory
Territorial changes	Triphylia and Phthiotis to Macedon, Psophis and Lasion to Achaea

Belligerents
Macedonia, Achaean League, Acarnania, Boeotia, Epirus, Messene	Aetolian League, Elis, Sparta

Commanders and leaders
Philip V of Macedon, Aratus of Sicyon	Ariston of Trichonion, Scopas of Trichonion, Dorimachus of Trichonion, Lycurgus of Sparta

The Social War, also War of the Allies and the Aetolian War, was fought from 220 BC to 217 BC between the Hellenic League under Philip V of Macedon and the Aetolian League, Sparta and Elis. It was ended with the Peace of Naupactus.

== Background ==
Many of the tensions which led to the war were later documented by the Greek historian Polybius.

The First Illyrian War, in 228, left the Aetolian League greater in size than ever before, and worked to continue expanding in all directions. Its attempt to expand into Thessaly, where Macedon had recently collapsed, resulted in a violent reaction from Macedon, the first in almost four decades. That created an unceasing suspicion between the two for years to come.

During the Cleomenean War in the mid 220s, a new alliance had emerged among Macedon, the Achaean League, the Epirote League, the Boeotian League and Acarnania, which became known as the Hellenic League, or Symmachy. The first hegemon of the Symmachy was Antigonus Doson, the guardian and king of Macedon from 229 to 221 BC. At his death in 221 he was followed by his adoptive son, 17-year-old Philip V, who was tutored by the Royal Council (led by Apelles of Chalcis) and the Achaean leader Aratus of Sicyon.

As the only power standing in the way of complete Macedonian control of Greece, the Aetolians felt threatened by the expansion of the Symmachy. Being almost completely encircled by its members, it began taking defensive measures. In that situation, the inexperienced new king in Pella was seen as a last opportunity by the leading Aetolians. Spurned by his young nephews Scopas and Dorimachus, the strategos Ariston of Trichonion thus tried to prevent the further decay of Aetolia’s international position, and together, the three Trichonians imposed a radical change to Aetolian policy.

=== Aetolian Raids ===
In the spring of 220 BC, after Sparta had temporarily joined the Symmachy, the Aetolians were most worried about Messenia, their last ally in the Peloponnese. To prevent the Messenians from changing sides as well, Ariston sent an expeditionary force under Scopas and Dorimachus to the city of Phigaleia, in Triphylia on the Messenian border. On the way, these troops pillaged the countryside of several Achaean cities, namely Patras and Pharae, creating further hostility. From Phigaleia they entered Messenia, where they continued their looting. In reaction, the Messenians decided to abandon their former alliance with Aetolia and called on the Achaeans for help.

The Achaean strategos, Aratus, set his army in march and sent a protest note, ordering the Aetolians to retreat from Messenia. Scopas and Dorimachus at first appeared to obey but then invaded Arcadia, where they defeated the Achaean army in the Battle of Caphyae. Unable to fight the threat alone, Aratus informed the allies of the Hellenic League. Since he had received a formal request by the Messenians, he asked to favour their admission to the Symmachy. Meanwhile, the Aetolians continued their raiding activity by burning the Arcadian city of Cynaetha.

=== Declaration of war ===
Philip V of Macedon appeared reluctant at first, but after Aetolia allied with the Illyrians, he marched south to the Peloponnese, where he gathered the members of the Hellenic League in a council at Corinth. There, Aratus and other representatives of the various leagues listed complaints dealing with the Aetolians, most ranging over a period of many years. Thus, a decision was taken in the summer of 220 BC; after consulting their respective assemblies, the allies ratified their declaration of war on the Aetolian League.

Although acting as though he was responding to the complaints of the league members, Philip was very interested in war to establish himself as a victorious leader and to consolidate the power of Macedonia in Greece. That was exactly what the Aetolian policy since 222 had intended to avoid. However, although the war was decided unanimously by the members of the Hellenic League, the only party ready to engage, besides Philip and Achaea, was the Acarnanians. This lack of interest by the other members is attributed by Grainger to Aetolia's more peaceful policies in the previous decade.

As one of the first acts of war, Philip sent a force to Crete to intervene in the Lyttian War and to wrest the island from the Aetolians, which was quickly successful. He also won allegiance of the Illyrians and their fleet and then returned to Macedon for the winter. Meanwhile, however, news of the death of the Lacedaemonian king Cleomenes III in Egypt, triggered a political change in Sparta, which allowed the Aetolian envoy Machatas to win the newly-elected king Lycurgus over for an alliance with Aetolia.

== Campaigns of 219 BC ==
In the summer of 219 BC Sparta attacked Achaea from the south, Elis attacked from the west, and the Aetolians attacked from the north. Following a victory over the Achaean hypostrategos Miccus of Dyme, the Aetolian general Euripidas raided Western Arcadia. By the end of the summer, after a mutiny of their mercenaries, the Achaeans were near collapse. The Achaean cities of Dyme, Pharae and Tritaia even refused to pay the due taxes to the League and used the already collected sum to hire a mercenary force of their own.

In the meantime the Aetolian strategos Scopas marched through Thessaly to raid the sanctuary of Apollo at Dion in Pieria, on the Macedonian border, and his cousin Dorimachus did the same with the oracle of Zeus and Dione at Dodona in Epirus.

Philip V at first lost precious time with a siege on the Gulf of Ambracia, but then he engaged in a quick march down the coast through Western Aetolia. Starting from Epirus he conquered several cities, including Elaeus and Oeniadae, leading him to Calydon, where he received news of a pending invasion of Macedon by the Dardanians. He returned to his homeland, but the invasion never took place. Crossing the Gulf of Ambracia on his way back home, he received the Illyrian leader Demetrius of Pharos who had been driven from his kingdom by the Romans.

== Campaigns of 218 BC ==
At the turn of 219/18 BC Philip secretly took his army to Corinth and from there started a winter campaign in the Peloponnese. After chasing Euripidas from the pass of Apelaurus near Stymphalos, he marched through Arcadia and Elis to Triphylia, winning victory after victory. At first he stormed the city of Psophis and handed it over to his Achaean ally Aratus the Younger. The same procedure was used at Lasion, while the village of Stration was given to the citizens of Thelpusa.

From Olympia in Pisatis the king moved against Elis, where he captured the fortress of Thalamas and the Elean leader Amphidamus. Next he fought the Aetolians in Triphylia, took the city of Phigaleia from the hands of their inhabitants and conquered the entire province in a week. Finally he came to terms with the fortress of Samicum, where a combined force of 2,700 Aetolians, Eleans and Spartans including even some Illyrian pirates was only able to negotiate their release on parole.

In the summer of 218 BC, Philip and his allies took a fleet to the island of Cephalonia, but when the siege of Pale failed, the king decided on an attack against the Aetolian heartland. So he moved his army by ship to the Gulf of Ambracia and from there marched past the city of Stratos and the Trichonis-Lake to Thermon, devastating the temples and statues in the Pan-Aetolian sanctuary.

After a quick retreat westward, through the territory he had conquered the previous summer, the young king embarked again at Amphilochia.

From the Gulf of Ambracia Philip sailed back to Corinth and then quickly marched to Sparta, where he made many successful raids against the unfortified villages south of the city as far as the port of Gythium. When the Spartan king Lycurgus tried to block his path north, Philip and Demetrius of Pharos dislodged the Lacedaemonians from the Menelaion above the city, while Aratus led the main force to cross the Eurotas River.

On his return to Corinth, however, Philip had to deal with soldiers dissatisfied with the low yields of plunder. He then put down a conspiracy led by his tutor Apelles, the chancellor Megaleas and several officers. After a failed attempt at a peace conference, Philip returned home for the winter of 218/17 BC.

== Campaign of 217 BC ==
Following a disastrous year under the strategos Eperatus of Pharae, in 217 BC Aratus of Sicyon returned to the helm in the Achaean League. Due to his experience he managed to reorganize the defenses in order to fence off the Aetolian raids. While Aratus was away in Megalopolis, Euripidas, still the Aetolian general in Elis, tried to repeat his raids of the previous year. He advanced far into Achaean territory, pillaging even near the capital Aigion, but on the way back he was blocked near Leontion by the hypostrategos Lycus of Pharae. In the ensuing Battle of Leontion the Achaeans killed 400 raiders and took 200 prisoners, among them the former Olympic victor Evanoridas of Elis.

After this success Lycus called the Achaean hipparch Demodocus with the cavalry and together they entered the territory of Elis, where they killed 200 more and took 80 prisoners. At the same time Philip V took the city of Thebes in Phthiotic Achaea, rounding out his possessions in Thessaly. However, he was forced to leave in order to deal with dissatisfied Illyrians who wanted more spoils of war.

=== Peace of Naupactus ===
About this time, the king received news that the Romans had been defeated by Hannibal at the Battle of Lake Trasimene. Advised by Demetrius of Pharos, who hoped to regain possession of his former kingdom, the Macedonian king decided to end the war with Aetolia in order to focus his attentions on Rome. With a last bluff, Philip lured the exhausted Aetolians into peace talks, granting the principle that every side should maintain what it currently possessed. The conference was held in the city of Naupactus, from which the peace treaty took its name.

== Outcome ==
After the victory over Cleomenes of Sparta, the Social War was already the second success for the Hellenic League created by Antigonus Doson and Aratus of Sicyon.

The poor performance of the Achaean forces and the limited engagement of the minor allies, however, led to a significant shift in the internal balance of powers towards the Macedonian hegemon. Moreover the character of the young king changed for the worse during the conflict and the good relationship between Aratus and Philip was damaged beyond repair.

As a result of Philip's ability the Kingdom of Macedon became the major military power in Greece, but at the same time his growing ambition threatened to damage the cohesion of the Symmachy as intended by his stepfather and his former tutor.

== See also ==
- Agelaus of Naupactus – 3rd-century BC Greek official
- Machatas of Aetolia – Ambassador of the Aetolian League
- Aetolian War – War between Rome and the Seleucid Empire, 192–188 BC
