= Kato Makrinou =

Kato Makrinou Κάτω Μακρινού
- Community
- Location within Greece
- Coordinates: 38°29′N 21°37′E
- Country: Greece
- Administrative region: West Greece
- Regional unit: Aetolia-Acarnania
- Municipality: Agrinio
- Municipal unit: Makryneia

Population (2021)
  - Community: 401
- Time zone: UTC+2 (EET)
  - Summer (DST): UTC+3 (EEST)

Kato Makrinou (Greek: Κάτω Μακρινού meaning "Lower Makrinou") is a village in the municipal unit of Makryneia, Aetolia-Acarnania, Greece. It is located in a valley southeast of Lake Trichonida. It is 2 km northeast of Makrinou, 10 km southeast of Gavalou and 20 km northwest of Naupactus.

== Population ==
Year	Population
1981	887
1991	852
2001	659
2011	580
2021	401
