= Makryneia =

Makryneia Μακρυνεία
- Municipal unit
- Location within the regional unit

- Location within Greece
- Coordinates: 38°32′N 21°32′E
- Country: Greece
- Administrative region: West Greece
- Regional unit: Aetolia-Acarnania
- Municipality: Agrinio

Area
  - Municipal unit: 149.7 km^{2} (57.8 sq mi)

Population (2021)
  - Municipal unit: 2,988
  - Municipal unit density: 19.96/km^{2} (51.70/sq mi)
- Time zone: UTC+2 (EET)
  - Summer (DST): UTC+3 (EEST)
- Postal code: 300 15

Makryneia (Greek: Μακρυνεία) is a former municipality in Aetolia-Acarnania, West Greece, Greece. Since the 2011 local government reform it is part of the municipality Agrinio, of which it is a municipal unit. The municipal unit has an area of 149.687 km^{2}. The seat of the municipality was in Gavalou. The municipal unit is located south and southeast of Lake Trichonida, and northwest of the mountain Arakynthos. There are farmlands near the lake shore, and forests on the mountain slopes. Makryneia is southeast of Agrinio, northeast of Missolonghi and northwest of Naupactus.

== Subdivisions ==
The municipal unit Makryneia is subdivided into the following communities (constituent villages in brackets):

- Agios Andreas or Bourlesia (Agios Andreas, Ano Metapa)
- Akres or Lithovouni (Akres, Saranti, Varka)
- Dafnias (Dafnias, Palaiozefgaro)
- Gavalou (Gavalou, Kourtelaiika)
- Kato Makrinou
- Kapsorachi (Kapsorachi, Palaiochori)
- Makrinou (Makrinou, Agia Triada, Agioi Apostoloi, Kypseli, Metaxas)
- Mesarista (Mesarista, Kazanaiika, Paradeisi, Tsiligiannaika)
- Potamoula Trichonidas
- Trichonio

== Population ==
Year	Population
1991	5,282
2001	5,241
2011	3,681
2021	2,988
