= Battle of Panium =

Battle between Seleucid and Ptolemaic forces as part of the Fifth Syrian War

Coordinates: 33°14′55″N 35°41′40″E

- Part of the Fifth Syrian War
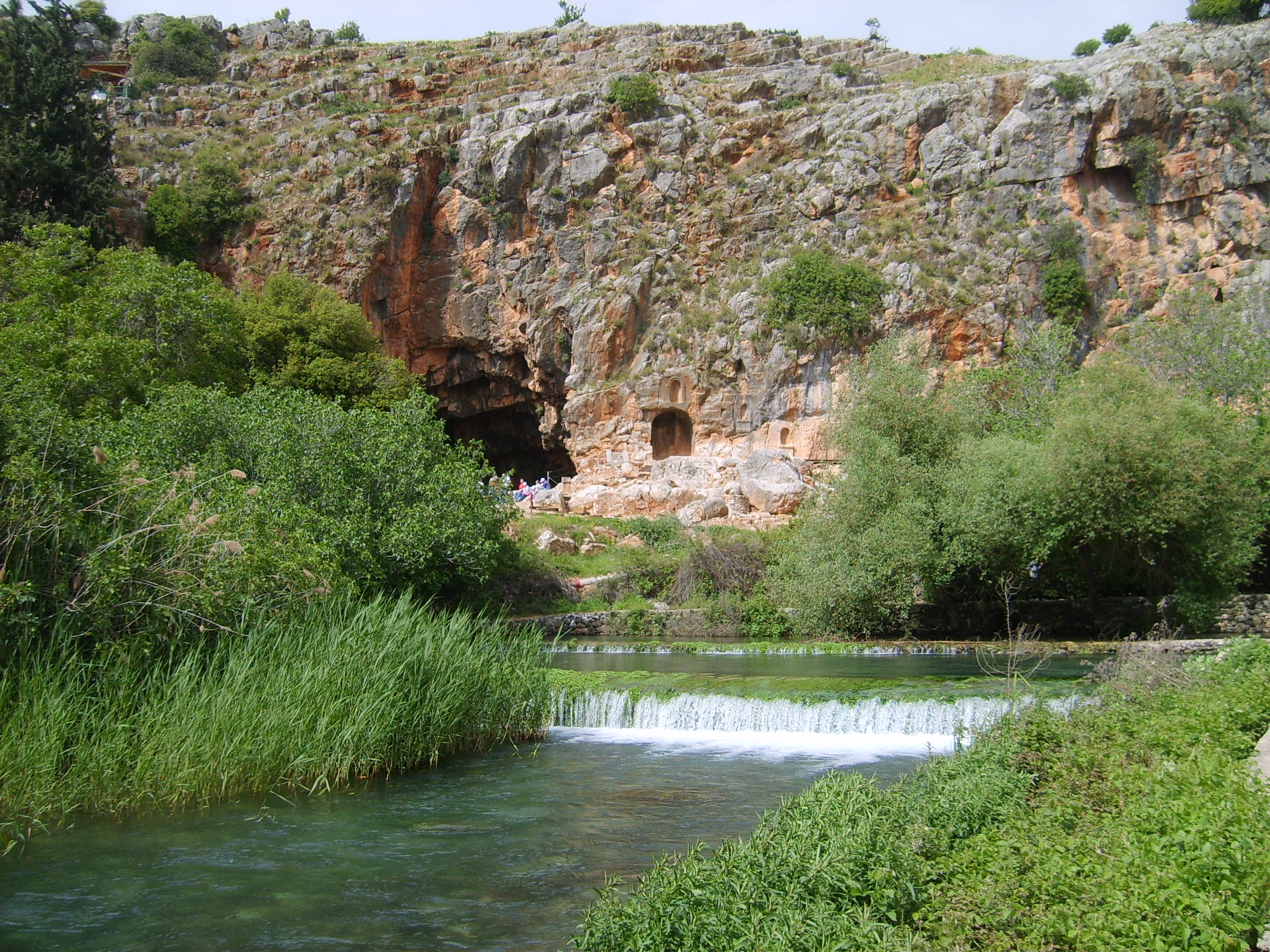
- The spring of Banias with the Cave of Pan in background
Date	Summer 200 BC
Location	Near Banias
Result	Seleucid victory
Territorial changes	Seleucid conquest of Coele-Syria

Belligerents
Seleucid Empire	Ptolemaic Egypt

Commanders and leaders
Antiochus III the Great; Antiochus the Younger	Scopas of Aetolia

Strength
70,000 men Unknown war elephants	46,500–53,000 men ----25,000–32,000 phalangites 6,000 Aetolian infantry 500 Aetolian cavalry 14,500–15,000 other troops

Casualties and losses
Unknown	17,500–20,825 phalangites killed or captured

The Battle of Panium /pəˈnaɪ.əm/ (also known as Paneion, Ancient Greek: Πάνειον, or Paneas, Πανειάς) was fought in 200 BC near Paneas (Caesarea Philippi) between Seleucid and Ptolemaic forces as part of the Fifth Syrian War. The Seleucids were led by Antiochus III the Great, while the Ptolemaic army was led by Scopas of Aetolia. The Seleucids achieved a complete victory, annihilating the Ptolemaic army and conquering the province of Coele-Syria. The Ptolemaic Kingdom never recovered from its defeat at Panium and ceased to be an independent great power. Antiochus secured his southern flank and began to concentrate on the looming conflict with the Roman Republic.

== Background ==
In 202 BC, Ptolemy son of Thraseas, the Ptolemaic governor of Coele-Syria, defected to the side of Antiochus III the Great, the ruler of the Seleucid Empire. Antiochus invaded and occupied most of the province, including the city of Gaza, by the autumn of 201 BC, when he returned to winter quarters in Syria. The Ptolemaic commander Scopas of Aetolia reconquered parts of the province that winter. Antiochus gathered his army at Damascus and in the summer of 200 BC, he confronted the Ptolemaic army at the stream of Panium near Mount Hermon.

== Prelude ==
=== Ptolemaic dispositions ===
The Ptolemaic front line was four kilometers wide. The left wing was deployed on the plain below the Panium plateau. It consisted of the 25,000–32,000 strong Macedonian settler phalanx under the command of Ptolemy son of Aeropus, a Macedonian settler himself. These were the Kingdom's best troops. The supreme command was held by the Aetolian mercenary general Scopas of Aetolia, who brought with him 6,500 Aetolian mercenaries; 6,000 infantry and 500 cavalry.

=== Seleucid dispositions ===
Antiochus probably had around 70,000 soldiers, more than the 68,000 he had at the Battle of Raphia in 217 BC. Having re-conquered the Upper Satrapies in the previous years, he could draw upon a larger resource base than before. Polybius identifies the presence of cataphracts, the elite cavalry agema, Tarentines and more cavalry, phalangites, hypaspists, war elephants, unidentified infantry and light skirmishers in the ranks of the Seleucid army at Panium.

== Battle ==
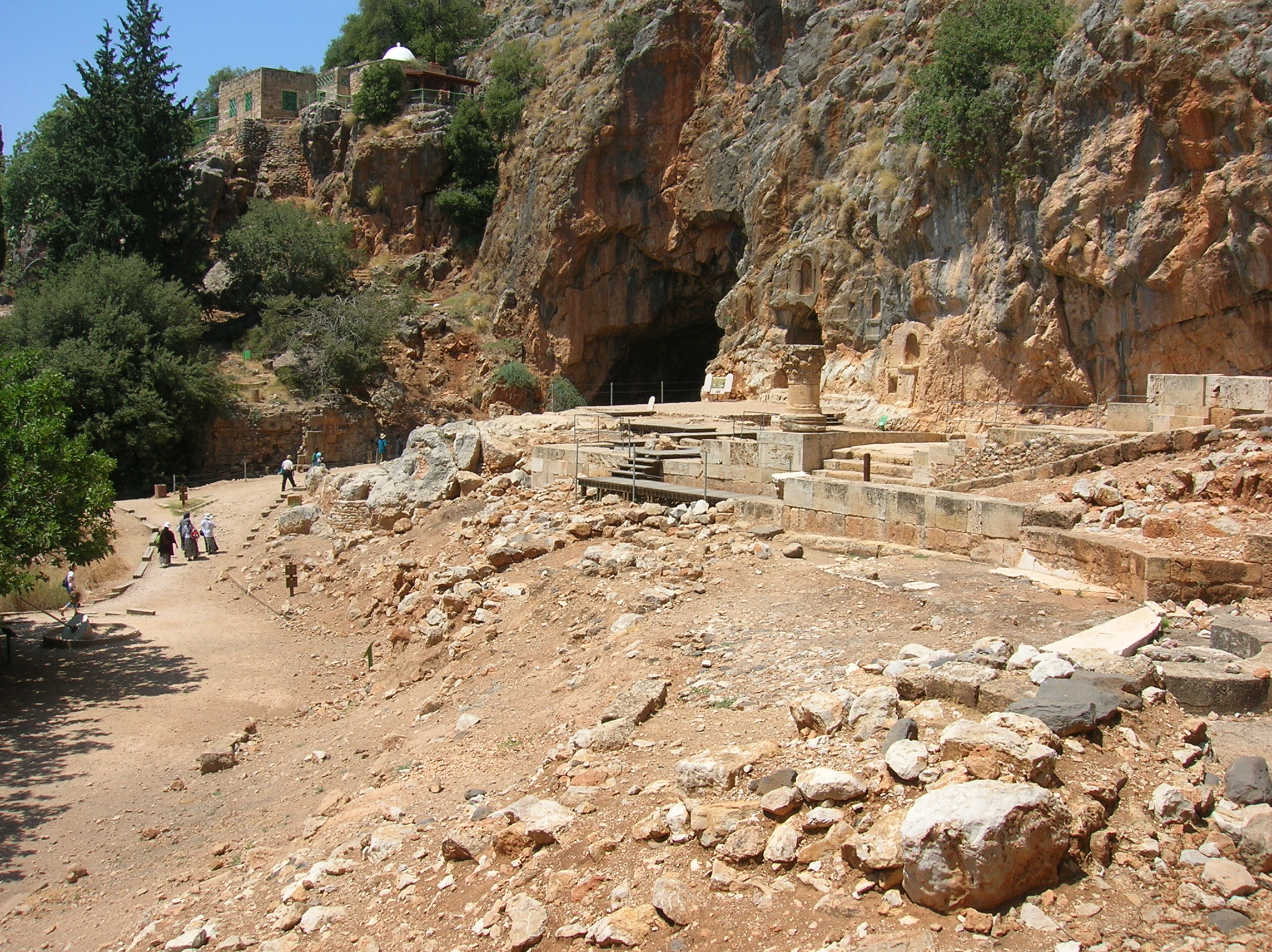
The entrance to the cave of Pan

Antiochus the Younger, the firstborn son of Antiochus III, commanded the elite cataphracts of the Seleucid army and seized Tel Hamra, a foothill of Mount Hermon, in the night. The cataphracts opened the battle by attacking and quickly routing the hapless Ptolemaic cavalry under Ptolemy.

In the center, the Ptolemaic phalanx forced back their Seleucid counterparts. The Seleucid elephants neutralized this Ptolemaic success by charging through the gaps in the Seleucid phalanx and halting their advance. The cataphracts under Antiochus the Younger ended their pursuit of the enemy cavalry and charged the rear of the Ptolemaic phalanx. Pressed from two sides by war elephants, phalangites, and cataphracts, the relatively immobile Ptolemaic phalanx was almost annihilated where they stood. Scopas, situated on the right wing, fled the field, taking 10,000 troops with him.

== Aftermath ==
Scopas led 10,000 men to seek refuge at Sidon; other Ptolemaic contingents fled to Jerusalem, Phoenicia, Samaria and Decapolis. All of them were forced to surrender by the end of 198 BC. Coele-Syria came under Seleucid control and the Ptolemies were compelled to sign a peace treaty with Antiochus in 195 BC. As one of the battle's results, the Ptolemaic state was forced to scale down the role of the Macedonian settler phalanx in the years that followed.

Some biblical commentators see this battle as being the one referred to in Daniel 11:15, where it says, "Then the king of the North will come and build up siege ramps and will capture a fortified city."

=== Casualties ===
Based on the loss rates of the phalanxes at the battles of Magnesia in 190 BC and Pydna in 167 BC, the 25,000 Ptolemaic phalangites may have sustained 17,500–20,825 losses, killed or captured.

== Bibliography ==
Belenkiy, Ari (2015). “The Encounter of Simon the Just and Antiochus the Great: from Zeno of Rhodes to Josephus Flavius and the Talmud.” Scientific Culture 1 (2), 1-21. https://sci-cult.com/the-encounter-of-simon-the-just-with-antiochus-the-great-from-zenon-of-rhodes-to-josephus-flavius-and-the-talmud/

Johstono, Paul (2017). ""No Strength To Stand": Defeat at Panium, the Macedonian Class, and Ptolemaic Decline". In Clark, Jessica H.; Turner, Brian (eds.). Brills Companion to Military Defeat in Ancient Mediterranean Society. Leiden: Brill Publishers. ISBN 978-9004298583.
