= Battle of Paxos =

Naval battle in 229 BCE

- Part of the Illyrian Wars
- Map of Corfu and Paxoi on the SE side.
Date	229 BC
Location	Off the island of Paxos
Result	Illyrian victory: Illyrians establish a garrison in Corcyra

Belligerents
Kingdom of Illyria; Supported by Acarnania	Corcyra; Achaean League; Aetolian League

Commanders and leaders
Teuta	Margos of Keryneia †

Strength
Illyrian fleet 7 Acarnanian ships	10 Achaean ships

The Battle of Paxos was a naval battle between a coalition of Illyrian federation with their Acarnanian allies, against the allies of Corcyra (modern Corfu), the Achaean League and Aetolian League. The battle took place in the spring of 229 BC and was a direct consequence to the siege of Corcyra by the forces of queen Teuta.

Polybius describes a cunning maritime stratagem mastered by the Illyrian fleet. The Illyrians took four triremes and sank a quinquereme, while the rest of the Greeks managed to escape. This resulted in the Illyrian forces establishing a garrison in Corcyra, under one of the queen's commanders.

== Illyrian offensive ==
In 231 BC, an Illyrian army, returning north from a raid in the Peloponnese, captured the Epirote city of Phoenice in a surprise attack. After a further defeat in battle, the leaders of the Epirote League lost heart and, although the Illyrian forces were soon recalled to deal with a rebellion in the north following the death of their king, the Epirotes resolved to come to terms with the Barbarians and accept the Ardiaean Kingdom as their new ally against their former protectors from Achaea and Aetolia.

Regent of the Illyrian kingdom became Teuta, the king's widow, who pursued a plan to raid more of the independent Greek colonies on the Adriatic coast; but while she besieged Issa in 230 BC, she made a fatal error when she killed an ambassador of the Roman Republic. This action led to the Illyro-Roman Wars.

== Siege of Corcyra ==
In the spring of 229 BC, queen Teuta fitted out a larger fleet of ships than her previous expeditions and dispatched them to the Greek coasts. Some of them sailed to Corcyra, while another party anchored in the harbour of Epidamnos, professedly to seek water and provision, but really with the design of surprising and seizing the city. After a failed attempt on the city, the Illyrian commanders hastened to get under way and, catching up with the rest of the flotilla, bore down on Corcyra.

The Illyrian army landed on the island and laid siege to the city. Upon this the Corcyreans, in the utmost distress and despondency, sent, together with the peoples of Apollonia and Epidamnos, envoys to the Achaeans and Aetolians, imploring them to hasten to their relief and not allow them to be driven from their home by the Illyrians. The two Leagues, after listening to the envoys, consented to their request, and both joined in manning the 10 decked ships belonging to the Achaeans. In a few days they were ready and sailed for Corcyra in a hope of raising the siege.

== Naval battle ==
The Illyrians, now reinforced by seven decked ships sent by the Acarnanians in compliance with the terms of their treaty, encountered the Achaean fleet off the island of Paxos. The Acarnanians and those Achaean ships which were told off to engage them fought with no advantage on either side, remaining undamaged in their encounter except for wounds inflicted on some of the crew.

The Illyrians lashed their ships in batches of four and thus engaged the enemy. They sacrificed their own ships, presenting them broadside to their adversaries in a position favouring their charge, but when the enemy's ships had charged and struck them and getting fixed in them found themselves in difficulty. In each case the four ships lashed together were hanging on their beaks, while the Illyrians leapt on the decks of the Achaean ships and overtook them by their numbers. In this way they captured four quadriremes and sunk with all hands a quinquereme, on board of which was Margos of Keryneia.

== Capitulation of Corcyra ==
Highly elated by their success, the Illyrians continued the siege of Corcyra with more security and confidence. The Corcyreans, whose hopes were crushed by the repulse of their allies and after enduring the siege for a short time longer, came to terms with the Illyrians. As a result, Corcyra received a garrison under the command of Demetrius of Pharos. After this the Illyrian commanders sailed off immediately and coming to anchor at Epidamnos, set yet another siege to city.

== Aftermath ==
After these developments the alliance between the Achaeans and the Aetolians collapsed. Some historians claim that this was due to the battle of Paxos, but others believe that it was a result of events that occurred in the Peloponnesus. Holding Corcyra, the Illyrians were now in a key position that allowed to intercept the entire trade on the sea routes between Greece, Italy and Sicily, which made a reaction by the major powers inevitable. The Romans were already preparing their first intervention on the opposite coast of the Adriatic, and soon after the previous events their fleet was able to take possession of Corcyra. Decisive help to this purpose was not only offered by the Corcyreans themselves, but also by the Illyrian governor Demetrius, who betrayed his own garrison into the hands of the Romans. The armies of the consuls then went on to conquer Apollonia and relieve Epidamnos (soon renamed Dyrrhachium), thus establishing the first Roman foothold on the Illyrian mainland.

== Sources ==
- Gruen, Erich S. (1986). The Hellenistic World and the Coming of Rome, Volume 1. Berkeley and Los Angeles, California: University of California Press. ISBN 0-520-05737-6.
- Mackil, Emily (2012). Creating a common polity religion, economy, and politics in the making of the Greek koinon. Berkeley: University of California Press. ISBN 9780520953932.
- Ormerod, Henry Arderne (1997). Piracy in the Ancient World: An Essay in Mediterranean History. Baltimore, Maryland: Johns Hopkins University Press. ISBN 0-8018-5505-5.
- Scholten, Joseph B. (2000). The Politics of Plunder: Aitolians and Their Koinon in the Early Hellenistic Era, 279-217 B.C. University of California Press. ISBN 9780520916746.
- Wilkes, John (1995). The Illyrians. Oxford, United Kingdom: Blackwell Publishers Limited. ISBN 0-631-19807-5.
