= Agrinium =

Ancient town in Aetolia, Greece

Coordinates: 38°37′20″N 21°24′23″E

Agrinium or Agrinion (Ancient Greek: Ἀγρίνιον) was a town of ancient Aetolia, situated towards the northwest of Aetolia, near the Achelous River. Its name suggested that it was a town of the Agraei; but the narrative in Polybius would imply that it was not so far north. In 314 BCE, Agrinium was allied with the Acarnanians when Cassander marched to the assistance of the latter against the Aetolians. As soon as Cassander returned to Macedonia, Agrinium was besieged by the Aetolians and surrendered. Many of the inhabitants of Agrinium were executed by the Aetolians.

Its site is located near the modern Agrinio (formerly Vrachori), renamed to reflect association with the ancient town.
