= Alexander of Trichonium =

3rd-century BC Greek general

- Died: 219 BC
- Occupation: Commander of the Aetolians
- Years active: c. 210s BC

Alexander (Ancient Greek: Ἀλέξανδρος) of Trichonium in Aetolia was an ancient Greek commander of the Aetolians in 218 and 219 BC. With about three thousand troops he attacked the rear guard (consisting of mercenaries and Acarnanians) of the army of Philip V of Macedon on his return from Thermus, but the attempt was unsuccessful, and many Aetolians were killed in the battle, which ended with the Aetolians being completely routed by Philip's forces.
