= Pyrrhias of Aetolia =

Pyrrhias (Greek: Πυρρίας) was an Aetolian general, who was sent by his countrymen during the Social War (220–217 BC), to take the command in Elis. Here he took advantage of the absence of Philip V of Macedon, and the incapacity of Eperatus the Achaean strategos, to make frequent incursions into the Achaean territories. Having established a fortified post on Mount Panachaikon, he laid waste the whole country as far as Rhion and Aigion. The next year (217 BC) he concerted a plan with Lycurgus, king of Sparta, for the invasion of Messenia. However, he failed in the execution of his part of the scheme, being repulsed by the Cyparissians before he could effect a junction with Lycurgus. In consequence he returned to Elis, but as the Eleans were dissatisfied with his conduct, he was shortly after recalled by the Aetolians and replaced by Euripidas. (Polybius V. 30, 91, 92, 94.) At a later period he obtained the office of strategos of the Aetolians, in the same year (208 BC) that this office was bestowed as an honorary title upon Attalus I, king of Pergamon. In the spring of that year he advanced with an army to Lamia to oppose the passage of Philip V of Macedon towards the Peloponnese. Though supported with an auxiliary force both by Attalus and by the Roman praetor Publius Sulpicius Galba Maximus, he was defeated by Philip in two successive battles (First and Second Battle of Lamia) and forced to retire within the walls of Lamia. (Livy, XXVII.30) It is not improbable that Sipyrrhicas, who appears in Livy (XXXI.46) as chief of the Aetolian deputation which met Attalus at Heracleia, is only a false reading for Pyrrhias.

Another Pyrrhias of Aetolia was an Olympic winner in the stadion race in 200 BC, according to the Chronicon of Eusebius of Caesarea. He may have been a son of the previous, although nothing confirms that supposition.
