= Callium =

Town in ancient Aetolia

Coordinates: 38°33′13″N 22°10′18″E

Callium or Kallion (Ancient Greek: Κάλλιον), or Callipolis or Kallipolis (Καλλίπολις), was the chief town of the Callienses (οἱ Καλλιῆς), situated on the eastern confines of ancient Aetolia, on one of the heights of Mount Oeta, and on the road from the valley of the Spercheus to Aetolia. It was by this road that the Gauls marched into Aetolia in 279 BCE, when they surprised and destroyed Callium, and committed the most horrible atrocities on the inhabitants. Callium also lay on the road from Pyra (the summit of Oeta, where Heracles was supposed to have burnt himself) to Naupactus, and it was divided by Mount Corax from lower Aetolia.

Its site is located near the modern Veloukhovos, at the site called "Steno", where the castle of Velouhovo was later built.

== Names and sources ==
Thucydides mentions its inhabitants (Callienses or Kallieis) as the easternmost part of the Aetolian tribe of the Ophioneis. It was their chief town, and it is possible that Callium constituted the administrative centre of all the Ophioneis, as attested by Pausanias. In the Hellenistic period, as attested by the inscriptions, the city was called Callipolis, as cited by Stephanus of Byzantium.

== History ==
Despite the fact that traces of habitation exist since the Geometric period, Callium was permanently settled in the 4th century BCE. Its prosperity is possibly related to the rise of the Aetolian League into an important power in Greece. Its geographic location was particularly important and it is perhaps the reason why it was ravaged and completely destroyed by the Gauls in 279 BCE. Following their campaign, the city was rebuilt. Several of its citizens, as attested epigraphically, rose to the political hierarchy of the Aetolian League. Excavations revealed a wealthy city, with civic organization and sanctuaries. However, the inhabitants seem to have taken part in the political frictions of the 2nd century BCE regarding the advent of ancient Rome. After the Battle of Pydna (167 BCE) it seems that Callium was destroyed by a fire, possibly due to arson.

In the 9th century CE, Lidoriki appears to have succeeded Callium as it features in the episcopal lists of that time. In the 14th and 15th centuries only the castle of Lidoriki (Velouhovo) is mentioned, possibly identified with the remains of buildings and fortifications preserved on the ancient acropolis.

== Archaeological remains ==
The site underwent systematic excavation in the period 1977–1979 by Petros Themelis. Following the excavations, the site was inundated by the waters of the dam lake of Mornos. Among the archaeological finds counted the fortification precinct, the sanctuaries of Demeter and Kore and possibly of Eileithyia or Artemis, the bouleuterion, the agora, the theatre and the necropolis. In the renowned "house of the Archive" were discovered about 600 clay sealings, small pieces of clay with which the sender of a letter would stick on the ribbon which held it tied. This piece of clay bore the imprint of the sender's seal as a token that the letter was genuinely written by him. The sealings, which were probably not fired, were preserved due to the fire which destroyed the house. On the imprints one discerns symbols of city-states, such as Chios, Lamia, Delphi, mythological creatures and profiles of male figures, recognised as prominent kings, such as Ptolemy Philopator, Attalus I, Prusias of Bithynia etc. The entire group of sealings leads to the conclusion that Callium or at least the receiver of the documents bearing them maintained relations with the political authorities of large part of mainland Greece, of the islands as well as of the Hellenistic kingdoms. Several of the movable artifacts and finds are displayed in the Archaeological Collection of Lidoriki, whereas some have been transferred also into the Archaeological Museum of Amphissa.

== Links ==
Odysseus: internet portal of the Hellenic Ministry of Culture and Sports https://web.archive.org/web/20140714153733/http://odysseus.culture.gr/h/3/eh351.jsp?obj_id=4923
