= Trichonium =

Coordinates: 38°31′41″N 21°31′41″E

Trichonium or Trichonion (Ancient Greek: Τριχώνιον) was a town of ancient Aetolia, from which Lake Trichonis derived its name. William Martin Leake identified its location in the 19th century south of the lake at a place called Gavala (Gavalou). Strabo mentions Trichonium along with Stratus as situated in a fertile plain. It was evidently a place of importance, and several natives of this town are mentioned in history.

Its site is located near the modern Gavalou.

== People ==
- Alexander of Trichonium
- Ariston (strategos)
