= Lyciscus of Aetolia =

Lyciscus (Ancient Greek: Λυκίσκος), an Aetolian and a partisan of Rome during the Third Macedonian War, was made general of the Aetolians in 171 BCE through the influence of Q. Marcius and A. Atilius, two of the Roman commissioners sent to Greece in that year.

In 167 BCE, the Aetolians complained to Aemilius Paullus, then making a progress through Greece, that Lyciscus and Tisippus (another partisan of Rome) had caused 550 of their senators to be slain by Roman soldiers, lent them by Aulus Baebius for the purpose, while they had driven others into banishment and seized their property. But the murder and violence had been perpetrated against partisans of Perseus of Macedon and opponents of Rome, and the Roman commissioners at Amphipolis decided that Lyciscus and Tisippus were justified in what they had done. Baebius only was condemned for having supplied Roman soldiers as the instruments of the murder.
