= Apelles (disambiguation) =

Apelles was a painter of ancient Greece.

Apelles may also refer to:

- Apelles (gnostic), the founder of a Gnostic sect in the 2nd century
- Apelles of Heraklion, one of the Seventy Disciples
- "Apelles", a pseudonym used by Jesuit Christoph Scheiner in writing on sunspots
- Apelles, a synonym for the butterfly genus Glaucopsyche
- HMS Apelles, an 1808 British Royal Navy ship
- Matthäus Apelles von Löwenstern (1594–1648), German psalmist, musician and statesman
