= Agelaus of Naupactus =

3rd-century BC Greek official

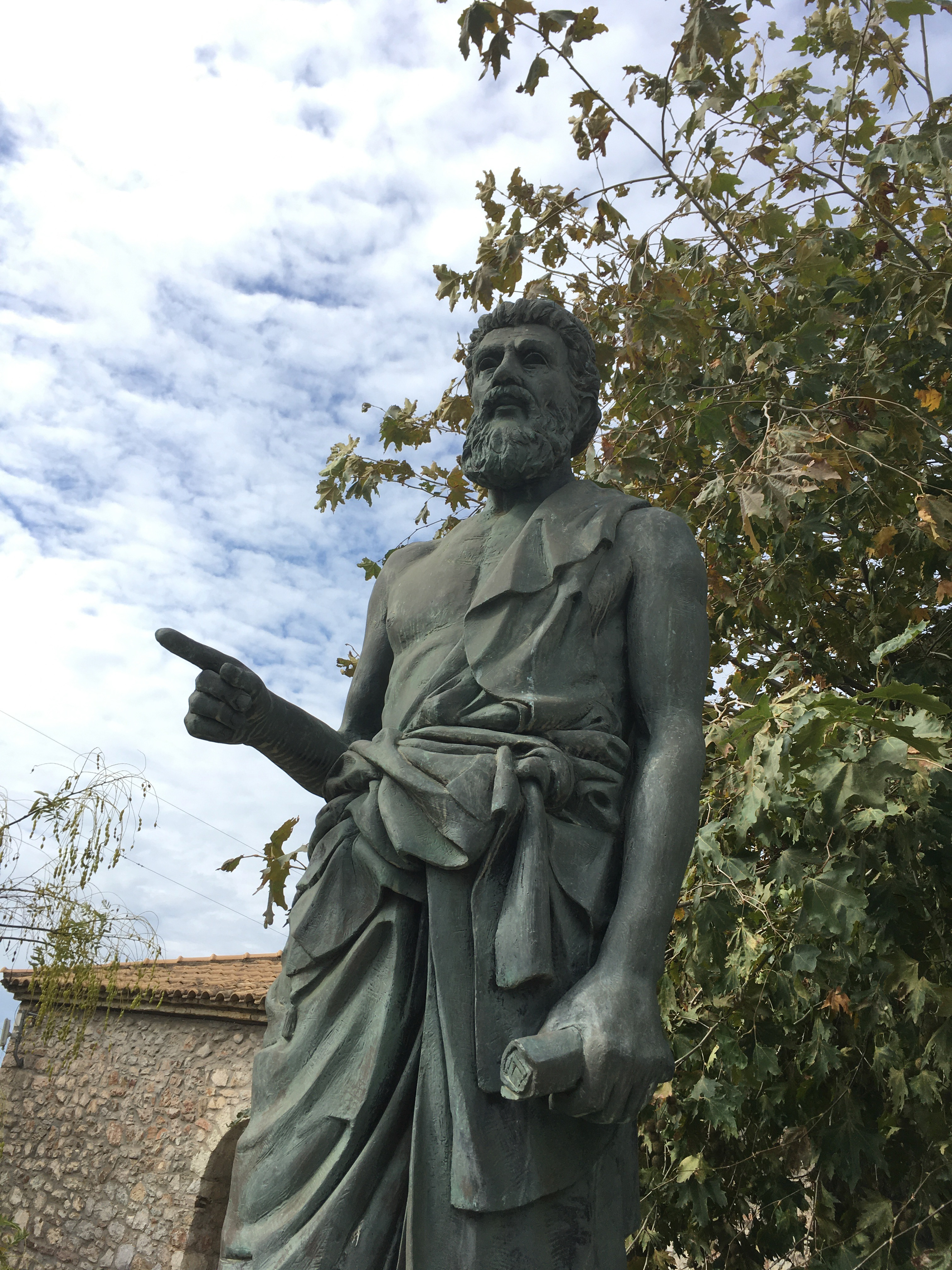

Agelaus of Naupactus (Ancient Greek: Ἀγέλαος) was a leading official in the Aetolian League, renowned for his efforts to promote peace in Naupactus. He was notably an advocate of the concept of brotherhood among all Greeks.

Despite being more famous as a general, it is said that his diplomatic skills were even more prominent. He is first mentioned when in 221 BC he negotiated an alliance between the Illyrian chief Scerdilaidas and the Aetolians. It was through his persuasive speech that Philip V of Macedon and his allies were induced to make peace with the Aetolians after the Social War (220–217 BC) and he was elected general of the Aetolians in the following year, though his conduct in recommending peace was soon afterwards criticized by his fickle countrymen.

Polybius quotes Agelaus as having given the following speech in favour of peace:

The best thing of all is that the Greeks should not go to war with each other at all, but give the gods hearty thanks if by all speaking with one voice, and joining hands like people crossing a stream, they may be able to repel the attacks of barbarians and save themselves and their cities. But if this is altogether impossible, in the present juncture at least we ought to be unanimous and on our guard, when we see the bloated armaments and the vast proportions assumed by the war in the west. For even now it is evident to any one who pays even a moderate attention to public affairs, that whether the Carthaginians conquer the Romans, or the Romans the Carthaginians, it is in every way improbable that the victors will remain contented with the empire of Sicily and Italy. They will move forward: and will extend their forces and their designs farther than we could wish. Wherefore, I beseech you all to be on your guard against the danger of the crisis, and above all you, O King. You will do this, if you abandon the policy of weakening the Greeks, and thus rendering them an easy prey to the invader; and consult on the contrary for their good as you would for your own person, and have a care for all parts of Greece alike, as part and parcel of your own domains. If you act in this spirit, the Greeks will be your warm friends and faithful coadjutors in all your undertakings; while foreigners will be less ready to form designs against you, seeing with dismay the firm loyalty of the Greeks. If you are eager for action, turn your eyes to the west, and let your thoughts dwell upon the wars in Italy. Wait with coolness the turn of events there, and seize the opportunity to strike for universal dominion. Nor is the present crisis unfavourable for such a hope. But I entreat you to postpone your controversies and wars with the Greeks to a time of greater tranquillity; and make it your supreme aim to retain the power of making peace or war with them at your own will. For if once you allow the clouds now gathering in the west to settle upon Greece, I fear exceedingly that the power of making peace or war, and in a word all these games which we are now playing against each other, will be so completely knocked out of the hands of us all, that we shall be praying heaven to grant us only this power of making war or peace with each other at our own will and pleasure, and of settling our own disputes.
