= Dorimachus =

General of the Aetolian League

Dorimachus (Ancient Greek: Δωρίμαχος), surnamed Trichonius by Polybius, was an Aetolian general and legislator who took an active part in the Social War (220–217 BC).

He was son of Nicostratus, and was born in ancient Trichonion in Aetolia, on the shores of what is now Lake Trichonida. In 219 BC, he was responsible for destroying the Sanctuary of Dodona. The ancient historian Polybius frequently mentions Dorimachus in his works.

Dorimachus is also referred to in a decree of the Delphic Amphictyony as a hieromnemon, a representative of the Aetolian League. In the modern city of Agrinio, there has been a street named after Dorimachus since 1920.

== External sources ==
- Smith's Dictionary
- Dorimachus attacks the oligarchs

== Bibliography ==
- Georg Visowa: "Dorimachos" (in German), 1905.
- Polybius. The Histories. Book IV.
