= Aetolia =

Aetolia Αἰτωλία
- Region
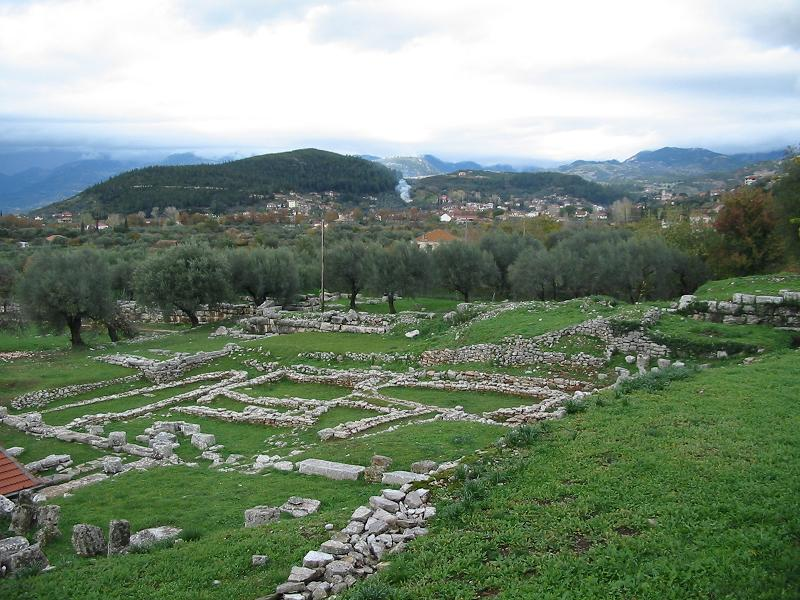
- Ancient Thermon, Aetolia

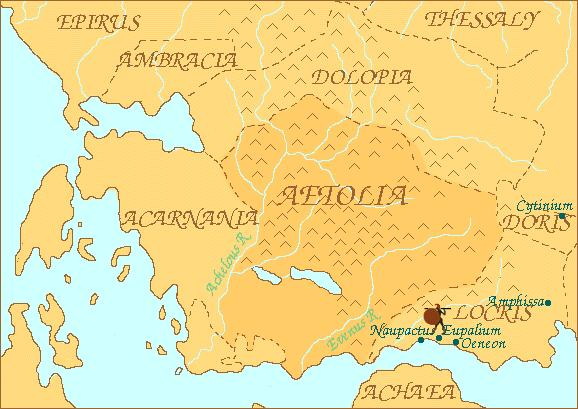
- Map of ancient Aetolia
- Country: Ancient Greece
- Location: Central Greece
- Major cities: Thermon; Calydon
- Dialects: Northwest Greek
- Key periods: Aetolian League (4th century BC - 188 BC)

Aetolia or Aitolia (Greek: Αἰτωλία, romanized: Aitōlía) was the homeland of the ancient Greek tribe of Aetolians. It was a mountainous region in western central Greece, and it formed the original core of the Aetolian League, which became a prominent power of Greece during the Hellenistic period.

The Achelous River separates Aetolia from Acarnania to the west. On the northwest, northeast and east it had boundaries with Epirus, Thessaly and Ozolian Locris respectively. Aetolia together with Achaea in Peloponnese on the opposite side, form the entrance to the Corinthian Gulf.

== Mythology ==
The mountains of Aetolia contained many wild beasts, and acquired fame in Greek mythology as the scene of the hunt for the Calydonian Boar, also called the Aetolian Boar.

Tribes known as Curetes – named after the nearby mountain Kourion, or just to stand out from the Acarnanians, who were called so because they were unshorn – and Leleges originally inhabited the country, but at an early period Greeks from Elis, led by the mythical eponym Aetolus, set up colonies. Dionysius of Halicarnassus mentions that Curetes was the old name of the Aetolians and Leleges the old name of the Locrians. The Aetolians took part in the Trojan War, under their king Thoas. In the Iliad Thoas is the leader of the forty-ship Aetoilian contingent at Troy.

== Early History ==
In classical times Aetolia comprised two parts: "Old Aetolia" (Greek: Παλιά Αιτωλία, romanized: Paliá Aitolía) in the west, from the Achelous to the Evenus and Calydon; and "New Aetolia" (Greek: Νέα Αιτωλία, romanized: Néa Aitolía) or "Acquired Aetolia" (Greek: Αἰτωλία Ἐπίκτητος, romanized: Aitolía Epíktitos) in the east, from the Evenus and Calydon to the Ozolian Locrians. The country has a level and fruitful coastal region, but an unproductive and mountainous interior.

The mountain tribes of Aetolia were the Ophioneis, the Apodotoi, the Agraeis, the Aperantoi and the Eurytanes. They worshiped Apollo as god of tame nature and Artemis as goddess of wilderness. They also worshiped Athena, not as goddess of wisdom, but emphasizing the element of war – i.e. a goddess that was a counterbalance to the god Ares. They called Apollo and Artemis "Laphrios gods," i.e. patrons of the spoils and loot of war. In addition, they worshiped Hercules, the river Achelous and Bacchus. In Thermos, an area north of Trichonis lake, there was after the 7th century a shrine of Apollo "Thermios," which became a significant religious center during the time of the Aetolian League. The Aetolians did not take part in the Persian Wars.

=== Athenian invasion ===
In 426 BC, during the Peloponnesian War, led by Aegitios, they defeated the Athenians and their allies, who had turned against Apodotia and Ophioneia under the general command of Demosthenes. However, they failed to regain Naupaktos, which had meanwhile been conquered by the Corinthians with the aid of the Athenians. At the end of the Archidamian War, the Aetolians took part as mercenaries of the Athenians in the expedition against Syracuse. Then the Achaeans occupied Calydon, but the Aetolians recovered it in 361 BC. In 338 BC, Naupaktos was again taken by the Aetolians, with the help of Philip II.

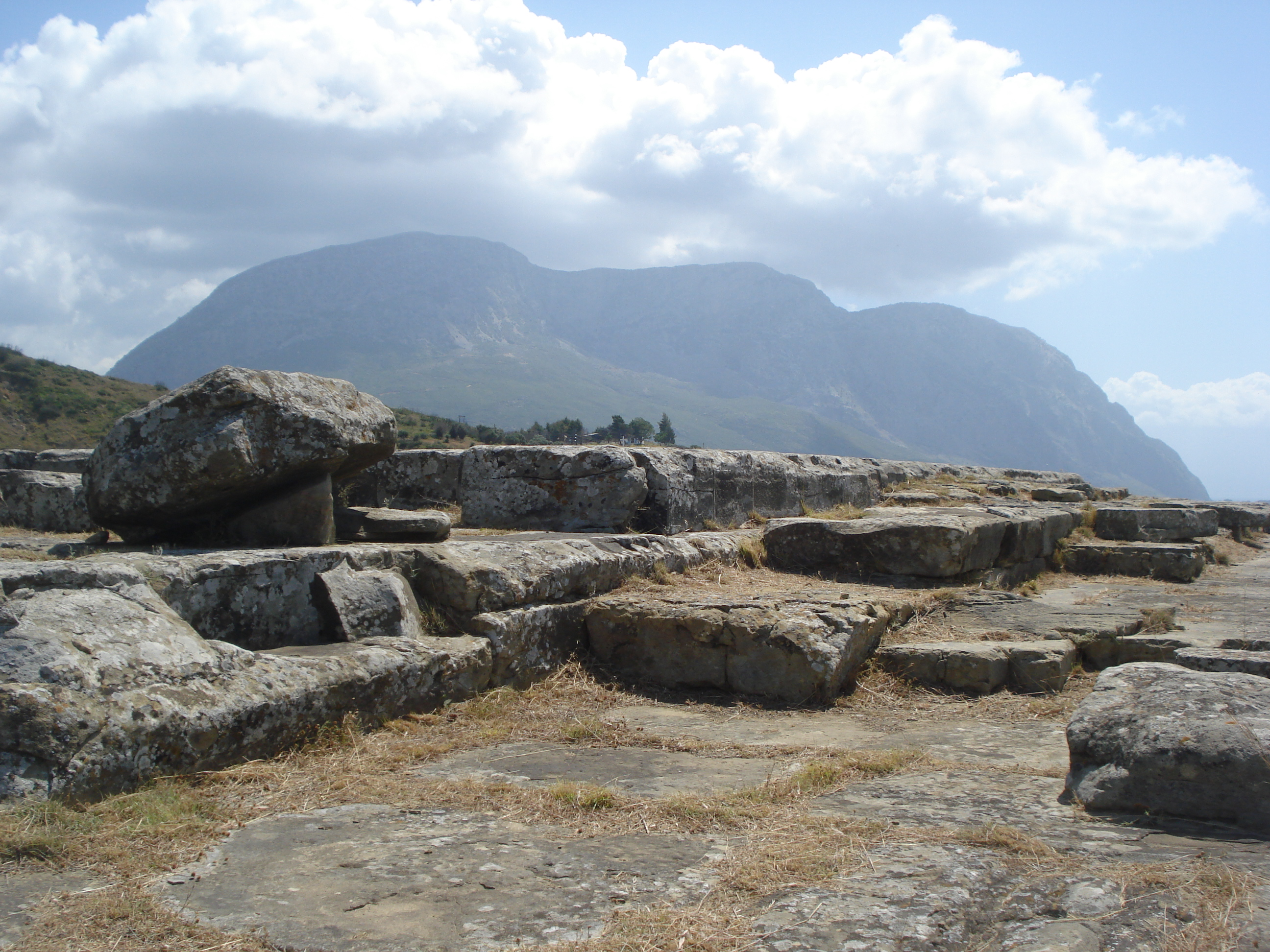
Ruins of the ancient Calydon

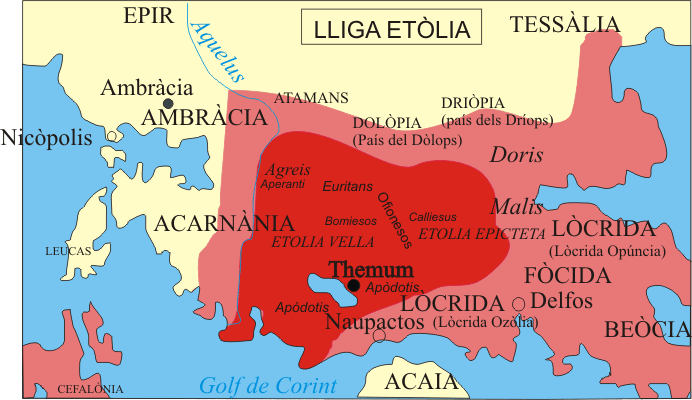
The Aetolian League, 3rd century B.C.

== Aetolian League ==
The Aetolians set up a united league, the Aetolian League, in early times. It soon became a powerful confederation (sympoliteia) and by c. 270s BC it became one of the leading military powers in ancient Greece. It had originally been organized during the reign of Philip II by the cities of Aetolia for their mutual benefit and protection and became a formidable rival to the Macedonian monarchs and the Achaean League.

=== Lamian War ===
During the Lamian War, the Aetolians helped the Athenian general Leosthenes defeat Antipater. As a result, they came into conflict with Antipater and Craterus, taking great risks, but were eventually saved by the disagreement between the two Macedonian generals and Perdiccas. The Acarnanians then attempted to invade their land, but the Aetolians were able to force them to flee.

=== Gallic invasion ===
The courage shown by the Aetolians during the Gallic invasion under Brennus, when they played a crucial role at the protection of the sanctuary of Delphi against the Gauls, increased their glamour and fame. Subsequently, the Sotiria Games were established by the Aetolians, in honour of Zeus the Saviour.

=== Illyrian raids ===
In 232 BC, the Illyrians under Agron attacked the Aetolians, and managed to take many prisoners and booty. In 229 BC, the Aetolians participated in a naval battle off the island of Paxos in a coalition with Korkyra and the Achaean League, and were defeated by a coalition of Illyrians and Acarnanians; as a result, the Korkyreans were forced to accept an Illyrian garrison in their city, which was put under the command of Demetrius of Pharos.

=== Social War ===
The Aetolians' power increasingly magnified with the occupation of the lands of Ozoloi, Locrians and Phocians, as well as Boeotia. They then united under the power of their League in the areas of Tegea, Mantinea, Orchomenus, Psophida and Phigaleia. Between 220 and 217 BC, the Social War broke out between the Achaean and Aetolian Leagues. The war was first started by the Aetolians with the help of the Spartans and Eleans. Allies of the Achaeans were the Macedonians, the Boeotians, the Phocians, the Epirotes, the Acarnanians and the Messenians.

=== Macedonian Wars and Aetolian War ===
The Aetolians allied with the Romans, while Philip V destroyed the temple of Apollo Thermios and allied with the Carthaginians. The Aetolians continued to fight on the side of the Romans even in the Battle of Cynoscephalae (196 BC), ignoring the great dangers looming for Greece as a result of this alliance. The Aetolians took the side of Antiochus III against the Roman Republic, and on the defeat of the Seleucid monarch in 189 BC, they became virtually the subjects of Rome.

== Language ==
The primitive lifestyle of those tribes made an impression on ancient historians. Thucydides claims that Eurytanes spoke a very difficult language and ate their food completely raw. They were semi-barbaric, warlike and predatory. Livy reports that Aetolians spoke the same language with Acarnanians and Macedonians.

== Ancient Historiography ==
Aetolia's reputation has suffered from a rather hostile treatment in the sources. Polybius, originating from Megalopolis, a major centre of the rival Achaean League, doubted the Greek heritage of Aetolians. Polybius is considered now to have a heavy anti-Aetolian bias and relying on Aetolia's opponent Aratus of Achaea.

== Towns ==
- Thermon
- Calydon
- Lysimachia (Aetolia)
- Pleuron (Aetolia)
- Trichonium
- Agrinium
- Callium

== Notable Aetolians ==
=== Mythological figures ===
- Aitolos, mythological hero
- Leda, Queen of Sparta and mother of Helen, Clytemnestra, and the Dioscuri by Zeus and Tyndareus
- Andraemon, father of Thoas
- Thoas, hero of the Trojan War

=== Historical figures ===
- Titormus, wrestler
- Agetas, general
- Alexander Aetolus, poet
- Damocritus, general
- Archedemus of Aetolia
- Dorimachus, general
- Nicolaus of Aetolia, general
- Theodotus of Aetolia, general
- Pyrrhias, stadion Olympic racer in 200 BC
- Pyrrhias of Aetolia, general
- Agelaus of Naupactus, leading man of the Aetolian League

== Roman and Medieval era ==
Following the conquest of the Achaeans by Lucius Mummius Achaicus in 146 BC, Aetolia became part of the Roman province of Achaea. When the Roman garrisons were withdrawn because of the civil wars in Rome, the Aetolians, too, began to fight each other. Following Octavius' victory at the Battle of Actium, the Aetolians who had sided with Antony disbanded completely. Octavius handed Calydon over to the Achaeans, who devastated it entirely and moved the statue of Artemis Laphria to Patras. There were subsequent invasions by Goths, Huns, and Vandals several centuries later at the end of the Roman Empire.

During the Middle Ages, Aetolia was part of the Byzantine Empire and of its successor Despotate of Epirus after 1204. In the 15th century it was conquered by the Ottoman Empire and became known as Karli-Eli. Aetolia was mentioned in Francisco Baltazar's Florante at Laura.

== Modern era ==
Today, the area of ancient Aetolia corresponds to the eastern part of the modern regional unit of Aetolia-Acarnania with its seat at Missolonghi, and Agrinio as its largest city, as well as some parts of modern Evrytania with its seat at Karpenisi.

== See also ==
- Hellenistic Greece
- Molossians
- Acarnanians
- Eleians
- Makedones
- Paeonians
- List of traditional Greek place names
- Aetolia Game
