= List of Ramsar sites in Greece =

The Ramsar Convention on Wetlands of International Importance Especially as Waterfowl Habitat is an international treaty for the conservation and sustainable use of wetlands. Adopted in 1971, it entered into force in 1975 and as of May 2022 had 172 contracting parties. Greece acceded on 21 December 1975 and has ten Ramsar sites as of May 2022, with a total surface area of 1,635 square kilometres (631 sq mi).

== Ramsar sites ==
Name	Region	Area	Designated	Image	National Park status	Coords.
Amvrakikos gulf	Epirus	23,649 hectares (91.31 sq mi)	1975		Amvrakikos Wetlands National Park	39°06′N 20°55′E
Artificial Lake Kerkini	Central Macedonia	10,996 hectares (42.46 sq mi)	1975		Lake Kerkini National Park	41°13′N 23°08′E
Axios, Loudias, Aliakmon Delta	Central Macedonia	11,808 hectares (45.59 sq mi)	1975		Axios-Loudias-Aliakmonas National Park	40°30′N 22°43′E
Evros Delta	Eastern Macedonia and Thrace	9,267 hectares (35.78 sq mi)	1975		Evros Delta National Park	40°50′N 26°04′E
Kotychi lagoons	Western Greece	6,302 hectares (24.33 sq mi)	1975		Kotychi-Strofylia Wetlands National Park	38°01′N 21°17′E
Lake Mikri Prespa	Western Macedonia	5,078 hectares (19.61 sq mi)	1975		Prespa National Forest	40°46′N 21°05′E
Lakes Volvi & Koronia	Central Macedonia	16,388 hectares (63.27 sq mi)	1975		National Park of Koronia and Volvi Lakes	40°41′N 23°20′E
Lake Vistonis, Porto Lagos, Lake Ismaris & adjoining lagoons	Eastern Macedonia and Thrace	24,396 hectares (94.19 sq mi)	1975		National Park of East Macedonia-Thrace	41°03′N 25°11′E
Messolonghi lagoons	Western Greece	33,687 hectares (130.07 sq mi)	1975		National Park of Messolonghi-Aitoliko lagoons, lower reaches and estuaries of Acheloos and Evinos rivers, and Echinades islands	38°20′N 21°15′E
Nestos delta & adjoining lagoons	Eastern Macedonia and Thrace	21,930 hectares (84.7 sq mi)	1975		National Park of East Macedonia-Thrace	40°54′N 24°47′E

== See also ==
- Ramsar Convention
- List of Ramsar sites worldwide
- List of national parks of Greece
- List of birds of Greece
