= National parks of Greece =

Greece is characterized by an extremely fragmented, rugged landscape hosting a great diversity of ecosystems and an outstanding biodiversity. Almost 5% of its extensive coastline consists of ecologically sensitive wetlands. Two thirds of the total population live no further than 2 km from the coast and most of the important urban centers are coastal, while almost all of the tourist infrastructure is divided among islands and the coastal mainland.

== Greek climate ==
Greece's climate is divided into three classes: A Mediterranean climate features mild, wet winters and hot, dry summers. Temperatures rarely reach extremes, although snowfalls do occur occasionally even in Athens, Cyclades or Crete during the winter. An alpine climate is found primarily in Western Greece (Epirus, Central Greece, Thessaly, Western Macedonia as well as central parts of the Peloponnese like Achaea, Arkadia and parts of Lakonia where the Alpine range pass by). A temperate climate is found in Central and Eastern Macedonia as well as in Thrace at places like Komotini, Xanthi and northern Evros; with cold, damp winters and hot, dry summers.

== History and legislation ==
The tradition of protected areas in Greece dates back to Ancient Greek times and the Altis and sacred grove at Olympia, amongst other sanctuaries. In more recent times, the country's climatic and biological diversity, along with the rich flora and fauna that comes with it, made the need for the creation of national parks obvious as early as 1937, when the government of Ioannis Metaxas first issued a law that established national parks in Greece, Law 856/1937 On National Woodland Parks, itself building on the "protected forests" of the Forest Code of 1929. In 1938, the first national park was established, centred on Mount Olympus, followed later in the same year by a second, centred on Mount Parnassus. In 1986, the legal framework was overhauled by Law 1650/1986, Article 19 of which provides for the following types of protected area:

- Absolute Nature Reserves Areas
- Nature Reserve Areas
- National Parks
- Protected Natural Formations, Protected Landscapes and Landscape Elements
- Eco-development Areas

Among the National Parks, according to Article 19 Section 3, where a National Park (εθνικό πάρκο) has a predominantly marine or forested character, it may become a National Marine Park (θαλάσσιο πάρκο) or National Woodland Park (εθνικός δρυμός).

== List of national parks ==
According to the World Database on Protected Areas, as of May 2022, there are 10 National Woodland Parks (εθνικοί δρυμοί), 2 National Marine Parks (θαλάσσια πάρκα), and 15 National Parks (εθνικά πάρκα).

=== National Woodland Parks ===
Name	Established	Area (Core Zone)	Area (Peripheral Zone)	Map	Photo	Ref.
Mount Ainos National Woodland Park Εθνικός Δρυμός Αίνου	1962	28.31 km^{2} (10.93 sq mi)	N/A	National parks of Greece is located in Greece		
Oiti National Woodland Park Εθνικός Δρυμός Οίτης	1966	34.68 km^{2} (13.39 sq mi)	38.85 km^{2} (15.00 sq mi)	National parks of Greece is located in Greece		
Olympus National Park Εθνικός Δρυμός Ολύμπου	1938	46.1 km^{2} (17.8 sq mi)	N/A	National parks of Greece is located in Greece		
Parnassos National Woodland Park Εθνικός Δρυμός Παρνασσού	1938	37.06 km^{2} (14.31 sq mi)	N/A	National parks of Greece is located in Greece		
Parnitha National Woodland Park Εθνικός Δρυμός Πάρνηθας	1961	39.5 km^{2} (15.3 sq mi)	N/A	National parks of Greece is located in Greece		
Pindos National Woodland Park Εθνικός Δρυμός Πίνδου	1966	31.54 km^{2} (12.18 sq mi)	35.15 km^{2} (13.57 sq mi)	National parks of Greece is located in Greece		
Prespes National Woodland Park Εθνικός Δρυμός Πρεσπών	1974	51.02 km^{2} (19.70 sq mi)	210.61 km^{2} (81.32 sq mi)	National parks of Greece is located in Greece		
Samaria National Woodland Park Εθνικός Δρυμός Σαμαριάς	1962	47.52 km^{2} (18.35 sq mi)	N/A	National parks of Greece is located in Greece		
Sounio National Woodland Park Εθνικός Δρυμός Σουνίου	1974	6.22 km^{2} (2.40 sq mi)	34.8 km^{2} (13.4 sq mi)	National parks of Greece is located in Greece		
Vikos-Aoos National Woodland Park Εθνικός Δρυμός Βίκου – Αώου	1973	32.38 km^{2} (12.50 sq mi)	95.95 km^{2} (37.05 sq mi)	National parks of Greece is located in Greece		

=== National Marine Parks ===
Name	Established	Area (Core Zone)	Area (Peripheral Zone)	Map	Photo	Ref.
National Marine Park of Alonnisos, Northern Sporades Εθνικό Θαλάσσιο Πάρκο Αλοννήσου Βορείων Σποράδων	1992	2,301.4 km^{2} (888.6 sq mi)	N/A	National parks of Greece is located in Greece		
National Marine Park of Zakynthos Εθνικό Θαλάσσιο Πάρκο Ζακύνθου	1999	104.33 km^{2} (40.28 sq mi)	37.34 km^{2} (14.42 sq mi)	National parks of Greece is located in Greece		

=== National Parks ===
Name	Established	Area (Core Zone)	Area (Peripheral Zone)	Map	Photo	Ref.
Amvrakikos Wetlands National Park Εθνικό Πάρκο Υγροτόπων Αμβρακικού	2008	287.63 km^{2} (111.05 sq mi)	1,522.7 km^{2} (587.9 sq mi)	National parks of Greece is located in Greece		
Axios-Loudias-Aliakmonas Delta National Park Εθνικό Πάρκο Δέλτα Αξιού – Λουδία – Αλιάκμονα	2009	337.79 km^{2} (130.42 sq mi)	N/A	National parks of Greece is located in Greece		
Chelmos-Vouraikos National Park Εθνικό Πάρκο Χελμού – Βουραϊκού	2009	544.4 km^{2} (210.2 sq mi)	N/A	National parks of Greece is located in Greece		
Dadia-Lefkimi-Soufli Forest National Park Εθνικό Πάρκο Δάσους Δαδιάς – Λευκίμμης – Σουφλίου	2006	432.0 km^{2} (166.8 sq mi)	N/A	National parks of Greece is located in Greece		
National Park of Eastern Macedonia and Thrace Εθνικό Πάρκο Ανατολικής Μακεδονίας και Θράκης	2008	929.47 km^{2} (358.87 sq mi)	1.88 km^{2} (0.73 sq mi)	National parks of Greece is located in Greece		
Evros Delta National Park Εθνικό Υγροτοπικό Πάρκο Δέλτα Έβρου	1977	128.96 km^{2} (49.79 sq mi)	61.91 km^{2} (23.90 sq mi)	National parks of Greece is located in Greece		
Lake Kerkini National Park Εθνικό Πάρκο Λίμνης Κερκίνης	2007	824.15 km^{2} (318.21 sq mi)	N/A	National parks of Greece is located in Greece		
National Park of Lakes Koronia-Volvi and the Macedonian Tempe Εθνικό Πάρκο Κορώνειας – Βόλβης και Μακεδονικών Τεμπών	2004	159.28 km^{2} (61.50 sq mi)	1,921.57 km^{2} (741.92 sq mi)	National parks of Greece is located in Greece		
Kotychi-Strofylia Wetlands National Park Εθνικό Πάρκο Υγροτόπων Κoτυχίου – Στροφιλιάς	2009	159.75 km^{2} (61.68 sq mi)	72.01 km^{2} (27.80 sq mi)	National parks of Greece is located in Greece		
National Park of the Messolonghi-Aitoliko Lagoon, lower reaches and estuaries of Acheloos and Evinos rivers and Echinades islands Εθνικό Πάρκο Λιμνοθαλασσών Μεσολογγίου – Αιτωλικού, κάτω ρου και εκβολών ποταμών Αχελώου και Εύηνου και νήσων Εχινάδων	2006	360.73 km^{2} (139.28 sq mi)	256.22 km^{2} (98.93 sq mi)	National parks of Greece is located in Greece		
North Pindos National Park Εθνικό Πάρκο Βόρειας Πίνδου	2005	1,462.59 km^{2} (564.71 sq mi)	483.87 km^{2} (186.82 sq mi)	National parks of Greece is located in Greece		
Prespa National Park Εθνικό Πάρκο Δρυμού Πρεσπών	2009	324.03 km^{2} (125.11 sq mi)	N/A	National parks of Greece is located in Greece		
Rodopi Mountain Range National Park Εθνικό Πάρκο Οροσειράς Ροδόπης	2009	549.29 km^{2} (212.08 sq mi)	1,200.63 km^{2} (463.57 sq mi)	National parks of Greece is located in Greece		
Schinias-Marathon National Park Εθνικό Πάρκο Σχινιά – Μαραθώνα	2000	14.39 km^{2} (5.56 sq mi)	N/A	National parks of Greece is located in Greece		
National Park of Tzoumerka, Peristeri & Arachthos Gorge Εθνικό Πάρκο Τζουμέρκων Περιστερίου Χαράδρας Αράχθου	2009	723.6 km^{2} (279.4 sq mi)	95.94 km^{2} (37.04 sq mi)	National parks of Greece is located in Greece		

== Layout ==
Each national park consists of a core and the area surrounding it. According to Greek Law the core cannot be smaller than 15,000,000 square metres (5.8 mi^{2}), with the exception of marine national parks. The surrounding area must be larger than, or at least equal to, the size of the core.

In the core of the national park, only scientific research, mild recreational activities, and the acquiring of environment related information are permitted. The creation of menageries, fish farms, the building of roads, outposts, camping and hiking infrastructures, along with woodcutting infrastructures and pastures are permitted in the surrounding area of the national park.

== See also ==
- List of Ramsar sites in Greece
- Wildlife of Greece
