= Dadia Forest =

Forest in Greece

Coordinates: 41°07′22″N 26°13′42″E

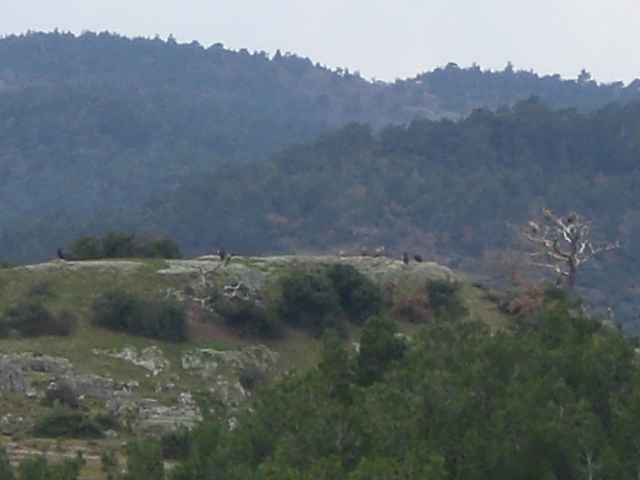
Vultures in Dadia Forest

The Dadia Forest is a large area of natural woodland in the Evros regional unit in northeastern Greece. The forest consists mostly of oak and pine. It is one of the most important areas in Europe for birds of prey, and the only forest in Europe where all four European species of vulture can be seen. It is a fully managed protected area of 7,290 hectares (18,000 acres) and is visited by about 35,000 people each year.

== History ==
=== 2023 wildfire ===
The major wildfire of August 2023 burned around 73.000 hectares (730 square kilometers) near Alexandroupolis, mostly in the Dadia Forest, leaving 18 people dead. This fire lasted 17 days and was stated to be "the largest recorded in the EU" up to 2023 by EU officials. The fire burned just over 50% of the Dadia Forest and it is estimated the burnt areas will take 10 years to show signs of recovery and up to 80 years to return to its original state.

== Geography ==
The forest is located in northeastern Greece, to the northeast of Alexandroupolis, close to the border with Turkey, where the eastern end of the Rhodope Mountains are largely uninhabited and unspoiled. The area is one of tree-covered rolling hills, the Evros Hills, reaching up to about 800 metres (2,600 ft) but without any high peaks. The protected area covers an area of 7,290 hectares (18,000 acres) and is surrounded by a buffer zone of about 28,000 hectares (69,000 acres). The underlying rocks are igneous, some being alkaline and others acidic. Most of the area is forested, but there are some scrubland, grassland and cultivated areas. The trees are mostly oaks and pines, with some areas of primary forest and other areas of secondary, regenerated growth.

== Flora ==
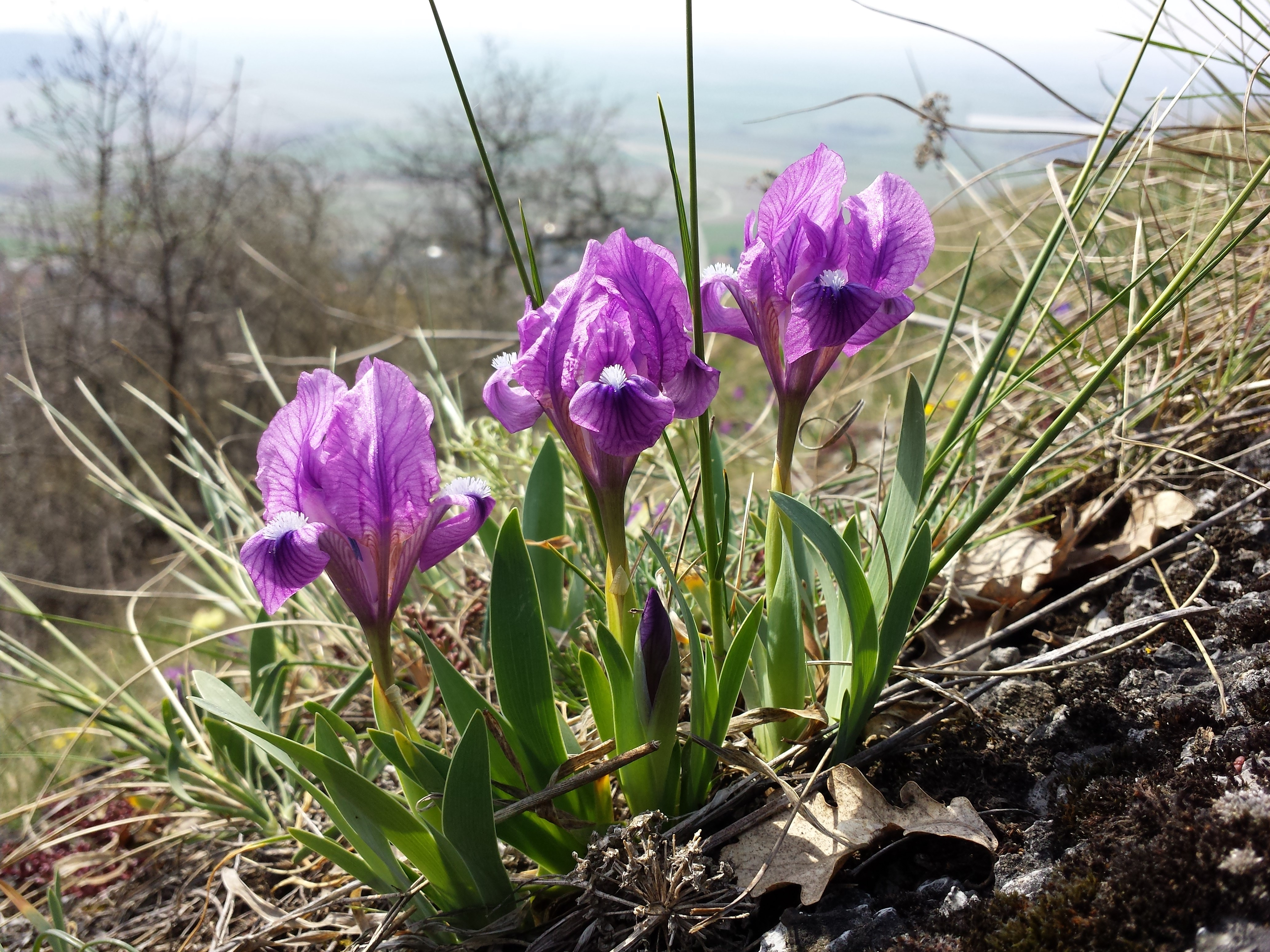
Iris pumila

The dominant trees in Dadia Forest are Turkish pine, black pine, and three species of oak. Growing among these are cornelian cherry, smoke bush, eastern hornbeam, hop hornbeam, wild service tree and turpentine tree. Herbaceous plants, herbs and bulbous plants include paeonies, various orchids, dwarf iris, Iris reichenbachii, Fritillaria pontica, wild tulips, Crocus pulchellus and Colchicum.

== Fauna ==
About 36 species of mammal have been recorded in the protected area, as well as 40 species of reptile and amphibian, but it is as a bird reserve that the forest is best known. 36 of the 38 diurnal species of European birds of prey are present, as well as 6 nocturnal species (owls). All four native European species of vulture, the black, bearded, Egyptian and griffon vultures are found here; Dadia is the only forest in Europe where this happens. Eagles are plentiful, with several pairs of golden eagle nesting in the protected area. Smaller raptors include lanner falcon, levant sparrowhawk and horned owl. Both black and white storks breed here, and among the smaller birds are semicollared flycatcher, roller, masked shrike and eastern Bonelli's warbler. Altogether, 219 species of bird have been recorded.

== Visitor information ==
The forest is a fully managed protected area and is visited by about 35,000 visitors each year. These bring economic benefits to the village of Dadia and to the wider area. Other facilities include an Ecotourism Centre, an information centre, and a coffee shop and restaurant. Cars are not permitted, but minibus ecotours are organised, and visitors can follow the trails on foot. There is a hostel near Dadia and various tracks through the forest. Carcases are put out each day to help feed the vultures and other raptors and provide a spectacle for visitors, who can watch from a hide some 600 m (2,000 ft) away.

== See also ==
- Dadia-Lefkimi-Soufli Forest National Park
