= Dadia-Lefkimi-Soufli Forest National Park =

National park in Evros, Greece

- Εθνικό Πάρκο Δάσους Δαδιάς-Λευκίμης-Σουφλίου
- IUCN category VI (protected area with sustainable use of natural resources)
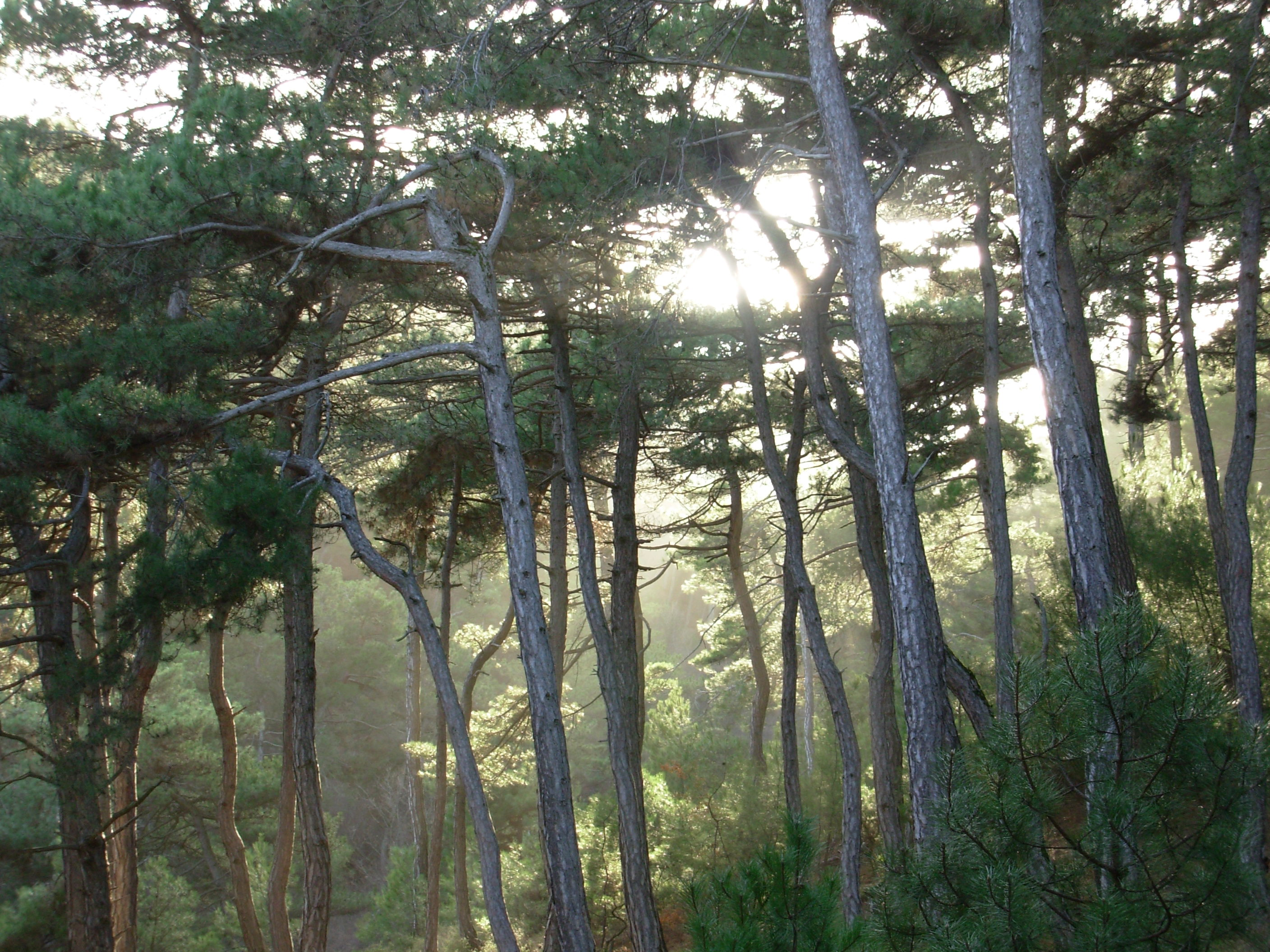
- Interactive map of Dadia-Lefkimi-Soufli Forest National Park
- Location: Evros, Greece
- Nearest town: Soufli (Dadia, Lefkimmi [el])
- Coordinates: 41.13°N 26.22°E
- Area: 428 km^{2} (165 mi^{2})
- Established: 2006

Dadia-Lefkimi-Soufli Forest National Park (Greek: Εθνικό Πάρκο Δάσους Δαδιάς-Λευκίμης-Σουφλίου) is a national park in the region of Eastern Macedonia and Thrace, Greece. Local surveys have recorded at least 60 species of mammals, 12 of amphibians, 29 of reptiles, and 104 of butterflies, alongside 360–400 plant species; birds include the Black vulture, Egyptian vulture, and Griffon vulture. Ecotourism in the park, initiated and developed by WWF Greece since the early 1990s, has successfully combined biodiversity conservation—particularly of endangered raptors—with local economic development, boosting employment and community involvement. The project includes visitor infrastructure, environmental education, and guided experiences.

== History ==
After initial protection in 1980, in 2006 the national park was established, protecting an area of some 428 km^{2} (165 sq mi). In 2014, the National Park of Dadia - Lefkimi - Souflion was submitted for future inscription on the UNESCO World Heritage List, under criterion x; currently, the submission resides on the Tentative List.

=== 2023 wildfire ===
The major wildfire of August 2023 burned around 73.000 hectares (730 square kilometers) near Alexandroupolis, mostly in the Dadia Forest, leaving 18 people dead. This fire was stated to be "the largest recorded in the EU" up to this time by EU officials.

== Ecotourism ==
The Dadia-Lefkimi-Soufli Forest National Park has successfully integrated ecotourism as a strategy for conservation and local community development. The initiative began in 1992 under the guidance of WWF Greece, focusing initially on conservation of the park's significant raptor populations, including vultures whose numbers had declined due to changes in local farming practices. Recognising that conservation needed local community support to succeed, WWF Greece developed ecotourism infrastructure and opportunities that combined environmental protection with economic benefits.

Central to the ecotourism approach is the Dadia Ecotourism Centre, completed in 1995 with EU funding secured by WWF. Located near Dadia village, it includes accommodation facilities, an information centre, and a café and shop staffed by local residents. A women's cooperative established in 1993 further supports community engagement, selling local food products and operating a small restaurant.

WWF Greece constructed marked trails and observation facilities, including an observation post built in 1998 overlooking a raptor feeding site, to attract visitors and provide educational opportunities. Volunteer programmes involving youth from various parts of Greece help maintain these trails and enhance cultural exchanges with the local community.

Visitor numbers have significantly increased, rising from about 10,000 in 1995 to over 50,000 in 2003. The majority of visitors are Greek nationals, with educational groups, private tours, and independent tourists forming the main visitor segments. Local guides trained by WWF Greece play a role in visitor management, providing interpretive services and educating tourists on appropriate conduct within the sensitive natural environment.

Management of ecotourism has progressively transitioned to the community-run Dadia Municipal Enterprise, established in 1994, ensuring long-term sustainability and local ownership. WWF continues its involvement by providing environmental education, conservation monitoring, and guidance to ensure the ongoing protection of the park's biodiversity. Challenges remain, such as managing visitor expectations and encouraging responsible promotion by tour operators.

== See also ==
- List of World Heritage Sites in Greece
- National parks of Greece
- Dadia Forest
