= Prespa National Park =

Prespa National Park may refer to:

- Prespa National Park (Albania), in south-eastern Albania
- Prespa National Park (Greece), in north-western Greece

== See also ==
- Galičica National Park, adjacent national park in North Macedonia
