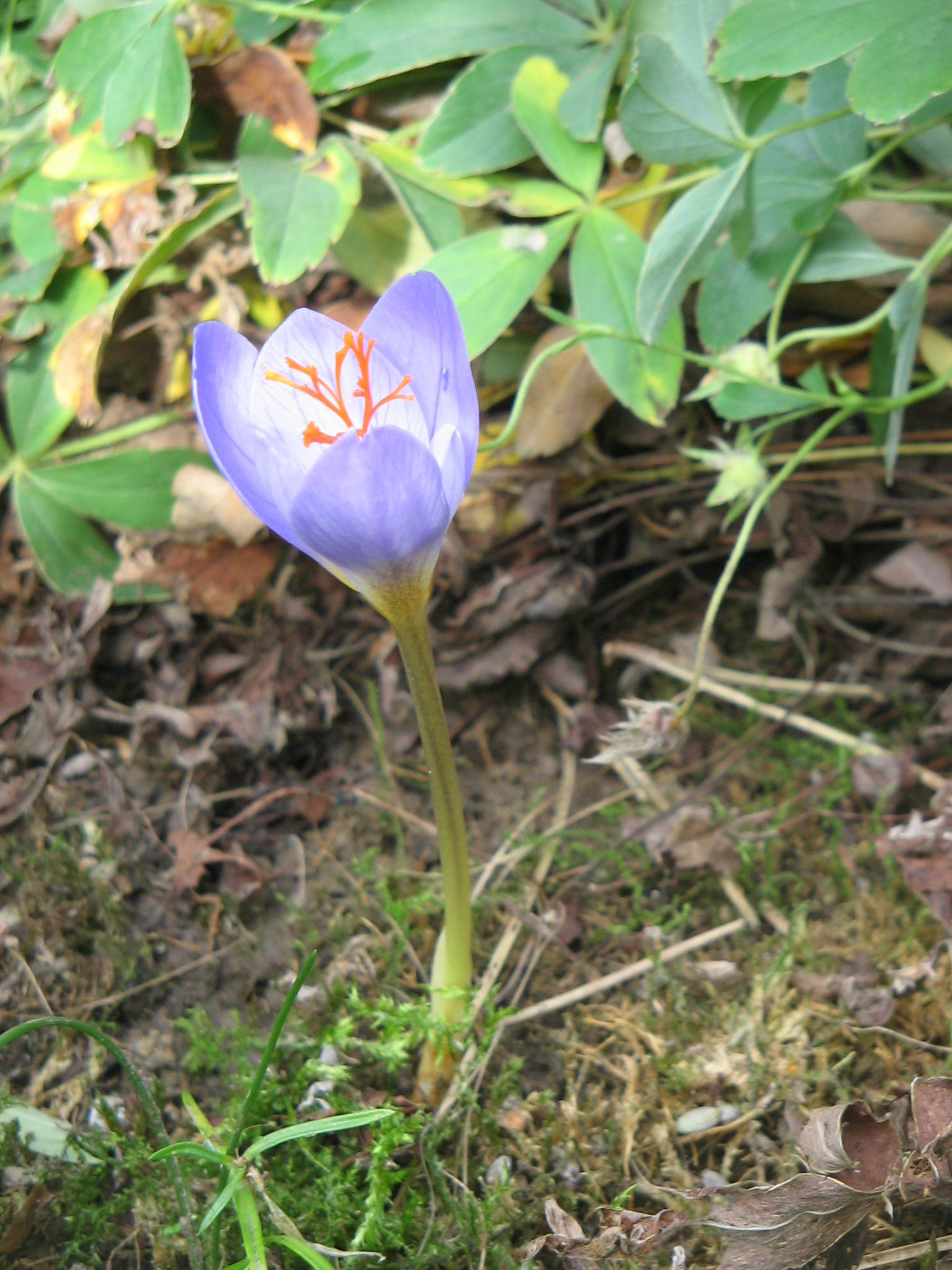

Scientific classification
- Kingdom: Plantae
- Clade: Tracheophytes
- Clade: Angiosperms
- Clade: Monocots
- Order: Asparagales
- Family: Iridaceae
- Genus: Crocus
- Species: C. pulchellus

Binomial name
- Crocus pulchellus Herb.

Synonyms
- Crocus constantinopolitanus Hertoldt ex Maw

= Crocus pulchellus =

Species of flowering plant

Crocus pulchellus, the hairy crocus is a species of flowering plant in the family Iridaceae. It is found the Northern Balkan Peninsula to Northwestern Turkey.

Growing to 10 cm (3.9 in), it is a cormous perennial, with pale lilac-blue flowers produced in the autumn, before the leaves appear. It has gained the Royal Horticultural Society's Award of Garden Merit.
