= Mount Ainos National Park =

National park in Cephalonia, Greece

- IUCN category II (national park)
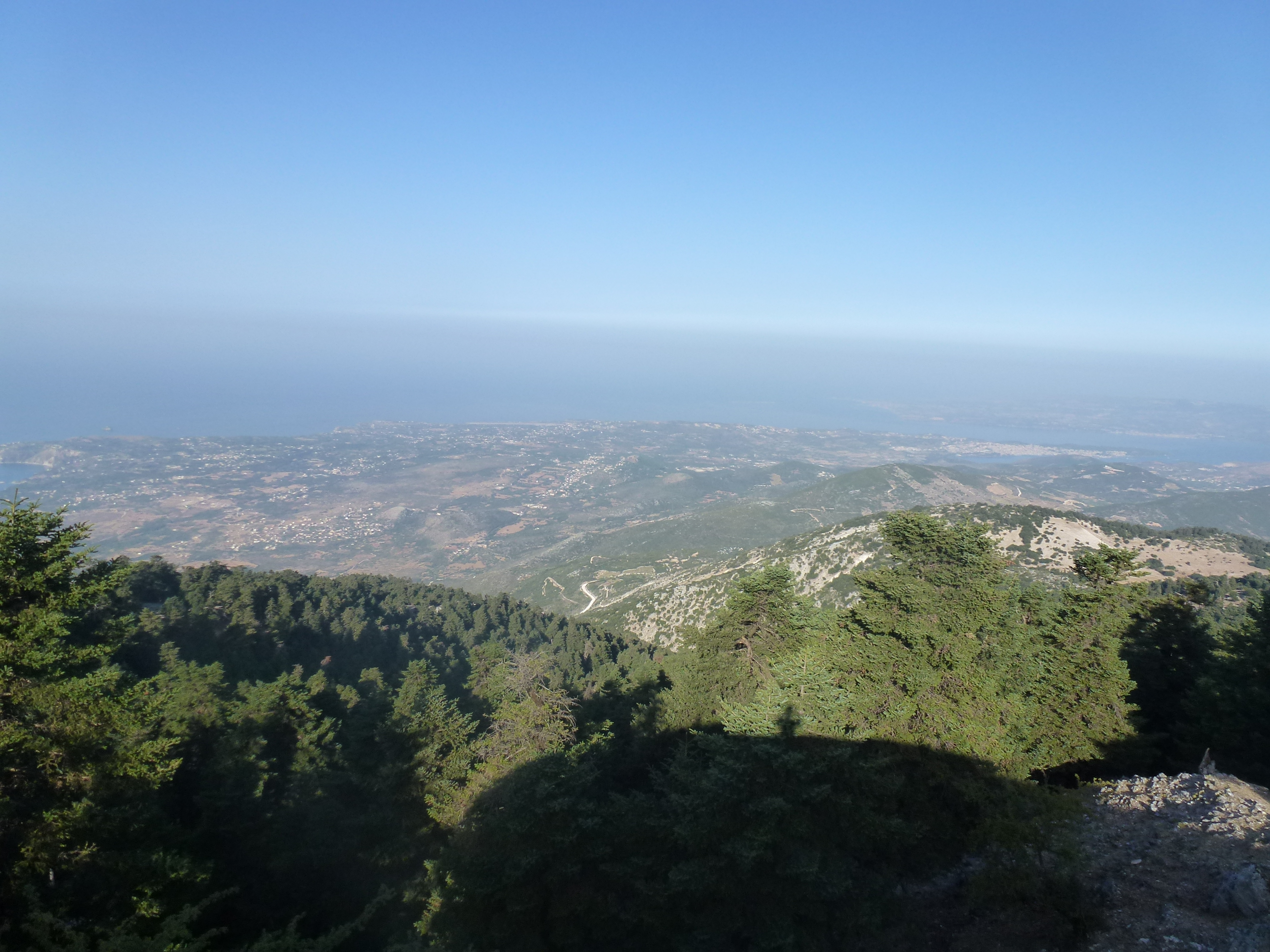

- Location within Greece
- Interactive map of Mount Ainos National Park
- Coordinates: 38°08′25″N 20°39′31″E
- Area: 28.31 km^{2} (10.93 sq mi)
- Established: 1962

Mount Ainos National Park (Greek: Εθνικός δρυμός Αίνου) is a national park in Cephalonia, Greece. It is located on Mount Ainos and is the smallest of Greece's national parks.

It was established in 1962, and now contains more than 3,000 hectares.

== Gallery ==
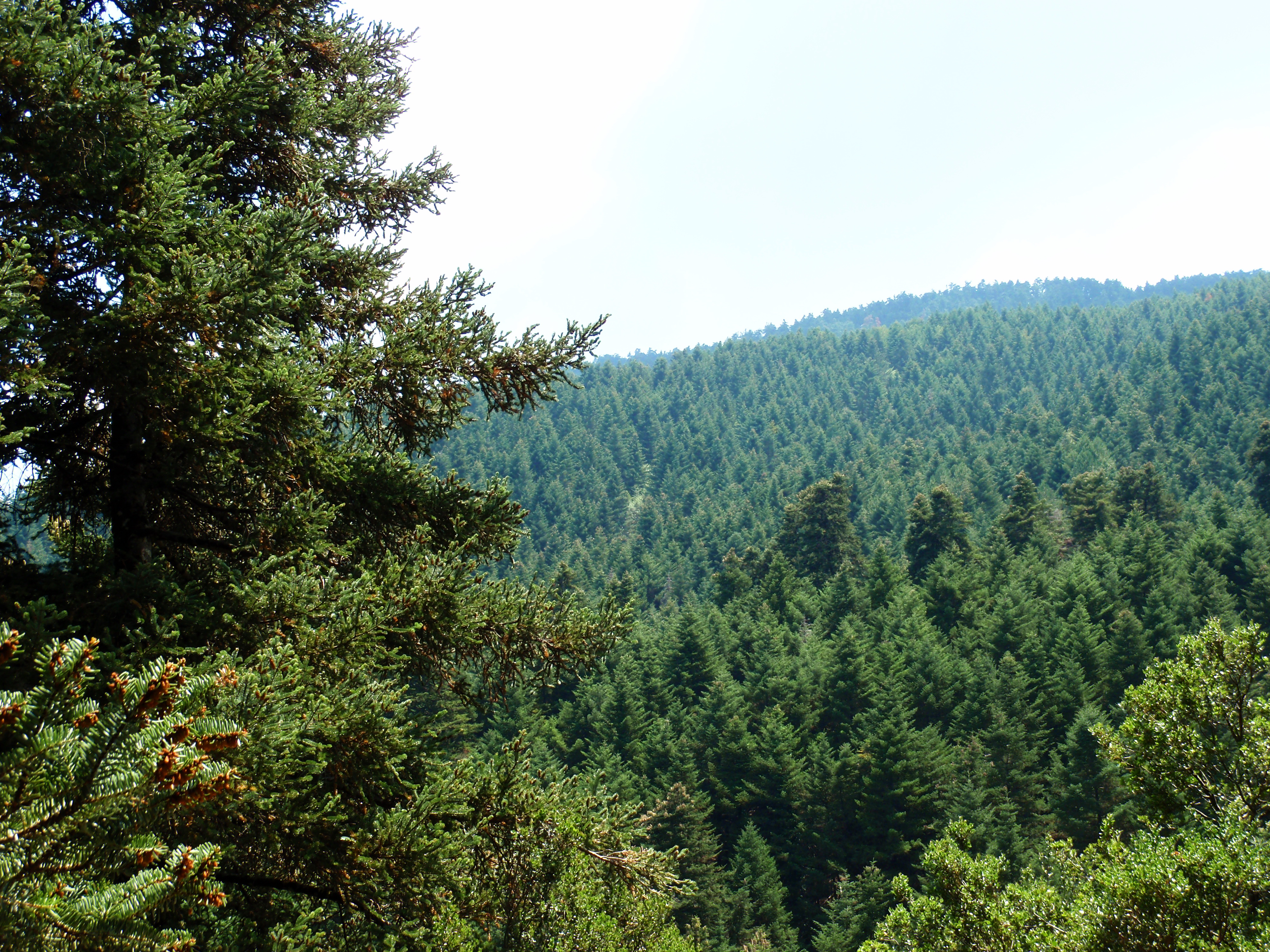

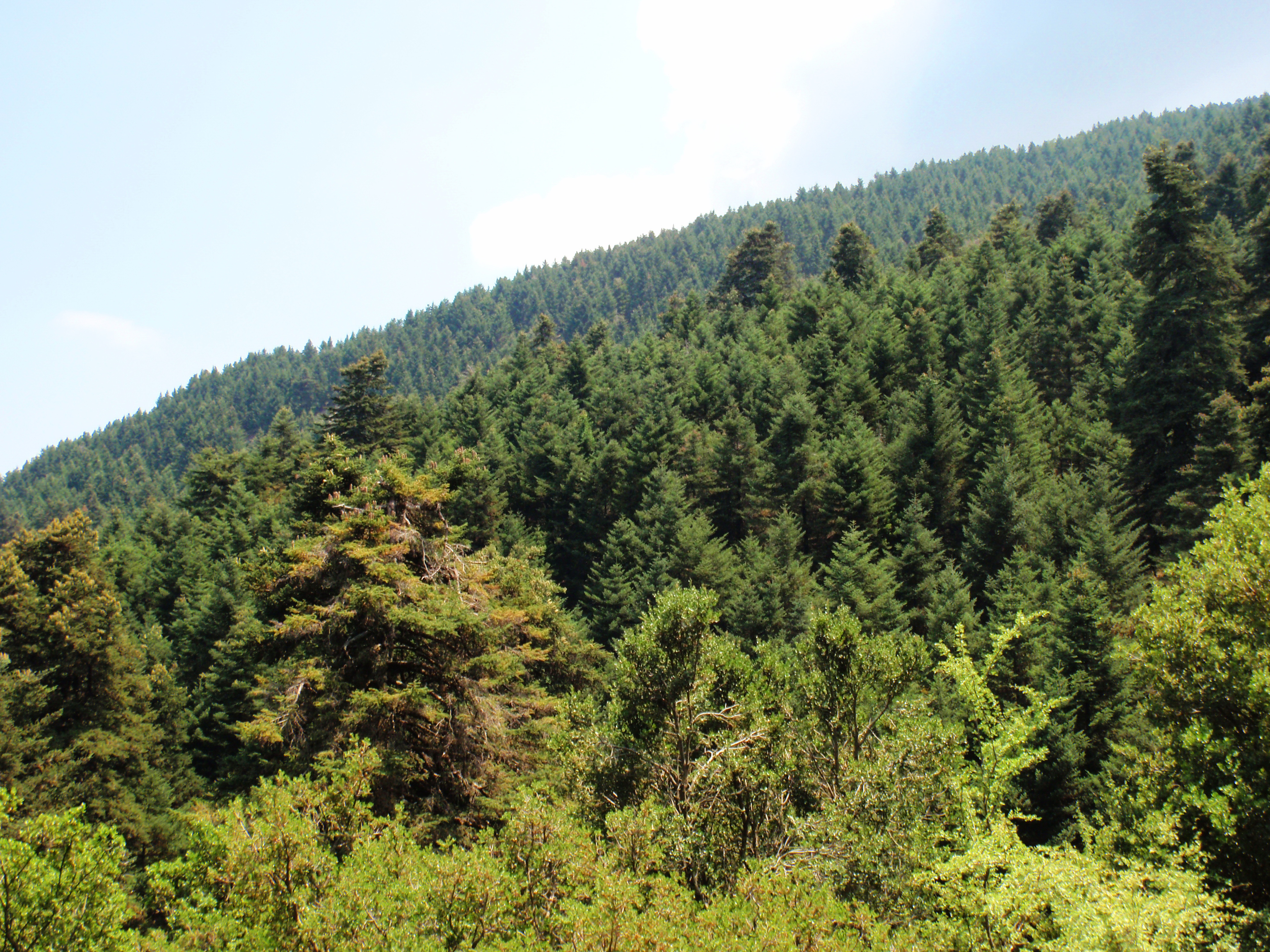
