= Dadia =

Dadia Δαδιά
- Community
- Location within Greece
- Coordinates: 41°8′N 26°13′E
- Country: Greece
- Geographic region: Western Thrace
- Administrative region: Eastern Macedonia and Thrace
- Regional unit: Evros
- Municipality: Soufli
- Municipal unit: Soufli

Population (2021)
  - Community: 409
- Time zone: UTC+2 (EET)
  - Summer (DST): UTC+3 (EEST)
- Vehicle registration: EB

Dadia (Greek: Δαδιά) is a village and a community in the northwestern part of the Evros regional unit, Eastern Macedonia and Thrace, Greece. Dadia is in the municipality of Soufli. Its population in 2021 was 409 for the community, including the village Kotronia. It is located southwest of Soufli and north of Feres. The name originates from a resinous pine wood which in the past was used for lighting.

== Population ==
Year	Village population	Community population
1981	826	-
1991	737	-
2001	800	823
2011	533	546
2021	403	409

== Geography ==
Dadia is situated on the western edge of the lower Evros valley, at the foot of wooded hills. Dadia Forest is a well known nature reserve, in which endangered species of birds of prey, including Aquila heliaca and Aquila pomarina, find refuge.

== Gallery ==
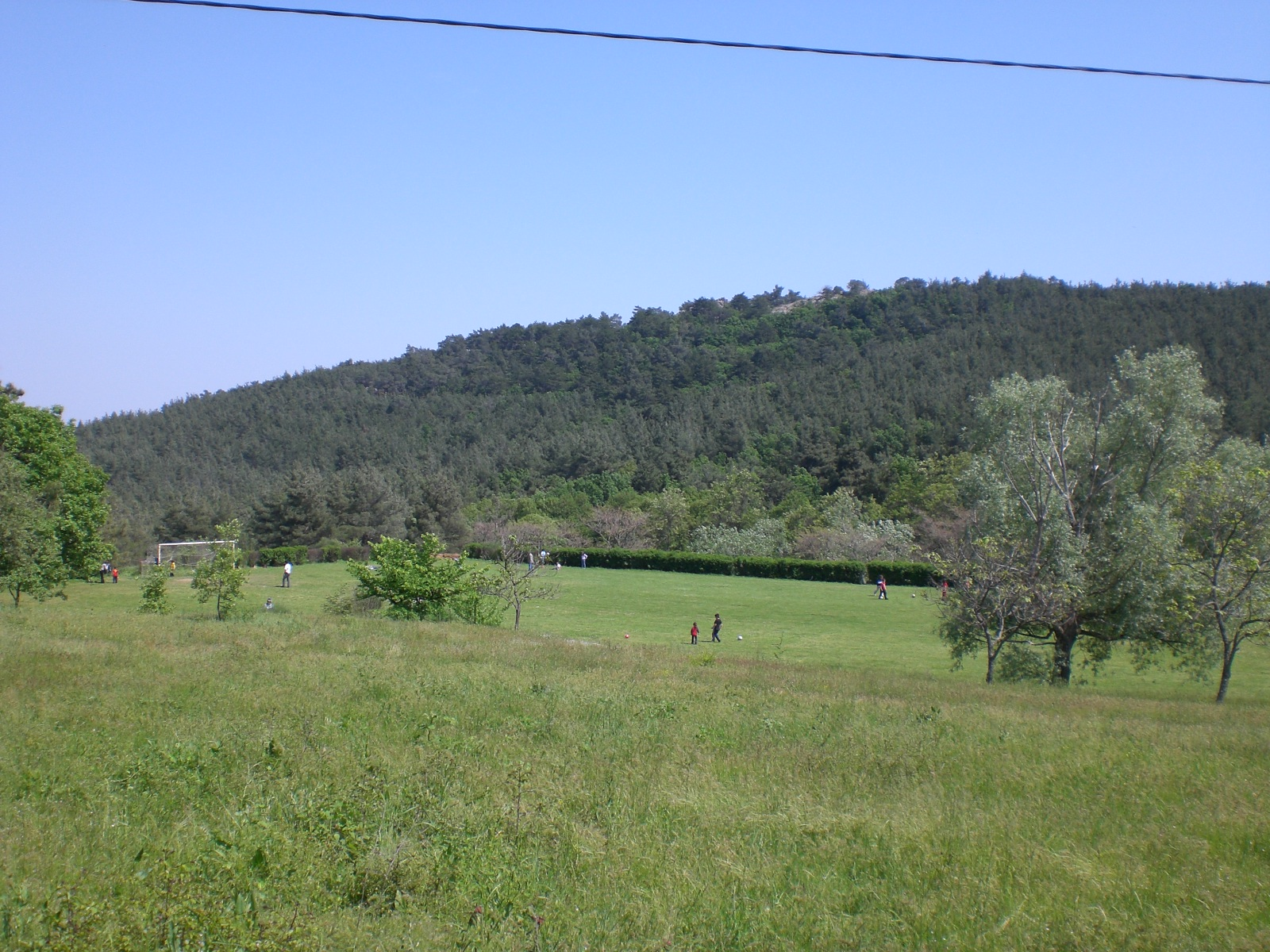
Dadia forest

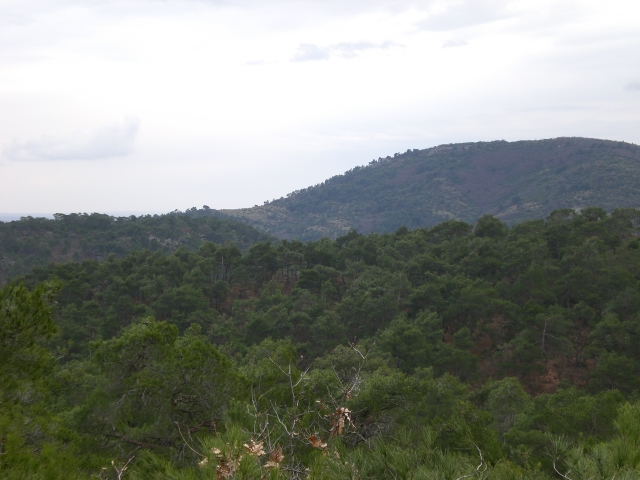
Forest and hill

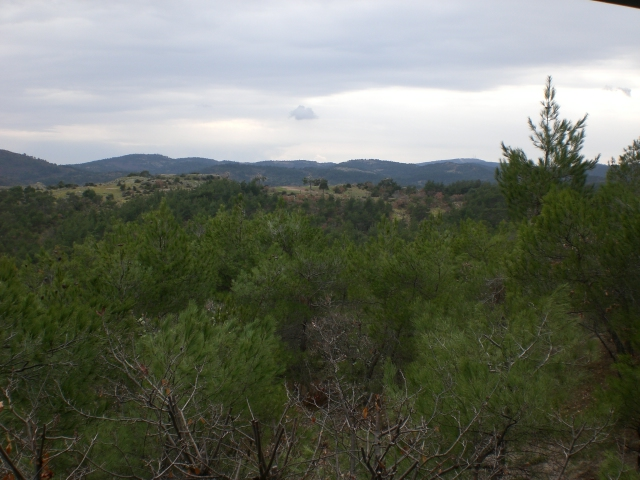
Dadia forest landscape

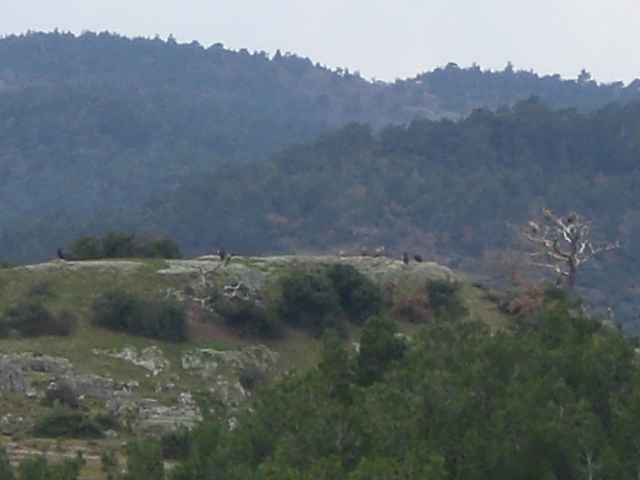
Vultures on a hill crest

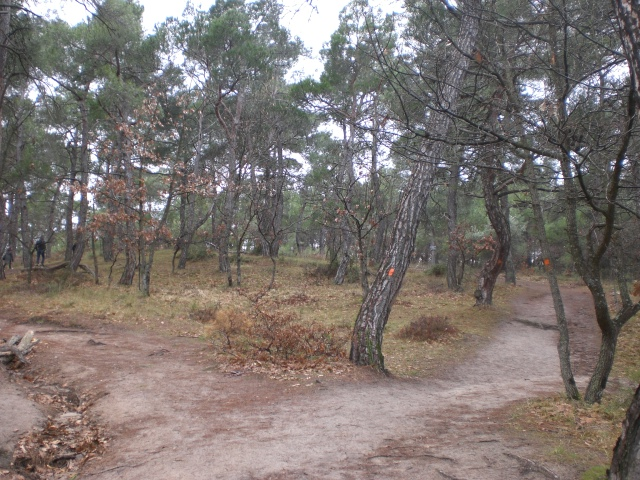
Track leading into the forest

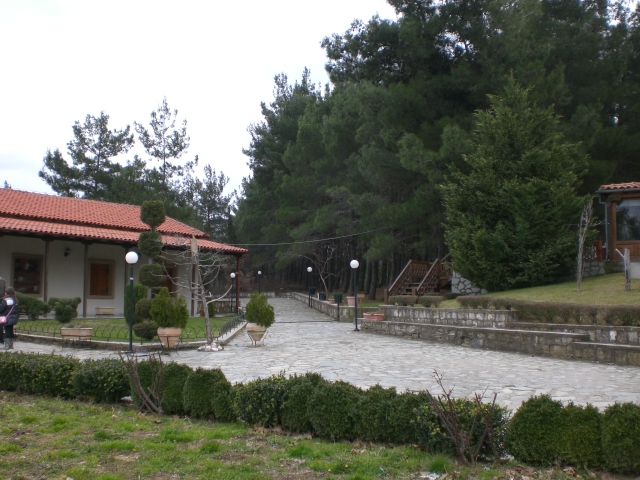
Visitor centre

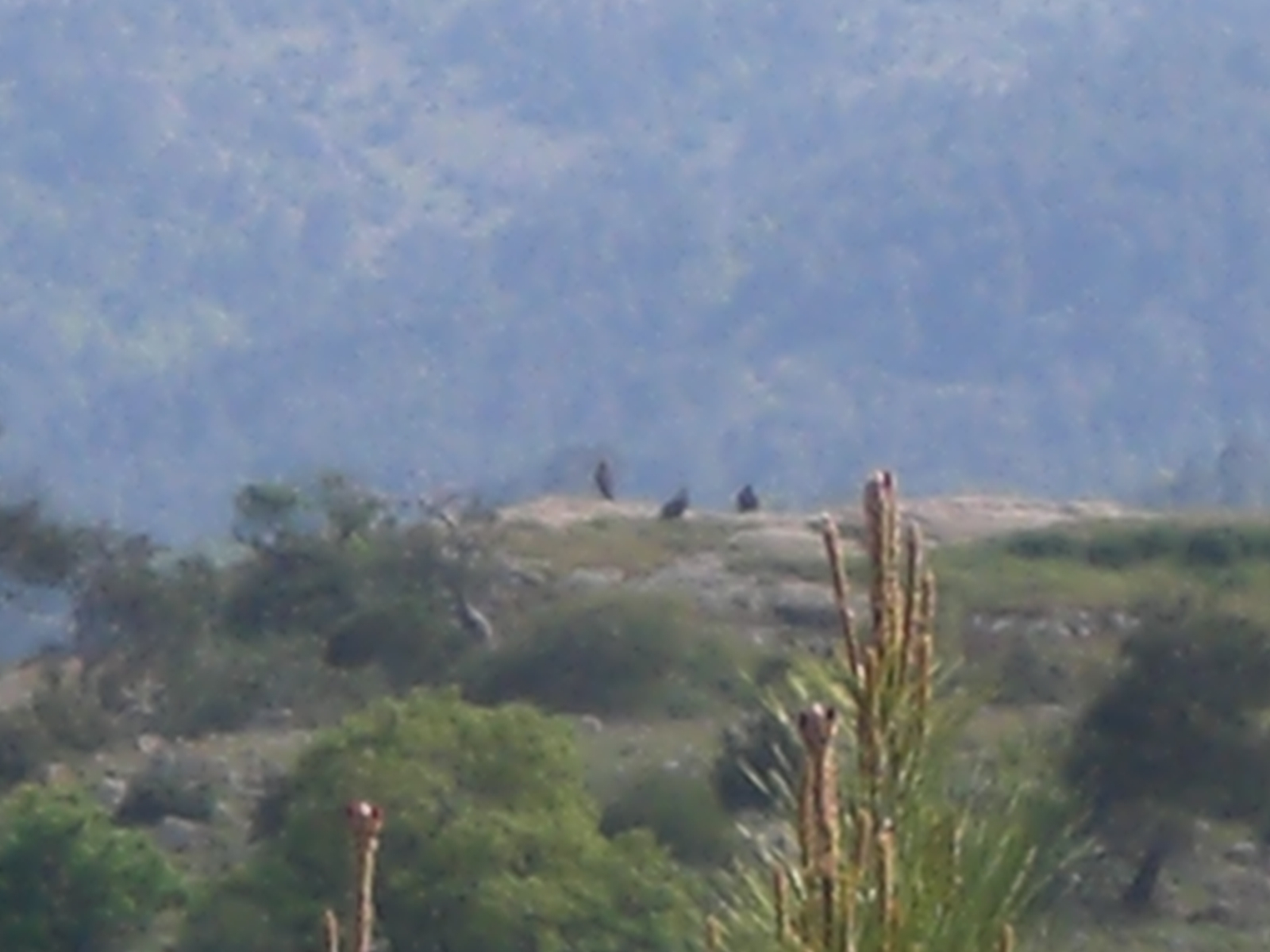
Local birds of prey

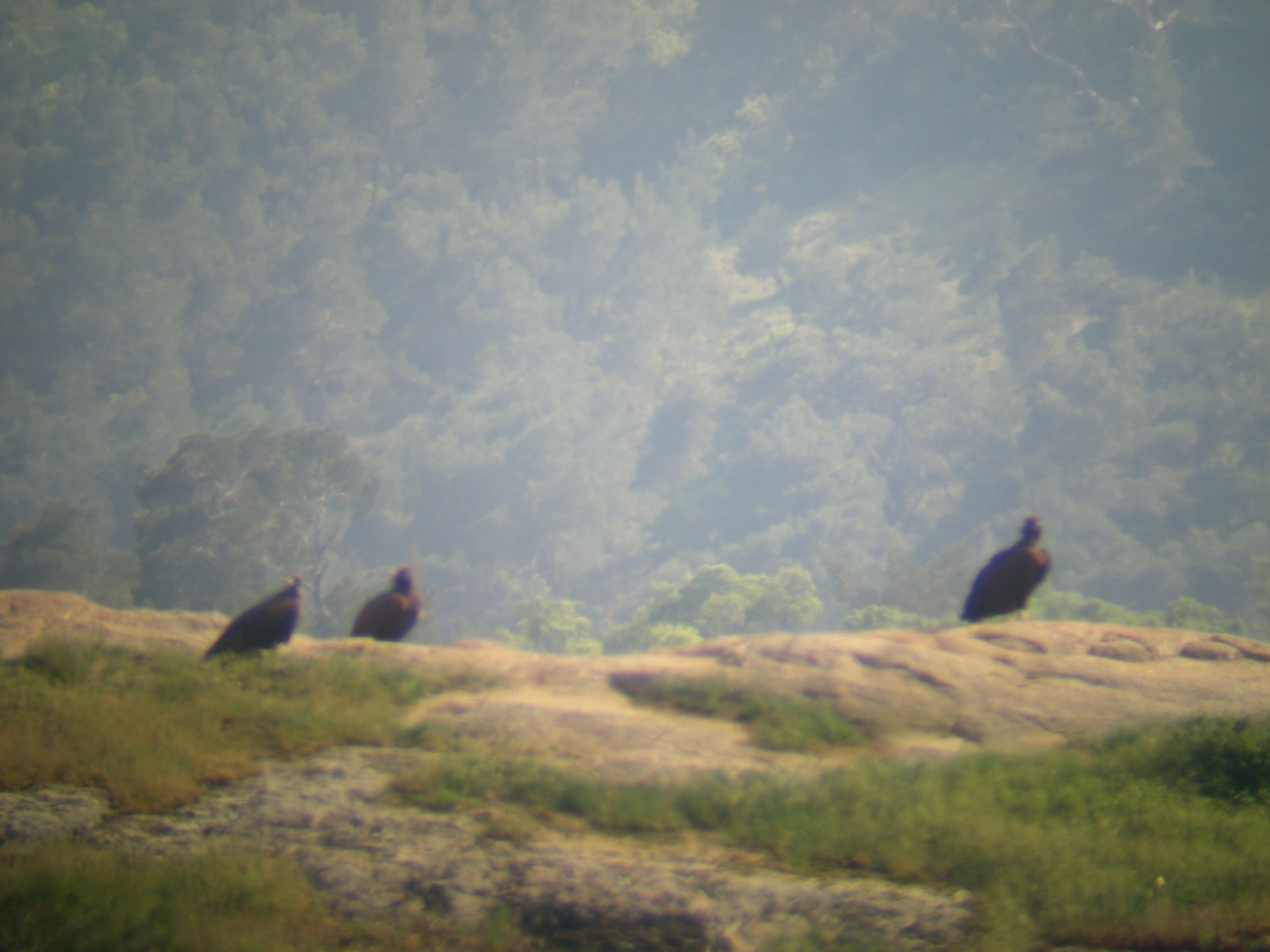
Closer view of local vultures

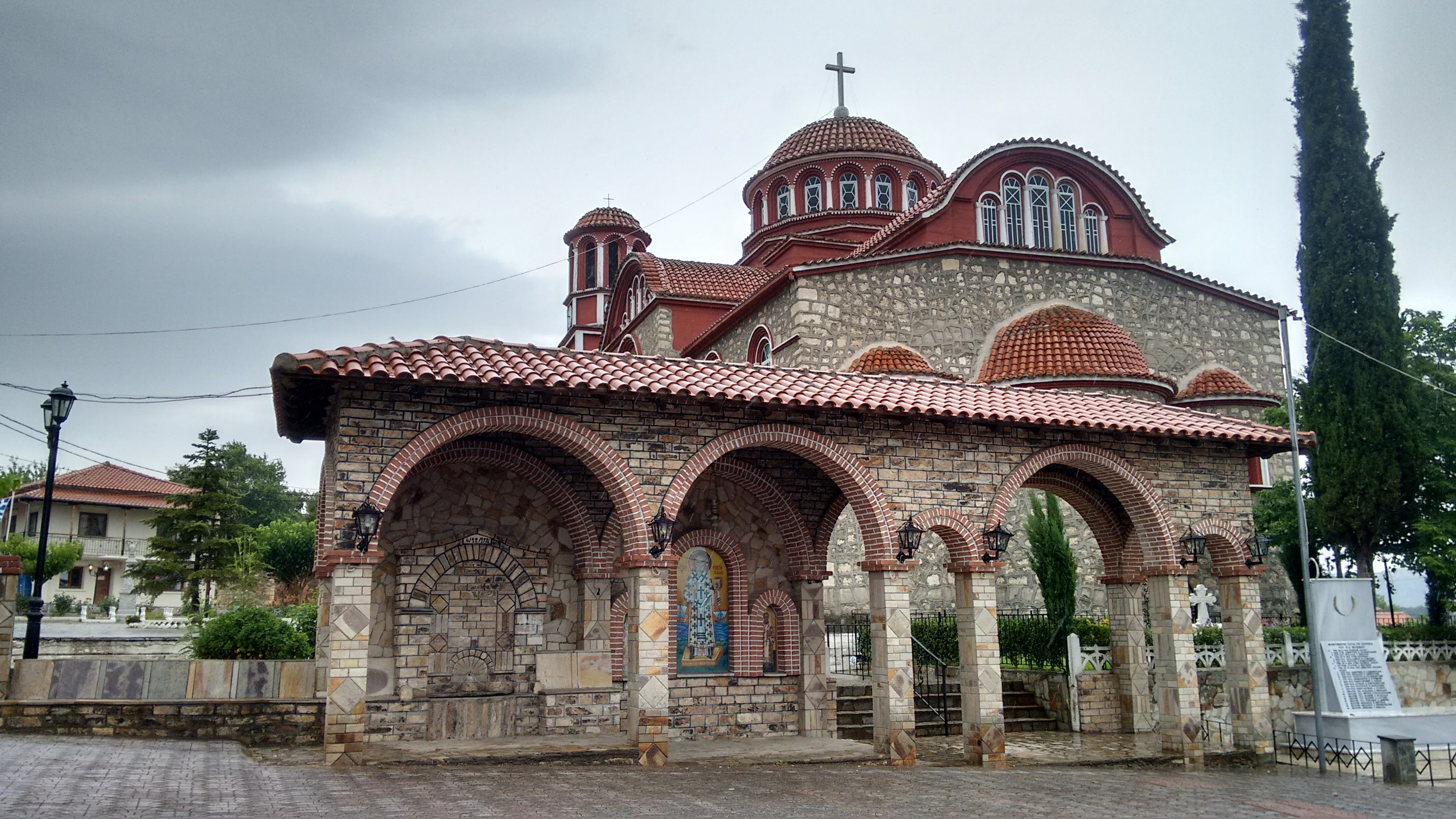
Church of Dadia

== See also ==
- List of settlements in the Evros regional unit
