= List of birds of Greece =

This is a list of the bird species recorded in Greece. The avifauna of Greece included a total of 462 species according to the Hellenic Rarities Committee of the Hellenic Ornithological Society (Ελληνική Ορνιθολογική Εταιρεία). Of them, four have not been recorded since 1950 and 7 have been introduced by humans. This list's taxonomic treatment (designation and sequence of orders, families, and species) and nomenclature (English and scientific names) are those of the Hellenic Ornithological Society.

The following tags have been used to highlight several categories of occurrence. Species without tags are regularly occurring residents, migrants, or seasonal visitors which have been recorded since 1 January 1950.

- (*) Rare in Greece; reports of these 117 species require submission to the Hellenic Rarities Committee for inclusion in the official record.
- (B) Species which have not occurred in Greece since 1 January 1950.
- (C) Species that do not occur naturally in Greece, although breeding populations have been introduced by humans.
- (Ex) Extinct in Greece - a species that no longer occurs in Greece although populations exist elsewhere.

== Pheasants, grouse, and allies ==
Order: Galliformes Family: Phasianidae

The Phasianidae are a family of terrestrial birds. In general, they are plump (although they vary in size) and have broad, relatively short wings.

- Common quail, Coturnix coturnix
- Rock partridge, Alectoris graeca
- Chukar partridge, Alectoris chukar
- Red-legged partridge, Alectoris rufa (C)
- Black francolin, Francolinus francolinus (B Ex)
- Common pheasant, Phasianus colchicus (C)
- Grey partridge, Perdix perdix
- Hazel grouse, Tetrastes bonasia
- Western capercaillie, Tetrao urogallus
- Black grouse, Lyrurus tetrix (*)

== Ducks, geese, and waterfowl ==
Order: Anseriformes Family: Anatidae

Anatidae includes the ducks and most duck-like waterfowl, such as geese and swans. These birds are adapted to an aquatic existence with webbed feet, flattened bills, and feathers that are excellent at shedding water due to an oily coating.

- White-headed duck, Oxyura leucocephala
- Mute swan, Cygnus olor
- Whooper swan, Cygnus cygnus
- Tundra swan, Cygnus columbianus (*)
- Brent goose, Branta bernicla (*)
- Red-breasted goose, Branta ruficollis
- Snow goose, Anser caerulescens (*)
- Greylag goose, Anser anser
- Bean goose, Anser fabalis (*)
- Greater white-fronted goose, Anser albifrons
- Lesser white-fronted goose, Anser erythropus
- Long-tailed duck, Clangula hyemalis
- Common eider, Somateria mollissima (*)
- Velvet scoter, Melanitta fusca
- Common scoter, Melanitta nigra (*)
- Common goldeneye, Bucephala clangula
- Smew, Mergellus albellus
- Goosander, Mergus merganser
- Red-breasted merganser, Mergus serrator
- Common shelduck, Tadorna tadorna
- Ruddy shelduck, Tadorna ferruginea
- Marbled teal, Marmaronetta angustirostris (*)
- Red-crested pochard, Netta rufina
- Common pochard, Aythya ferina
- Ferruginous duck, Aythya nyroca
- Tufted duck, Aythya fuligula
- Greater scaup, Aythya marila
- Garganey, Spatula querquedula
- Northern shoveler, Spatula clypeata
- Blue-winged teal, Spatula discors (*)
- Gadwall, Mareca strepera
- Eurasian wigeon, Mareca penelope
- Mallard, Anas platyrhynchos
- Northern pintail, Anas acuta
- Eurasian teal, Anas crecca

== Grebes ==
Order: Podicipediformes Family: Podicipedidae

Grebes are small to medium-large freshwater diving birds. They have lobed toes and are excellent swimmers and divers. However, they have their feet placed far back on the body, making them quite ungainly on land.

- Little grebe, Tachybaptus ruficollis
- Red-necked grebe, Podiceps grisegena
- Great crested grebe, Podiceps cristatus
- Horned grebe, Podiceps auritus
- Black-necked grebe, Podiceps nigricollis

== Flamingos ==
Order: Phoenicopteriformes Family: Phoenicopteridae

Flamingos are gregarious wading birds, usually 1 to 1.5 metres (3 to 5 ft) tall, found in both the Western and Eastern Hemispheres. Flamingos filter-feed on shellfish and algae. Their oddly shaped beaks are specially adapted to separate mud and silt from the food they consume and, uniquely, are used upside-down.

- Greater flamingo, Phoenicopterus roseus

== Pigeons and doves ==
Order: Columbiformes Family: Columbidae

Pigeons and doves are stout-bodied birds with short necks and short slender bills with a fleshy cere.

- Rock dove, Columba livia
- Stock dove, Columba oenas
- Common wood pigeon, Columba palumbus
- European turtle dove, Streptopelia turtur
- Oriental turtle dove, Streptopelia orientalis (*)
- Eurasian collared dove, Streptopelia decaocto
- Laughing dove, Streptopelia senegalensis (*)

== Sandgrouse ==
Order: Pterocliformes Family: Pteroclidae

Sandgrouse have small, pigeon like heads and necks, but sturdy compact bodies. They have long pointed wings and sometimes tails and a fast direct flight. Flocks fly to watering holes at dawn and dusk. Their legs are feathered down to the toes.

- Pallas's sandgrouse, Syrrhaptes paradoxus (B) (*)
- Black-bellied sandgrouse, Pterocles orientalis (*)
- Pin-tailed sandgrouse, Pterocles alchata (*)

== Nightjars and allies ==
Order: Caprimulgiformes Family: Caprimulgidae

Nightjars are medium-sized nocturnal birds that usually nest on the ground. They have long wings, short legs and very short bills. Most have small feet, of little use for walking, and long pointed wings. Their soft plumage is camouflaged to resemble bark or leaves.

- European nightjar, Caprimulgus europaeus

== Swifts ==
Order: Caprimulgiformes Family: Apodidae

Swifts are small birds which spend the majority of their lives flying. These birds have very short legs and never settle voluntarily on the ground, perching instead only on vertical surfaces. Many swifts have long swept-back wings which resemble a crescent or boomerang.

- Alpine swift, Tachymarptis melba
- Little swift, Apus affinis (*)
- Pallid swift, Apus pallidus
- Common swift, Apus apus

== Cuckoos ==
Order: Cuculiformes Family: Cuculidae

The family Cuculidae includes cuckoos and allies. These birds are of variable size with slender bodies, long tails and strong legs. The Old World cuckoos are brood parasites.

- Great spotted cuckoo, Clamator glandarius
- Common cuckoo, Cuculus canorus

== Rails, gallinules, and coots ==
Order: Gruiformes Family: Rallidae

Rallidae is a large family of small to medium-sized birds which includes the rails, crakes, coots and gallinules. Typically they inhabit dense vegetation in damp environments near lakes, swamps or rivers. In general they are shy and secretive birds, making them difficult to observe. Most species have strong legs and long toes which are well adapted to soft uneven surfaces. They tend to have short, rounded wings and to be weak fliers.

- Water rail, Rallus aquaticus
- Corn crake, Crex crex
- Spotted crake, Porzana porzana
- Little crake, Zapornia parva
- Baillon's crake, Zapornia pusilla
- Western swamphen, Porphyrio porphyrio (*)
- Allen's gallinule, Porphyrio alleni (*)
- Common moorhen, Gallinula chloropus
- Eurasian coot, Fulica atra

== Cranes ==
Order: Gruiformes Family: Gruidae

Cranes are large, long-legged and long-necked birds. Unlike the similar-looking but unrelated herons, cranes fly with necks outstretched, not pulled back. Most have elaborate and noisy courting displays or "dances".

- Demoiselle crane, Anthropoides virgo (*)
- Common crane, Grus grus

== Bustards ==
Order: Otidiformes Family: Otididae

Bustards are large terrestrial birds mainly associated with dry open country and steppes in the Old World. They are omnivorous and nest on the ground. They walk steadily on strong legs and big toes, pecking for food as they go. They have long broad wings with "fingered" wingtips and striking patterns in flight. Many have interesting mating displays.

- Little bustard, Tetrax tetrax (*)
- Great bustard, Otis tarda (*)
- African houbara, Chlamydotis undulata (B) (*)

== Loons ==
Order: Gaviiformes Family: Gaviidae

Loons, known as divers in Europe, are a group of aquatic birds found in many parts of North America and northern Europe. They are the size of a large duck or small goose, which they somewhat resemble when swimming, but to which they are completely unrelated.

- Red-throated diver, Gavia stellata
- Black-throated diver, Gavia arctica
- Great northern diver, Gavia immer (*)

== Northern storm petrels ==
Order: Procellariiformes Family: Hydrobatidae

The northern storm petrels are relatives of the petrels and are the smallest seabirds. They feed on planktonic crustaceans and small fish picked from the surface, typically while hovering. The flight is fluttering and sometimes bat-like.

- European storm petrel, Hydrobates pelagicus (*)

== Shearwaters and petrels ==
Order: Procellariiformes Family: Procellariidae

The procellariids are the main group of medium-sized petrels and shearwaters, characterised by united nostrils with medium septum and a long outer functional primary.

- Scopoli's shearwater, Calonectris diomedea
- Great shearwater, Ardenna gravis (*)
- Yelkouan shearwater, Puffinus yelkouan
- Balearic shearwater, Puffinus mauretanicus (*)

== Storks ==
Order: Ciconiiformes Family: Ciconiidae

Storks are large, long-legged, long-necked, wading birds with long, stout bills. Storks are mute, but bill-clattering is an important mode of communication at the nest. Their nests can be large and may be reused for many years. Many species are migratory.

- Black stork, Ciconia nigra
- White stork, Ciconia ciconia

== Ibises and spoonbills ==
Order: Pelecaniformes Family: Threskiornithidae

Threskiornithidae is a family of large terrestrial and wetland birds which includes the ibises and spoonbills. They have long, broad wings with 11 primary and about 20 secondary feathers. They are strong fliers and despite their size and weight, very capable soarers.

- Eurasian spoonbill, Platalea leucorodia
- Glossy ibis, Plegadis falcinellus

== Herons, egrets, and bitterns ==
Order: Pelecaniformes Family: Ardeidae

The family Ardeidae contains the bitterns, herons and egrets. Herons and egrets are medium to large wading birds with long necks and legs. Bitterns tend to be shorter necked and more wary. Members of Ardeidae fly with their necks retracted, unlike other long-necked birds such as storks, ibises and spoonbills.

- Eurasian bittern, Botaurus stellaris
- Little bittern, Ixobrychus minutus
- Black-crowned night heron, Nycticorax nycticorax
- Striated heron, Butorides striata (*)
- Squacco heron, Ardeola ralloides
- Cattle egret, Bubulcus ibis
- Grey heron, Ardea cinerea
- Purple heron, Ardea purpurea
- Great egret, Ardea alba
- Black heron, Egretta ardesiaca (*)
- Little egret, Egretta garzetta
- Western reef heron, Egretta gularis (*)

== Pelicans ==
Order: Pelecaniformes Family: Pelecanidae

Pelicans are large water birds with a distinctive pouch under their beak. As with other members of the order Pelecaniformes, they have webbed feet with four toes.

- Dalmatian pelican, Pelecanus crispus
- Great white pelican, Pelecanus onocrotalus

== Boobies and gannets ==
Order: Suliformes Family: Sulidae

The sulids comprise the gannets and boobies. Both groups are medium to large coastal seabirds that plunge-dive for fish.

- Northern gannet, Morus bassanus

== Cormorants and shags ==
Order: Suliformes Family: Phalacrocoracidae

Phalacrocoracidae is a family of medium to large coastal, fish-eating seabirds that includes cormorants and shags. Plumage colour varies, with the majority having mainly dark plumage, some species being black-and-white and a few being colourful.

- Pygmy cormorant, Microcarbo pygmeus
- European shag, Gulosus aristotelis
- Great cormorant, Phalacrocorax carbo

== Stone-curlews ==
Order: Charadriiformes Family: Burhinidae

The stone-curlews are a group of largely tropical waders in the family Burhinidae. They are found worldwide within the tropical zone, with some species also breeding in temperate Europe and Australia. They are medium to large waders with strong black or yellow-black bills, large yellow eyes and cryptic plumage. Despite being classed as waders, most species have a preference for arid or semi-arid habitats.

- Eurasian stone-curlew, Burhinus oedicnemus

== Oystercatchers ==
Order: Charadriiformes Family: Haematopodidae

The oystercatchers are large and noisy plover-like birds, with strong bills used for smashing or prising open molluscs.

- Eurasian oystercatcher, Haematopus ostralegus

== Stilts and avocets ==
Order: Charadriiformes Family: Recurvirostridae

Recurvirostridae is a family of large wading birds, which includes the avocets and stilts. The avocets have long legs and long up-curved bills. The stilts have extremely long legs and long, thin, straight bills.

- Pied avocet, Recurvirostra avosetta
- Black-winged stilt, Himantopus himantopus

== Plovers and lapwings ==
Order: Charadriiformes Family: Charadriidae

The family Charadriidae includes the plovers, dotterels and lapwings. They are small to medium-sized birds with compact bodies, short, thick necks and long, usually pointed, wings. They are found in open country worldwide, mostly in habitats near water.

- Grey plover, Pluvialis squatarola
- European golden plover, Pluvialis apricaria
- Pacific golden plover, Pluvialis fulva (*)
- Eurasian dotterel, Charadrius morinellus
- Common ringed plover, Charadrius hiaticula
- Little ringed plover, Charadrius dubius
- Kittlitz's plover, Charadrius pecuarius (*)
- Kentish plover, Charadrius alexandrinus
- Greater sand plover, Charadrius leschenaultii
- Caspian plover, Charadrius asiaticus (*)
- Northern lapwing, Vanellus vanellus
- Spur-winged lapwing, Hoplopterus spinosus
- Sociable lapwing, Vanellus gregarius (*)
- White-tailed lapwing, Vanellus leucurus (*)

== Sandpipers and allies ==
Order: Charadriiformes Family: Scolopacidae

Scolopacidae is a large diverse family of small to medium-sized shorebirds including the sandpipers, curlews, godwits, shanks, woodcocks, snipes, dowitchers and phalaropes. The majority of these species eat small invertebrates picked out of the mud or soil. Variation in length of legs and bills enables multiple species to feed in the same habitat, particularly on the coast, without direct competition for food.

- Upland sandpiper, Bartramia longicauda (*)
- Eurasian whimbrel, Numenius phaeopus
- Slender-billed curlew, Numenius tenuirostris (Ex)
- Eurasian curlew, Numenius arquata
- Bar-tailed godwit, Limosa lapponica
- Black-tailed godwit, Limosa limosa
- Ruddy turnstone, Arenaria interpres
- Red knot, Calidris canutus
- Ruff, Calidris pugnax
- Broad-billed sandpiper, Calidris falcinellus
- Stilt sandpiper, Calidris himantopus (*)
- Curlew sandpiper, Calidris ferruginea
- Temminck's stint, Calidris temminckii
- Sanderling, Calidris alba
- Dunlin, Calidris alpina
- Purple sandpiper, Calidris maritima (*)
- Baird's sandpiper, Calidris bairdii (*)
- Little stint, Calidris minuta
- White-rumped sandpiper, Calidris fuscicollis (*)
- Buff-breasted sandpiper, Calidris subruficollis (*)
- Pectoral sandpiper, Calidris melanotos (*)
- Long-billed dowitcher, Limnodromus scolopaceus (*)
- Eurasian woodcock, Scolopax rusticola
- Great snipe, Gallinago media
- Common snipe, Gallinago gallinago
- Jack snipe, Lymnocryptes minimus
- Wilson's phalarope, Pharalopus tricolor (*)
- Red-necked phalarope, Phalaropus lobatus
- Red phalarope, Phalaropus fulicarius (*)
- Terek sandpiper, Xenus cinereus
- Common sandpiper, Actitis hypoleucos
- Spotted sandpiper, Actitis macularius (*)
- Green sandpiper, Tringa ochropus
- Lesser yellowlegs, Tringa flavipes (*)
- Spotted redshank, Tringa erythropus
- Common greenshank, Tringa nebularia
- Common redshank, Tringa totanus
- Wood sandpiper, Tringa glareola
- Marsh sandpiper, Tringa stagnatilis

== Pratincoles and coursers ==
Order: Charadriiformes Family: Glareolidae

Glareolidae is a family of wading birds comprising the pratincoles, which have short legs, long pointed wings and long forked tails, and the coursers, which have long legs, short wings and long, pointed bills which curve downwards.

- Cream-coloured courser, Cursorius cursor (*)
- Collared pratincole, Glareola pratincola
- Black-winged pratincole, Glareola nordmanni (*)

== Gulls and terns ==
Order: Charadriiformes Family: Laridae

Laridae is a family of medium to large seabirds, the gulls and terns. Gulls are typically grey or white, often with black markings on the head or wings. They have stout, longish bills and webbed feet. Terns are a group of generally medium to large seabirds typically with grey or white plumage, often with black markings on the head. Most terns hunt fish by diving but some pick insects off the surface of fresh water. Both groups are generally long-lived birds, with several species known to live in excess of 30 years.

- Little gull, Hydrocoloeus minutus
- Black-legged kittiwake, Rissa tridactyla
- Slender-billed gull, Chroicocephalus genei
- Black-headed gull, Chroicocephalus ridibundus
- Laughing gull, Leucophaeus atricilla (*)
- Pallas's gull, Ichthyaetus ichthyaetus (*)
- Mediterranean gull, Ichthyaetus melanocephalus
- White-eyed gull, Ichthyaetus leucophthalmus (B) (*)
- Audouin's gull, Ichthyaetus audouinii
- Common gull, Larus canus
- Lesser black-backed gull, Larus fuscus
- European herring gull, Larus argentatus (*)
- Armenian gull, Larus armenicus (*)
- Yellow-legged gull, Larus michahellis
- Caspian gull, Larus cachinnans
- Iceland gull, Larus glaucoides (*)
- Great black-backed gull, Larus marinus (*)
- Bridled tern, Onychoprion anaethetus (*)
- Little tern, Sternula albifrons
- Gull-billed tern, Gelochelidon nilotica
- Caspian tern, Hydroprogne caspia
- Whiskered tern, Chlidonias hybrida
- White-winged tern, Chlidonias leucopterus
- Black tern, Chlidonias niger
- Common tern, Sterna hirundo
- Arctic tern, Sterna paradisaea (*)
- Lesser crested tern, Thalasseus bengalensis (*)
- Sandwich tern, Thalasseus sandvicensis

== Skuas and jaegers ==
Order: Charadriiformes Family: Stercorariidae

The family Stercorariidae are, in general, medium to large birds, typically with grey or brown plumage, often with white markings on the wings. They nest on the ground in temperate and arctic regions and are long-distance migrants.

- Long-tailed skua, Stercorarius longicaudus (*)
- Arctic skua, Stercorarius parasiticus
- Pomarine skua, Stercorarius pomarinus (*)
- Great skua, Stercorarius skua (*)

== Auks, guillemots, and puffins ==
Order: Charadriiformes Family: Alcidae

Alcidae is a family of seabirds which are superficially similar to penguins with their black-and-white colour, their upright posture, and some of their habits, but which can fly.

- Razorbill, Alca torda (*) First record in November-December 2022 following a major irruption into the Mediterranean.

== Barn owls ==
Order: Strigiformes Family: Tytonidae

Barn owls are medium to large owls with large heads and characteristic heart-shaped faces. They have long strong legs with powerful talons.

- Western barn owl, Tyto alba

== Owls ==
Order: Strigiformes Family: Strigidae

The typical owls are small to large solitary nocturnal birds of prey. They have large forward-facing eyes and ears, a hawk-like beak and a conspicuous circle of feathers around each eye called a facial disk.

- Eurasian pygmy owl, Glaucidium passerinum
- Little owl, Athene noctua
- Tengmalm's owl, Aegolius funereus
- Eurasian scops owl, Otus scops
- Long-eared owl, Asio otus
- Short-eared owl, Asio flammeus
- Tawny owl, Strix aluco
- Ural owl, Strix uralensis (*)
- Eurasian eagle-owl, Bubo bubo

== Osprey ==
Order: Accipitriformes Family: Pandionidae

The family Pandionidae contains only one species, the osprey. The osprey is a medium-large raptor which is a specialist fish-eater with a worldwide distribution.

- Osprey, Pandion haliaetus

== Hawks, eagles, and kites ==
Order: Accipitriformes Family: Accipitridae

Accipitridae is a family of birds of prey, which includes hawks, eagles, kites, harriers and Old World vultures. These birds have powerful hooked beaks for tearing flesh from their prey, strong legs, powerful talons and keen eyesight.

- Black-winged kite, Elanus caeruleus (*)
- European honey-buzzard, Pernis apivorus
- Bearded vulture, Gypaetus barbatus
- Egyptian vulture, Neophron percnopterus
- Short-toed snake eagle, Circaetus gallicus
- Griffon vulture, Gyps fulvus
- Eurasian black vulture, Aegypius monachus
- Lesser spotted eagle, Clanga pomarina
- Greater spotted eagle, Clanga clanga
- Steppe eagle, Aquila nipalensis
- Eastern imperial eagle, Aquila heliaca
- Golden eagle, Aquila chrysaetos
- Bonelli's eagle, Aquila fasciata
- Booted eagle, Hieraaetus pennatus
- Western marsh harrier, Circus aeruginosus
- Hen harrier, Circus cyaneus
- Pallid harrier, Circus macrourus
- Montagu's harrier, Circus pygargus
- Levant sparrowhawk, Accipiter brevipes
- Eurasian sparrowhawk, Accipiter nisus
- Eurasian goshawk, Accipiter gentilis
- White-tailed eagle, Haliaeetus albicilla
- Red kite, Milvus milvus
- Black kite, Milvus migrans
- Rough-legged buzzard, Buteo lagopus
- Common buzzard, Buteo buteo
- Long-legged buzzard, Buteo rufinus

== Hoopoes ==
Order: Coraciiformes Family: Upupidae

Hoopoes have black, white and orangey-pink colouring with a large erectile crest on their head.

- Eurasian hoopoe, Upupa epops

== Bee-eaters ==
Order: Coraciiformes Family: Meropidae

The bee-eaters are a group of coraciiform birds in the family Meropidae. Most species are found in Africa but others occur in southern Europe, Madagascar, Australia and New Guinea. They are characterised by richly coloured plumage, slender bodies and usually elongated central tail feathers. All are colourful and have long downturned bills and pointed wings, which give them a swallow-like appearance when seen from afar.

- Asian green bee-eater, Merops orientalis (*)
- Blue-cheeked bee-eater, Merops persicus
- European bee-eater, Merops apiaster

== Rollers ==
Order: Coraciiformes Family: Coraciidae

Rollers resemble crows in size and build, but are more closely related to the kingfishers and bee-eaters. They share the colourful appearance of those groups with blues and browns predominating. The two inner front toes are connected, but the outer toe is not.

- European roller, Coracias garrulus

== Kingfishers ==
Order: Coraciiformes Family: Alcedinidae

Kingfishers are medium-sized birds with large heads, long, pointed bills, short legs and stubby tails.

- Common kingfisher, Alcedo atthis
- Pied kingfisher, Ceryle rudis (*)
- White-throated kingfisher, Halcyon smyrnensis (*)

== Woodpeckers ==
Order: Piciformes Family: Picidae

Woodpeckers are small to medium-sized birds with chisel-like beaks, short legs, stiff tails and long tongues used for capturing insects. Some species have feet with two toes pointing forward and two backward, while several species have only three toes. Many woodpeckers have the habit of tapping noisily on tree trunks with their beaks.

- Eurasian wryneck, Jynx torquilla
- Grey-headed woodpecker, Picus canus
- Eurasian green woodpecker, Picus viridis
- Black woodpecker, Dryocopus martius
- Eurasian three-toed woodpecker, Picoides tridactylus
- Middle spotted woodpecker, Dendrocoptes medius
- Lesser spotted woodpecker, Dryobates minor
- White-backed woodpecker, Dendrocopos leucotos
- Syrian woodpecker, Dendrocopos syriacus
- Great spotted woodpecker, Dendrocopos major

== Falcons and caracaras ==
Order: Falconiformes Family: Falconidae

Falconidae is a family of diurnal birds of prey. They differ from hawks, eagles and kites in that they kill with their beaks instead of their talons.

- Lesser kestrel, Falco naumanni
- Common kestrel, Falco tinnunculus
- Red-footed falcon, Falco vespertinus
- Amur falcon, Falco amurensis (*)
- Eleonora's falcon, Falco eleonorae
- Merlin, Falco columbarius
- Eurasian hobby, Falco subbuteo
- Lanner falcon, Falco biarmicus
- Saker falcon, Falco cherrug
- Peregrine falcon, Falco peregrinus

== Old World parrots ==
Order: Psittaciformes Family: Psittaculidae

Characteristic features of parrots include a strong curved bill, an upright stance, strong legs, and clawed zygodactyl feet. Many parrots are vividly coloured, and some are multi-coloured. In size they range from 8 cm (3.1 in) to 1 m (3.3 ft) in length. Old World parrots are found from Africa east across south and southeast Asia and Oceania to Australia and New Zealand.

- Rose-ringed parakeet, Psittacula krameri (C)

== Old World orioles ==
Order: Passeriformes Family: Oriolidae

The Old World orioles are colourful passerine birds. They are not related to the New World orioles.

- Eurasian golden oriole, Oriolus oriolus

== Shrikes ==
Order: Passeriformes Family: Laniidae

Shrikes are passerine birds known for their habit of catching other birds and small animals and impaling the uneaten portions of their bodies on thorns. A shrike's beak is hooked, like that of a typical bird of prey.

- Red-backed shrike, Lanius collurio
- Red-tailed shrike, Lanius phoenicuroides (*)
- Isabelline shrike, Lanius isabellinus (*)
- Lesser grey shrike, Lanius minor
- Great grey shrike, Lanius excubitor
- Woodchat shrike, Lanius senator
- Masked shrike, Lanius nubicus

== Crows, jays, and magpies ==
Order: Passeriformes Family: Corvidae

The family Corvidae includes crows, ravens, jays, choughs, magpies, treepies, nutcrackers and ground jays. Corvids are above average in size among the Passeriformes, and some of the larger species show high levels of intelligence.

- Red-billed chough, Pyrrhocorax pyrrhocorax
- Yellow-billed chough, Pyrrhocorax graculus
- Eurasian jay, Garrulus glandarius
- Eurasian magpie, Pica pica
- Northern nutcracker, Nucifraga caryocatactes
- Eurasian jackdaw, Corvus monedula
- Rook, Corvus frugilegus
- Carrion crow, Corvus corone
- Common raven, Corvus corax

== Tits, chickadees, and titmice ==
Order: Passeriformes Family: Paridae

The Paridae are mainly small stocky woodland species with short stout bills. Some have crests. They are adaptable birds, with a mixed diet including seeds and insects.

- Coal tit, Periparus ater
- Crested tit, Lophophanes cristatus
- Sombre tit, Poecile lugubris
- Marsh tit, Poecile palustris
- Willow tit, Poecile montanus
- Eurasian blue tit, Cyanistes caeruleus
- Great tit, Parus major

== Penduline tits ==
Order: Passeriformes Family: Remizidae

The penduline tits are a group of small passerine birds related to the true tits. They are insectivores.

- Eurasian penduline tit, Remiz pendulinus

== Larks ==
Order: Passeriformes Family: Alaudidae

Larks are small terrestrial birds with often extravagant songs and display flights. Most larks are fairly dull in appearance. Their food is insects and seeds.

- Dupont's lark, Chersophilus duponti (*)
- Mediterranean short-toed lark, Alaudala rufescens (*)
- Bimaculated lark, Melanocorypha bimaculata (*)
- Calandra lark, Melanocorypha calandra
- Black lark, Melanocorypha yeltoniensis (*)
- Greater short-toed lark, Calandrella brachydactyla
- Horned lark, Eremophila alpestris
- Wood lark, Lullula arborea
- White-winged lark, Alauda leucoptera (*)
- Eurasian skylark, Alauda arvensis
- Crested lark, Galerida cristata

== Bearded reedling ==
Order: Passeriformes Family: Panuridae

This species, the only one in its family, is found in reed beds throughout temperate Europe and Asia.

- Bearded reedling, Panurus biarmicus

== Cisticolas and allies ==
Order: Passeriformes Family: Cisticolidae

The Cisticolidae are warblers found mainly in warmer southern regions of the Old World. They are generally very small birds of drab brown or grey appearance found in open country such as grassland or scrub.

- Zitting cisticola, Cisticola juncidis

== Reed warblers and allies ==
Order: Passeriformes Family: Acrocephalidae

The members of this family are usually rather large for "warblers". Most are rather plain olivaceous brown above with much yellow to beige below. They are usually found in open woodland, reedbeds, or tall grass. The family occurs mostly in southern to western Eurasia and surroundings, but it also ranges far into the Pacific, with some species in Africa.

- Booted warbler, Iduna caligata (*)
- Eastern olivaceous warbler, Iduna pallida
- Western olivaceous warbler, Iduna opaca (*)
- Olive-tree warbler, Hippolais olivetorum
- Melodious warbler, Hippolais polyglotta (*)
- Icterine warbler, Hippolais icterina
- Aquatic warbler, Acrocephalus paludicola (*)
- Moustached warbler, Acrocephalus melanopogon
- Sedge warbler, Acrocephalus schoenobaenus
- Marsh warbler, Acrocephalus palustris
- Eurasian reed warbler, Acrocephalus scirpaceus
- Paddyfield warbler, Acrocephalus agricola (*)
- Great reed warbler, Acrocephalus arundinaceus

== Grassbirds and allies ==
Order: Passeriformes Family: Locustellidae

Locustellidae are a family of small insectivorous songbirds found mainly in Eurasia, Africa, and the Australian region. They are smallish birds with tails that are usually long and pointed, and tend to be drab brownish or buffy all over.

- Savi's warbler, Locustella luscinioides
- River warbler, Locustella fluviatilis
- Common grasshopper warbler, Locustella naevia

== Swallows ==
Order: Passeriformes Family: Hirundinidae

The family Hirundinidae is adapted to aerial feeding. They have a slender streamlined body, long pointed wings and a short bill with a wide gape. The feet are adapted to perching rather than walking, and the front toes are partially joined at the base.

- Western house martin, Delichon urbicum
- European red-rumped swallow, Cecropis rufula
- Barn swallow, Hirundo rustica
- Eurasian crag martin, Ptyonoprogne rupestris
- Sand martin, Riparia riparia

== Leaf warblers ==
Order: Passeriformes Family: Phylloscopidae

Leaf warblers are a family of small insectivorous birds found mostly in Eurasia and ranging into Wallacea and Africa. The species are of various sizes, often green-plumaged above and yellow below, or more subdued with greyish-green to greyish-brown colours.

- Eastern Bonelli's warbler, Phylloscopus orientalis
- Western Bonelli's warbler, Phylloscopus bonelli (*)
- Wood warbler, Phylloscopus sibilatrix
- Yellow-browed warbler, Phylloscopus inornatus (*)
- Hume's leaf warbler, Phylloscopus humei (*)
- Pallas's leaf warbler, Phylloscopus proregulus (*)
- Dusky warbler, Phylloscopus fuscatus (*)
- Willow warbler, Phylloscopus trochilus
- Iberian chiffchaff, Phylloscopus ibericus (*)
- Common chiffchaff, Phylloscopus collybita
- Greenish warbler, Phylloscopus trochiloides (*)
- Green warbler, Phylloscopus nitidus (*)
- Arctic warbler, Phylloscopus borealis (*)

== Bush warblers and allies ==
Order: Passeriformes Family: Cettiidae

The members of this family are found throughout Africa, Asia, and Polynesia. Their taxonomy is in flux, and some authorities place some genera in other families.

- Cetti's warbler, Cettia cetti

== Long-tailed tits ==
Order: Passeriformes Family: Aegithalidae

Long-tailed tits are a group of small passerine birds with medium to long tails. They make woven bag nests in trees. Most eat a mixed diet which includes insects.

- Long-tailed tit, Aegithalos caudatus

== Sylviid warblers and allies ==
Order: Passeriformes Family: Sylviidae

The family Sylviidae is a group of small insectivorous passerine birds. They mainly occur as breeding species, as the common name implies, in Europe, Asia and, to a lesser extent, Africa. Most are of generally undistinguished appearance, but many have distinctive songs.

- Eurasian blackcap, Sylvia atricapilla
- Garden warbler, Sylvia borin
- Barred warbler, Curruca nisoria
- Eastern Orphean warbler, Curruca crassirostris
- Lesser whitethroat, Curruca curruca
- Sardinian warbler, Curruca melanocephala
- Eastern subalpine warbler, Curruca cantillans
- Western subalpine warbler, Curruca iberiae (*)
- Rüppell's warbler, Curruca ruppeli
- Common whitethroat, Curruca communis
- Asian desert warbler, Curruca nana (*)
- Spectacled warbler, Curruca conspicillata (*)
- Marmora's warbler, Curruca sarda (*)
- Dartford warbler, Curruca undata (*)

== Treecreepers ==
Order: Passeriformes Family: Certhiidae

Treecreepers are small woodland birds, brown above and white below. They have thin pointed down-curved bills, which they use to extricate insects from bark. They have stiff tail feathers, like woodpeckers, which they use to support themselves on vertical trees.

- Short-toed treecreeper, Certhia brachydactyla
- Eurasian treecreeper, Certhia familiaris

== Nuthatches ==
Order: Passeriformes Family: Sittidae

Nuthatches are small woodland birds. They have the unusual ability to climb down trees head first, unlike other birds which can only go upwards. Nuthatches have big heads, short tails and powerful bills and feet.

- Eurasian nuthatch, Sitta europaea
- Krüper's nuthatch, Sitta krueperi
- Western rock nuthatch, Sitta neumayer

== Wallcreeper ==
Order: Passeriformes Family: Tichodromidae

The wallcreeper is a small bird related to the nuthatch family, which has stunning crimson, grey and black plumage.

- Wallcreeper, Tichodroma muraria

== Wrens ==
Order: Passeriformes Family: Troglodytidae

The wrens are mainly small and inconspicuous except for their loud songs. These birds have short wings and thin down-turned bills. Several species often hold their tails upright. All are insectivorous.

- Eurasian wren, Troglodytes troglodytes

== Dippers ==
Order: Passeriformes Family: Cinclidae

Dippers are a group of perching birds whose habitat includes aquatic environments in the Americas, Europe and Asia. They are named for their bobbing or dipping movements.

- White-throated dipper, Cinclus cinclus

== Starlings ==
Order: Passeriformes Family: Sturnidae

Starlings are small to medium-sized passerine birds. Their flight is strong and direct and they are very gregarious. Their preferred habitat is fairly open country. They eat insects and fruit. Plumage is typically dark with a metallic sheen.

- Common starling, Sturnus vulgaris
- Spotless starling, Sturnus unicolor (*)
- Rosy starling, Pastor roseus

== Thrushes and allies ==
Order: Passeriformes Family: Turdidae

The thrushes are a group of passerine birds with a near-cosmopolitan distribution. They are plump, soft plumaged, small to medium-sized insectivores or omnivores, often feeding on the ground. Many have attractive songs.

- White's thrush, Zoothera aurea (*)
- Mistle thrush, Turdus viscivorus
- Song thrush, Turdus philomelos
- Redwing, Turdus iliacus
- Eurasian blackbird, Turdus merula
- Fieldfare, Turdus pilaris
- Ring ouzel, Turdus torquatus
- Black-throated thrush, Turdus atrogularis (*)

== Old World flycatchers ==
Order: Passeriformes Family: Muscicapidae

Old World flycatchers are a large group of small passerine birds native to the Old World. They are mainly small arboreal insectivores. The appearance of these birds is highly varied; some have weak songs and harsh calls but others are among the world's finest songsters.

- Rufous-tailed scrub robin, Cercotrichas galactotes
- Asian brown flycatcher, Muscicapa dauurica (*)
- Spotted flycatcher, Muscicapa striata
- European robin, Erithacus rubecula
- Red-flanked bluetail, Tarsiger cyanurus (*)
- White-throated robin, Irania gutturalis (*)
- Bluethroat, Luscinia svecica
- Thrush nightingale, Luscinia luscinia
- Common nightingale, Luscinia megarhynchos
- Red-breasted flycatcher, Ficedula parva
- Semicollared flycatcher, Ficedula semitorquata
- European pied flycatcher, Ficedula hypoleuca
- Collared flycatcher, Ficedula albicollis
- Black redstart, Phoenicurus ochruros
- Common redstart, Phoenicurus phoenicurus
- Moussier's redstart, Phoenicurus moussieri (*)
- Rufous-tailed rock thrush, Monticola saxatilis
- Blue rock thrush, Monticola solitarius
- Whinchat, Saxicola rubetra
- Siberian stonechat, Saxicola maurus (*)
- European stonechat, Saxicola rubicola
- Northern wheatear, Oenanthe oenanthe
- Isabelline wheatear, Oenanthe isabellina
- Hooded wheatear, Oenanthe monacha (*)
- Desert wheatear, Oenanthe deserti (*)
- Eastern black-eared wheatear, Oenanthe melanoleuca
- Pied wheatear, Oenanthe pleschanka
- Black wheatear, Oenanthe leucura (*)
- White-crowned wheatear, Oenanthe leucopyga (*)
- Finsch's wheatear, Oenanthe finschii (*)

== Crests ==
Order: Passeriformes Family: Regulidae

The crests, also called kinglets, are a small group of birds formerly often included in the Old World warblers, but now given family status because they are genetically separated.

- Goldcrest, Regulus regulus
- Common firecrest, Regulus ignicapilla

== Waxwings ==
Order: Passeriformes Family: Bombycillidae

The waxwings are a group of birds with soft silky plumage and unique red tips to some of the wing feathers. In the Bohemian and cedar waxwings, these tips look like sealing wax and give the group its name. These are arboreal birds of northern forests. They live on insects in summer and berries in winter.

- Bohemian waxwing, Bombycilla garrulus

== Accentors ==
Order: Passeriformes Family: Prunellidae

The accentors are in the only bird family, Prunellidae, which is completely endemic to the Palearctic. They are small, fairly drab species superficially similar to sparrows.

- Alpine accentor, Prunella collaris
- Dunnock, Prunella modularis

== Old World sparrows ==
Order: Passeriformes Family: Passeridae

Old World sparrows are small passerine birds. In general, sparrows tend to be small, plump, brown or grey birds with short tails and short powerful beaks. Sparrows are seed eaters, but they also consume small insects.

- House sparrow, Passer domesticus
- Spanish sparrow, Passer hispaniolensis
- Dead Sea sparrow, Passer moabiticus (*)
- Eurasian tree sparrow, Passer montanus
- Pale rockfinch, Carpospiza brachydactyla (*)
- Rock sparrow, Petronia petronia
- White-winged snowfinch, Montifringilla nivalis

== Wagtails and pipits ==
Order: Passeriformes Family: Motacillidae

Motacillidae is a family of small passerine birds with medium to long tails. They include the wagtails, longclaws and pipits. They are slender, ground feeding insectivores of open country.

- Tree pipit, Anthus trivialis
- Red-throated pipit, Anthus cervinus
- Meadow pipit, Anthus pratensis
- Water pipit, Anthus spinoletta
- European rock pipit, Anthus petrosus (*)
- Richard's pipit, Anthus richardi
- Blyth's pipit, Anthus godlewskii (*)
- Tawny pipit, Anthus campestris
- Western yellow wagtail, Motacilla flava
- Grey wagtail, Motacilla cinerea
- Citrine wagtail, Motacilla citreola
- White wagtail, Motacilla alba

== Finches, euphonias, and allies ==
Order: Passeriformes Family: Fringillidae

Finches are seed-eating passerine birds, that are small to moderately large and have a strong beak, usually conical and in some species very large. All have twelve tail feathers and nine primaries. These birds have a bouncing flight with alternating bouts of flapping and gliding on closed wings, and most sing well.

- Common chaffinch, Fringilla coelebs
- Brambling, Fringilla montifringilla
- Hawfinch, Coccothraustes coccothraustes
- Common rosefinch, Carpodacus erythrinus (*)
- Eurasian bullfinch, Pyrrhula pyrrhula
- Trumpeter finch, Bucanetes githagineus (*)
- European greenfinch, Chloris chloris
- Common linnet, Linaria cannabina
- Red crossbill, Loxia curvirostra
- European goldfinch, Carduelis carduelis
- European serin, Serinus serinus
- Red-fronted serin, Serinus pusillus (*)
- Eurasian siskin, Spinus spinus

== Longspurs and snow buntings ==
Order: Passeriformes Family: Calcariidae

The Calcariidae are a group of passerine birds which had been traditionally grouped with the buntings, but differ in a number of respects and are usually found in open grassy areas.

- Snow bunting, Plectrophenax nivalis (*)

== Old World buntings ==
Order: Passeriformes Family: Emberizidae

The buntings are a large family of passerine birds. They are seed-eating birds with distinctively shaped bills. Many buntings have distinctive head patterns.

- Black-headed bunting, Emberiza melanocephala
- Corn bunting, Emberiza calandra
- Rock bunting, Emberiza cia
- Cinereous bunting, Emberiza cineracea
- Ortolan bunting, Emberiza hortulana
- Cretzschmar's bunting, Emberiza caesia
- Cirl bunting, Emberiza cirlus
- Yellowhammer, Emberiza citrinella
- Pine bunting, Emberiza leucocephalos (*)
- Reed bunting, Emberiza schoeniclus
- Yellow-breasted bunting, Emberiza aureola (*)
- Rustic bunting, Emberiza rustica (*)
- Little bunting, Emberiza pusilla (*)

== See also ==
- List of birds
- Lists of birds by region
