= Lake Koroneia =

Lake in Greece

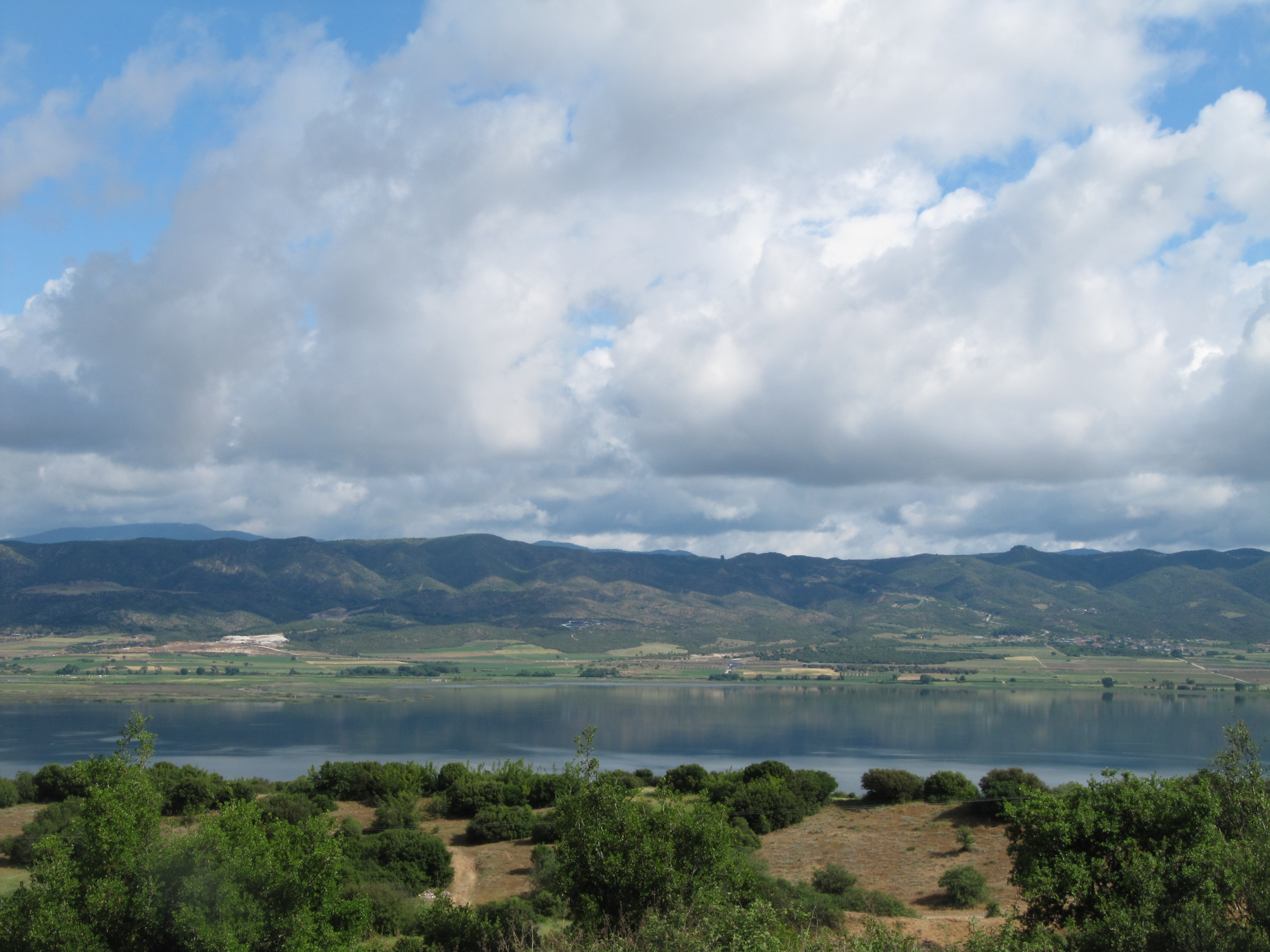
- View of the lake

- Location within Greece
- Coordinates: 40°41′N 23°09′E
- Basin countries: Greece

Ramsar Wetland
- Official name: Lakes Volvi & Koronia
- Designated: 21 August 1975
- Reference no.: 57

Lake Koroneia (Greek: Λίμνη Κορώνεια) is a lake in the heart of the Thessaloniki regional unit in the Mygdonian basin in Greece. It is also known as Lake Agios Vasileios after the village Agios Vasileios and as Lake Langadas after the town Langadas, and is located about 14 kilometres east of Thessaloniki city centre. The A2 motorway (Egnatia Odos) passes along the north side of the lake, and the old Greek National Road 2 passes along the south side. The lake is shared by the municipalities Langadas and Volvi.

A million years ago, Lake Koroneia along with Lake Volvi and all of the Mygdonian basin was a single large lake. Since then, its area has declined and the distance from neighboring Lake Volvi is becoming larger. In the 1950s, Koroneia was among the lakes of Greece with the biggest fish production. In the 1970s, its area was 45 km^{2}, with a depth of about five metres. Since then it has shrunk to about one third of its original area, and its depth has decreased to less than 1 metre. In the summer of 2009, it was possible to walk across the lake. In spite of being a wetland of international importance, as recognized by the Ramsar Convention, the lake suffers from pollution and intensive agriculture. The European Commission has referred Greece to the European Court of Justice for its failure to protect Lake Koroneia.

In 2019, Lake Koroneia's worsening situation drew widespread attention and coverage by the Greek media, with reports for further water level decreases and sights of dead fish on its shores. The Greek government announced that the Ministries responsible for the lake, are working on urgent measures to help prevent the ecological catastrophe and improve the lake's situation. By 2025, the lake's situation had somewhat improved with a rise in the lake's water level from previous years.
