= Prespa National Park (Greece) =

National park in Western Macedonia, Greece

- IUCN category VI (protected area with sustainable use of natural resources)
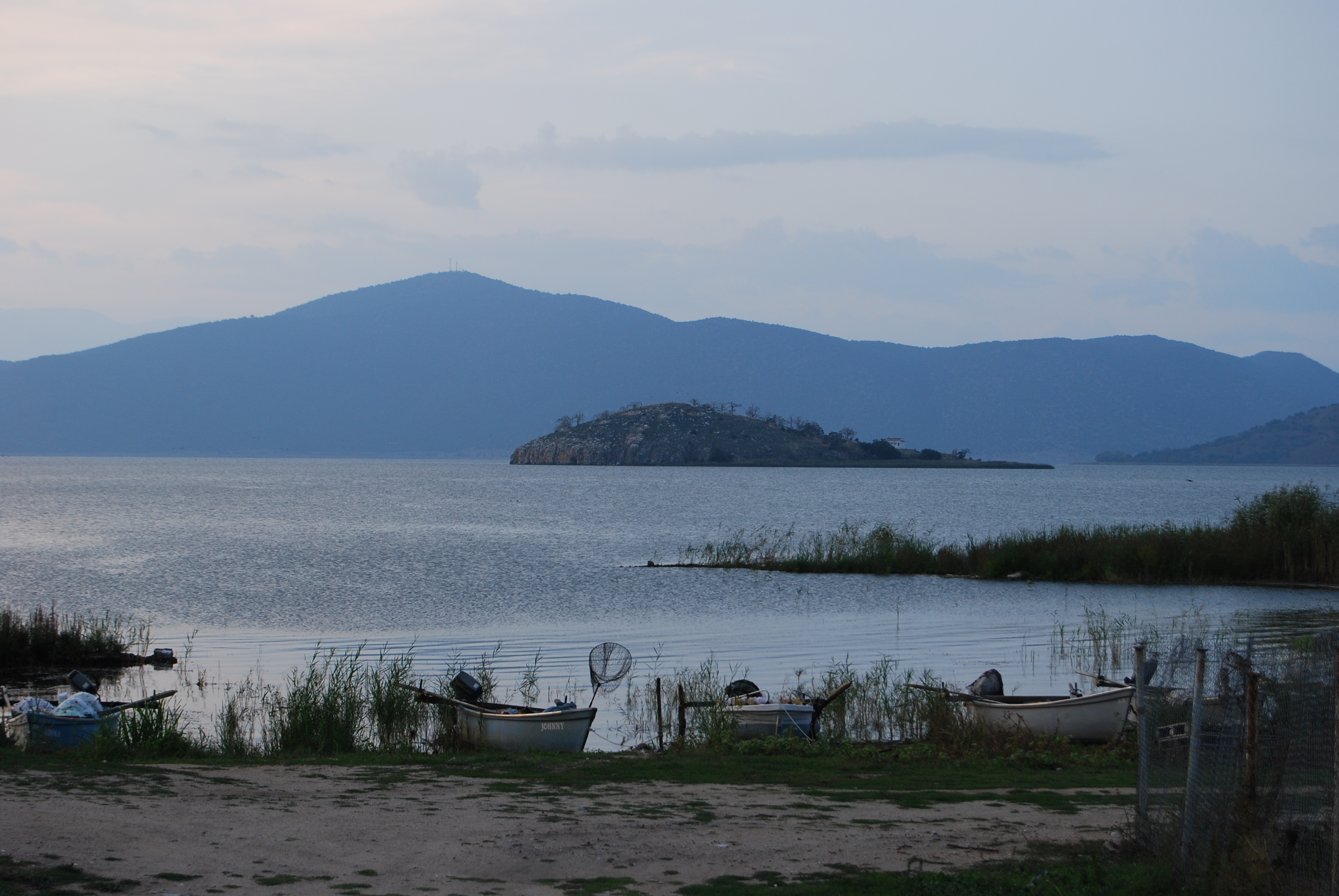
- Small Prespa Lake

- Location within Greece
- Interactive map of Prespa National Park
- Coordinates: 40°46′20″N 21°04′23″E
- Area: 32,700 ha (81,000 acres)
- Established: 1974 (Prespa National Forest); 2009 (Prespa National Park)

Prespa National Park (Greek: Εθνικός Δρυμός Πρεσπών) is a national park in the Western Macedonia region of Greece.

It is one of the national parks surrounding Lake Prespa, encompassing the area around the southeastern part of the lake within Greece, including Small Prespa Lake.

As a wetland area, the park is designated as a Ramsar site. Notable bird species found here include the Dalmatian pelican, great white pelican, great egret, pygmy cormorant, and golden eagle.

The local flora comprises approximately 1,400 species, including the endemic Centaurea prespana.

A visitor center is located in Agios Germanos.

== Gallery ==
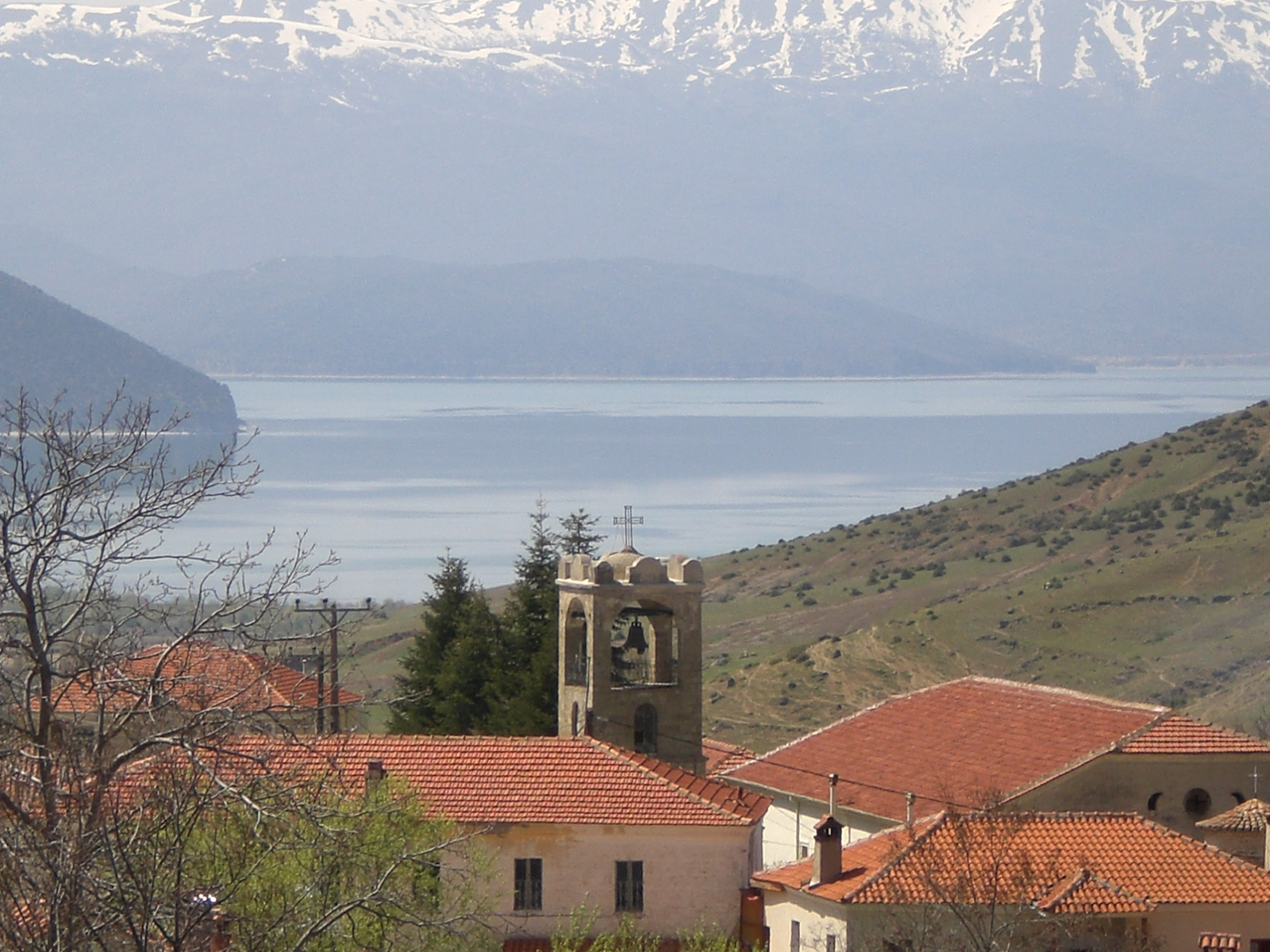
Agios Germanos with Small Prespa Lake in the background
