= List of settlements in Phocis =

This is a list of settlements in Phocis, Greece

== A ==
- Agia Efthymia
- Agioi Pantes
- Agios Georgios
- Agios Konstantinos
- Alpochori
- Amfissa
- Amygdalia
- Ano Polydrosos
- Apostolias
- Artotina
- Athanasios Diakos
- Avoros

== C ==
- Chrisso

== D ==
- Dafnos
- Delphi
- Desfina
- Diakopi
- Dichori
- Doriko
- Drosato
- Drosochori

== E ==
- Efpalio
- Elaia
- Elaionas
- Eptalofos
- Erateini

== F ==
- Filothei

== G ==
- Galaxidi
- Glyfada
- Gravia

== I ==
- Itea

== K ==
- Kalli
- Kallithea
- Kaloskopi
- Kampos
- Karoutes
- Kastellia
- Kastraki
- Kastriotissa
- Kerasies
- Kirra
- Klima
- Kokkino
- Koniakos
- Koupaki
- Kriatsi
- Krokyleio

== L ==
- Lefkaditi
- Lidoriki
- Lilaia
- Livadi

== M ==
- Makrini
- Malamata
- Malandrino
- Managouli
- Marathias
- Mariolata
- Mavrolithari
- Milea
- Monastiraki
- Mousounitsa

== O ==
- Oinochori

== P ==
- Palaioxari
- Panormos
- Panourgia
- Pentagioi
- Pentapoli
- Penteoria
- Perithiotissa
- Perivoli
- Polydrosos
- Potidaneia
- Prosilio
- Pyra
- Pyrgos

== S ==
- Sernikaki
- Sergoula
- Sklithro
- Sotaina
- Stilia
- Stromi
- Sykia

== T ==
- Teichio
- Tolofon
- Trikorfo
- Tristeno
- Tritaia
- Trizonia

== V ==
- Vargiani
- Vounichora
- Vraila

== Y ==
- Ypsilo Chori

== Z ==
- Zorianos

== See also ==
- List of towns and villages in Greece
