= Avoros =

Avoros Άβορος
- Community
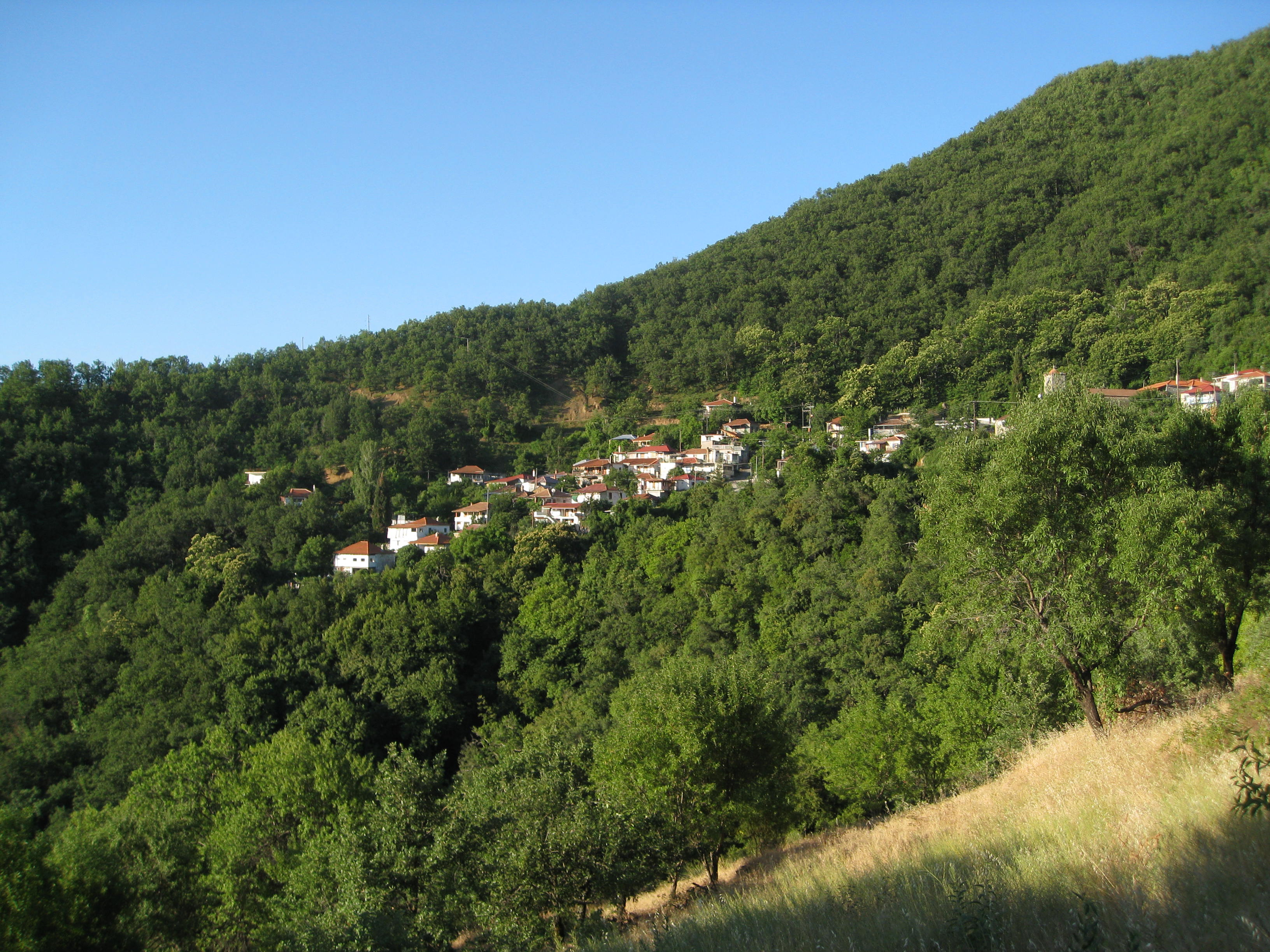
- View of the village from the "Alonia" area

- Location within Greece
- Coordinates: 38°30′N 22°08′E
- Country: Greece
- Administrative region: Central Greece
- Regional unit: Phocis
- Municipality: Dorida
- Municipal unit: Lidoriki

Population (2021)
  - Community: 81
- Time zone: UTC+2 (EET)
  - Summer (DST): UTC+3 (EEST)

Avoros is a village in the Phocis prefecture of Central Greece. At the 2021 census, it had 81 inhabitants.

== Natural environment ==
The village is known for its natural environment and it is built in a dense oak forest. It overlooks the lake of Mornos, a water reservoir that supplies water to Athens, Greece's capital city. The view from the village includes Mount Giona which is Greece's 5th tallest and other mountain ranges.

== Immigration ==
World War II and the Civil War that ensued (1945-1949) created the adverse economic conditions that led to a dramatic demographic decline that occurred in the village in the second half of the 20th century. Many families moved to Athens, Erateini and in urban centers in the United States of America.

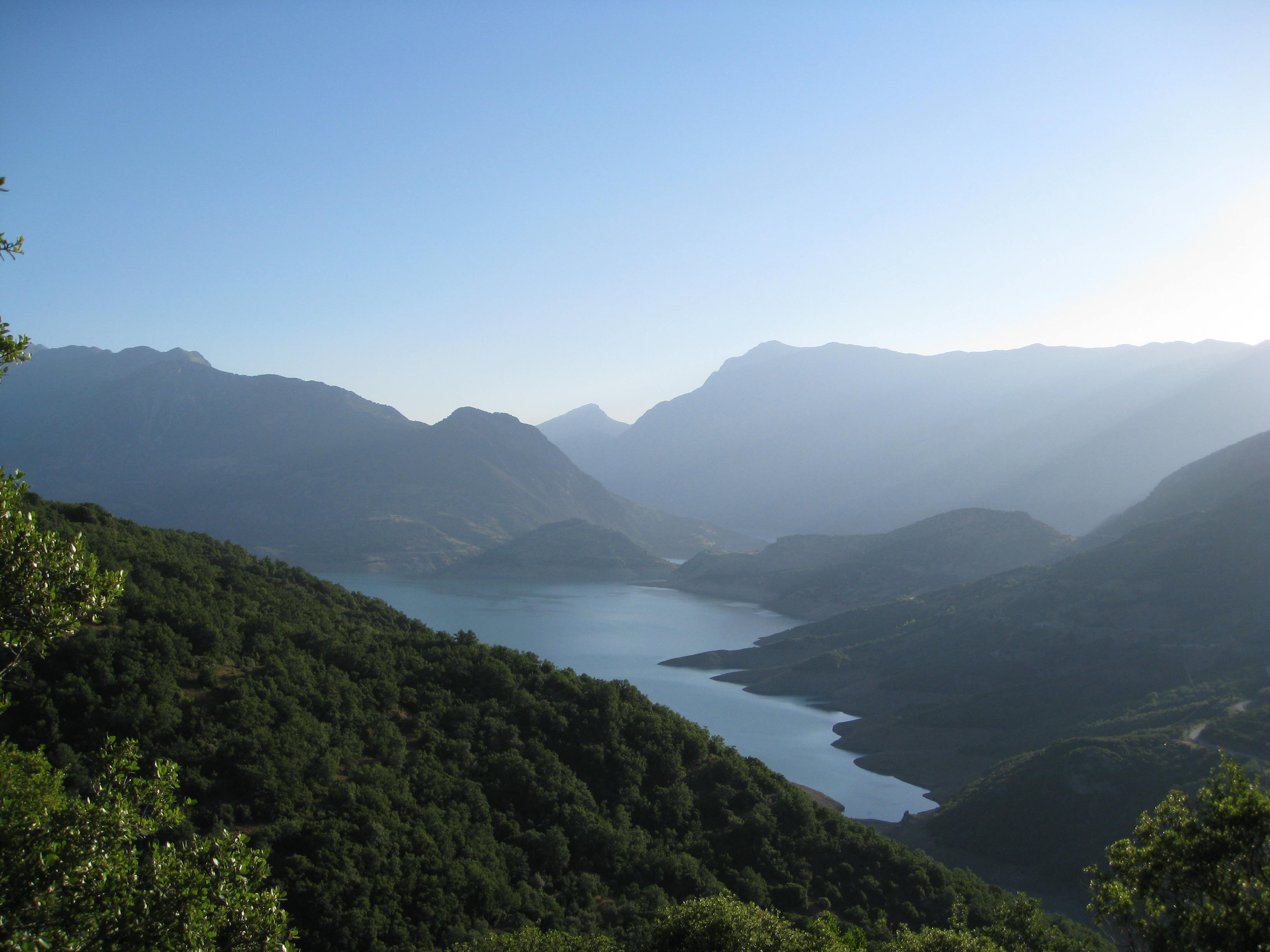
View of Lake Mornos and Mount Giona from the village.
