= Artotina =

Artotina Αρτοτίνα
- Community
- Location within Greece
- Coordinates: 38°42′N 22°02′E
- Country: Greece
- Administrative region: Central Greece
- Regional unit: Phocis
- Municipality: Dorida
- Municipal unit: Vardousia

Population (2021)
  - Community: 145
- Time zone: UTC+2 (EET)
  - Summer (DST): UTC+3 (EEST)
- Vehicle registration: ΑΜ

Artotina (Greek: Αρτοτίνα) is a mountain village in the municipal unit of Vardousia, northwestern Phocis, Greece. It is situated on the western slope of the Vardousia mountains, near the source of the river Evinos, at about 1200 m elevation. Artotina is located 12 km north of Pentagioi and 36 km northwest of Amfissa.

== Population ==
Year	Population
1981	326
1991	285
2001	499
2011	174
2021	145

== History ==
It is claimed that Athanasios Diakos, a Greek national hero of the Greek War of Independence, was born in Artotina, but this is also claimed by the village Athanasios Diakos (formerly Ano Mousounitsa). Other revolutionaries from Artotina were Dimos Skaltsas, Ioannis Roukis, Andritsos Siafakas, Gerantonos and Loukas Kaliakoudas.

== See also ==
- List of settlements in Phocis
