= Erateini =

Eratini Ερατεινή
- Community
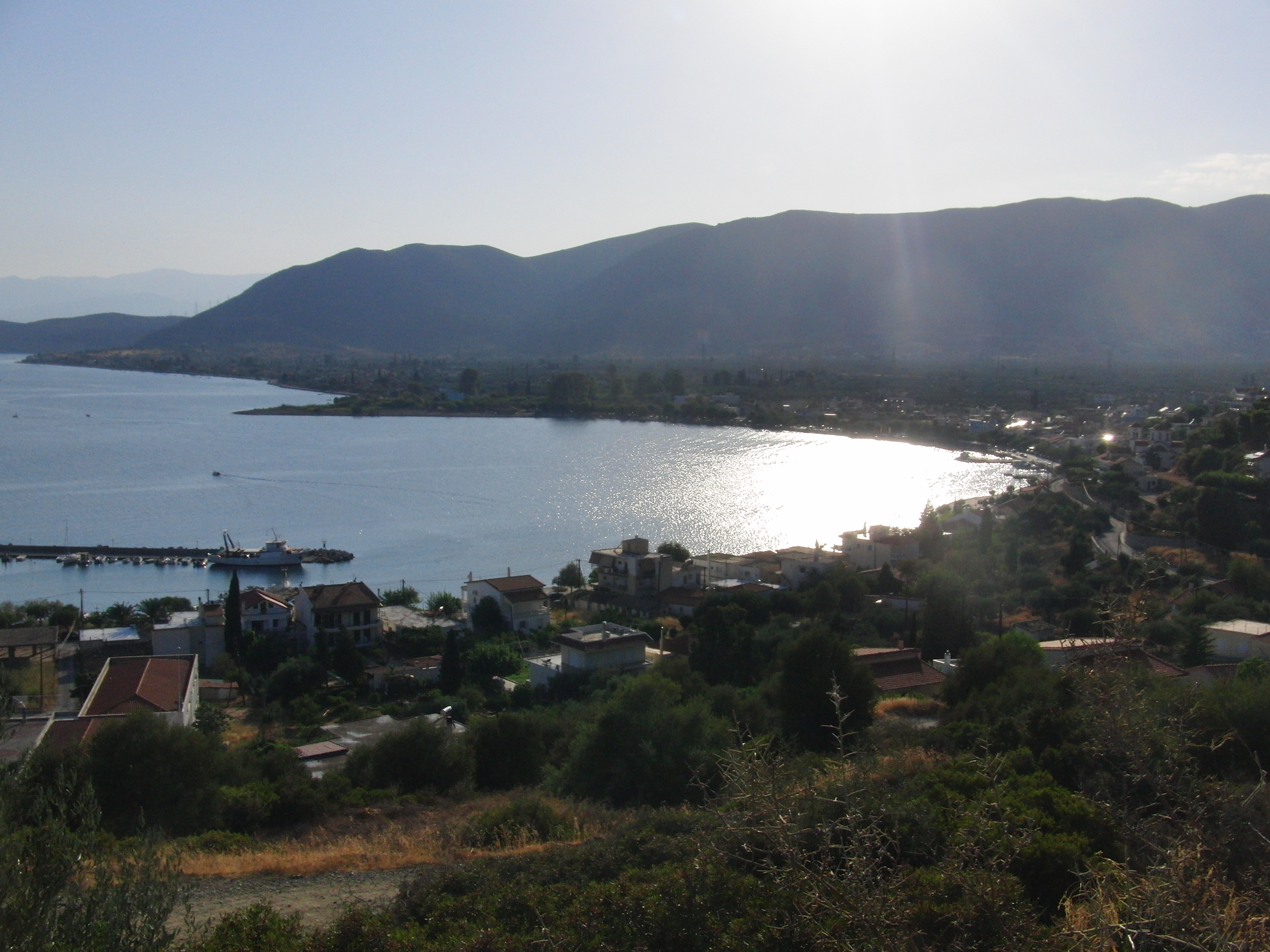

- Location within Greece
- Coordinates: 38°21′35″N 22°13′45″E
- Country: Greece
- Administrative region: Central Greece
- Regional unit: Phocis
- Municipality: Dorida
- Municipal unit: Tolofon

Population (2021)
  - Community: 757
- Time zone: UTC+2 (EET)
  - Summer (DST): UTC+3 (EEST)
- Vehicle registration: ΑΜ

Erateini (Greek: Ερατεινή) is a village in the southern part of Phocis, Greece. It was the municipal seat of the municipality of Tolofon. Erateini is situated on the Gulf of Corinth, 14 km west of Galaxidi, 19 km south of Lidoriki, 23 km southwest of Amfissa and 35 km east of Nafpaktos. The Greek National Road 48 (Antirrio - Nafpaktos - Delphi - Livadeia) passes through the village.

== Population ==
Year	Population
1981	529
1991	572
2001	726
2011	856
2021	757

== History ==
The Primary School of Erateini was established around 1930 and it was provided with a new building in 1955. The Erateini Kindergarten was created in 1979. A year later, in 1980, the Erateini High School was established.

In 1936 Erateini was connected to the electricity grid.

In 1995 the village was significantly affected by the Aigio earthquake.

== See also ==
- List of settlements in Phocis
