= Panormos, Phocis =

Village in Phocis, Greece

Panormos Πάνορμος
- Community
- Location within Greece
- Coordinates: 38°22′23″N 22°14′56″E
- Country: Greece
- Administrative region: Central Greece
- Regional unit: Phocis
- Municipality: Dorida
- Municipal unit: Tolofon

Population (2021)
  - Community: 161
- Time zone: UTC+2 (EET)
  - Summer (DST): UTC+3 (EEST)

Panormos (Greek: Πάνορμος, before 1928: Κίσσελη - Kisseli) is a village and a community of the municipality of Dorida in the prefecture of Phocis, Greece, built at an altitude of 90 meters. The population of the community, which includes the village Ormos Lemonias, was 161 at the 2021 census.

== Archaeological remains ==
The architectural remains on the slopes of Mt. Profitis Ilias at the settlement of Panormos are identified with the ancient Phaestino, a town of west Locris where the important sanctuary of Apollo in Phaestino was situated. Important finds from the broader region attest to the importance of the site in antiquity: a rich classical burial in Pithos, found at Lousa; an ancient defense tower to the northwest of the village; and a considerable number of manumission inscriptions, according to which a slave was "sold" to the god within the precinct of the temple of Apollo. This "sale" of slaves in the presence of witnesses was a widespread practice of manumitting in Central Greece, and particularly in Delphi.
