= Kallithea, Phocis =

Kallithea Καλλιθέα
- Community
- Location within Greece
- Coordinates: 38°21′N 22°10′E
- Country: Greece
- Administrative region: Central Greece
- Regional unit: Phocis
- Municipality: Dorida
- Municipal unit: Tolofon

Population (2021)
  - Community: 286
- Time zone: UTC+2 (EET)
  - Summer (DST): UTC+3 (EEST)
- Vehicle registration: ΑΜ

Kallithea (Greek: Καλλιθέα) is a village and a community in the municipal unit of Tolofon, southern Phocis, Greece. The community consists of the villages Kallithea, Agia Eirini, Agios Nikolaos, Agios Spyridonas, Klovinos, Flampourakia and the uninhabited islands Agios Nikolaos and Prasoudi. Kallithea is situated in the mountains near the coast of the Gulf of Corinth. The two largest villages, Agios Nikolaos and Agios Spyridonas, are on the coast. Kallithea is 5 km northwest of Tolofon, 26 km southwest of Amfissa and 27 km east of Nafpaktos. The Greek National Road 48 (Nafpaktos - Delphi - Livadeia) passes along the coast. There is a ferry service from Agios Nikolaos to Aigio, Peloponnese.

== Population ==
Year	Population village	Population community
1991	40	-
2001	56	359
2011	17	272
2021	20	286

== See also ==
- List of settlements in Phocis
