= Glyfada, Phocis =

Glyfada Γλυφάδα
- Community
- Location within Greece
- Coordinates: 38.381°N 22.077°E
- Country: Greece
- Administrative region: Central Greece
- Regional unit: Phocis
- Municipality: Dorida
- Municipal unit: Tolofon

Population (2021)
  - Community: 420
- Time zone: UTC+2 (EET)
  - Summer (DST): UTC+3 (EEST)
- Vehicle registration: ΑΜ

Glyfada (Greek: Γλυφάδα) is a seaside village of Phocis, Greece, administratively linked to the municipality of Dorida and built on the plain and on the foothill of Paliokastro, opposite to the small island Trizonia. It is situated at a distance of 23 km from the city of Nafpaktos and 45 km from Galaxidi. On the hilltop there have been discovered remains of an ancient acropolis with walls, subterranean cisterns and parts of a temple. On a lower level are traces of the ancient necropolis.

Glyfada is a relatively recent settlement, as most inhabitants settled there in the beginning of the 1950s, coming from the mountain village Dafnochori (former Marazias), located to the north of Glyfada at an altitude of 905 meters.

The name Glyfada comes from a fountain in this region, emanating brackish water, which flows into the sea close to the village's square. The inhabitants work as farmers, fishermen or herdsmen and especially with masonry. In the main square is situated the main church, dedicated to the Dormition of Mary. Administratively, Glyfada was an independent community until 1997. Between 1997 and 2011 it belonged to the municipality of Tolofon. From 2011 it is situated within the municipality of Dorida.

== Archaeology ==
On the hill Paliokastro is located an ancient fortification, dating to the end of the 4th or beginning of the 3rd century B.C. Within this—so far unidentified–town of western Locris one sees precincts erected on natural terraces and several remains of buildings, of which some were of a public or religious character. Among them stands out a built cistern of relatively large dimensions. Outside of the fortification, particularly above the present-day settlement of Glyfa, is located the ancient city. To the northeast of the hill have been traced several remains of the Hellenistic period. In the region connecting Palaiokastro with the modern national road between Naupaktos and Itea was located the necropolis, of which some tombs are visible today. In the region was worshipped the goddess Vasileia, as attested by an ancient inscription found in Glyfa. Several views have been expressed regarding the town's identity: others identify it as ancient Anticyra, others with Oeantheia and others with Hyaeon polis, but none of these theories has so far been verified.

== Cultural life ==
In the summertime several cultural and athletic events take place in the village, particularly around the 15th of August. In the village function a maritime shelter, a public primary school, a medical station, a pharmacy and a center for the citizens' service. Glyfada has a homonymous football team as well.
