= Diakopi =

Village of Phocis, Greece

Diakopi Διακόπι
- Community
- Location within Greece
- Coordinates: 38°35′46″N 22°07′16″E
- Country: Greece
- Administrative region: Central Greece
- Regional unit: Phocis
- Municipality: Dorida
- Municipal unit: Lidoriki

Population (2021)
  - Community: 220
- Time zone: UTC+2 (EET)
  - Summer (DST): UTC+3 (EEST)

Diakopi (Greek: Διακόπι) is a village located in the Vardousia Mountains in Phocis, Greece. Until 1927, it was officially known as Granitsa (Γρανίτσα), a name that is still commonly used.
