= Zorianos =

Zorianos Ζοριάνος
- Community
- Location within Greece
- Coordinates: 38°33.5′N 22°01.5′E
- Country: Greece
- Administrative region: Central Greece
- Regional unit: Phocis
- Municipality: Dorida
- Municipal unit: Vardousia

Population (2021)
  - Community: 120
- Time zone: UTC+2 (EET)
  - Summer (DST): UTC+3 (EEST)
- Vehicle registration: ΑΜ

Zorianos (Greek: Ζοριάνος) is a mountain village in the municipal unit of Vardousia, northwestern Phocis, Greece. It is situated on a forested mountainside near the border with Aetolia-Acarnania, 31 km west of Amfissa.

== Population ==
Year	Population
1981	169
1991	201
2001	195
2011	153
2021	120

== See also ==
- List of settlements in Phocis
