= Athanasios Diakos, Greece =

Village in Kallieis, Phocis, Greece

Athanasios Diakos Αθανάσιος Διάκος
- Community
- Bust of Athanasios Diakos in the village

- Location within Greece
- Coordinates: 38°42′N 22°11′E
- Country: Greece
- Administrative region: Central Greece
- Regional unit: Phocis
- Municipality: Delphi
- Municipal unit: Kallieis

Population (2021)
  - Community: 272
- Time zone: UTC+2 (EET)
  - Summer (DST): UTC+3 (EEST)
- Vehicle registration: ΑΜ

Athanasios Diakos (Greek: Αθανάσιος Διάκος, before 1958: Άνω Μουσουνίτσα - Ano Mousounitsa) is a small village in the municipal unit of Kallieis, Phocis, Greece. It was named after the Greek national hero Athanasios Diakos. He may have been born there as well, but this is disputed by the village Artotina. The village is situated on the eastern slope of the Vardousia mountains, above the upper valley of the river Mornos, at about 1000 m elevation. It is the largest village in the municipal unit. It is 2 km northwest of Mousounitsa, 12 km east of Artotina and 26 km northwest of Amfissa.

== Population ==
Year	Population
1981	135
1991	308
2001	307
2011	518
2021	272

== See also ==
- List of settlements in Phocis
