= Koupaki, Phocis =

Greek village

Koupaki Κουπάκι
- Community
- Location within Greece
- Coordinates: 38°32′N 22°02′E
- Country: Greece
- Administrative region: Central Greece
- Regional unit: Phocis
- Municipality: Dorida
- Municipal unit: Vardousia

Population (2021)
  - Community: 48
- Time zone: UTC+2 (EET)
  - Summer (DST): UTC+3 (EEST)
- Vehicle registration: ΑΜ

Koupaki or Koupakio (Greek: Κουπάκι or Κουπάκιον) is a Greek village in the municipal unit of Vardousia, in northwestern Phocis, west of the Mornos dam and 5 km from Krokyleio, the former seat of Vardousia. The population was 48 in the 2021 census.

== Geography ==
The village lies at over 830 metres (2,720 ft) altitude.

== History ==
Koupaki is referred to as a distinct community for the first time around 1800 by the French Historian and traveler Charles Pouqueville, who refers to the village as Copaki.

Towards the end of the 19th century and the beginning of the 20th, a large number of young men from Koupaki headed for the New World. Many of them worked in building the railway network in America.

== Book ==
The village is featured in the book "Better Dead Than Divorced: The Trial of Panayota" by Lukas Thanasis Konandreas which describes the murder of his father's cousin Panayota Nitsos by her abusive husband in the 1950s and her family's efforts to bring the murderers to justice. The book won the 2015 Bronze Nonfiction Book Award.

== Population ==
Historical population

Year	Pop.	±%
1879	335	—
1896	390	+16.4%
1907	332	−14.9%
1920	358	+7.8%
1928	355	−0.8%
1940	329	−7.3%
1951	187	−43.2%

Year	Pop.	±%
1961	105	−43.9%
1971	51	−51.4%
1981	93	+82.4%
2001	22	−76.3%
2011	65	+195.5%
2021	48	−26.2%

Source: Population censuses
