= Aristomedon =

Aristomedon (Ancient Greek: Ἀριστομέδων) was the name of a number of people of ancient Greece:

- Aristomedon, an Argive sculptor, who lived shortly before the Persian wars. The geographer Pausanias relates that he made some statues dedicated by the Phocians at Delphi, to commemorate their victory over the Thessalians. This work apparently showed the Phocian generals surrounded by Apollo, the seer Tellias, and other leaders of their country, so presumably was a large group of bronze statues. There is also some inscription evidence of these statues, but it is unclear if Pausanias ever actually saw them in person.
- Aristomedon, a man who fathered two daughters who died on the island of Leukas, known to us from well preserved grave stelae found in that place dating from the third century BCE.
