= Vardousia =

Mountain in Greece

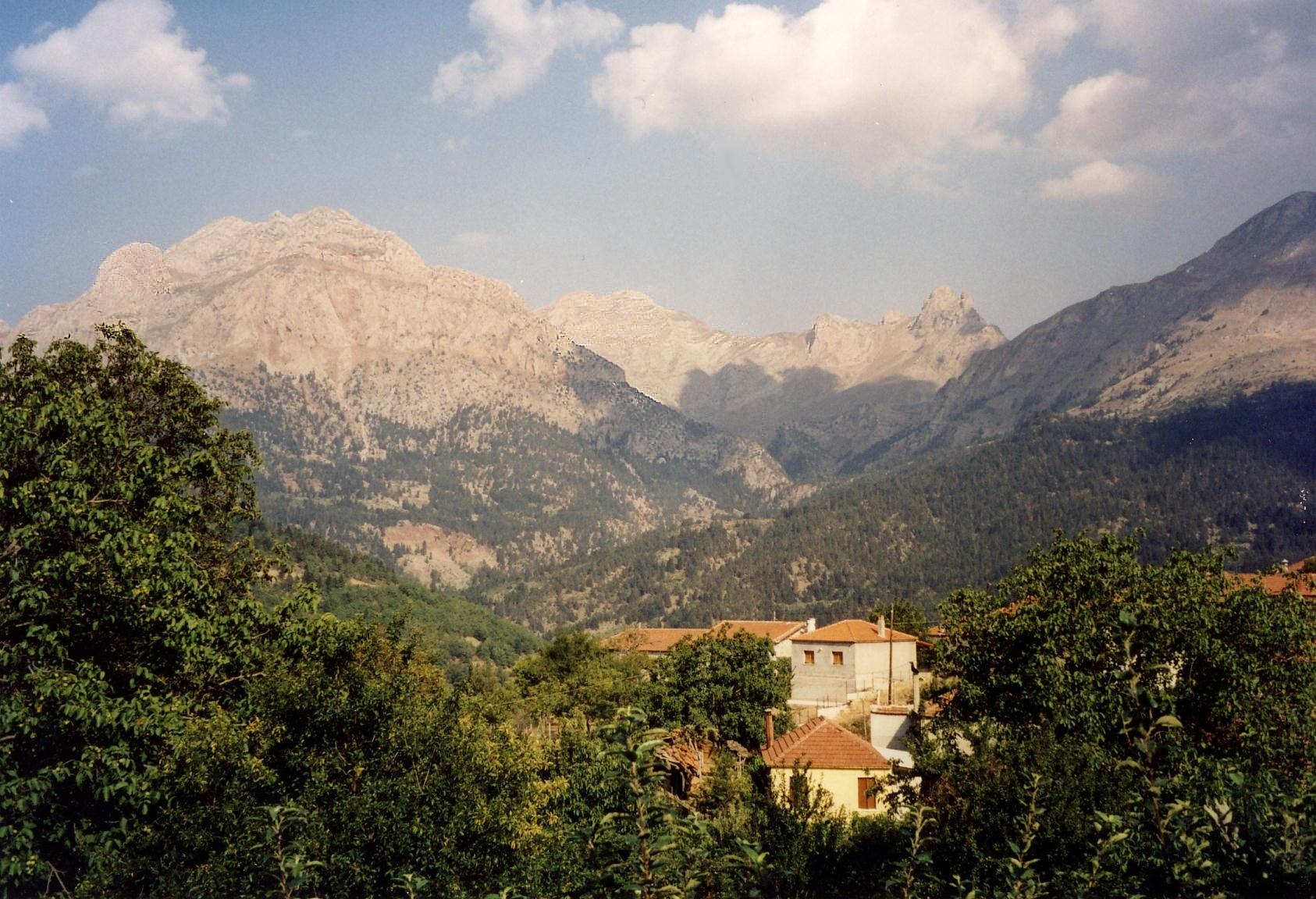
- Mount Vardousia with the peak of Korakas, seen from the west

Highest point
- Elevation: 2,495 m (8,186 ft)
- Prominence: 1,287 m (4,222 ft)
- Listing: Ribu
- Coordinates: 38°40′52″N 22°08′33″E

Naming
- Pronunciation: Greek: [varˈðusia]

Geography
- Location within Greece
- Location: Phocis and Phthiotis, Greece

Vardousia (Greek: Βαρδούσια) is a mountain in northwestern Phocis and southwestern Phthiotis, Greece. Its highest peak, Korakas (Greek: Κόρακας; also known as Korax) reaches 2,495 m (8,186 ft) above sea level, making it the second-tallest summit in Central Greece after Giona. It is a southern extension of the Pindus mountains. It is divided into three main parts: Northern Vardousia, whose highest peak is Sinani at 2,059 metres (6,755 feet), the very steep Western Vardousia, whose highest peak is Soufles at 2,300 metres (7,500 feet), and Southern Vardousia, with the highest peak of Korakas. The whole range measures about 25 kilometres (16 miles) from north to south.

The Vardousia is drained by tributaries of the river Spercheios to the north, the Mornos to the east and south, and the Evinos to the west. The Panaitoliko mountains are to the west, Tymfristos to the northwest, Oeta to the east and Giona to the southeast.

== Flora ==
Vardousia is home to approximately 1,200 plant species, of which 110 are endemic to Greece and four are local endemics. The Mediterranean maquis dominates the lower altitudes, transitioning into mixed forests of oak, elm, and sweet chestnut at higher elevations. Fir forests, mainly composed of Greek and Bulgarian firs, cover over 40% of the mountain's area. Beyond 1,700 meters, the flora shifts to alpine vegetation. Some notable endemic species include ''Achillea barbeyana'' and ''Alyssum nebrodense subsp. tenuicaule''. Additionally, the mountain boasts a wide range of rare plants such as ''Astragalus hellenicus'', ''Cirsium heldreichii'', and ''Fritillaria thessala subsp. thessala''.

== Avifauna ==
The birdlife of Vardousia is rich and varied, especially among birds of prey. Species such as golden eagles, short-toed snake eagles, and common buzzards nest in the cliffs. Until recently, the area supported populations of bearded vultures and griffon vultures. In the alpine meadows and peaks, species like horned larks and white-winged snowfinches can be found, while other notable birds include rock partridges, black woodpeckers, and alpine swifts.

== Amphibians and Reptiles ==
Vardousia's amphibians include species such as alpine newts, fire salamanders, and Greek stream frogs. The mountain is also rich in reptiles, with species such as Hermann’s tortoises, Balkan green lizards, and various snakes like the long-nosed viper. The diversity of habitats from lowland rivers to high alpine meadows provides a home for both amphibians and reptiles, enriching the ecosystem’s complexity. Overall, Vardousia Mountain is a biodiversity hotspot that supports a variety of plant and animal species, many of which are rare or endemic to the region.

== Municipality ==
The municipal unit Vardousia, named after the mountain, covers the western part of the mountain, and includes the villages Artotina and Dichori. The municipal unit Lidoriki covers the southern part, and includes the villages Dafnos, Diakopi, Kallio and Koniakos. The village Athanasios Diakos lies in the east, and Anatoli and Dafni in the north.
