= Sergoula =

Sergoula Σεργούλα
- Community
- Location within Greece
- Coordinates: 38°24′N 22°3′E
- Country: Greece
- Administrative region: Central Greece
- Regional unit: Phocis
- Municipality: Dorida
- Municipal unit: Efpalio

Population (2021)
  - Community: 310
- Time zone: UTC+2 (EET)
  - Summer (DST): UTC+3 (EEST)
- Vehicle registration: ΑΜ

Sergoula (Greek: Σεργούλα) is a settlement and a community of the municipality of Dorida, Phocis in Greece. The community Sergoula consists of three villages: Sergoula, Paralia Sergoulas ("Sergoula Beach") and Palaiochori. Sergoula was established around 17th century, and its original name was Miloi (Greek: Μύλοι=Mills). Sergoula was an independent community between 1912 and 1997, when it became part of the municipality Efpalio. The village Paralia Sergoulas is situated on the Gulf of Corinth coast, below the mountain village Sergoula. The Greek National Road 48 (Delphi - Nafpaktos) passes through Paralia Sergoulas.

== Historical population ==
Year	Population village	Population community
1981	-	583
2001	78	368
2011	50	367
2021	32	310

== Other ==
Paralia Sergoulas has a road parallel to the seaside, built by the military MOMA construction group during the junta dictatorship. All the houses of the village provide access to the central road. This road leads to the nearby villages of Glyfada, Hania and Spilia (belonging to the Municipality of Tolofon), and is connected with the National Route above the village through the Gourgouleti Street, the only officially named street of the village. Prior to the construction of the National Route and the seaside road during the junta, the village was not as accessible as today and cars could not enter the village.As travel guides mention, Sergoula Beach houses are mostly traditional cottages and viewed from above they resemble mushrooms in a sea of green. The older houses are made by stone and clay and can be found on the seaside road. The most notable house used to be a residence of the former noble family and Greek MP Mr.Lidorikis, now owned by the Lemonis family. The former Lidorikis (now Lemonis) house is situated in the eastern corner of the village near the historical stone-built hydragogeon and mill and by the stream Halikias. The historical Hydragogeon and mill is the only historical construction in Sergoula being considered a monument and protected by Greek law. It was built by the Papapolitis noble family in 1911 and used to bring water to the mill, so the farmers could make bread. The big land property stretching from the hydragogeon to the Ambelaki coast was inherited by the Lidorikis family, Mr. Lidorikis became an MP with the support and votes of locals. During the 1990s he started selling his farm and fortune, and as a result, the eastern part of Sergoula Beach was built and a new neighbourhood emerged. Finally, he donated a big piece of land to the municipality, where the new church and a basketball court were built. This land was proclaimed a park and Sergoula Beach residents hold their annual Agia Sofia (September 17) and Agia Marina (July 17th) folk celebrations (panigiri) there. Also, there used to be a long beach stretching from the marvelous Ambelaki coast (east) to the Valahariza shore (west). Nowadays, as a result of the road construction, we find several distinct beaches, of which the most popular are Ambelaki, Platania, Potami, Molos and Valahariza.

== See also ==
- List of settlements in Phocis
