= Stylia =

Stylia or Stilia may refer to several villages in Greece:

- Stylia, Aetolia-Acarnania, a village in the municipal unit Pyllini, Aetolia-Acarnania
- Stilia, Phocis, a village in Phocis
- Stylia, Corinthia, a village in the municipal unit Xylokastro, Corinthia
