= Eptalofos, Phocis =

Eptalofos Επτάλοφος
- Community
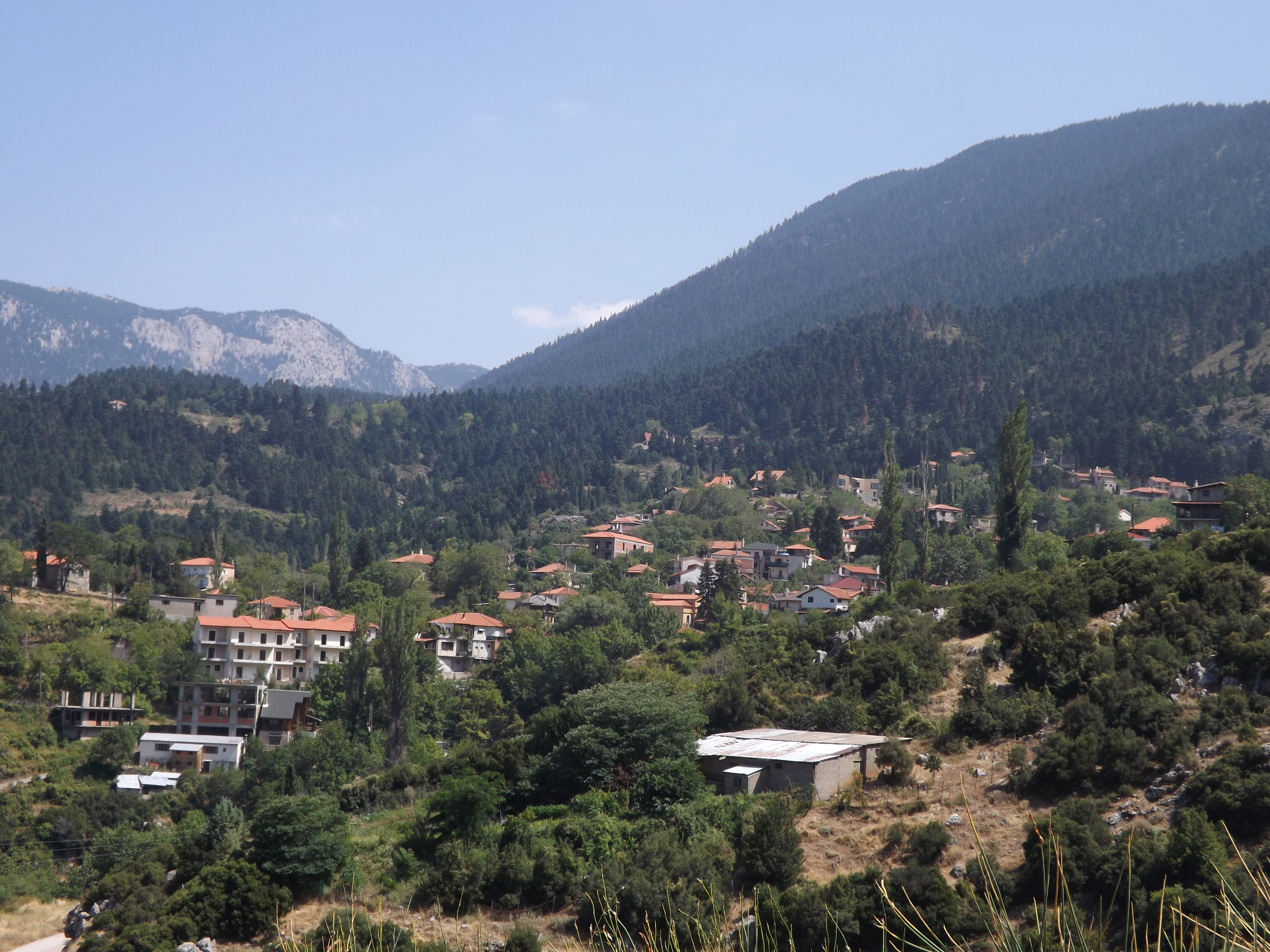
- A view of Eptalofos

- Location within Greece
- Coordinates: 38°35.62632′N 22°29.68878′E
- Country: Greece
- Administrative region: Central Greece
- Regional unit: Phocis
- Municipality: Delphi
- Municipal unit: Parnassos

Area
  - Community: 32.796 km^{2} (12.663 sq mi)
- Elevation: 832 m (2,730 ft)

Population (2021)
  - Community: 388
  - Density: 11.8/km^{2} (30.6/sq mi)
- Time zone: UTC+2 (EET)
  - Summer (DST): UTC+3 (EEST)
- Postal code: 330 57
- Area code: +30-2234
- Vehicle registration: ΑΜ

Eptalofos (Greek: Επτάλοφος) is a village and a community of the Delphi municipality. Before the 2011 local government reform it was a part of the municipality of Parnassos, of which it was a municipal district. The community of Eptalofos covers an area of 32.796 km^{2}.

== Administrative division ==
The community of Eptalofos consists of five separate settlements:

- Eptalofos (population 380 as of 2021)
- Alataries (uninhabited)
- Dokano (pop. 1)
- Itamos (pop. 6)
- Zampeios (pop. 1)

== Population ==
Historical population
Year	Pop.	±%
2001	407	—
2011	470	+15.5%
2021	388	−17.4%

== See also ==
- List of settlements in Phocis
