= Milea, Phocis =

Milea Μηλέα
- Community
- Location within Greece
- Coordinates: 38°27′N 22°09′E
- Country: Greece
- Administrative region: Central Greece
- Regional unit: Phocis
- Municipality: Dorida
- Municipal unit: Tolofon

Population (2021)
  - Community: 54
- Time zone: UTC+2 (EET)
  - Summer (DST): UTC+3 (EEST)

Milea (Greek: Μηλέα; also Milia, meaning "appletree") is a village in the municipal unit of Tolofon, Phocis, Greece. The population is 54 (2021).
