= Pentagioi =

Pentagioi Πενταγιοί
- Community
- Location within Greece
- Coordinates: 38°35′N 22°03′E
- Country: Greece
- Administrative region: Central Greece
- Regional unit: Phocis
- Municipality: Dorida
- Municipal unit: Vardousia

Population (2021)
  - Community: 93
- Time zone: UTC+2 (EET)
  - Summer (DST): UTC+3 (EEST)
- Vehicle registration: ΑΜ

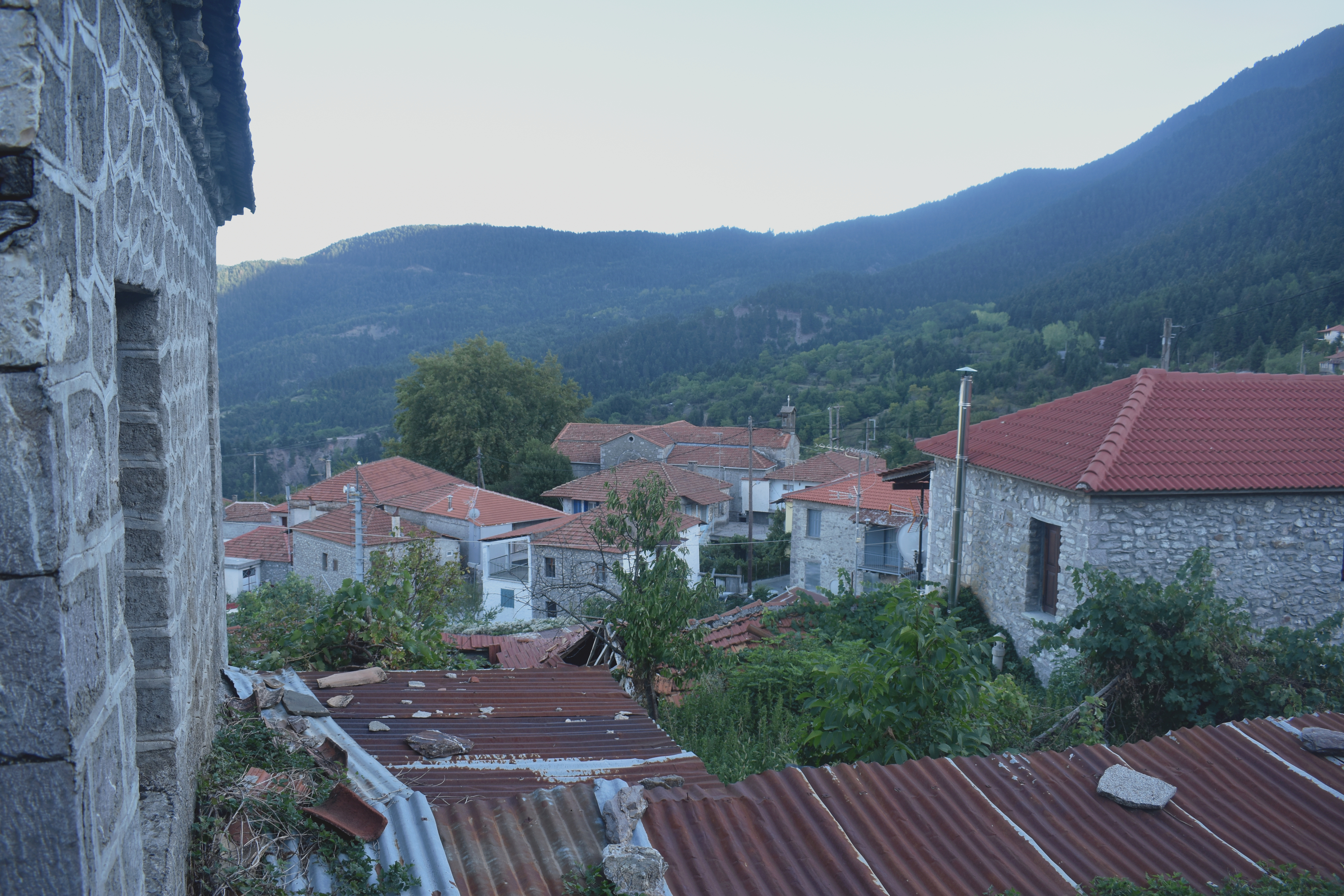
A view of the mountain village of Pentagioi in Phocis, Greece

Pentagioi (Greek: Πενταγιοί) is a mountain village in the municipal unit of Vardousia, northwestern Phocis, Greece. It is famous as the home town of Greek folk heroine Maria "Pentagiotissa".

== Population ==
Year	Population
1981	182
1991	134
2001	267
2011	246
2021	93

== See also ==
- List of settlements in Phocis
