= Trizonia island =

Island off Dorida, Greece

Trizonia
Native name: Τριζόνια
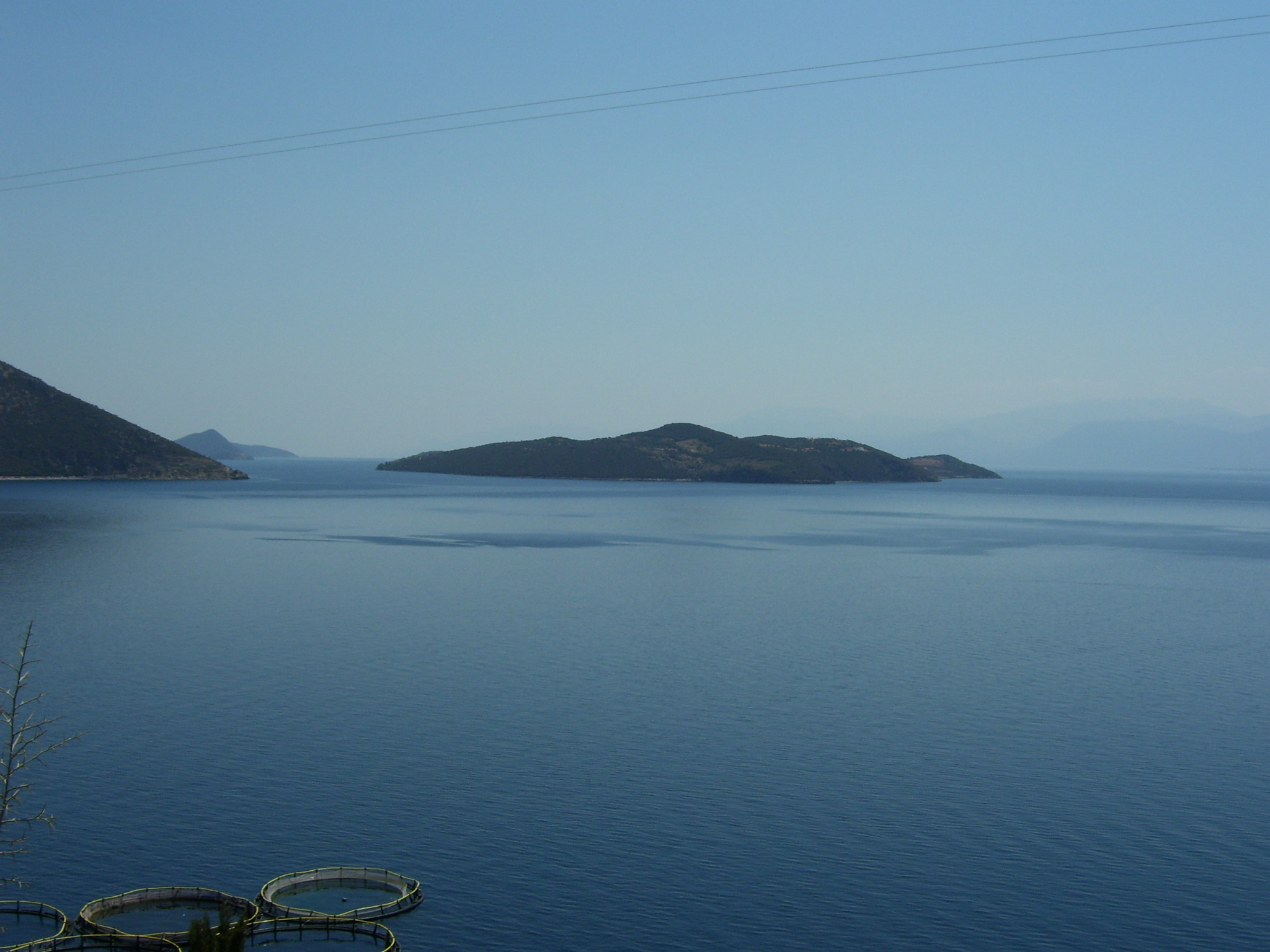
- Trizonia Island

- Location within Greece

Geography
- Coordinates: 38.367°N 22.073°E

Administration
- Greece
- Region: Central Greece
- Regional unit: Phocis

Demographics
- Population: 55 (2021)

Trizonia (Greek: Τριζόνια) is a small island in Corinthian Gulf and the only inhabited island among the islands of the Corinthian gulf. Along with the nearby islets Prasoudi, Planemi and Agios Ioannis comprise a small group of islands. It is located off the north coast of the Corinthian gulf, opposite the villages Glyfada and Chania of Phocis prefecture. Its area is 2.5 square kilometers and its population is 55 inhabitants according to 2021 census. The island belongs to Dorida municipality in Phocis regional unit.

== Description ==
The origin of the name of the island is unknown. According to a view, the name derives from the small insect cricket (in Greek trizoni). In accordance with another view the name derives from corruption of name trionisia that means three islands (because the small group of islands comprises three islands). On the island there is a small settlement, built in the north part. The nearly circular bay in front of the settlement is used as small port for yachts. The island is visited by boat from the opposite village of Glyfada, at the coast of Chania, Phocis. On the island there aren't motor vehicles. Trizonia has three beaches. The biggest of them is named Pounta (also known as the red beach) and is located in the south of the island, with a view of the Peloponnesian coast, Aigio and the Rio–Antirrio Bridge.

== History ==
Edward Blaquiere, a former lieutenant in the Royal Navy and a well known philhellene of his time, visited Trizonia in 1825 and he mentions a ruined village. He also mentions the excellent harbour of the island which is sheltered from all winds. The Greek military leader and politician Andreas Londos came to Trizonia in 1827 with 500 soldiers. In the ensuing battle with the 2000 Ottomans who were there at that time, the Greeks under the guidance of Londos won, causing great damage to the Ottoman army.

== Historical population ==
Census	Population
1991	137
2001	156
2011	64
2021	169

== Gallery ==
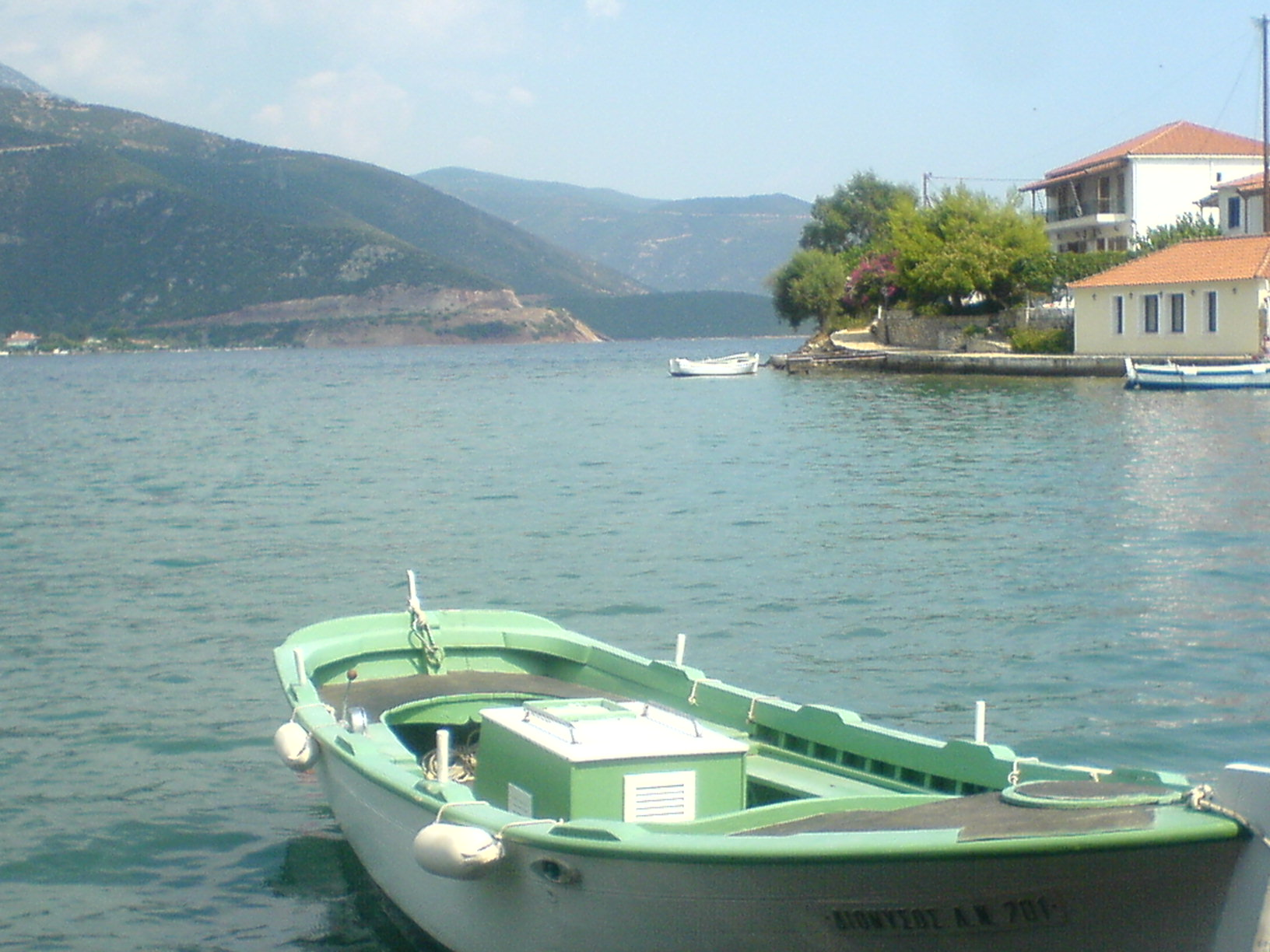
Trizonia

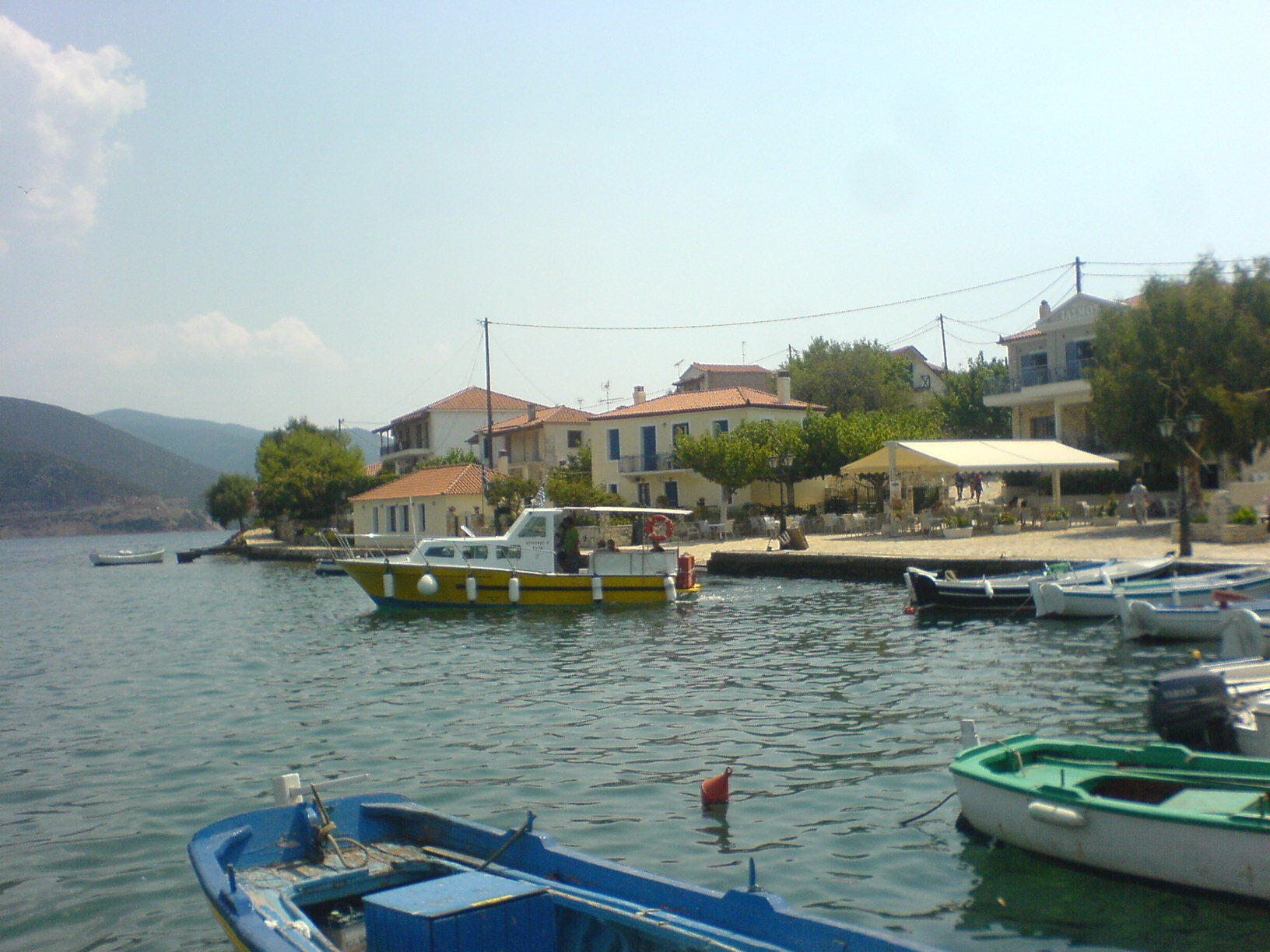
Trizonia village

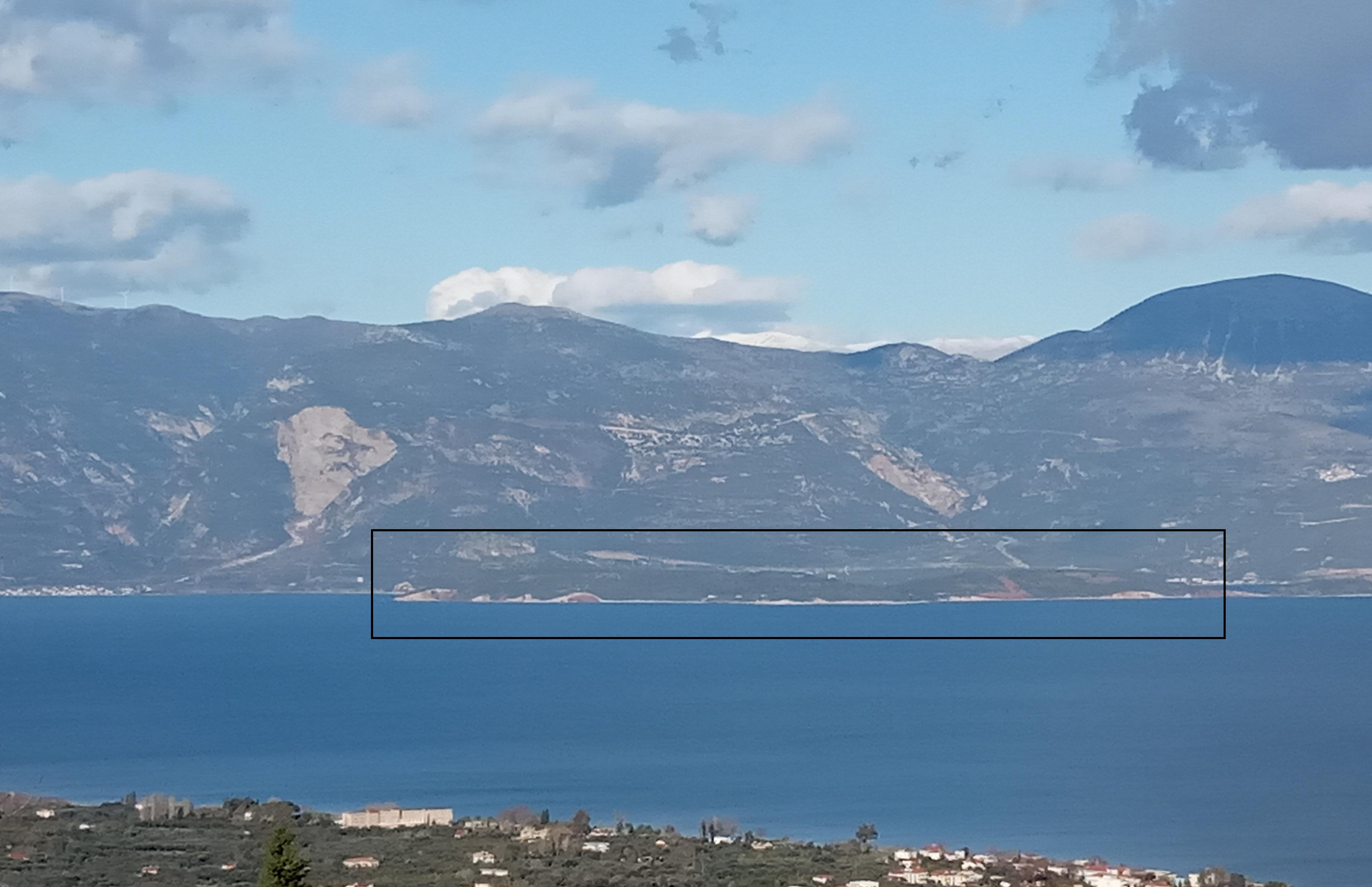
View of Trizonia island as seen from Peloponnese. (outlined with a black line)

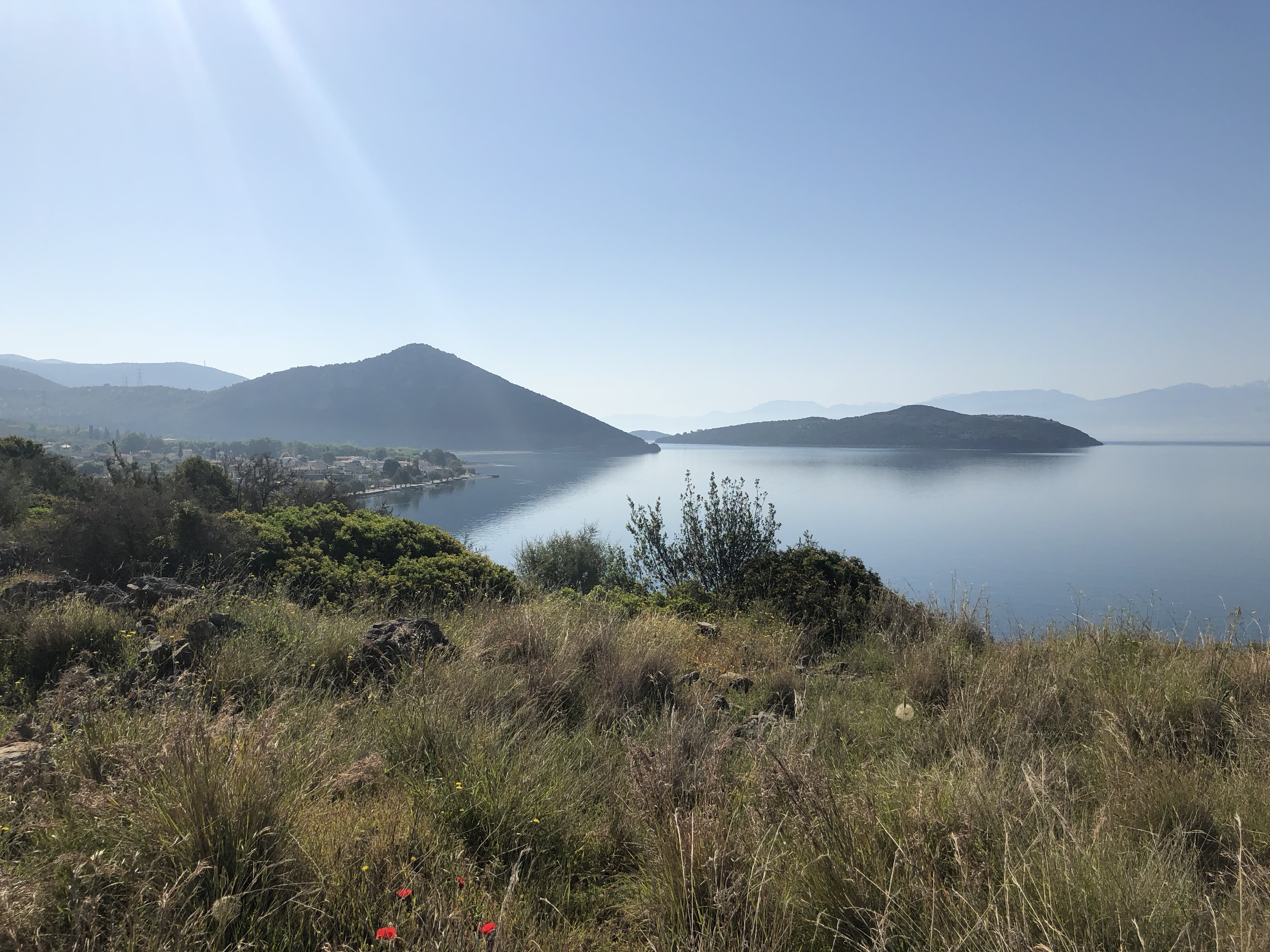
Trizonia island and Sergoula (as seen from the national road)

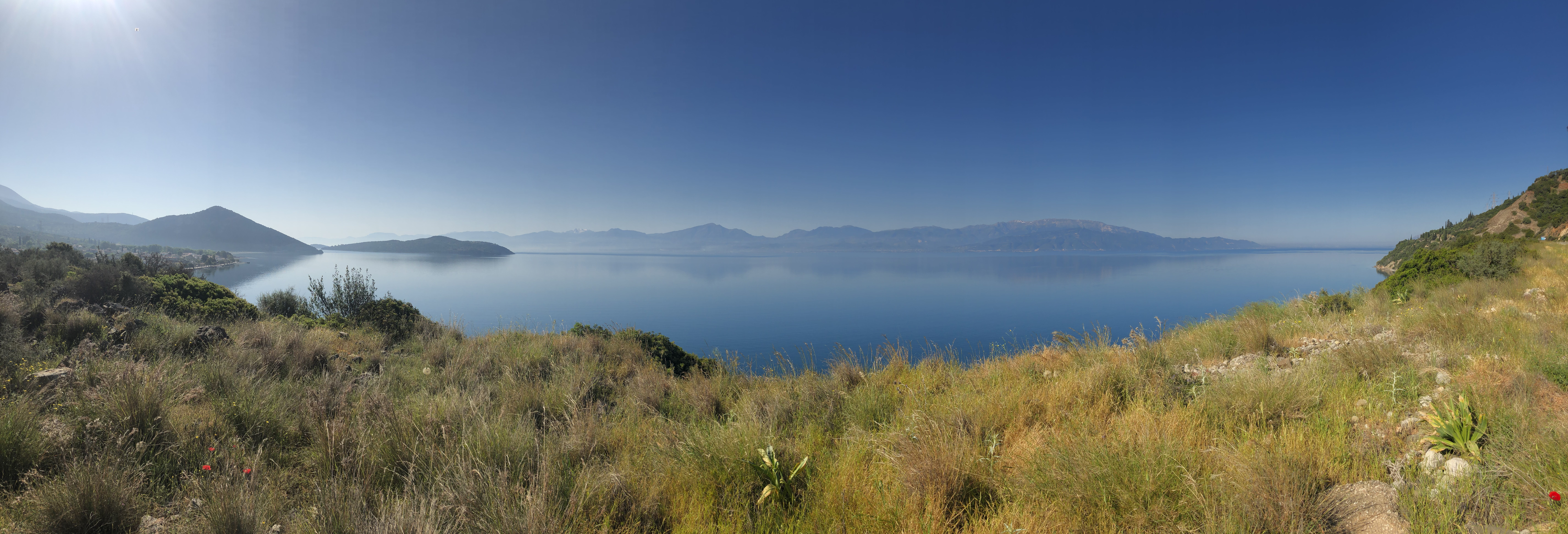
Trizonia island, Gulf of Corinth and the coast of Peloponnese on the south

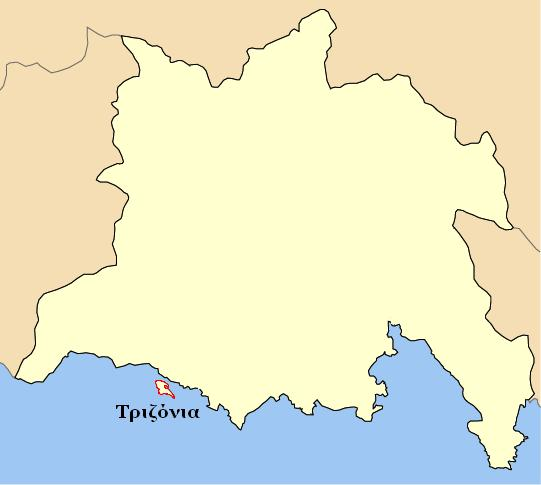
Map of Trizonia island in Greece (Regional unit of Phocis)
