= Central Greece (geographic region) =

Central part of Greece

Central Greece Στερεά Ελλάδα Roumeli Ρούμελη
- Geographic region
- Roumeli (blue) within Greece
- Country: Greece
- Regions (since 1987): Attica, Aetolia-Acarnania, Central Greece
- Regional units: Aetolia-Acarnania, Attica, Boeotia, Euboea, Evrytania, Phocis, Phthiotis
- Capital: Athens (until 1987, then abolished)

Area
  - Total: 24,818.3 km^{2} (9,582.4 sq mi)

Population
  - Total: 4,591,568 (2001 census)
  - Density: 185/km^{2} (480/sq mi)
- Demonym(s): Roumeliotes, Stereoelladites

Roumeli (Greek: Ρούμελη, romanized: Roúmeli) or Central Greece (Greek: Στερεά Ελλάδα, romanized: Stereá Elláda) is the most populous traditional geographic region of Greece. Since 1987, its territory has been divided among Attica, Aetolia-Acarnania as part of Western Greece, and the homonymous administrative region of Central Greece, which includes Phthiotis, Boeotia, Phocis, Evrytania and the island of Euboea. Roumeli forms the southern part of the Greek mainland together with the Peloponnese. The largest city of the region is Athens, which is also the capital of Greece.

== Etymology ==
The region has traditionally been known as Roúmeli (Ρούμελη), a name deriving from the Turkish word Rūm-eli, meaning "the land of the Rūm [the Romans, i.e. the Byzantine Greeks]" and originally encompassing all of the Ottoman Empire's European possessions. The official Greek name Stereá Elláda ("Continental" or "Mainland" Greece) derives from the juxtaposition with the Peloponnese peninsula across the Corinthian Gulf, and the fact that these two territories formed the independent First Hellenic Republic during the Greek War of Independence (1821–1829).

Formerly Roumeli was also called Χέρσος Ἑλλάς, Chérsos Ellás in Greek. The equivalent terms Κεντρική Ελλάδα, Kentrikí Elláda in Greek, and Continental Greece in English are rarely used.

== Geography ==
Central Greece is the most populous geographical region of Greece, with a population of 4,591,568 people, and covers an area of 24,818.3 km^{2} (9,582.4 sq mi), making it the second-largest of the country, after Greek Macedonia. It is located to the north of the Peloponnese and to the south of Thessaly and Epirus, bordering the Aegean Sea to the east, the Ionian Sea to the west and the Corinthian Gulf to the south. Its climate is temperate along its coastlines, and dry in the interior.

=== Mountains ===
The region is one of the most mountainous in Greece, having some of the highest elevations in the country.

Number	Mountain	Height (m)	Ranking in Greece	Regional unit
1	Giona	2,510	5th	Phocis
2	Vardousia	2,495	7th	Phocis
3	Parnassus	2,457	9th	Phocis, Boeotia
4	Tymfristos	2,315	16th	Evrytania, Phthiotis
5	Oeta	2,152	22nd	Phthiotis

=== Lakes ===
Central Greece also has some of the largest lakes in Greece; among the most important is Mornos lake in Phocis, which supplies water to Phocis, parts of Phthiotis, Boeotia, and Athens as well.

Number	Lake	Area (km^{2})	Ranking in Greece	Regional unit
1	Trichonida	96.513	1st	Aetolia-Acarnania
2	Yliki	22.731	9th	Boeotia
3	Amvrakia	13.619	13th	Aetolia-Acarnania
4	Lysimachia	13.200	14th	Aetolia-Acarnania
5	Ozeros	10.013	16th	Aetolia-Acarnania

=== Rivers ===
Some important and well-known rivers of Central Greece are the Acheloos in Aetolia-Acarnania, which is the second longest of the country, the Spercheios in Phthiotis, the Evenus in Aetolia-Acarnania, and the Mornos in Phocis.

== History ==
=== Mythology and early history ===
Homer refers to Hellenes as an originally relatively small tribe settled in Thessalic Phthia. During the era of the Trojan War they were centered along the settlements of Alos, Alope, Trachis, and the Pelasgian Argos. This Homeric Hellas is described as "καλλιγύναικος", kalligýnaikos 'of beautiful women', and its warriors, the Hellenes, along with the feared Myrmidons, were under the command of Achilles. The Parian Chronicle mentions that Phthia was the homeland of the Hellenes and that this name was given to those previously called Greeks (Γραικοί). Alcman (7th century BC) also refers that the mothers of Hellenes were Graikoi. In Greek mythology, Hellen, the patriarch of Hellenes, was son of Deucalion, who ruled around Phthia with Pyrrha, the only survivors after the great deluge. It seems that the myth was invented when the Greek tribes started to separate from each other in certain areas of Greece and it indicates their common origin.

=== Archaic, Classical, and Hellenistic periods ===
The name Hellenes was probably used by the Greeks with the establishment of the Great Amphictyonic League. This was an ancient association of Greek tribes with twelve founders which was organized to protect the great temples of Apollo in Delphi (Phocis) and of Demeter near Thermopylae (Locris). According to legend it was founded after the Trojan War, by the eponymous Amphictyon, brother of Hellen. Athens, Thebes and Delphi were the most prominent poleis of the region.

During the first and second Persian invasion of Greece, the battles between the Hellenic alliance led by Sparta and Athens, and the Achaemenid empire, at Marathon, Thermopylae, Artemisium, Salamis, and Plataea took place in Central Greece. The Athenian, Spartan, Theban and Macedonian hegemonies followed successively during the 5th and 4th century BC.

After the successful defence against the Gallic invasion of Greece in 279 BC, the Aetolian League controlled much of Central Greece.

=== Roman and Byzantine periods ===
In the 2nd century BC, most of Central Greece came under the control of Rome after the Aetolian and Macedonian Wars.

== Cities ==
The principal cities of the region of Central Greece according to the census of 2001 are:

- Athens, capital of Greece
  3,130,841 (Athens urban area)
  3,761,810 (Athens metropolitan area)
- Chalkida

53,584

- Lamia, capital of Central Greece (administrative region)

58,601

- Agrinio

57,147

- Missolonghi

32,048

- Thebes

21,211

- Livadeia

20,061

- Karpenisi

11,445

- Amfissa

7,761

== Archaeological sites ==
- Acropolis of Athens
- Cadmea
- Delphi
- Thermopylae
- Thermon
- Hosios Loukas

== Gallery ==
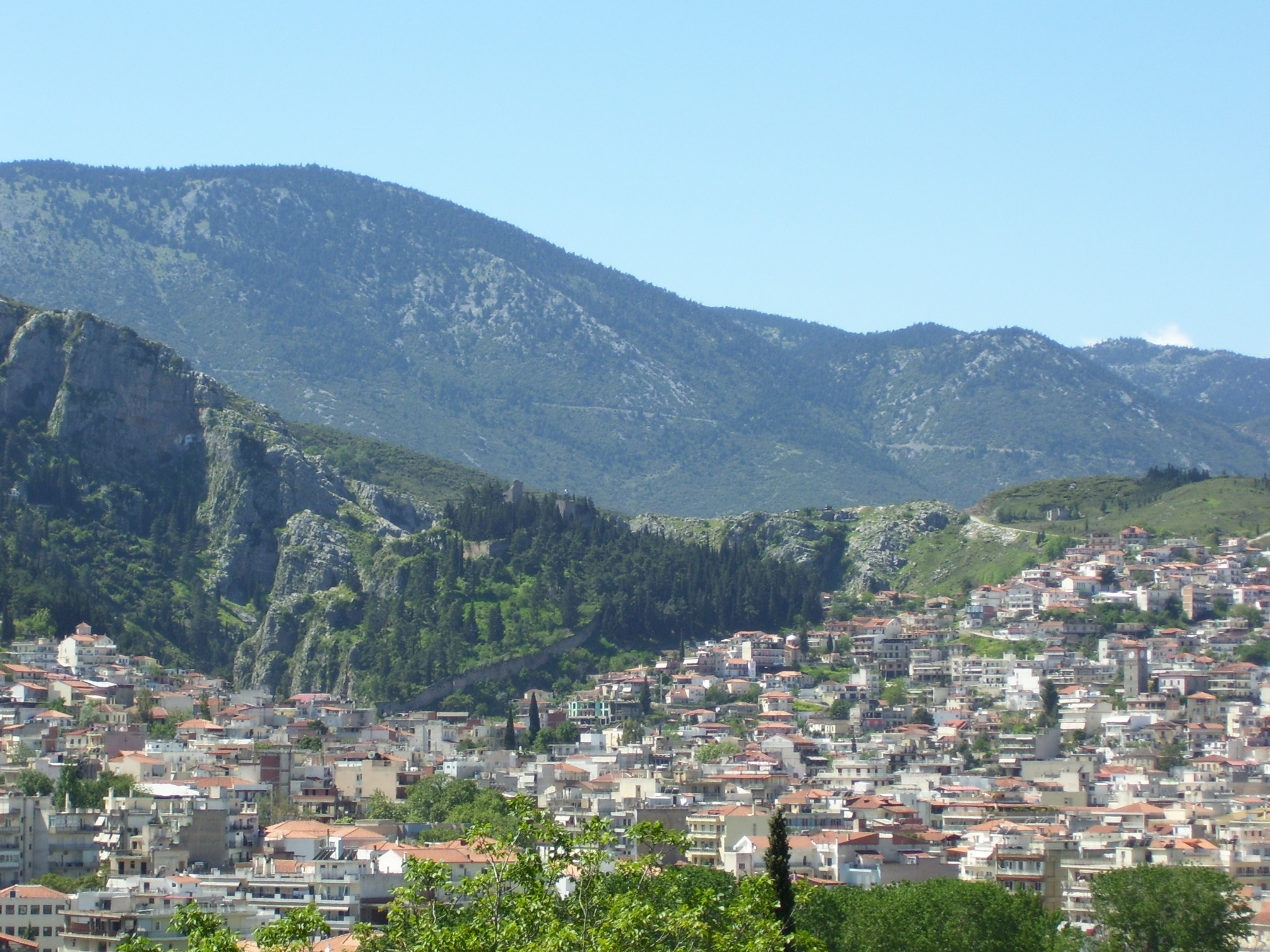
Livadeia

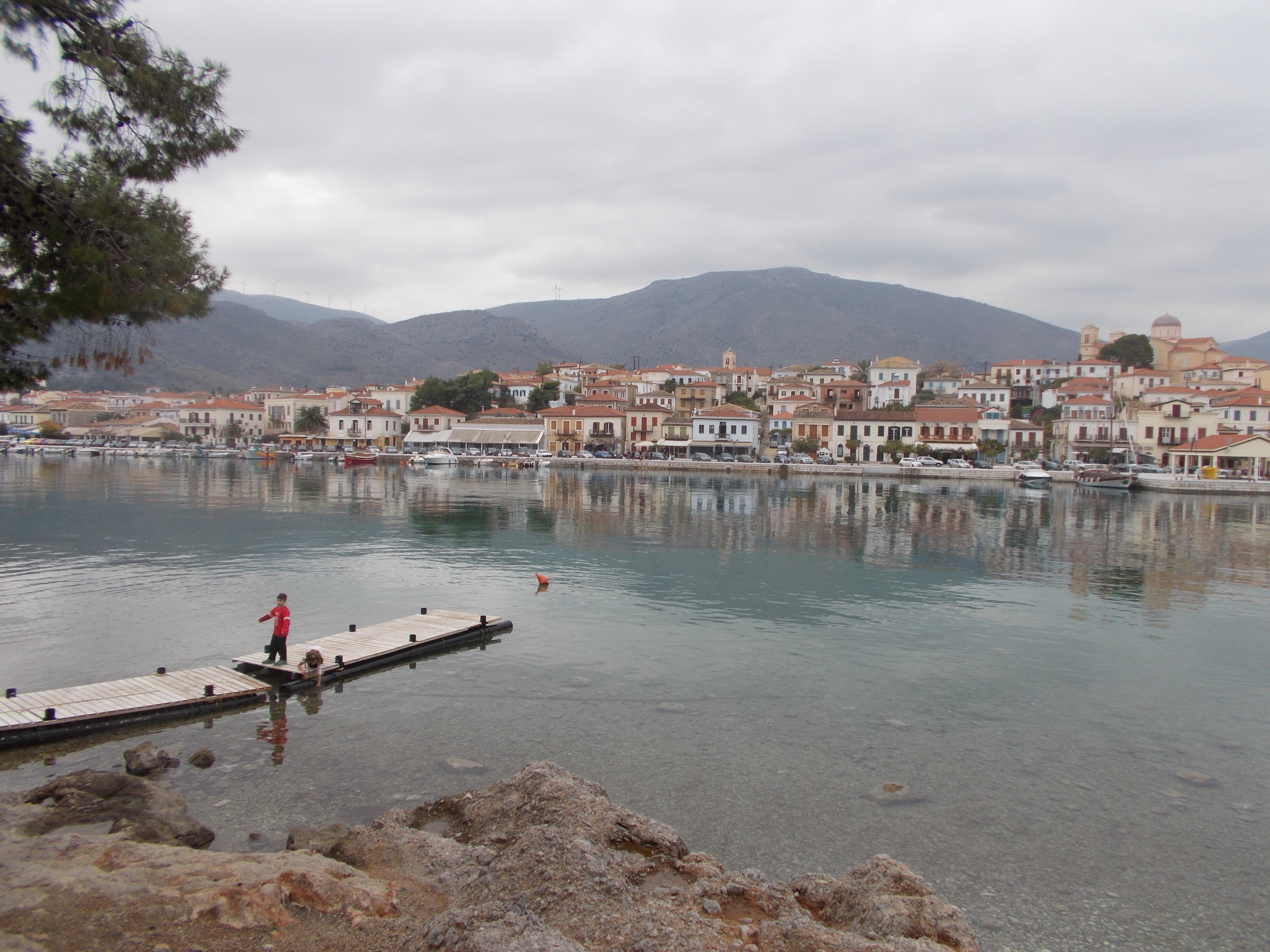
Galaxidi

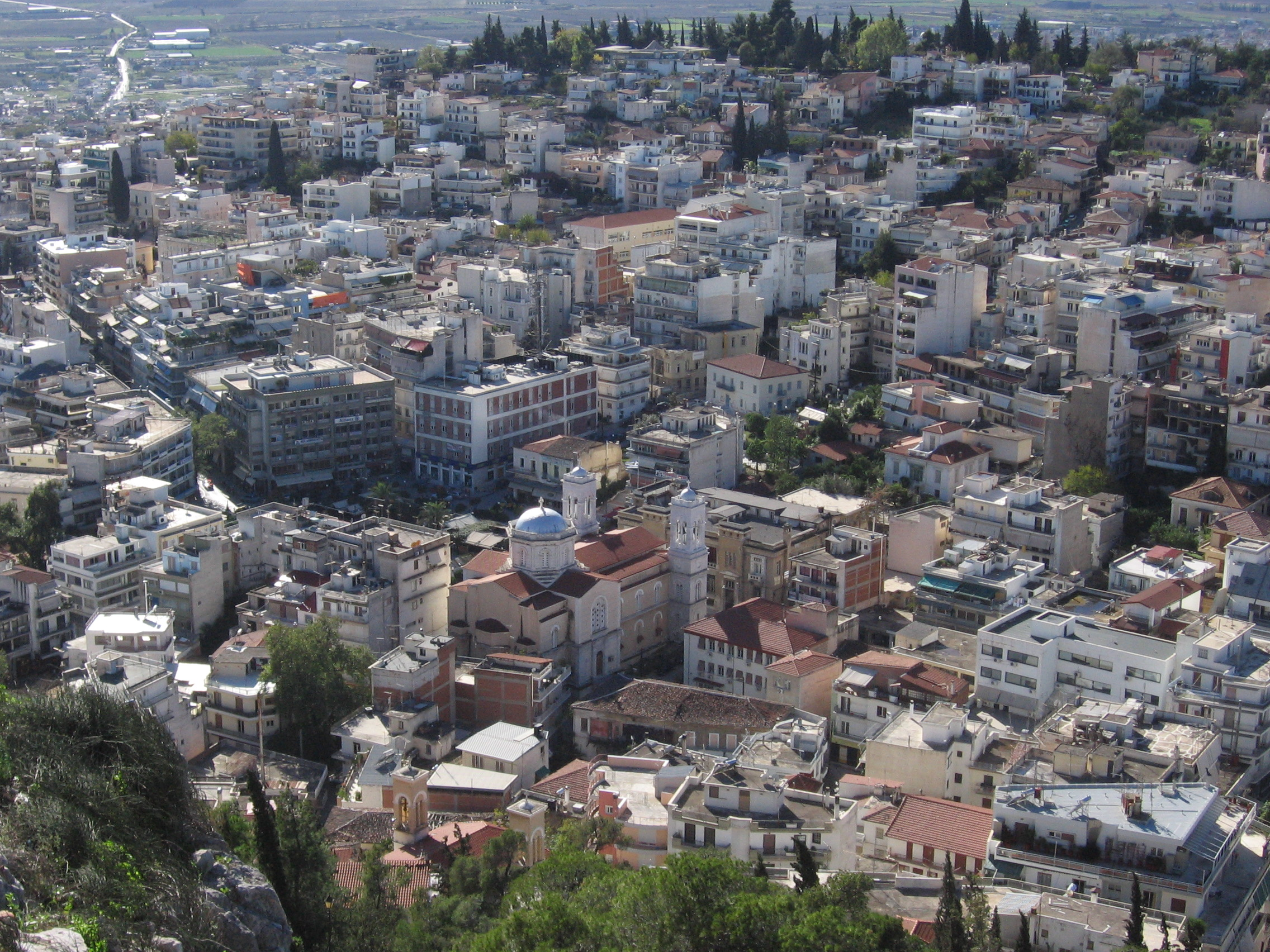
Lamia

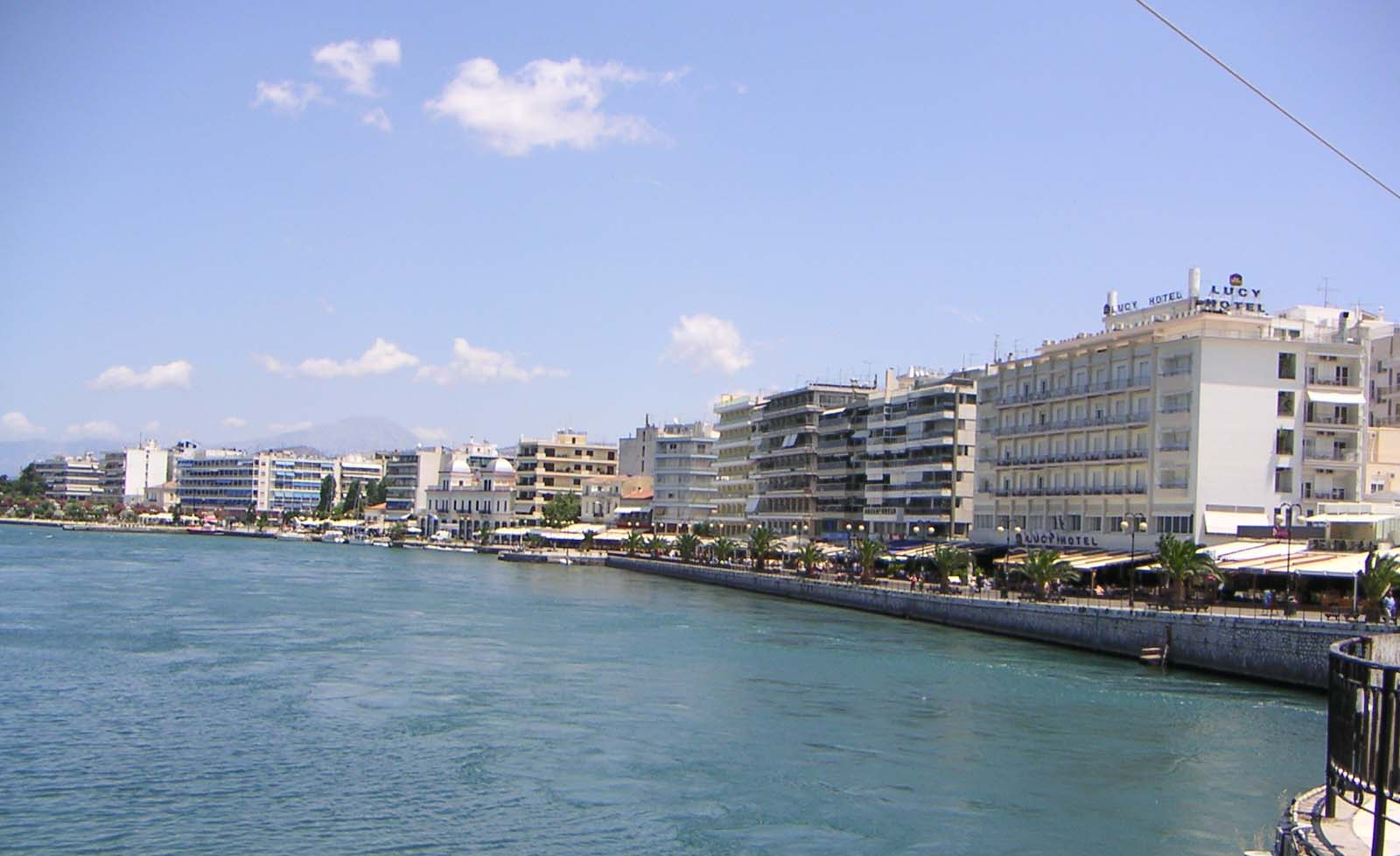
Chalkis

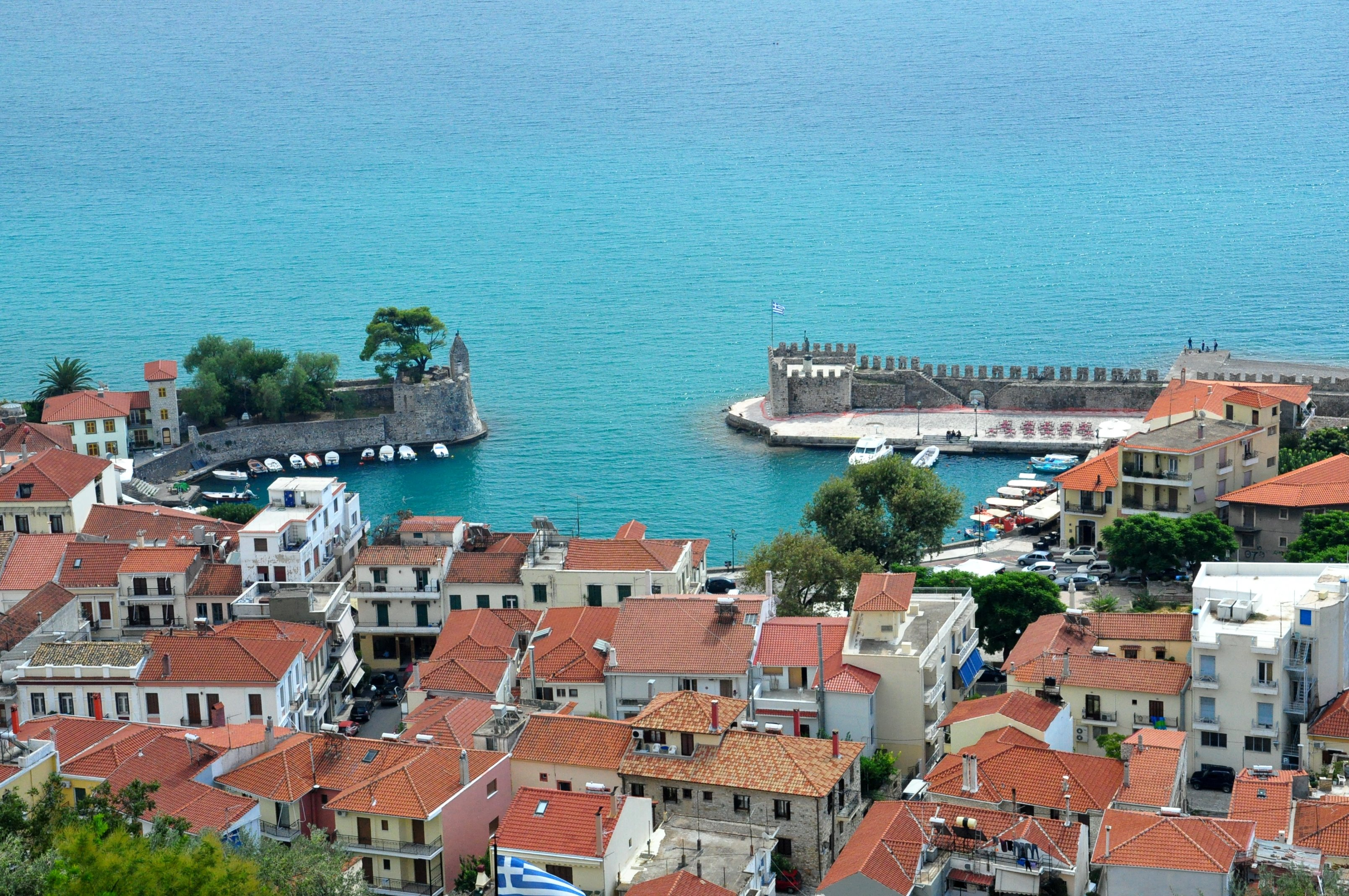
Nafpaktos

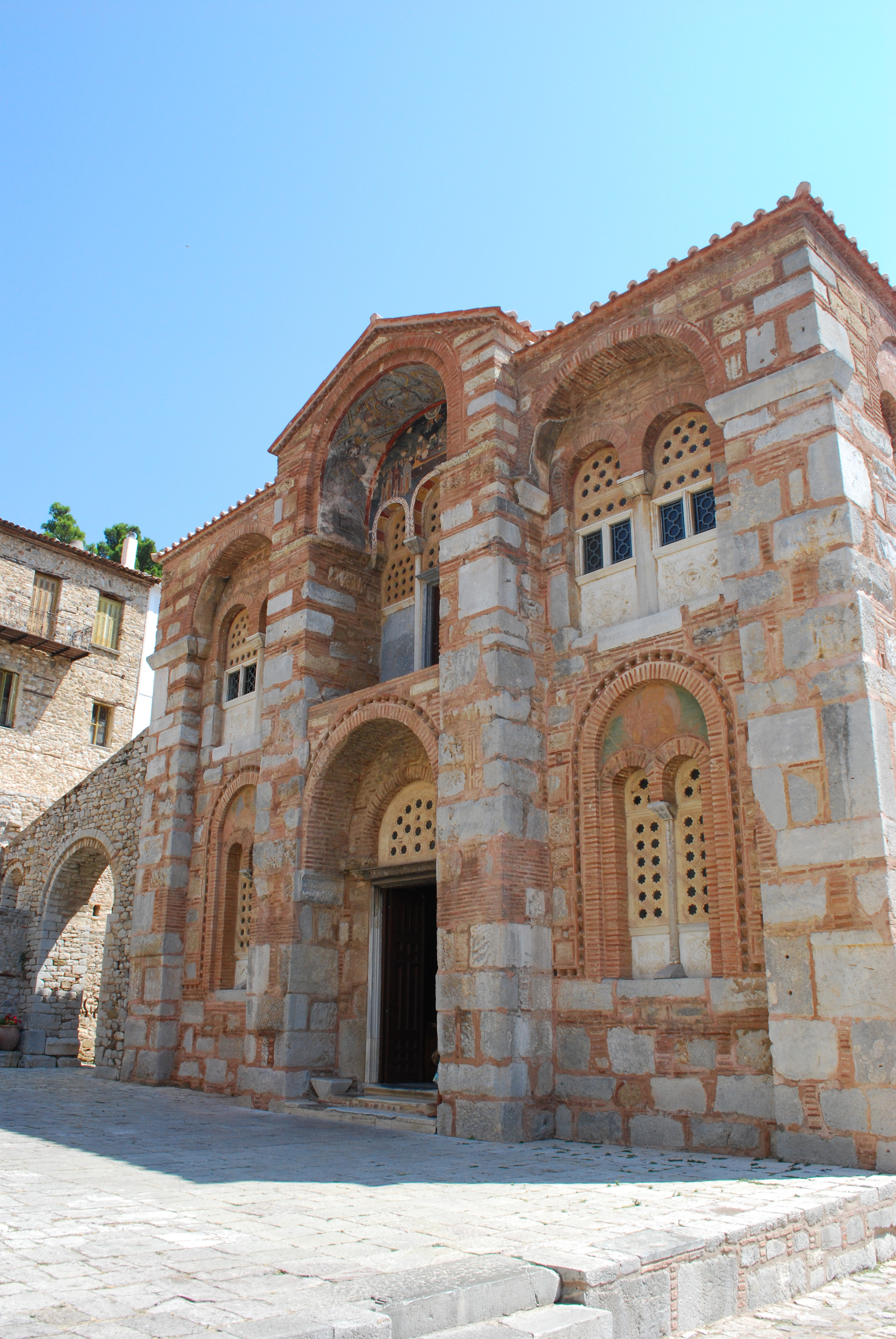
Hosios Loukas

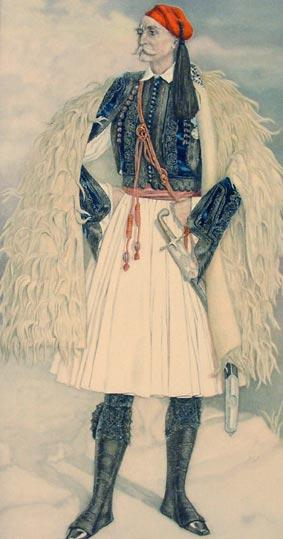
Fustanella from central Greece

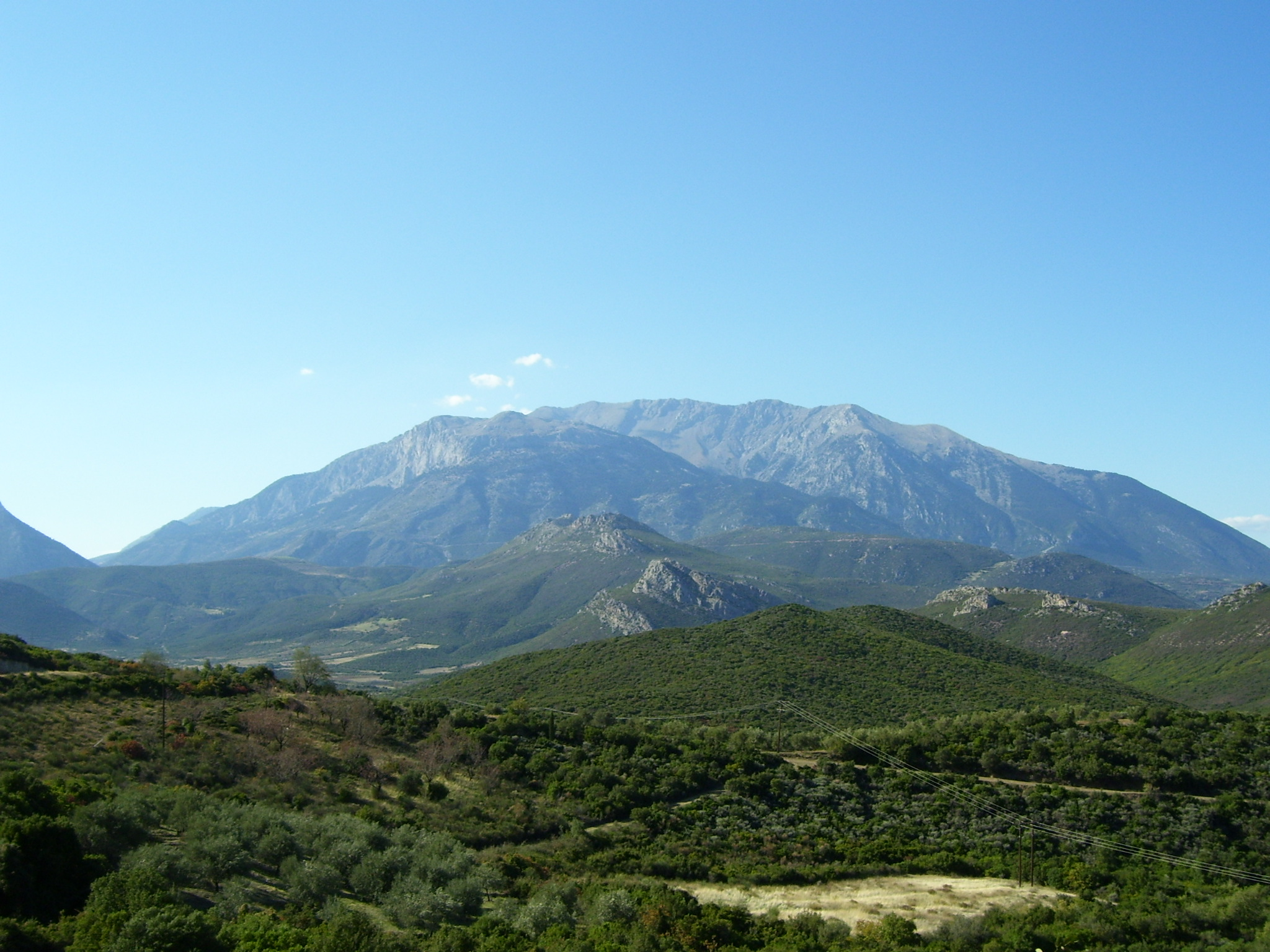
Mount Parnassus

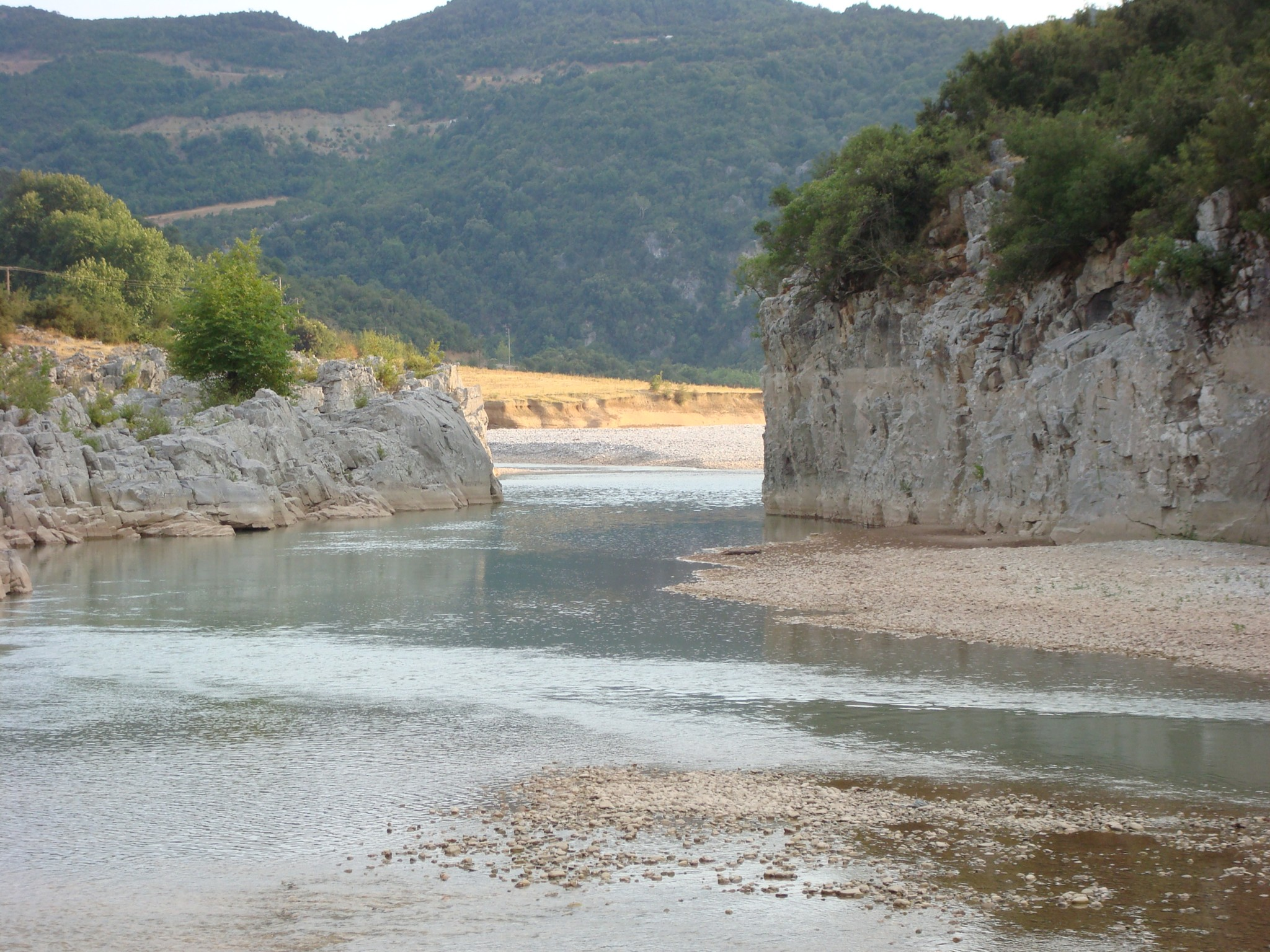
Achelous river

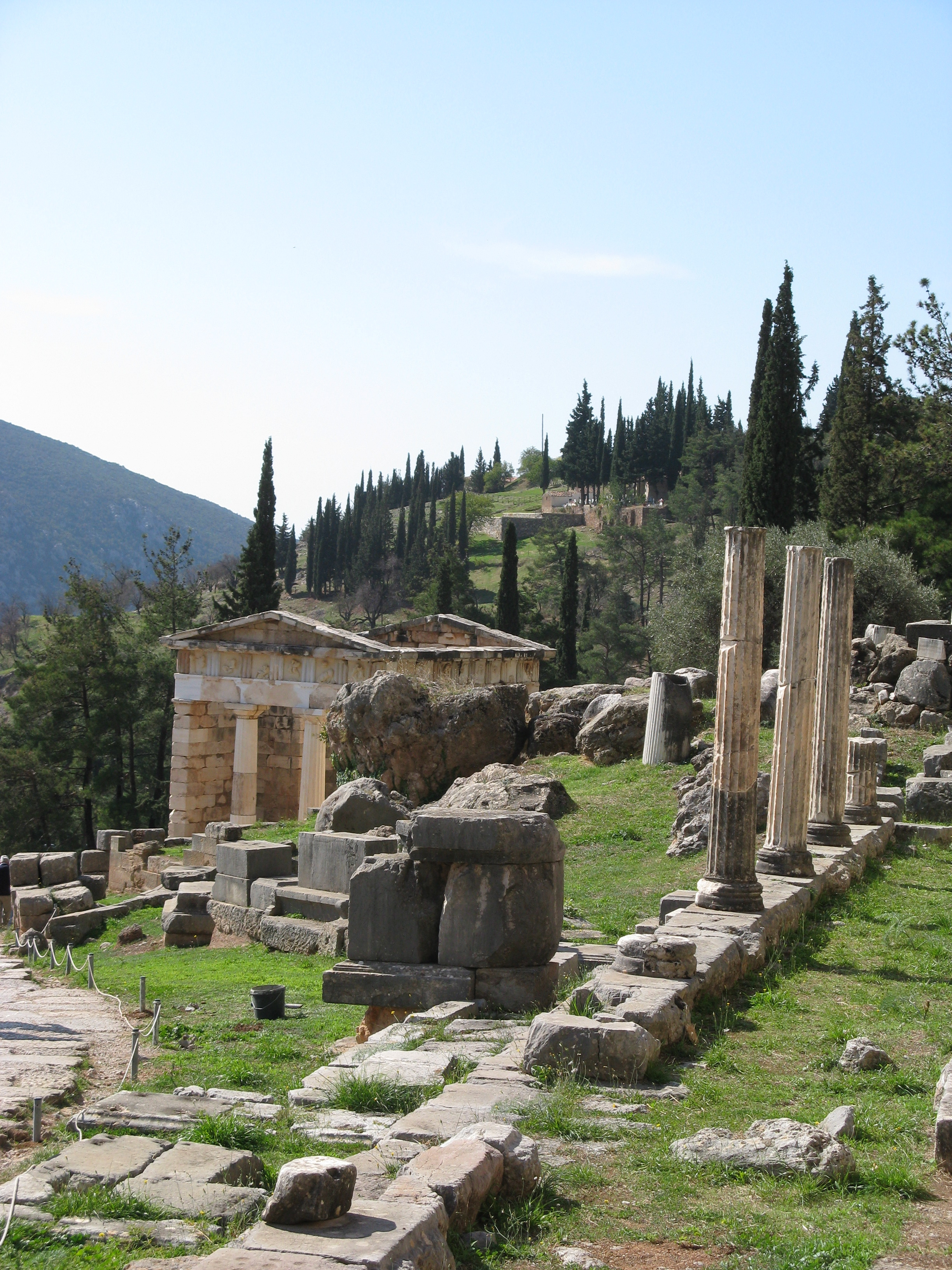
The Athenian Treasury in Delphi

== See also ==
- Greek Thrace
- Crete
- Southern Aegean
- Northern Aegean
