= Dafnochori =

Dafnochori may refer to:

- Glyfada, Central Greece, a.k.a. Dafnochori, a community in the Tolofon municipal unit of Dorida, Phocis, Central Greece
- Mesiano, a.k.a. Dafnochori, a community in the Kilkis municipal unit of Central Macedonia, in the Balkans
