= Stilia, Phocis =

Phocis village

Stilia Στίλια
- Community
- Location within Greece
- Coordinates: 38°28′05″N 22°06′14″E
- Country: Greece
- Administrative region: Central Greece
- Regional unit: Phocis
- Municipality: Dorida
- Municipal unit: Lidoriki

Population (2021)
  - Community: 133
- Time zone: UTC+2 (EET)
  - Summer (DST): UTC+3 (EEST)

Stilia (Greek: Στίλια) is a village of Phocis, Greece. The village is part of the municipal unit of Lidoriki. The mean altitude of the village is 870m above sea level. The village is surrounded by a pristine oak forest. Two small ravines delimit the boundaries of the village to the north, east and west sides while the 1570m high Trikorfo mountain rises towards the south. The abovementioned geography makes the northerly facing village's climate harsh during the winter months. Snow and below freezing temperatures occur often and the high rising mountain limits the hours of sunshine per day during the winter to 4-5 hours maximum. Cattle raising is the main economic activity of the few remaining families.
