= Alexander of Phocis =

3rd-century BC Greek governor

- Ἀλέξανδρος
- Occupation: Governor of Phocis
- Years active: c. 210s BC

Alexander (Gr. Ἀλέξανδρος) was appointed governor of Phocis by Philip V of Macedon. The Phocian town of Panopeus was commanded by Jason, to whom he had entrusted this post. In concert with him he invited the Aetolians to come and take possession of the town, promising that it should be opened and surrendered to them. The Aetolians, under the command of Aegetas, accordingly entered the town at night; and when their best men were within the walls, they were made prisoners by Alexander and his associate. This happened in 217 BC.
