= Vardousia (municipality) =

Vardousia Βαρδούσια
- Municipal unit
- Location within the regional unit

- Location within Greece
- Coordinates: 38°37′N 22°02′E
- Country: Greece
- Administrative region: Central Greece
- Regional unit: Phocis
- Municipality: Dorida

Area
  - Municipal unit: 253.7 km^{2} (98.0 sq mi)

Population (2021)
  - Municipal unit: 970
  - Municipal unit density: 3.8/km^{2} (9.9/sq mi)
- Time zone: UTC+2 (EET)
  - Summer (DST): UTC+3 (EEST)
- Vehicle registration: ΑΜ

Vardousia (Greek: Βαρδούσια) is a former municipality in Phocis, Greece. Since the 2011 local government reform, it is a municipal unit of the municipality Dorida. The municipal unit has an area of 253.725 km^{2}. Population 970 (2021). The seat of the municipality was in Krokyleio. It was named after the mountain Vardousia, which is located in the municipal unit.

== Subdivisions ==
The municipal unit Lidoriki is subdivided into the following communities:

- Alpochori
- Artotina
- Dichori
- Kerassies
- Kokkino
- Koupaki
- Kriatsi
- Krokyleio
- Pentagioi
- Perivoli
- Tristeno
- Ypsilo Chori
- Zorianos
