= Efpalio =

Efpalio Ευπάλιο
- Municipal unit
- Location within the regional unit

- Location within Greece
- Coordinates: 38°27′N 21°59′E
- Country: Greece
- Administrative region: Central Greece
- Regional unit: Phocis
- Municipality: Dorida

Area
  - Municipal unit: 204.2 km^{2} (78.8 sq mi)

Population (2021)
  - Municipal unit: 5,508
  - Municipal unit density: 26.97/km^{2} (69.86/sq mi)
  - Community: 882
- Time zone: UTC+2 (EET)
  - Summer (DST): UTC+3 (EEST)
- Vehicle registration: ΑΜ

Efpalio (Greek: Ευπάλιο) is a village and a former municipality in Phocis, Greece. Since the 2011 local government reform it is part of the municipality Dorida, of which it is a municipal unit. The municipal unit has an area of 204.207 km^{2} (78.845 sq mi). Population 5,508 (2021).

The municipal unit Efpalio consists of sixteen communities: Kastraki, Efpalio, Managouli, Trikorfo, Malamata, Marathias, Monastiraki, Klima, Sergoula, Filothei, Kampos, Potidaneia, Teichio, Drosato, Palaioxari, and Pyrgos.

== Monasteries ==
The area is also known for several important monasteries such as:

- The monastery of Panagia of Varnakova. It is a Byzantine monastery, built in 1077 A.D. by Saint Arsenios. Varnakova was a centre of Orthodoxy and Greek culture, in the years during which the Latins influenced Western Greece and mainly during the Frankish rule when there were plans for converting Greek people into Catholics under the Pope of Rome. During the war of 1821 it was the center of supply for the freedom fighters of Roumeli. Today the sacred monastery of Panagia of Varnakova, found in the engulf of a great forest is a place of spiritual peace.
- The newly built Monasteries of Trikorfo of St Augustine's and Seraphim of Sarof. It is well known for its 400 bells and 62 church bells, as well as the musical monk group “Paparockades”
- The historic monastery of St John of Thermes at the big springs of the river of Mantilo.
- The old Christian church of Ascension of the Savior in New Koukoura.
- The beautiful St John's monastery of Efpalio made with Byzantine technique, and unique art. It is built on the fringe of Efpalio "Platanitsa" area. It is a place of refreshment and religious celebrations.

== Other points of interest ==
- the popular Art Museum of Efpalio
- the Mornos river dam and the man made lake it has created
- Kefalogiefyro, an excellent and unique bridge in the region, perfectly constructed and well preserved over the narrow pass of Mornopotamos.
