= Tolofon =

Tolofon Τολοφών
- Municipal unit
- Location within the regional unit

- Location within Greece
- Coordinates: 38°22′N 22°12′E
- Country: Greece
- Administrative region: Central Greece
- Regional unit: Phocis
- Municipality: Dorida

Area
  - Municipal unit: 131.38 km^{2} (50.73 sq mi)

Population (2021)
  - Municipal unit: 2,484
  - Municipal unit density: 18.91/km^{2} (48.97/sq mi)
  - Community: 484
- Time zone: UTC+2 (EET)
  - Summer (DST): UTC+3 (EEST)
- Vehicle registration: ΑΜ
- Website: www.fokida.gr

Tolofon (Greek: Τολοφών, also Τολοφώνας, Tolofonas; before 1927: Βιτρινίτσα, Vitrinitsa) is a village and a former municipality in Phocis, Greece. Since the 2011 local government reform it is part of the municipality Dorida, of which it is a municipal unit. The municipal unit has an area of 131.384 km^{2}. The seat of the municipality was in Erateini. The ancient site of Tolophon is located in the northeastern part of the municipal unit. It is situated on the mountainous north coast of the Gulf of Corinth.

== History and archaeology ==
The region of Tolofon along with the valley of Erateini were relatively densely populated in the prehistoric and early historic periods according to archaeological finds. Architectural remains and burial traces dated to the Middle Helladic period have been excavated on the beach of Tolofon and around the rupestral church of St. Paraskevi. At the site of Mathiou (or Marathiou) there are some visible remains of a Cyclopean fortification, typical of the Mycenaean era, and some fortifications at the sites Bouhouri and Palaiokastro of Vitrinitsa are also extant. A Mycenaean settlement existed on the Pitha hill, known due to Mycenaean pottery and shards being discovered at the site. The same hill was inhabited also in later periods, as attested by the fortifications of the Classical and Hellenistic periods. Scholars identify the site as ancient Oeantheia, one of the main cities of western Locris, but there is no secure testimony to that identification. However, large parts of the building material of the site has been reused, for example at the medieval tower on the foothill of Pitha and at the Church of the Evangelistria (Panagia Polyportou), a Byzantine church of the 10th-11th century A.D. Finally, at Marathias (close to Erateini) a burial within a pithos (large jar) dated to the 7th century B.C. revealed a large number of Corinthian vessels, particularly aryballoi, as well as a scarab made of fayence, now on display at the Archaeological Museum of Amfissa. These finds attest to the commercial relations between the two shores of the Corinthian Gulf.

The modern settlement was established in the Middle Ages as Vitrinitsa (from the Slavic Větrьnica, "windy place") and is first mentioned as one of the places plundered by the Normans in 1147.

Following the Fourth Crusade (1204), it became part of the Frankish Lordship of Salona. A small castle was built on a hill on the western edge of the plain, attested to in literary sources in the 14th century but possibly built earlier. Only its ruined foundations survive today. Under Catalan rule after 1311, it was often given as an independent fief within the County of Salona, under its own castellan. It was captured by the Ottomans in 1394, and then by the Despot of the Morea Theodore I Palaiologos in 1397. The latter ceded it, along with the entire County of Salona, to the Knights Hospitaller in 1403–04. The Ottomans regained the area soon after, but ceded Vitrinitsa to the Republic of Venice. In 1445, the Despot of the Morea Constantine Palaiologos occupied the castle and port. It is possible that the settlement of Katakouzenopolis (Κατακουζηνόπολις), which Cyriacus of Ancona visited in the area in 1448 and which he identified with Oeantheia, is to be identified with Vitrinitsa. The entire area finally came under Ottoman control shortly after.

== Subdivisions ==
The municipal unit Tolofon is subdivided into the following communities (constituent villages in brackets):

- Elaia (Elaia, Agios Ioannis island)
- Erateini
- Glyfada (Glyfada, Dafnochori)
- Kallithea (Kallithea, Agia Eirini, Agios Nikolaos, Agios Nikolaos island, Agios Spyridonas, Klovinos, Prasoudi island, Flampourakia)
- Makrini
- Milea
- Panormos (Panormos, Ormos Lemonias)
- Tolofon (Tolofon, Paralia Tolofonos)
- Trizonia (Trizonia island, Chania, Spilia)

== Population ==
Year	Village population	Community population	Municipal unit population
1981	-	637	-
1991	346	-	2,839
2001	300	619	3,073
2011	293	539	2,762
2021	231	484	2,484

== See also ==
- List of settlements in Phocis

== Bibliography ==
- Pascual, J., 2013, Topography and History of Ancient Epicnemidian Locris, Brill Academic Publishers
