= Lidoriki =

Village in Phocis, Greece

Lidoriki Λιδωρίκι
- Municipal unit
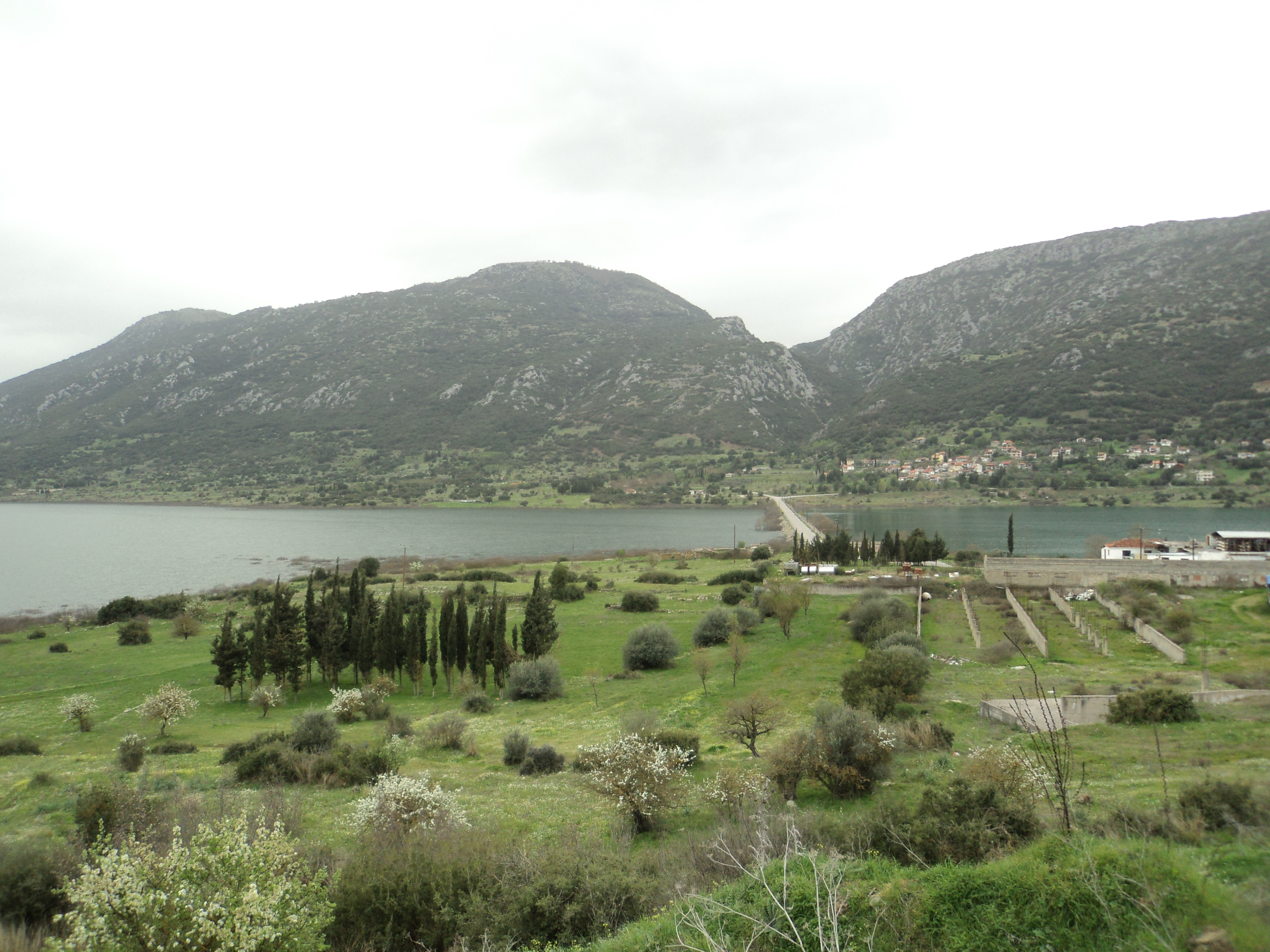

- Location within the regional unit

- Location within Greece
- Coordinates: 38°32′N 22°12′E
- Country: Greece
- Administrative region: Central Greece
- Regional unit: Phocis
- Municipality: Dorida

Area
  - Municipal unit: 409.6 km^{2} (158.1 sq mi)

Population (2021)
  - Municipal unit: 3,072
  - Municipal unit density: 7.500/km^{2} (19.42/sq mi)
  - Community: 531
- Time zone: UTC+2 (EET)
  - Summer (DST): UTC+3 (EEST)
- Vehicle registration: ΑΜ

Lidoriki (Greek: Λιδωρίκι, Katharevousa: Λιδωρίκιον) is a village and a former municipality in Phocis, Greece. Since the 2011 local government reform, it is part of the municipality of Dorida, of which it is the seat and a municipal unit. The area of the municipal unit is 409.577 km², covering nearly one-fifth of Phocis. Lidoriki is built on the western slopes of Mount Giona and over the Mornos river valley. It is the centre of the mountains of Dorida.

== Location ==
Lidoriki is located west of Amfissa, northwest of Itea and east-northeast of Nafpaktos. Lidoriki is located above the Mornos artificial reservoir, formed by the Mornos Dam, completed in 1974. The reservoir supplies most of the drinking water used in Athens. Lidoriki is also connected to Amfissa via the largest tunnel in Greece with 16.5 km length. This is not a street tunnel, but an aquaeduct for the water from the Mornos reservoir.

== History ==
Lidoriki is attested since the late 9th century in the Notitiae Episcopatuum of the Patriarchate of Constantinople as a bishopric, a suffragan of the Metropolis of Larissa. From the Chronicle of Galaxeidi it is known that the area suffered from an outbreak of plague in 1054.

After 1204 it became part of the Despotate of Epirus until 1327, when it was occupied by the Catalans of the Duchy of Athens. Under Catalan rule it belonged to the County of Salona, and was mostly controlled by the Fadrique family. A castle (Lodorich castrum) is attested in the sources in the 14th century, but no trace of it survives. It was captured by the Ottomans under Sultan Bayezid I in January 1394, and then by the Despot of the Morea, Theodore I Palaiologos, in 1397, but it was finally conquered by the Ottomans soon after. In 1448, it was visited by the scholar and traveller Cyriacus of Ancona.

In 1944, the village was bombarded and burned to the ground by the Nazi occupation forces.

== Subdivisions ==
The municipal unit Lidoriki is subdivided into the following communities (constituent villages in brackets):

- Amygdalia
- Avoros
- Dafnos
- Diakopi
- Doriko
- Kallio (Kallio, Klima, Trividi)
- Karoutes
- Koniakos
- Lefkaditi
- Lidoriki
- Malandrino
- Pentapoli (Pentapoli, Aigitio, Lefka, Palaiokastro, Skaloula)
- Perithiotissa
- Stilia
- Sotaina
- Sykia
- Vraila

== Population ==
Year	Village population	Municipality population
1981	790	-
1991	985	4,403
2001	881	4,225
2011	875	3,388
2021	531	3,072
