= Dorida =

Municipality in Phocis, Greece

Dorida Δωρίδα
- Municipality
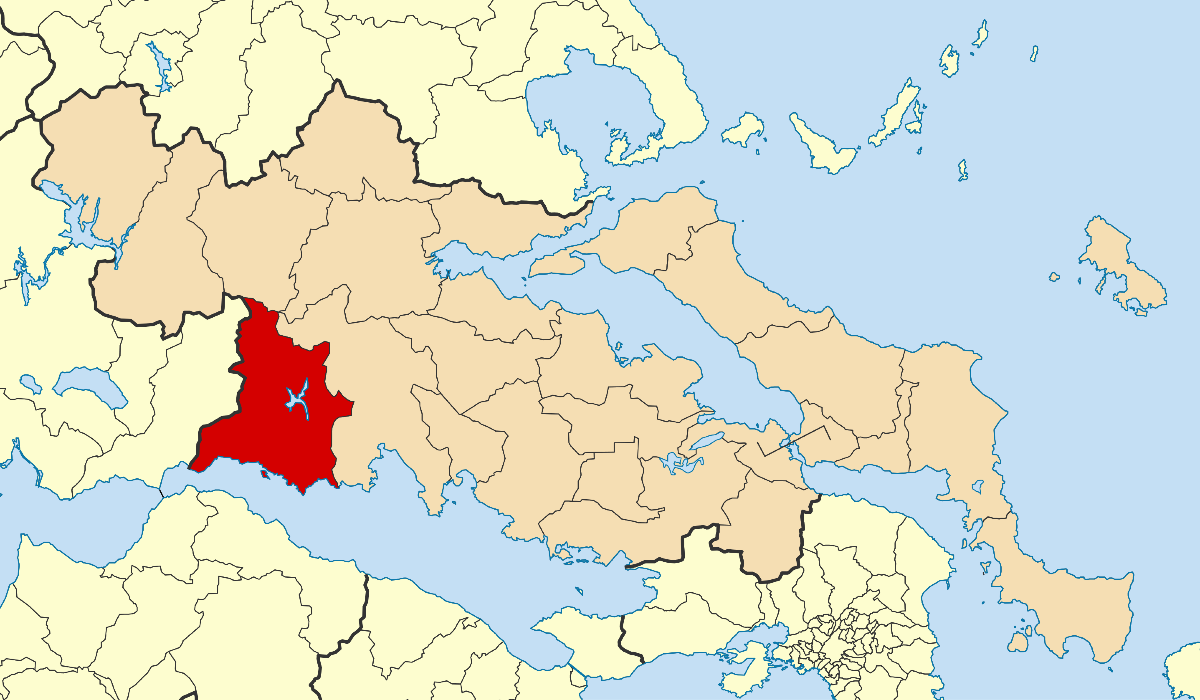

- Location within Greece
- Coordinates: 38°32′N 22°12′E
- Country: Greece
- Administrative region: Central Greece
- Regional unit: Phocis
- Seat: Lidoriki

Area
  - Municipality: 998.9 km^{2} (385.7 sq mi)

Population (2021)
  - Municipality: 12,304
  - Density: 12.32/km^{2} (31.90/sq mi)
- Time zone: UTC+2 (EET)
  - Summer (DST): UTC+3 (EEST)

Dorida (Greek: Δωρίδα) is a municipality in the Phocis regional unit of the Central Greece Region of Greece. The seat of the municipality is the town Lidoriki. It has an area of 998.893 km^{2} and a population of 12,304.

== Etymology ==
Dorida is named after the ancient region of Doris, which was inhabited by the Dorians. According to ancient Greek mythology, the name is derived from Dorus, a son of Hellen and the founder of the Dorian nation.

== Municipality ==
The municipality Dorida was formed at the 2011 local government reform by the merger of the following 4 former municipalities, that became municipal units:

- Efpalio
- Lidoriki
- Tolofon
- Vardousia

== Province ==
The province of Dorida (Greek: Επαρχία Δωρίδας) was one of the provinces of Phocis. It had the same territory as the present municipality. It was abolished in 2006.
