= Phocis =

Phocis Περιφερειακή ενότητα Φωκίδας
- Regional unit
- Municipalities of Phocis

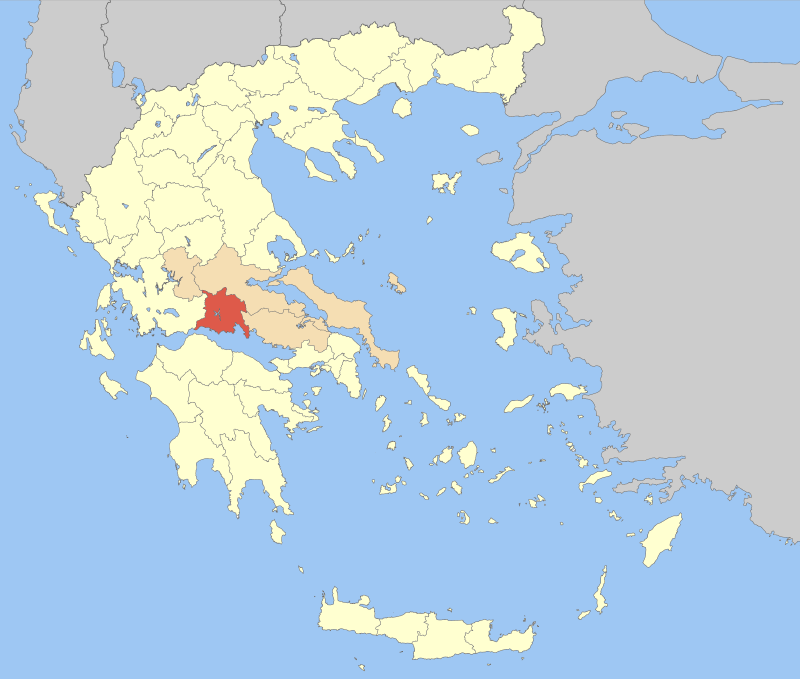
- Phocis within Greece

- Location within Greece
- Coordinates: 38°30′N 22°15′E
- Country: Greece
- Administrative region: Central Greece
- Seat: Amfissa

Area
  - Total: 2,120 km^{2} (820 sq mi)

Population (2021)
  - Total: 36,199
  - Density: 17.1/km^{2} (44.2/sq mi)
- Time zone: UTC+2 (EET)
  - Summer (DST): UTC+3 (EEST)
- Postal code: 33x xx
- Area code: 226x0, 26340
- Vehicle registration: ΑΜ
- Website: www.fokida.gr

Phocis (/ˈfoʊsɪs/; Greek: Φωκίδα [foˈciða]; Ancient Greek: Φωκίς) is one of the regional units of Greece. It is part of the administrative region of Central Greece. It stretches from the western mountainsides of Parnassus on the east to the mountain range of Vardousia on the west, upon the Gulf of Corinth. It is named after the ancient region of Phocis, but the modern regional unit also includes most of ancient Ozolian Locris and Doris.

== Geography ==
Modern Phocis has an area of 2,120 km^{2} (820 sq mi), of which 560 km^{2} (220 sq mi) are forested, 36 km^{2} (14 sq mi) are plains, and the remainder is mountainous. The massive ridge of Parnassus (2,459 m (8,068 ft), which traverses the heart of the country, divides it into two distinct portions. The neighbouring prefectures are Aetolia-Acarnania to the west, Phthiotis to the north and Boeotia to the east. It also shares a tiny border with Evrytania. Much of the south and east are deforested and rocky and mountainous while the valley runs from Itea up to Amfissa. Forests and green spaces are to the west, the central part and the north.

Its reservoir is the Mornos Dam on the Mornos river. It covers nearly 1 km to 3 km^{2}. It was completed in 1978, and the EO48 road was rerouted around the reservoir.

There are three national roads that pass through Phocis: the EO27, EO48, and the Thermopylae–Antirrio National Road: European route E65 also passes through the regional unit.

== Administration ==
=== Prefecture ===
The prefecture of Phocis was formed in 1947 from the previous Phthiotis and Phocis Prefecture. As a part of the 2011 Kallikratis government reform, a new regional unit Phocis was formed from the 1947 prefecture Phocis (Greek: Νομός Φωκίδας) without a change of territory.

=== Municipalities ===
In 2011 the regional unit Phocis was subdivided into 2 municipalities according to the table below.

New municipality	Old municipalities	Seat
Delphi (Delfoi); Map number 1	Delphi	Amfissa
Delphi (Delfoi); Map number 1	Amfissa	Amfissa
Delphi (Delfoi); Map number 1	Desfina	Amfissa
Delphi (Delfoi); Map number 1	Galaxidi	Amfissa
Delphi (Delfoi); Map number 1	Gravia	Amfissa
Delphi (Delfoi); Map number 1	Itea	Amfissa
Delphi (Delfoi); Map number 1	Kallieis	Amfissa
Delphi (Delfoi); Map number 1	Parnassos	Amfissa
Dorida; Map number 2	Efpalio	Lidoriki
Dorida; Map number 2	Lidoriki	Lidoriki
Dorida; Map number 2	Tolofon	Lidoriki
Dorida; Map number 2	Vardousia	Lidoriki

=== Former provinces ===
The pre-2011 municipalities had been organized into two provinces:

- Province of Dorida - Lidoriki
- Province of Parnassida - Amfissa

These were abolished. Provinces no longer hold any legal status in Greece.

== Demographics ==
Modern Phocis was inhabited by several Greek tribes since antiquity, mainly by Phocians, Locrians and Dorians, which were intermingled and formed the present-day Phocian population, with a unique linguistic and cultural heritage, frequently mentioned as Roumeliotes.

=== Population statistics ===
With a population of 40,343 (2001), it is one of Greece's least populous regional units, and has a population density of 19 persons per square kilometre (49 persons/mi^{2}). In the summer months, the population nearly doubles due to the influx of tourists.

Most of the villages are in the south, the southeast and the east, especially in the areas between Amfissa and Itea. The north and the west are the least populated.

== History ==
=== Greek War of Independence ===
In the Greek War of Independence, Salona was the first town of Roúmeli to revolt against the Ottomans under the leadership of Panourgias, Giannis Diovouniotis, Ioannis Gouras and its bishop Isaiah, who were in cooperation with Athanasios Diakos, Yannis Makriyannis and others originating from Phocis. On 27 March 1821, Panourgias invaded the town and on April 10 the Greeks captured the Castle of Salona, the first fortress which fell in Greek hands.

== Notable people ==
- Alexander of Phocis
- Onomarchus
- Panourgias
- Yannis Makriyannis
- Athanasios Diakos
- Isaiah of Salona
- Dimitrios Psarros
- Giannis Skarimpas (September 28, 1893 in Agia Efthymia Parnassidos – January 21, 1984)
- Nikolaos Makarezos (1919 – August 3, 2009)
- Eleni Karaindrou

== Sporting teams ==
Here are the most popular sporting teams in the prefecture. All of the teams are under the Phocis Football Clubs Association in which it existed since 1985 after the separation and dissolution of the Phocis-Phtiotis Football Guild Union.

- Androutsos Gravia - Gravia
- Apollon Efpalio - Efpalio
- Asteras Itea - Itea
- Doxa Desfina - Desfina
- Isaia Desfina - Desfina
- Diagoras Polydrosos - Polydrosos
- Dorikos Nea Dorida - Nea Dorida
- Fokikos - Amfissa
- A.O. Malesina - Malesina

== See also ==
- List of settlements in Phocis
