= Kastellia =

Kastellia Καστέλλια
- Community
- Location within Greece
- Coordinates: 38°42′N 22°25′E
- Country: Greece
- Administrative region: Central Greece
- Regional unit: Phocis
- Municipality: Delphi
- Municipal unit: Gravia
- Elevation: 450 m (1,480 ft)

Population (2021)
  - Community: 422
- Time zone: UTC+2 (EET)
  - Summer (DST): UTC+3 (EEST)
- Postal code: 330 57
- Area code: 22650
- Vehicle registration: ΑΜ
- Website: kastellia.org.gr

Kastellia (Greek: Καστέλλια, before 1979: Καστέλλι - Kastelli) is a village in the municipal unit of Gravia, Phocis, Greece. It is situated at the western end of the wide Cephissus valley, at the foot of the mountains Giona and Oeta. It is 3 km northwest of Gravia, 19 km north of Amfissa and 23 km south of Lamia. The Greek National Road 27 (Damasta - Amfissa - Itea) passes southeast of the village. The railway from Athens to Thessaloniki passes east of the village, with the nearest railway station at Bralos, 4 km east.

Kastellia has an area of app. 37,468 acres (151,630 m²) and an average altitude of 450m. The ground is semi-highland consisting of: (1) 8,914 acres of cultivated land, (2) 11,368 acres of partial-forestry land, (3) 13,925 acres of forestry quality land. The remainder is allocated for housing and roads.

The population has been steadily decreasing. The 1928 census found 1,066 inhabitants. By 1961 it had fallen to 827. By 1991 it had dropped to 779 and the latest census, in 2021, counted only 422.

== History ==
After the Trojan War the Dorians settled in the area of present Kastellia, and founded the cities Erineus, Boium, Cytinium and Pindus. In 1835, after the Greek War of Independence, Kastellia became a part of the municipality of Erineos, named after the ancient city. This municipality, part of the Parnassida Province, had 2,253 inhabitants. In 1872 the municipality was renamed to Dorieis. The municipality was dissolved on August 29, 1912 (under Law 4057/1912) and Kastellia became an independent community, with the settlement of Chlomos. In 1997 under the Kapodistrias reform, the former communities Apostolias, Gravia, Kaloskopi, Kastellia, Mariolata, Oinochori, Sklithro and Vargiani were merged into the new municipality of Gravia.

== Kastellia today ==
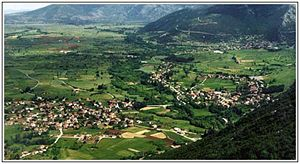
Kastellia

The town has a modern community hall where the ground floor serves as the offices of the town council and the upper floor has been converted to a six room hostel to host students and tourists. A community clinic has been constructed at a site donated in 1972 by K.I. Drosopoulos. It provides low-cost health care to local residents and also serves as the doctor’s residence. The nearest lyceum (middle school) and gymnasium (secondary school) are in Gravia.

Because of the limited agricultural activity, an agricultural and fiduciary association is being housed in a large stone building which is also used as a repository. In 1910, it operated as the mutual association, a co-op which insured against crop and livestock loss. In Chlomos it ran the Rural and Cattle Association for the same purpose. Livestock farming is limited to flocks of sheep, goats and cattle. East of town there is a modern pig farm.

There are many professional craftsmen, such as carpenters, steelworkers, electricians and plumbers. Commercial facilities include supply yards of building materials and earthmoving machinery as well as a modern unit for processing timber. For entertainment purposes there are coffee houses, cafeterias and taverns.

A large number of Kastellians live in Athens, Piraeus, Lamia, Thessaloniki, Amfissa, and Larissa, as well as abroad (mainly in America and Australia). Despite the fact that the population is shrinking, a large number of new houses are being built and many older homes are being refurbished.

== Cultural associations ==
The Progressive Association "Kastellia" which is based in Athens, was founded in 1950. Its membership is composed of Kastellians who live outside the area. The association publishes a newspaper The Kastelliotika Nea with news and events related to the town and those who have left. In each of the last 15 years the association has organized a ceremony where the young people from Kastellia who succeed in the Pan-Hellenic Examinations receive a commemorative diploma and a monetary reward. The association was founded by Ioannis Moscholios.

By a decision of the Amfissa Court (#297/87), the founding statute of the Kastellia Cultural Association was approved. Its main aims are: (1) The study and protection of the natural environment of Kastellia. (2) The rediscovery and promotion of the town's cultural heritage. (3) Improving the cultural level of the population. The cultural association organizes many cultural events in Kastellia.
