= Kanianitis =

- Native name: Κανιανίτης (Greek)

Location
- Country: Greece

Physical characteristics
- Mouth
  - location: Cephissus
  - coordinates: 38°39′07″N 22°31′22″E

Basin features
- Progression: Cephissus→ Lake Yliki

The Kanianitis (Greek: Κανιανίτης) is a river in Phocis, central Greece. It receives its water from the mountains Oeta and Giona. It flows through the villages Kastellia, Gravia and Mariolata, and flows into the Cephissus near the village Lilaia in the municipality of Parnassos. In antiquity, it was called Pindos or Pindus (Greek: Πίνδος). The Pindus was a river of ancient Phocis and Doris. The ancient cities Lilaea and Pindus were situated on the river.
