= Agia Efthymia =

Agia Efthymia Αγία Ευθυμία
- Community
- Location within Greece
- Coordinates: 38°28′N 22°21′E
- Country: Greece
- Administrative region: Central Greece
- Regional unit: Phocis
- Municipality: Delphi
- Municipal unit: Amfissa
- Lowest elevation: 470 m (1,540 ft)

Population (2021)
  - Community: 374
- Time zone: UTC+2 (EET)
  - Summer (DST): UTC+3 (EEST)
- Postal code: 331 00
- Area code: 22650
- Vehicle registration: AM
- Website: www.agiathimia.com

Agia Efthymia (Greek: Αγία Ευθυμία, [aˈʝa efθiˈmia]) is a village in the regional unit of Phocis, Greece. It is part of the municipality of Delphi, located on the foothill of Mount Giona the highest mountain of Central Greece, in the district of Parnassida in Central Greece.

== History ==
=== Classical antiquity ===
The history of Agia Efthymia can be traced back to ancient Greece, when the town was named Myonia and/or Myania. Myonia is attested by classical sources as a polis, thus it must have been a political community, one of the principal of the ancient Greek tribe of Locrians, in the region of Ozolian Locris. Ruins of the ancient defence town walls have been preserved up to now, in and around the village, as well as remains of an ancient cemetery. In 338 BC, Myonia was sacked by Philip II of Macedon along with Amfissa, because Ozolian Locrians had illegally cultivated part of the Crissaean plain which belonged to Delphi. A treaty between Myonia and Hypnia has been published, as well as a decree of Delphi in honor of a citizen of Myonia, both dating from the 2nd century BC.

The Myonians are also mentioned by Thucydides in his work History of the Peloponnesian War. Eurylochus, the Spartan general, had to pass through the land of the Ozolian Locrians on his road to Naupactus. For this reason and because he also wanted to detach the Amfissians from Athens, Eurylochus sent a herald to Amfissa as long as he had arrived at Delphi. The Amfissians, who were alarmed at the hostility of the Phocians, gave hostages to him and induced the other Locrian cities to do the same; the first of them were their neighbours, the Myonians, who held the most difficult of the passes.

Pausanias, in his work Description of Greece, refers to Myonia as a town farther inland from Amfissa and above it, thirty stades away. The town was lying upon a hill, and it had a grove and an altar sacred to the gods called Meilichioi, the sacrifices to whom were offered at night and the rule was to consume the meat on the spot before sunrise. Beyond the city, there was a precinct of Poseidon, called Poseidonium, with a temple of the god in it, but the statue had disappeared before the author's time.

In another book of the same work, Pausanias mentions that there was a bronze-plated shield in the Temple of Zeus at Olympia, adorned with paintings on the inner side, and along with the shield there were a helmet and greaves. An inscription on the armour said that they were "dedicated by the Myanians as first fruits to Zeus". He concludes that the Myanians were the same folk as the Myonians of the Locrian mainland, as he remembered the reference to the latter by Thucydides, and says that the letters on the shield were a little distorted, a fault due to the antiquity of the votive offering. Stephanus of Byzantium notes the town as Myon (Ancient Greek: Μύων).

There had been some confusion during the 19th and early 20th century in identifying the original location of ancient Myonia, mainly due to Pausanias' description of the location of the ancient town. Nevertheless, several historians and specialists on the geography of ancient Greece have identified Myonia with the modern village of Agia Efthymia, so there is no doubt about it anymore. Louis Robert, in his work Études épigraphiques et philologiques, places Myonia at Agia Efthymia, as well as The Princeton Encyclopedia of Classical Sites, Alfred Philippson, and the editors of Inscriptiones Graecae, Günther Klaffenbach and Johannes Kirchner. William Martin Leake arrives at the same conclusion and locates Myonia at Agia Efthymia on the road from Salona to Galaxidi, contradicting William Smith, who locates it on the road from Amfissa to Gravia in the Dictionary of Greek and Roman Geography.

=== Ottoman era ===
During the Ottoman occupation of Greece, Agia Efthymia held a leading role in the region of Parnassida and had one of the only three schools in Phocis, established by the teacher and monk Nikodimos Kavassilas, who was born in Agia Efthymia in 1595. He became principal of the School of Varnakova in 1648 until his death in May 1652, leaving interesting spiritual writings.

The disobedient character and resistance of the local people against the Ottoman Empire were strong and admirable. Agia Efthymia was a center of armatoloi. Around 1705 the leader was Katsonis, uncle of the hero Lambros Katsonis, who was nicknamed "Vrykolakas" meaning 'vampire', because until his death in 1740, he was so much feared by the Ottoman Turks that they left the whole territory to his jurisdiction in order to free themselves from him. The famous Greek writer Andreas Karkavitsas had dedicated to Vrykolakas a whole story called The Exarch.

Until 1821 and the Greek War of Independence, eleven massive attempts for independence took place on the Greek side, one of them headed by the Bishop of Salona, Philotheos Charitopoulos, who was born in Agia Efthymia. He, together with captain Kourmas, formed an alliance with Venetian army and navy, trying to overthrow the Ottoman domination when he was killed in the battlefield.

The man who took charge after Charitopoulos' death was his son-in-law, Kostas Zacharias, nicknamed "Konstantaras". His achievements were sung in popular folk songs. The poet Kostas Krystallis wrote the story Captain Konstantaras, in which he referred to the fact that Konstantaras killed his only left son - his other two sons had been killed by the Ottomans - with his own hands because he dishonored his family while he had been living on the island of Agios Konstantinos, opposite of Itea, where he had been sent to attend the local school. Konstantaras died in 1755 and his jurisdiction was shared to his three - second in command - men.

The tradition of the local fighters was continued by the famous fighter Astrapogiannos, who was also born in Agia Efthymia and his real name was Giannos Zacharis. Astrapogiannos was praised by popular folk songs too and the poet Aristotelis Valaoritis was inspired by Astrapogiannos' last moments after he was wounded. He wrote the poem Astrapogiannos in 1867, in which he praises the friendship between Astrapogiannos and his lieutenant, Lambetis. There was also a popular Greek film produced in 1970, titled O Astrapogiannos, dedicated to the fighter.

Other revolutionaries from Agia Efthymia who are popular in the local folk tradition are Arapogiorgos, the guerilla chief during 1750–1760, Mitros Dedousis around 1770, Georgios and Giannis Karaplis by the end of the 18th century. During the Greek War of Independence, several fighters from the village were distinguished, taking part in some of the most important battles like the battle of Gravia, the battle of Vassilika and the battle of Alamana. Among them Ioannis Kalpouzos and his son Anagnostis Kalpouzos, with the latter being killed during the battle in the region of Alamana, where he fought along with Athanasios Diakos, which made the first king of Greece Otto honor Kalpouzos family by visiting them in Agia Efthymia.

=== Modern history ===
In the history of modern Greece, many Agioefthymiotes are recorded to have taken part in the struggles against foreign powers. During the Greco-Turkish War of 1897, three men were killed in the battlefield, while in the Balkan Wars, thirteen men from Agia Efthymia lost their lives in the lines, two of which had come from the United States where they had previously migrated. Nine people died during World War I and ten at the Greek campaign to Asia Minor in 1919-1922.

During World War II, Agia Efthymia suffered heavily from the Axis powers as thirty-seven people were directly shot to death by the conquerors while the total loss of people numbered 120 individuals. On April 25, 1941, the village was bombed and its cathedral, dedicated to the "Birth of Theotokos", was damaged. On 9 April 1943, the troops of Fascist Italy burned the largest part of the village, including the church of Agios Efthymios, and, in August 1944, the troops of Nazi Germany burned the rest of it. According to official data 365 out of the total 423 houses of the village were destroyed and 20 were partial burned. The State recognized the sacrifice of the Agioefthymiotes and in 2000 Agia Efthymia was included in the list of "Towns and Villages of Martyrdom" and a monument for the people who died in World War II was erected at the entrance of the village.

== Origin of the name ==
The ancient name of the village was Myonia (Μυωνία, Μυονία), also referred to as Myania (Μυανία), and it was held until 1580, slightly altered to Mynia (Μυνιά). The name is said to come from the word mys (μυς) which means 'muscle', due to the brawniness of the men in the town.

According to the Chronicle of Galaxidi, compiled by a monk named Efthymios in 1702, a huge earthquake in 1580 destroyed several towns in Phocis like Salona (Amfissa), Galaxidi, Lidoriki and Mynia. The desperate residents of the latter left the village and went to the mountain above it crying. There an old man with a long beard appeared and told them to return to their village and not to fear because he would protect them. This old man was believed to be Saint Euthymius and actually he is always portrayed with a long beard. The residents returned to the village, rebuilt their houses and gave the name of the saint to their community, Agia Efthymia. Additionally they built a church dedicated to him.

It is interesting that Agia Efthymia is feminine and not the name of the old man. Besides there is no female saint in Christianity with this name. The prevalent explanation of why the village was named Agia Efthymia instead of Agios Efthymios, is that the inhabitants might attempt to match the name of their village Mynia, which is feminine, with the feminine name Efthymia. Indeed, nowadays this seems very sensible since the residents call their village Aithymnia which sounds very close to the ancient name Mynia.

== Archaeological finds ==
In the region, 4th century coins have been discovered, depicting, on the front side a head of Demeter with a peplos and a wreath made of wheat, whereas the rear side depicts Apollo seated, holding a branch of laurel and holding a lyre. The inscriptions bear the name of the Amphictyony.

In 1928, at Kazas, two iron swords within two graves were discovered, as well as lances and javelins and a bronze helmet of the 6th century BC, located in the Archaeological Museum of Amphissa. They present affinities with similar objects from Macedonia and northern Greece in general, a fact which may sho the Doric origin of the Locrians and the route followed by the Dorians during their descent to southern Greece.

== Modern village ==
The village is situated on the foothill of Mount Giona, the highest mountain of Southern Greece, on the site that the ancient town existed. It is about 8.5 km SW of the prefecture's capital, Amfissa, to which it is connected by the EO48 road. Agia Efthymia is also close to some popular destinations of Greek and foreign travellers: the famous archeological site of Delphi, the coastal towns Itea and Galaxidi, Parnassos Ski Center.

The residents engages mainly in agriculture, with products like the popular olives of the region, pastoralism, building, while many of them work in the bauxite mines. During the 19th and 20th century, Agia Efthymia was one of the largest villages in Parnassida and the whole of Phocis. Now the population of the village has reduced to 374 residents according to the census of 2021, although the people originating from it who visit and live there during the year, especially in summer, increase the number to more than 1,000.

Historical population

Year	Pop.	±%
1821	300	—
1835	467	+55.7%
1851	720	+54.2%
1870	1,009	+40.1%
1879	1,275	+26.4%
1896	1,510	+18.4%
1907	1,481	−1.9%
1920	1,418	−4.3%
1928	1,490	+5.1%

Year	Pop.	±%
1940	1,528	+2.6%
1951	1,173	−23.2%
1961	1,087	−7.3%
1971	851	−21.7%
1981	670	−21.3%
1991	756	+12.8%
2001	429	−43.3%
2011	452	+5.4%
2021	374	−17.3%

== Culture ==
Today there is the "Union of the Athens, Piraeus and Environs Agioefthymiotes", founded in 1957 by descendants of the village's people who live in Athens, which keeps its society in the Greek capital close to Agia Efthymia and publishes a newspaper which goes to around 1,600 households in and outside of Greece. In 1921 the "Agioefthymiotes Myonia - Mutual Support Society" was established in New York City by the local numerous society of immigrants from Agia Efthymia.

Giannis Skarimpas, a popular writer, was born and raised in Agia Efthymia, descended from a well-known local family which had taken part in the Greek War of Independence. Each year the society of the village organizes a series of cultural events called "Skarimpeia", dedicated to the writer. Ioanna Glymi, a professional painter who had taken part in various contests in Paris, also descended from Agia Efthymia and left to the community approximately 100 of her paintings. Other distinguished people who descended from the village were the hero of the Greek War of Independence Astrapogiannos, the painter Georgios Kalamaras and - as it is said -the popular folkloric personality Maria Pentagiotissa.

== Bibliography ==
=== Primary sources ===
- Pausanias, Description of Greece, online at Perseus Project
- Thucydides, History of the Peloponnesian War, online at Perseus Project

=== Secondary sources ===
- Habicht, Christian (1998). Pausanias' Guide to Ancient Greece. University of California Press. ISBN 0-520-06170-5.
- Hansen, Mogens Herman; Nielsen, Thomas Heine (2004). An inventory of archaic and classical poleis. Oxford University Press. ISBN 0-19-814099-1.
- Leake, William Martin (1835). Travels in Northern Greece. J. Rodwell.
- Leake, William Martin (1857). On some disputed questions of ancient geography. John Murray, London.
- Robert, Louis (1938). Études épigraphiques et philologiques. Champion.
- Smith, William (1857). Dictionary of Greek and Roman geography. Walton and Maberly.
- Stillwell, Richard; MacDonald, William L.; McAllister, Marian Holland (1976). The Princeton Encyclopedia of Classical Sites.
