= Drymaea =

Town of ancient Phocis

Coordinates: 38°42′18″N 22°32′29″E

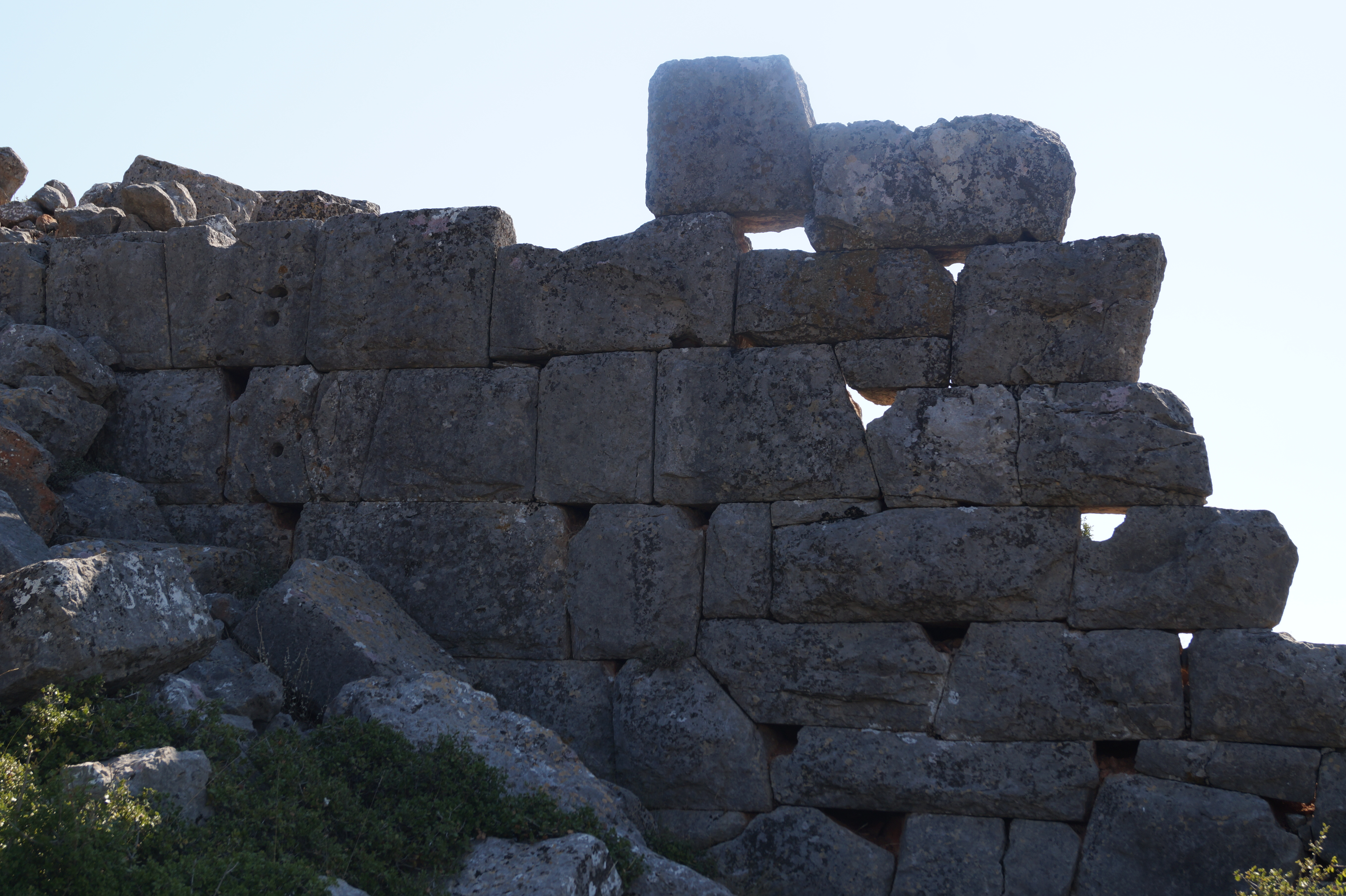
Some remains of the walls of Drymaea.

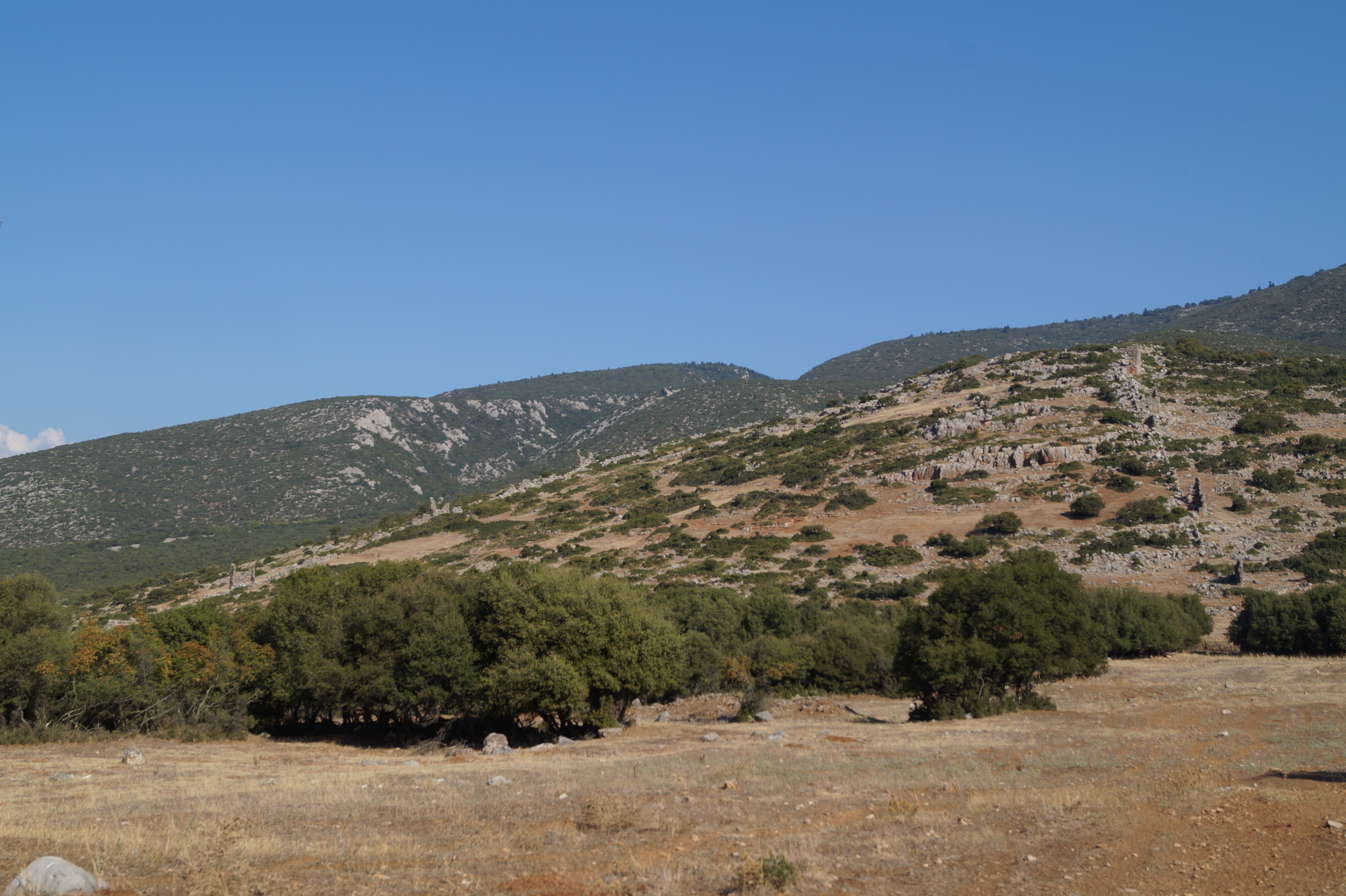
Drymaea, view from the south.

Drymaea or Drymaia (Ancient Greek: Δρυμαία) or Drymus or Drymos (Δρύμος) or Drymea or Drymia (Δρυμία) or Drymiae was a frontier town of ancient Phocis, on the side of Doris, whence it is included in the limits of Doris by Livy. Pausanias describes it as 80 stadia from Amphicleia: but this number appears to be an error of the copyists, since in the same passage he says that Amphicleia was only 15 stadia from Tithronium, and Tithronium 15 stadia from Drymaea, which would make Drymaea only 30 stadia from Amphicleia. He also speaks of an ancient temple of Demeter at Drymaea, containing an upright statue of the goddess in stone, in whose honour the annual festival of the Thesmophoria was celebrated. Its more ancient name is said to have been Nauboleis (Ναυβολεῖς), which was derived from Naubolus, an ancient Phocian hero, father of Iphitus.

It was one of the Phocian towns destroyed in the Greco-Persian Wars by the army of Xerxes I in 480 BCE. In 348/7 BCE, it was destroyed in the Third Sacred War and the inhabitants settled in nearby villages. During the First Macedonian War, Philip V of Macedon conquered the town in 208 BCE.

The site of Drymaea is near the modern village of Glunitsa (renamed Drymaia in 1915). William Martin Leake visited the site in the 19th century and noted that is indicated by some ruins, situated midway between Kamares and Glunista, and occupying a rocky point of the mountain on the edge of the plain. "Some of the towers remain nearly entire. The masonry is generally of the third order, but contains some pieces of the polygonal kind; the space enclosed is a triangle, of which none of the sides is more than 250 yards (230 m). At the summit is a circular acropolis of about 2 acres (0.81 ha), preserving the remains of an opening into the town".
