= Pindos (disambiguation) =

Pindos or Pindus is the largest mountain range in Greece, extending to southern Albania.

Pindos or Pindus can also refer to:

- from the mountain range :

- Pindos Pony
- Pindos (municipality), in Thessaly

- Pindus (city), an ancient city in Doris, Greece

- Pindos or Pindus (Greek: Πίνδος), the ancient name of river Kanianitis in Doris, Greece

- Principality of the Pindus, an attempt to create an autonomous entity for the Aromanian population of Samarina and other villages of the Pindus mountains of Northern Greece
- Pindus (mythology), a character in Greek mythology
- Greek destroyer Pindos, World War II-era warship
- Pindos (slur) (Russian: пиндос) is a derogatory nickname for a citizen or inhabitant of the United States ("Pindostan")
