= Kaloskopi =

Kaloskopi Καλοσκοπή
- Community
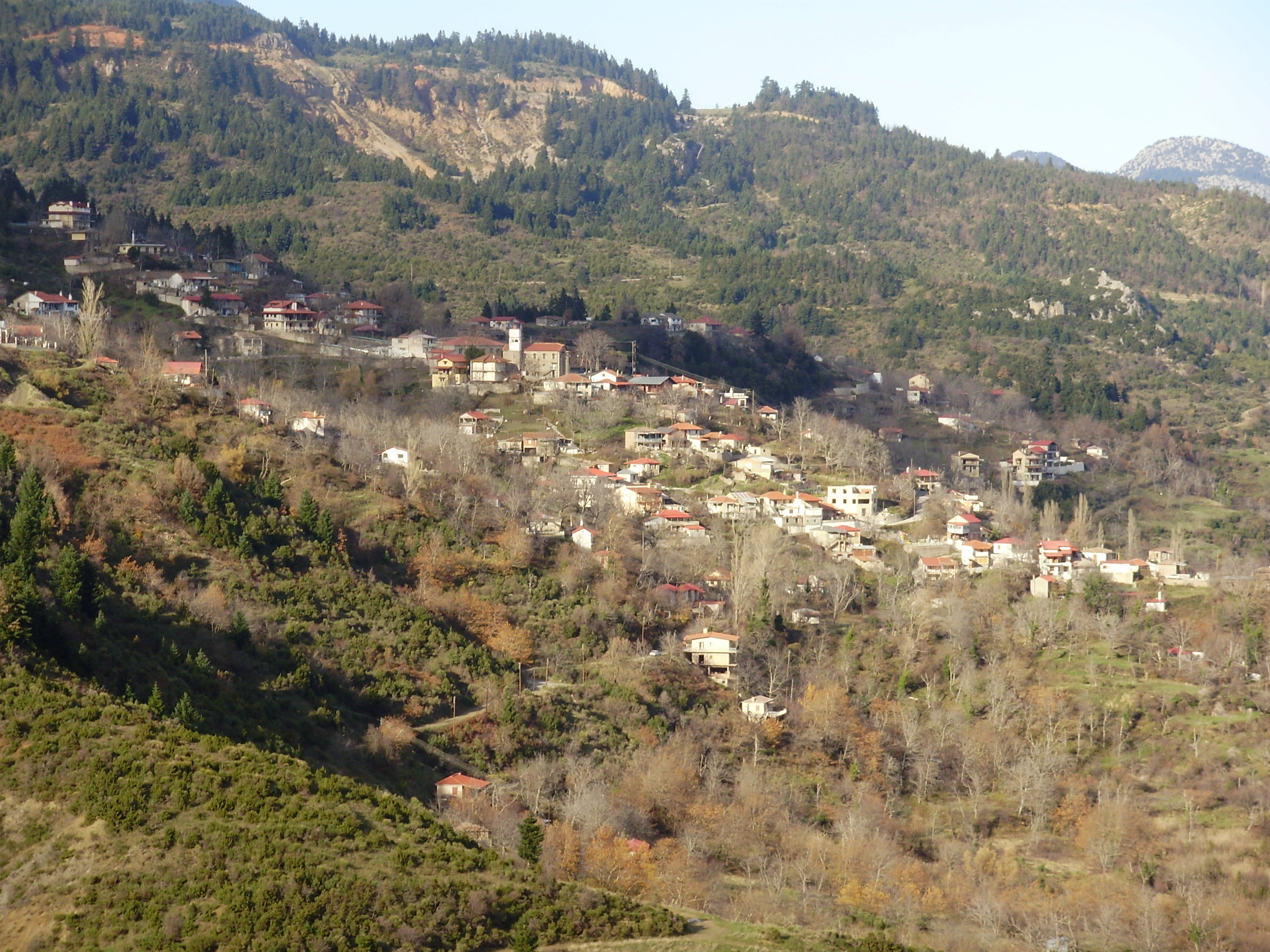

- Location within Greece
- Coordinates: 38°41′N 22°19′E
- Country: Greece
- Administrative region: Central Greece
- Regional unit: Phocis
- Municipality: Delphi
- Municipal unit: Gravia

Population (2021)
  - Community: 346
- Time zone: UTC+2 (EET)
  - Summer (DST): UTC+3 (EEST)
- Vehicle registration: ΑΜ

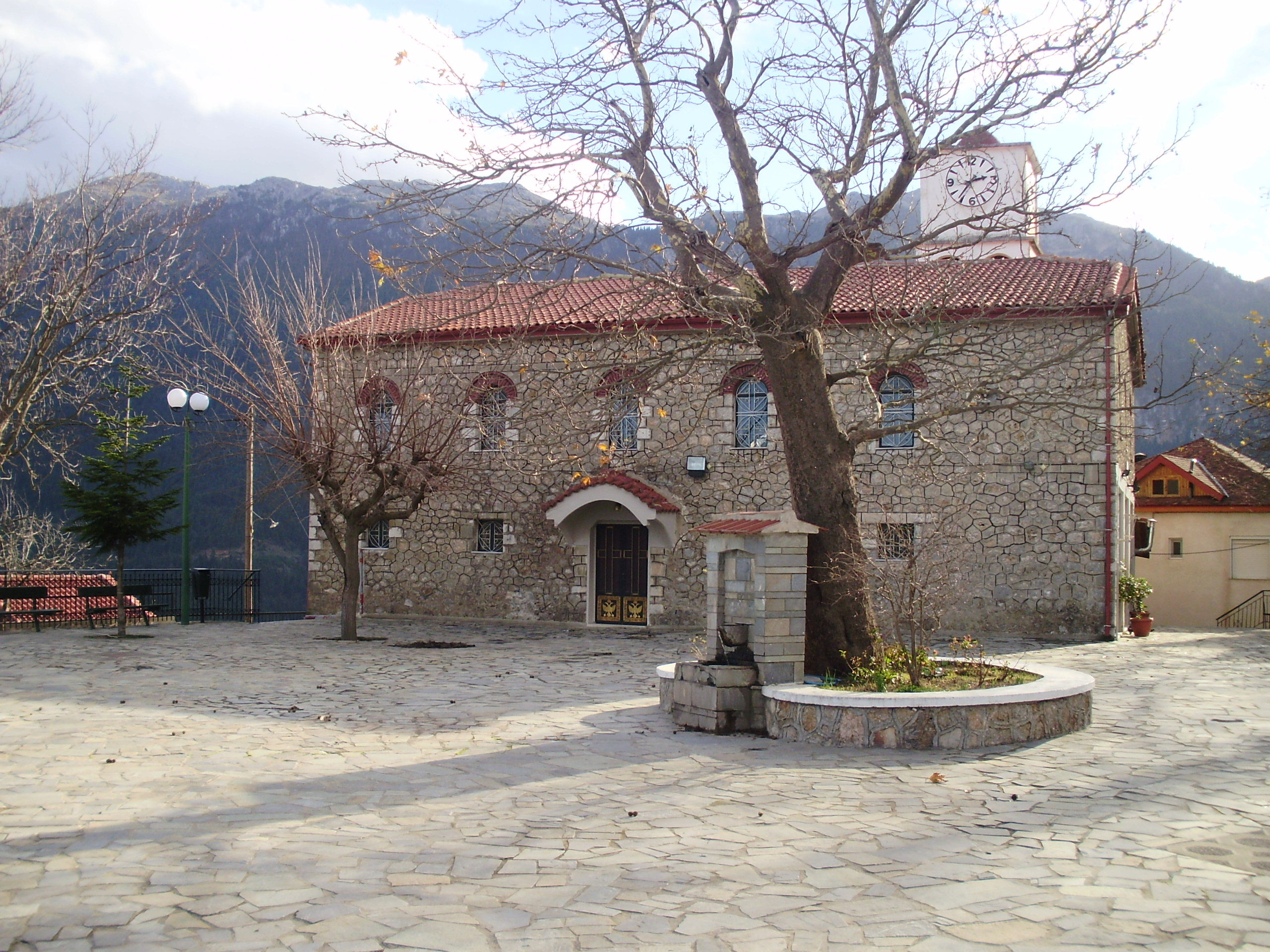
Central square

Kaloskopi (Greek: Καλοσκοπή, before 1927: Κουκουβίστα - Koukouvista) is a mountain village in the municipal unit of Gravia, northeastern Phocis, Greece. It is situated in the northeastern foothills of Mount Giona, 8 km west of Kastellia and 19 km north of Amfissa.

== Population ==
Year	Population
1981	299
1991	334
2001	228
2011	358
2021	346

== Location ==
The village is located in the middle of a dense fir forest, while on the south side it seems that the forest of the hill of Lyritsa with the plane trees, walnuts, oaks, cherries and apple trees completes the green landscape. Nestled at the foot of Gkiona, the village is surrounded by Mount Kallidromo in the east, Vardousia in the west, Oiti in the north and Parnassos in the south. Kaloskopi has plenty of spring water that overflows the stone-curved founts and irrigates the gardens of the houses.

Kaloskopi is accessible by Phocis Provincial Road 5, about 13.5 kilometres (8.4 miles) north west from the EO27 road, by train from Bralos station, and then by taxi or bus only from Amfissa and Lamia.

== History ==
7th Century - 14th Century

The original name of Kaloskopi was Koukouvista, a name that is Slavic and means "Cuckoo's Nest" because it was located in the dense spine on the mountain slope of the highest ridge. The first settlement of Kaloskopi occurred in the 7th century, when the Slavic tribes descended into the Greek territory. As a result, the indigenous population moved to Kaloskopi where nomadic settlements already existed, in order to protect themselves from invaders. The middle of the 14th century was followed by the descent of the Serbs. The name Koukouvista was given during the first or second Slavic invasion.

1450-1800

The first houses of the village were built in the area of Ai Nikolas, where you can currently find vineyards, and they were huts covered with clay. According to the Ottoman census of 1456, 78 hearths were recorded in Koukouvista. There is also another reference to Koukouvista that was made in 1704, when there was a dispute between the people of Koukouvista and the people of Segditsa regarding the ownership of the meadow of the Gkiona saddle mountain. The Ottoman judges sided with the people of Koukouvista and finally gave them the ownership of the pasture of the Giona saddle mountain. In 1750, an unknown but serious epidemic broke out and it almost decimated the population.

1800-1900

Puckeville, the French traveller, stated in his book Travels in Greece (1820) that Koukouvista had 75 families. During the Greek Revolution of 1821, the contribution of Koukouvista was important to fighters, with Papandrias (Papandreas Moris) being the one who led the way fighting next to Athanasios Diakos in the Battle of Alamana and Odysseas Androutsos at the Hani of Gravia who participated in the battle of Vassilika, Fthiotida. In the area of Koukouvista called Polemistra, the militants fortified themselves with Papandrias and the Kontogiannis and set up an ambush on the Turks who had earlier burned the huts of the people of Koukouvista. At the area of Koukouvista called Mnemata, people of Dermissa, Agoriani and Koukouvista, led by Gouras and Papandrias, clashed with the Turks, defeated them and buried the dead there. Then, at the Traka site, Komnas Trakas destroyed the enemy remnants who tried to escape.

1900-2020

In 1927, owing to the law on the change of Slavic local names, the name Koukouvista was changed to Kaloskopi, as had been suggested by the teacher Giannis Laiou. The name Kaloskopi has to do with the Good View of the village and because of this view the place is often referred to as "the Balcony of Giona".

Kaloskopi was badly damaged during the German occupation. The contribution of the village to the resistance struggle is worth mentioning, as well as the large number of fighters that died during that period. On August 15, 1942 in Kaloskopi, Aris Velouchiotis took an oath with Papamiltos in the ELAS team. Kaloskopi came against the conquerors in frequent raids and bombings and it was a Martyr village. The village was burned down twice in the same year by the German occupiers, at Easter and in August 1944. The ensuing civil war also left its mark on Kaloskopi. The inhabitants were displaced for three years, while in October 1947 a clash took place in the village between sections of the Democratic Army of Greece and the Mountain Commando Unit. At that time, many locals emigrated abroad (America, Australia) or to large urban centers (Athens, Lamia, Thessaloniki) in search of better living conditions.

Kaloskopi stands on a slope of Mount Gkiona and is sometimes called “the balcony of Gkiona” for its views. Traditional stone buildings remain in the village alongside newer houses. Kaloskopi receives visitors, including mountaineering groups, particularly in summer and winter. It has a small permanent population, which increases during holidays and the summer as people with ties to the village return.

== Sights ==
Founts

Kaloskopi is known for the water which runs from its traditional founts and springs. The main spring of Kaloskopi is called Kefalovrysso and it is located near the village. In the village there are fifteen founts. These are Krya Vrisi, Skaperda, Barbessi, Panagia, Potimi, Agora, Pap'laki, the fount of the central square, Motsio, Zougrou, Stavros, the one at the Community Office, Kakot'rahi - Cemetery, that of Tsagaris, and the one in Moraitika - Martsian - Avgerinaika.

Agia Paraskevi

The path to Agia Paraskevi begins in the neighborhood of Ai-Giannaki, in the last houses of the village. The route is about 1.5 km long among dense vegetation and it is ideal for hiking. However, the area is also accessible by car if you take the road after Kefalovrysso.

Kefalovrysso

Kefalovrysso is a source of life for the village, but also for the villages of the whole plain. It is one of the springs of the Boeotian Kifissos and we can find it while crossing the road that connects Kaloskopi with Oinochori. Next to Kefalovrysso one can visit the chapel of Agia Eleni. Under the huge fir trees, there are benches and a stone fount for relaxation.

Agia Triada

6 km far from the village on the way to Pavliani, one can find the location of Agia Triada with the homonymous chapel and many old plane trees. The location is suitable for day trips as well as for mountain camping. A few meters after the church there is a monument dedicated to the victims of the national resistance (1944) against the German occupation where a memorial service is held every year on the Holy Trinity eve with the participation of many organizations and associations.

Mega Rema

The path to Mega Rema begins on the south of Kaloskopi and, particularly, from the area called Stroggylo. The route is downhill through ferns and wet vegetation. The arched stone bridge is impressive and the rapid waters of Giona carve the existing stones and rocks. Continuing from Mega Rema (in parallel to the old road) the path leads to the Hani of Zaganas. It used to function as an inn for the conductors who were travelling to Amfissa. Today, during the summer months, there is a food and coffee shop that operates all day in a forest full of plane trees and next to the running water.

Traka

Moving to the west of the village, going up to Gkiona (by road), one can reach its slope called Traka. It is a small plateau with age-old fir trees, rich flora and impressive view. There is a spring with running water and if one visits it until June, one will come across flocks of sheep. It is ideal for mountain camping, getaways to the surrounding mountain peaks, tea picking and daily picnics.

== Outdoor Activities ==
Hunting

There is a controlled hunting zone around the village, which was created in 1995 and covers an area of 240,000 acres. Kaloskopi is located in the center of this area which is organized according to the standards of predator-prey economics and is constantly enriched with prey. Those interested in issuing a hunting license in the area should contact the Amfissa Forest Service.

Gkiona is an important habitat with rare flora and important fauna, while the presence of the Cephalonica fir trees at a height of 600–1800 m and that of the oak trees is predominant on the slopes of the high ridge. In addition, in some areas, there are a wide variety of shrubs and plants. These include wildflowers, aromatic mountain tea and amaranth, the flower that has been mentioned in traditional Greek songs.

The slopes are the natural and local habitat of the wild goat. Apart from the wild goat, the area's fauna includes foxes, weasels, ferrets, badgers, hares, snow voles, wild boars and wolves that sporadically appear in the area. The wildcat, the deer and the jackal are still preserved in Gkiona and the rumours regarding footprints of bears that have descended to the south are not uncommon. There is also a wide variety of birds, such as vultures, partridges, woodpeckers, peacocks, crows and cuckoos that seem to have found shelter in Gkiona.

Mountain Climbing/Hiking/Trekking

As the village is situated on a slope, its surrounding area seems to be a climbing, hiking and trekking paradise. There are numerous trails of varied difficulty levels that make Kaloskopi a destination for mountaineering clubs of all ages. Here is a list of some hiking/trekking gems hidden in the dense vegetation of the area:

Trail	Distance	Approximate Time	Difficulty Level
Kaloskopi (Kakotrahi) - Kefalovrysso - Vryzes	6 km	2 hours 10'	Medium
Kaloskopi - Agia Paraskevi (potentially circular)	1,7 km	50'	Easy
Kaloskopi - Mega Rema - Kotroni - Kalosopi (circular)	6,57 km	2 hours 20'	Easy
Mnemata - Fterolakka - Kakia Skala - Diaselo	5,7 km	3 hours 20'	Hard

== Cultural Center of Kaloskopi ==
The Cultural Center of Kaloskopi has been operating since 2004 and houses the Folklore Museum of Kaloskopi with a permanent exhibition that presents objects of the early 20th century. These objects have been collected mainly from donations by the residents and they highlight the struggle for life and are testimonies of the local tradition and culture. The Cultural Center of Kaloskopi also organizes walks, visits and presentations with an eye to highlighting the flora and fauna of the place but also the traditional technology of the place, with visits to old water mills, watermills, tile kilns and traditional workshops.

== See also ==
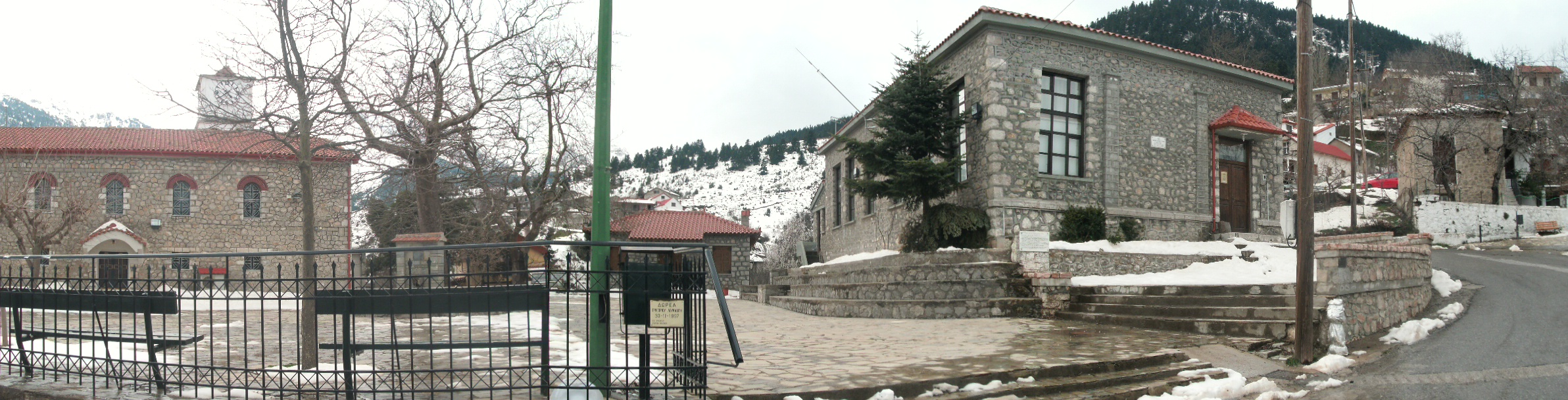
Panorama Kaloskopi main square
- List of settlements in Phocis
