= Boium =

Ancient Greek city

Coordinates: 38°41′01″N 22°25′38″E

Boium or Boion (Ancient Greek: Βοιόν) was a town and polis (city-state) of Doris, and one of the original towns of the Doric Tetrapolis (along with Pindus, Cytinium, and Erineus). According to Andron of Halicarnassus, the founders of these cities were coming from an area that was also called Doris, in Thessaly, and that was also called Histiaeotis. Thucydides writes that during First Peloponnesian War, about the year 458 or 457 BCE, the Phocians attacked the cities of Boium, Erineus and Cytinium in Doris. The Lacedemonians came to their defense, with troops commanded by Nicomedes of Sparta and forced the Phocians to retreat.

Boium's site is near the modern Gravia.
