= Doris (Greece) =

Coordinates: 38°41′N 22°26′E

Doris Δωρίς
- Region of Ancient Greece
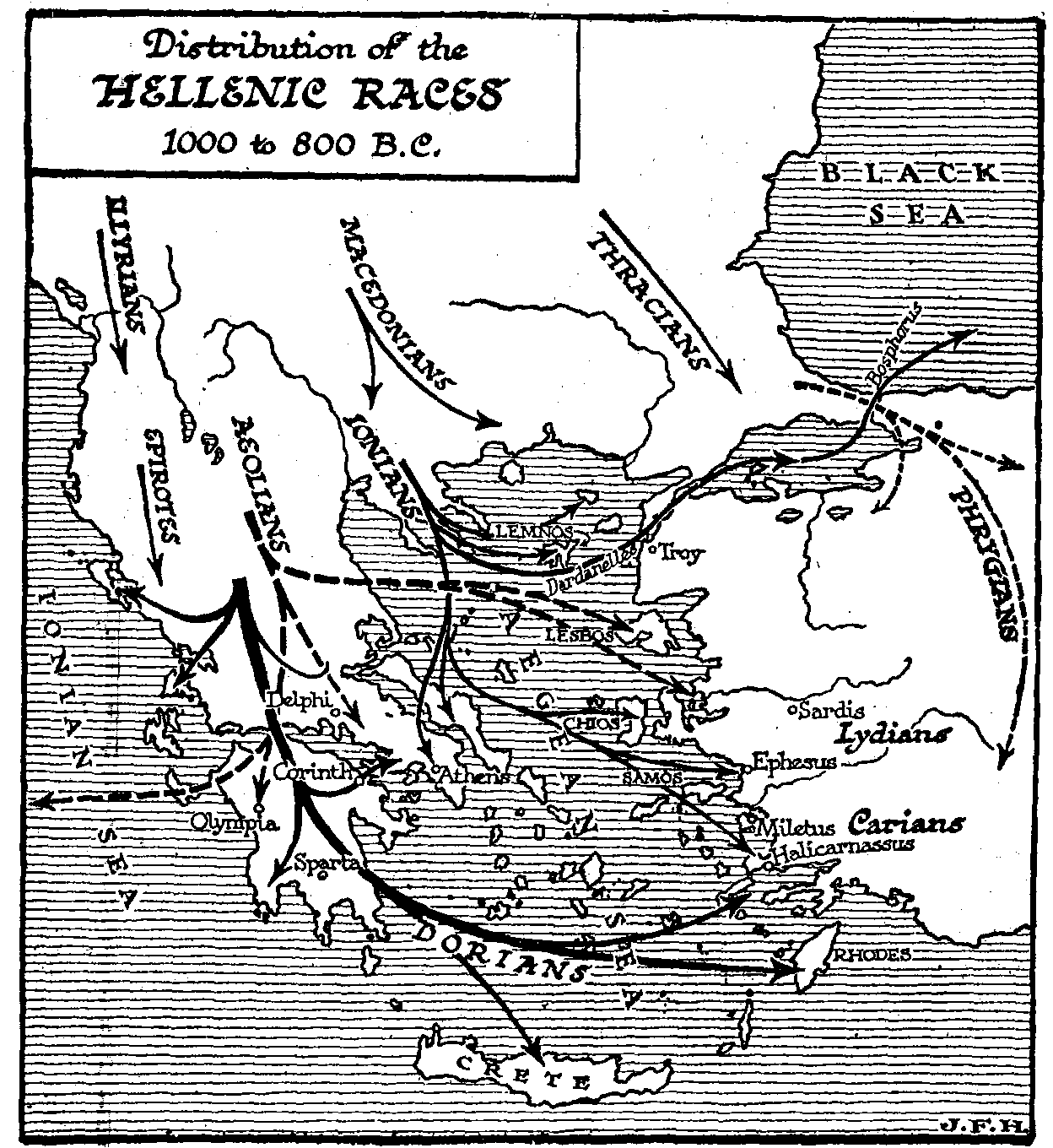
- Hypothetical map of the "Dorian invasion" of the Peloponnese

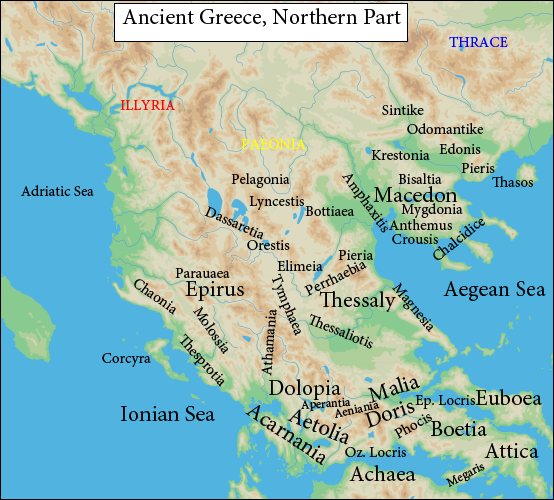
- Map showing Doris in relation to other regions
- Location: Central Greece
- Major cities: The Doric Tetrapolis
- Dialects: Doric

Doris (Greek: ἡ Δωρίς, pl. Δωριῆς, Δωριεῖς; Latin: Dores, Dorienses) was a small mountainous district in ancient Greece, bounded by Aetolia, southern Thessaly, the Ozolian Locris, and Phocis. It is the original homeland of the Dorian Greeks. It lies between Mounts Oeta and Parnassus, and consists of the valley of the river Pindus (Πίνδος), a tributary of the Cephissus, into which it flows not far from the sources of the latter. The Pindus is now called the Apostoliá. This valley is open towards Phocis; but it lies higher than the valley of the Cephissus, rising above the towns of Drymaea, Tithronium, and Amphicaea, which are the last towns in Phocis.

== Geography ==
Doris is described by Herodotus (viii. 31) as lying between Malis and Phocis, and being only 30 stadia in breadth, which agrees nearly with the extent of the valley of the Apostoliá in its widest part. The Doric Tetrapolis (Greek: Δωρική Τετράπολις) comprised a set of four closely situated cities in the valley of the Pindus River in this region of ancient Greece. The four cities were Erineus, Boium, Cytinium, and Pindus, also called Akyphas. Erineus, as the most important, appears to have been also called Dorium. The Dorians, however, did not confine themselves within these narrow limits, but occupied other places along Mount Oeta. Thus Strabo describes the Dorians of the tetrapolis as the larger part of the nation (ix. p. 417); and the Scholiast on Pindar speaks of six Doric towns: Erineus, Cytinium, Boium, Lilaeum, Carphaea, and Dryope. Some have thought Lilaeum (Lilaea) to have been a Doric town in the time of the Persian invasion, since it is not mentioned among the Phocian towns destroyed by Xerxes; however, modern scholarship based on numismatic and epigraphic evidence contradicts that view. Carphaea is probably Scarphea near Thermopylae, and Dryope is probably the country once inhabited by the Dryopes. The Dorians would appear at one time to have extended across Mount Oeta to the sea coast, both from the preceding account and from the statement of Scylax, who speaks (p. 24) of Λιμοδωριεῖς. Among the Doric towns Hecataeus mentioned Amphanae, called Amphanaea by Theopompus. Livy (xxvii. 7) places in Doris Tritonon and Drymiae, which are evidently the Phocian towns elsewhere called Tithronium and Drymaea. There was an important mountain pass leading across Parnassus from Doris to Amphissa in the country of the Ozolian Locrians; at the head of this pass stood the Dorian town of Cytinium.

Doris is said to have been originally called Dryopis from its earlier inhabitants the Dryopes, who were expelled from the country by Heracles and the Malians. It derived its name from the Dorians, who migrated from this district to the conquest of Peloponnesus. Hence the country is called the Metropolis of the Peloponnesian Dorians; and the Lacedaemonians, as the chief state of Doric origin, on more than one occasion sent assistance to the metropolis when attacked by the Phocians and their other neighbours.

== Origin of the name ==
The name "Dorians" is supposed to have derived from Dorus, the son of Hellen. According to one tradition, Dorus settled once in the country subsequently known as Doris; but other traditions represent them as more widely spread in earlier times. Herodotus relates (i. 56) that in the time of king Deucalion they inhabited the district of Phthiotis; that in the time of Dorus, the son of Hellen, they inhabited the country called Histiaeotis at the foot of Ossa and Olympus; that, expelled from Histiaeotis by the Cadmeians, they dwelt on Mount Pindus, and were called the Makednon ethnos; and that from thence they migrated to Dryopis; and having passed from Dryopis into the Peloponnesus, they were called the Doric race. For this statement Herodotus could have had no other authority than tradition, and there is therefore no reason for accepting it as an historical relation of facts, as many modern scholars have done. In the Bibliotheca Dorus is represented as occupying the country across the Peloponnese, on the opposite side of the Corinthian Gulf, and calling the inhabitants after himself Dorians. By this description is evidently meant the whole country along the northern shore of the Corinthian gulf, comprising Aetolia, Phocis, and the land of the Ozolian Locrians. This statement, according to Smith, is at least more suitable to the facts attested by historical evidence than the legends given in Herodotus. It is impossible to believe that the inhabitants of such an insignificant district as Doris Proper conquered the greater part of Peloponnesus; and the common tale that the Dorians crossed over from Naupactus to the conquest is in accordance with the legend of their being the inhabitants of the northern shore of the gulf.

== History ==
In the historical period the whole of the eastern and southern parts of the Peloponnese were in the possession of the Dorians. Starting at the isthmus of Corinth, there were first Megara, the territory of which extended north of the isthmus from the Saronic to the Corinthian gulf; next came Corinth, and to its west Sicyon; south of these two cities were Phlius and Cleonae: the Argolic peninsula was divided between Argos, Epidaurus, Troezen, and Hermione, the last of which, however, was inhabited by Dryopes, and not by Dorians. In the Saronic gulf, Aegina was peopled by Dorians. South of the Argive territory was Laconia, and to its west Messenia, both ruled by Dorians: the river Neda, which separated Messenia from Triphylia, included under Elis in its widest sense, was the boundary of the Dorian states on the western side of the peninsula. The districts just mentioned are represented in the Homeric poems as the seats of the great Achaean monarchies, and there is no allusion in these poems to any Doric population in Peloponnesus. In fact the name of the Dorians occurs only once in Homer, and then as one of the many tribes of Crete. The silence of Homer indicates that the Dorian conquest of Peloponnesus must have taken place subsequent to the time of the poet, and consequently must be assigned to a much later date than the one usually attributed to it.

From the Peloponnesus the Dorians spread over various parts of the Aegean and its connected seas. Doric colonies were founded in mythical times in the islands of Crete, Melos, Thera, Rhodes, Cos, and ancient Doris (located on the southwest coast of modern Turkey). About the same time they founded upon the coast of Caria the towns of Cnidus and Halicarnassus: these two towns, together with Cos and the three Rhodian towns of Lindus, Ialysus, and Camirus, formed a confederation usually called the Doric Hexapolis. The members of this hexapolis were accustomed to celebrate a festival, with games, on the Triopian promontory near Cnidus, in honour of the Triopian Apollo; the prizes in those games were brazen tripods, which the victors had to dedicate in the temple of Apollo; and Halicarnassus was struck out of the league, because one of her citizens carried the tripod to his own house instead of leaving it in the temple. The hexapolis thus became a pentapolis.

The Doric colonies founded numerous further colonies in historic times. Corinth, the chief commercial city of the Dorians, colonised Corcyra, and planted several colonies on the western coast of Greece, of which Ambracia, Anactorium, Leucas, and Apollonia were the most important. Epidamnus, further north, was also a Doric colony, being founded by the Corcyraeans. In Sicily we find several powerful Doric cities: Syracuse, founded by Corinth; the Hyblaean Megara, by Megara; Gela, by Rhodians and Cretans; Zancle, subsequently peopled by Messenians, and hence called Messene; Agrigentum, founded by Gela; and Selinus, by the Hyblaean Megara. In southern Italy there was the great Doric city of Tarentum, founded by the Lacedaemonians. In the eastern seas there were also several Doric cities: Potidaea, in the peninsula of Chalcidice, founded by Corinth; and Selymbria, Chalcedon, and Byzantium, all three founded by Megara.

During the invasion of Xerxes, Doris submitted to the Persians, and consequently its towns were spared. Doris was one of the oldest members of the Delphic Amphictyony and, according to Thucydides, it was an important and strategic region already 25 years before the Peloponnesian War, the first time when the Phocaeans and the Lacedaemonians first clashed against each other, the former as invaders and the latter as protectors of the Doric capital Kytinion. In the 3rd century BC the Doric Tetrapolis joined the Aetolian League. Subsequently, as we have already seen, they were assisted by the Lacedaemonians, when attacked by the more powerful Phocians and neighbouring tribes. Their towns suffered much in the Phocian, Aetolian, and Macedonian wars, so that it was a wonder to Strabo that any trace of them was left in the Roman times. (Strab. ix. p. 427.) The towns continued to be mentioned by Pliny

In the 6th century AD the ancient Voion is probably the only one of the cities of the Doric Tetrapolis still mentioned in the Synecdemus of Hierocles.

== Modern administrative region ==
The municipality of Dorida is named after the ancient region. Prior to the 2006 local government reform it was a province of the same name, encompassing the same area as the municipality.

== Sources ==
- Rousset, Denis (2015). "Microfederalism in Central Greece: the Dorians and Oitaians". In Beck, Hans; Funke, Peter (eds.). Federalism in Greek Antiquity. Cambridge: Cambridge University Press. pp. 222–230. ISBN 978-0-521-19226-2.
