= Gravia (disambiguation) =

Gravia may refer to:

places in Greece (Greek
Γραβιά):

- Gravia, Arta, a village in the Arta regional unit
- Gravia, Karditsa, a village in the Karditsa regional unit
- Gravia, Preveza, a village in the Preveza regional unit
- Gravia, a town in Phocis

other use

- Gravia (crustacean), an extinct crustacean genus in the order Palaeocopida
