= Erineus (city) =

Town and city-state in ancient Doris

Coordinates: 38°41′47″N 22°24′36″E

Erineus or Erineos (Ancient Greek: Ἐρινεός), also known as Erineum or Erineon (Ἐρινεόν) was a town and polis (city-state) in ancient Doris, one of the towns of the Doric Tetrapolis (along with Pindus, Cytinium, and Boium). According to Andron of Halicarnassus, the founders of these cities were coming from an area that was also called Doris, in Thessaly, and that was also called Histiaeotis. It is described by Strabo as lying below the town of Pindus; it probably stood upon the river of the latter name. Recounting the ships in the Battle of Salamis, Herodotus notes the contingents of the Peloponnese, saying that the Dorians and Macedonians were originally from Pindus, Erineus, and Dryopis. Thucydides writes that during First Peloponnesian War, about the year 458 or 457 BCE, the Phocians attacked the cities of Boium, Erineus and Cytinium in Doris. The Lacedemonians came to their defense, with troops commanded by Nicomedes of Sparta and forced the Phocians to retreat.

According to Tyrtaeus, Erineus is the town from which the Spartans originally came.

Its location within what is now the town of Kastellia (Καστέλλια), Greece.

== Sources ==
- STOA
