= Giannis Skarimpas =

Giannis Skarimpas, Giannis Skarimbas, or Yiannis Skarimbas (Greek: Γιάννης Σκαρίμπας; September 28, 1893 – January 21, 1984), was a Greek writer, dramatist, and poet.

== Biography ==
He was born in Agia Efthymia near Amfissa (now part of the Delphi municipality). He went to school in Aigio and Patras, went through military service in the 5/42 Evzone Regiment and was then appointed head of the customs office at Eretria (then called Nea Psara). In 1915 he resettled to Chalkida, where he spent most of his life. He had his first works published in newspapers in Athens and Chalkida under the pen name Kallis Esperinos (Κάλλις Εσπερινός). His first publication under his own name came in 1929, when he published his novel O Kapetan Sourmelis o Stouraitis (Ο καπετάν Σουρμελής ο Στουραΐτης Ω) in the Ellinika Grammata (Greek Letters) magazine. He died on January 21, 1984, in Chalkida.

== Works ==
- Kaimoi sto Griponisi (Καημοί στο Γριπονήσι), collected stories, 1930
- Mariampas (Μαριάμπας), novel, 1935
- To Solo tou Figaro (Το σόλο του Φίγκαρω, Το σόλο του Figaro = Figaro's Solo), novel, 1938
- Eaftoulides (Εαυτούληδες), poem, 1950
- O Ichos tou Kodonos (Ο ήχος του κώδωνος), stage play, 1950
- I Peripolos Z (Η περίπολος Ζ), chronicle from the First World War, 1972
- To Waterloo Dyo Geloion (Το Βατερλώ δύο γελοίων), novel 1959
- I Mathitevomeni Ton Takounion (Η μαθητευομένη των τακουνιών), three novellas, 1961
- Fygi Pros ta Empros (Φυγή προς τα εμπρός), novel 1976
- Voidangeloi (Βοϊδάγγελοι), poem 1968
- Apantes Stichoi (Άπαντες στίχοι), poem 1970
- O Sevalie Servan tis Kyrias (Ο Σεβαλιέ σερβάν της Κυρίας), stage play, 1971
- To '21 kai i Alitheia, I Trapoula, Oi Galatades (Το '21 και η αλήθεια, Η Τράπουλα, Οι Γαλατάδες), history 1971 - 1977
- Tyflovdomada sti Chalkida (Τυφλοβδομάδα στη Χαλκίδα), work 1973
- Treis Adeies Karekles (Τρεις άδειες καρέκλες = Three Empty Chairs), work 1976
- Ta Poulia me to Lasticho (Τα πουλιά με το λάστιχο), chronography, 1978
- Ta Kangouro (Τα Καγκουρώ), stage play, 1979
- Spazokefalies ston Ourano (Σπαζοκεφαλιές στον ουρανό), 1979
- Anti-Karagkiozis o Megas (Αντι-Καραγκιόζης ο Μέγας), stage play, 1977
- I Kyria tou Trainou (Η κυρία του τραίνου), stage play, 1980
- O Pater Synesios (Ο Πάτερ Συνέσιος), stage play, 1980
