= Boion =

Boion may refer to:

- Boium, a town of ancient Doris, in Greece
- Bouyon, a town of France
- Voio, a town of Greece
