= Frankish tower of Lilaia =

Medieval tower near Lilaia, Greece

Coordinates: 38°37′33.5″N 22°30′21.2″E

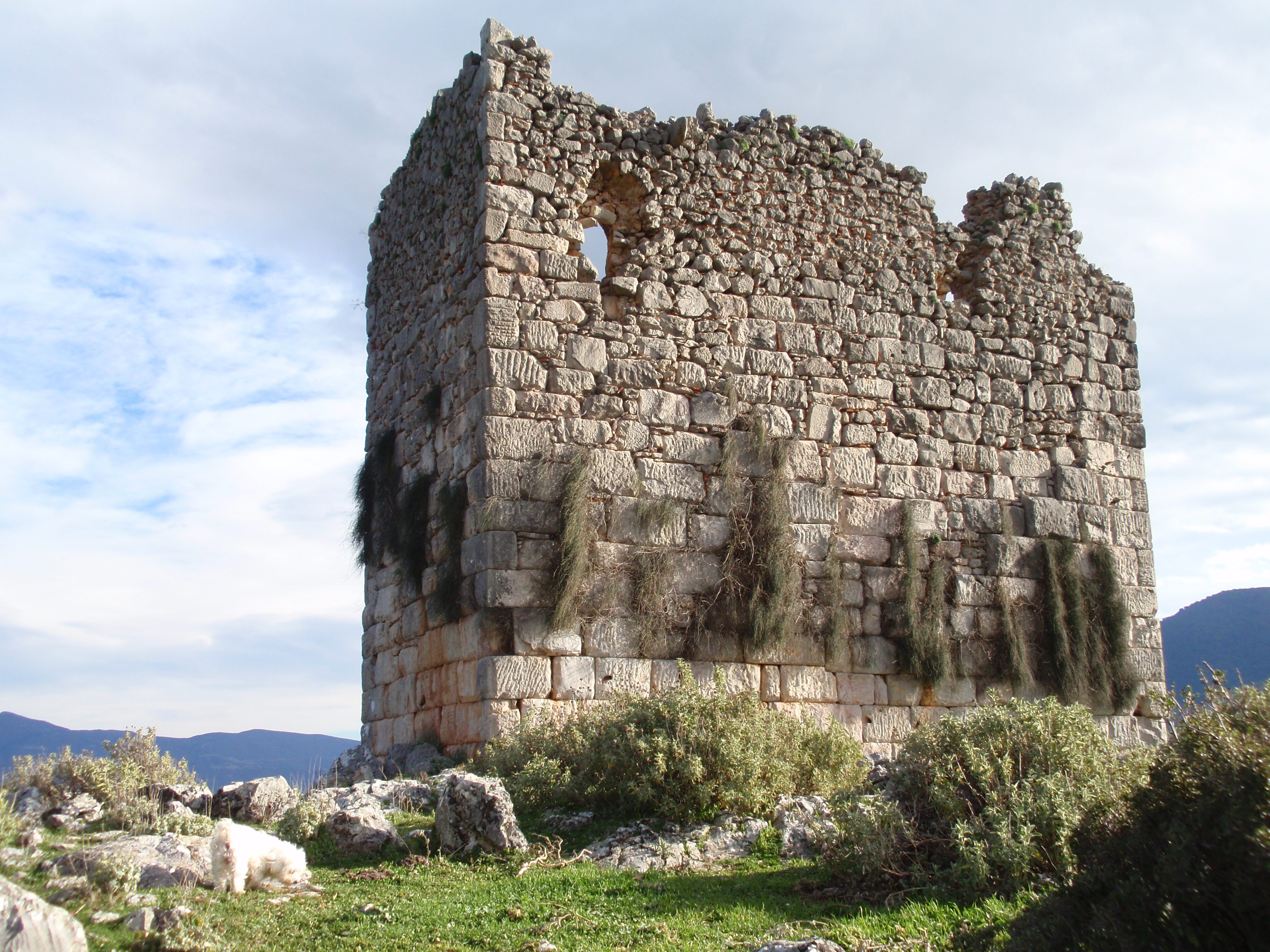
The tower in 2013

The Frankish tower of Lilaia is a late medieval tower near Lilaia, in Phocis, central Greece.

Lilaia lies on the northern slopes of Mount Parnassus and close to the springs of the Boeotic Cephissus. The tower lies about 1 kilometre (0.62 mi) southeast of the modern settlement, at the site of the acropolis of ancient Lilaea. The tower is built on top of the well-preserved Classical-era city wall, and its lower part is built entirely of reused spolia, whereas the upper parts are built with quarried stone and brick.

The tower measures 13.3 metres (44 ft) by 7.6 metres (25 ft), with walls about 1.65 metres (5.4 ft) thick, and survives to a height of approximately 10 metres (33 ft). Its entrance was above-ground at the level of the first floor, on the western wall. Its exception size makes it very likely that it was the centre of an estate or fief.

== Sources ==
- Koder, Johannes; Hild, Friedrich (1976). Tabula Imperii Byzantini, Band 1: Hellas und Thessalia (in German). Vienna: Verlag der Österreichischen Akademie der Wissenschaften. ISBN 978-3-7001-0182-6.
- Lock, Peter (1986). "The Frankish Towers of Central Greece". The Annual of the British School at Athens. 81: 101–123. doi:10.1017/S0068245400020104. S2CID 129263771.
