= Tower of Amfikleia =

Coordinates: 38°38′32.4″N 22°34′53″E

The Tower of Amfikleia is a late medieval tower at Amfikleia, in Phthiotis, central Greece.

Amfikleia (formerly Dadi), occupies a strategic location on the northern slopes of Mount Parnassus and south of the Boeotic Cephissus. The tower is located on the site of the acropolis of ancient Amphicleia, which today is occupied by the cemetery of the modern settlement.

The tower measures 8.5 metres (28 ft) by 10.5 metres (34 ft), making extensive use of spolia ashlar blocks from the acropolis for the first six courses of masonry at its base (corresponding to the ground floor) and then as quoins. In total, the tower survives to a height of about 8 metres (26 ft). The walls are 1.8 metres (5.9 ft) thick at its base, and thin about 20 centimetres (7.9 in) at each of the two surviving above-ground floors. The first floor is supported by ledges offset from the north and south walls, extending from the ground to about 2.5 metres (8.2 ft) in height.

The entrance was 3 metres (9.8 ft) above ground, at the level of the first floor, on the southern face of the tower near its eastern corner. The doorway, which survives in part, preserves sockets for a closing bar. The other faces of the tower feature slit windows.

== Sources ==
- Bon, Antoine (1937). "Forteresses médiévales de la Grèce centrale". Bulletin de correspondance hellénique (in French). 61: 136–208. doi:10.3406/bch.1937.2728.
- Koder, Johannes; Hild, Friedrich (1976). Tabula Imperii Byzantini, Band 1: Hellas und Thessalia (in German). Vienna: Verlag der Österreichischen Akademie der Wissenschaften. ISBN 978-3-7001-0182-6.
- Lock, Peter (1986). "The Frankish Towers of Central Greece". The Annual of the British School at Athens. 81: 101–123. doi:10.1017/S0068245400020104. S2CID 129263771.
