= 213 Lilaea =

Main-belt asteroid

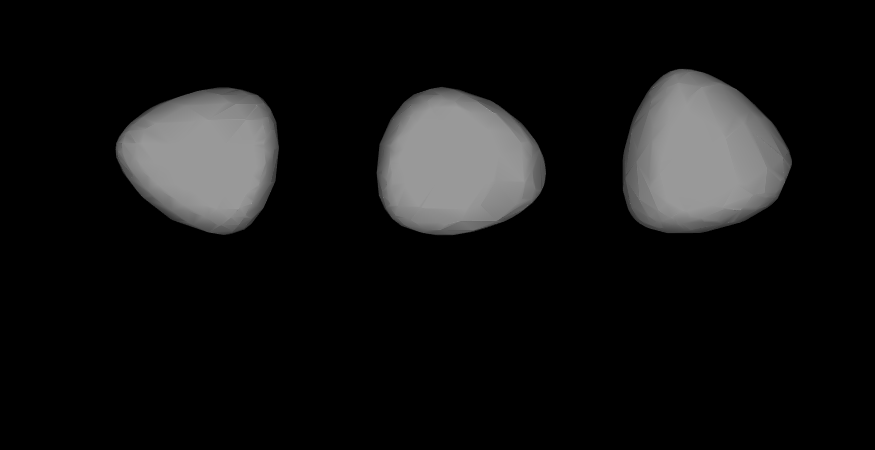
- Lightcurve-based 3D model of 213 Lilaea

Discovery
- Discovered by: C. H. F. Peters
- Discovery date: 16 February 1880

Designations
- Pronunciation: /laɪˈliːə/
- Named after: Lilaea
- Alternative designations: A880 DA, 1950 TE_{3}
- Minor planet category: Main belt

Orbital characteristics
- Epoch 31 July 2016 (JD 2457600.5)
- Uncertainty parameter 0
- Observation arc: 136.08 yr (49704 d)
- Aphelion: 3.1538 AU (471.80 Gm)
- Perihelion: 2.34961 AU (351.497 Gm)
- Semi-major axis: 2.75172 AU (411.651 Gm)
- Eccentricity: 0.14613
- Orbital period (sidereal): 4.56 yr (1667.3 d)
- Average orbital speed: 17.95 km/s
- Mean anomaly: 199.50°
- Mean motion: 0° 12^{m} 57.312^{s} / day
- Inclination: 6.8028°
- Longitude of ascending node: 122.113°
- Argument of perihelion: 162.34°

Physical characteristics
- Dimensions: 83.01±2.6 km
- Mass: (6.0±6.0)×10^{17} kg (Note: Calculated from its standard gravitational parameter GM = 0.04±0.04 km^{3}/s^{2}.) (SB441)
- Mean density: 2.0±2.0 g/cm^{3} (calculated)
- Synodic rotation period: 8.045 h (0.3352 d)
- Geometric albedo: 0.0897±0.006
- Spectral type: F
- Absolute magnitude (H): 8.64

213 Lilaea is a large main belt asteroid. It was discovered by German-American astronomer C. H. F. Peters on February 16, 1880, in Clinton, New York and was named after Lilaea, a Naiad in Greek mythology.

Photometric observations of this asteroid in 1986 gave a light curve with a period of 8.045 ± 0.008 hours and a brightness variation of 0.20 ± 0.01 in magnitude. The curve is asymmetrical with two distinct minima. This object has a spectrum that matches an F-type asteroid classification. As with C-type asteroids, its composition is primitive and rich in carbon.
