= Lilaea =

Water deity, daughter of Cephisos

In Greek mythology, Lilaea or Lilaia (Ancient Greek: Λίλαια, romanized: Lílaia, lit. 'longed for') may refer to two different women:

- Lilaea, a naiad of a spring of the same name. She was the daughter of the river god Cephissus. The ancient polis of Lilaea, and the modern village of Lilaia in Phocis, and the asteroid 213 Lilaea are named after her.
- Lilaia, a maenad named in a vase painting.
