= Hypnia =

Coordinates: 38°28′19″N 22°22′26″E

Hypnia (Ancient Greek: Ὑπνία) was a town in Ozolian Locris. Thucydides writes that the during the Peloponnesian War, Hypnia was among the towns of the Ozolian Locris that were forced to provide hostages to the Spartan army under Eurylochus in 426 BCE.

An inscription survives, dated to the year 190 BCE records an agreement of sympoliteia between Hypnia and Myonia, whose clauses mention the establishment of common administrative elements between both cities that would form a small confederation but both would retain their own magistrates and would maintain their own identity.

Its site is tentatively located near modern Kolopetinitsa.
