= Pindus (city) =

Ancient city of Doris, Greece

Coordinates: 38°40′53″N 22°22′38″E

Pindos or Pindus (Greek: Πίνδος), also called Acyphas or Akyphas (Ἀκύφας), was an ancient city and polis (city-state) of Greece, one of the towns of the tetrapolis of Doris, situated upon a river of the same name, which flows into the Cephissus near Lilaea. Strabo, Theopompus, and Stephanus of Byzantium call the city Akyphas. In one passage Strabo says that Pindus lay above Erineus, and in another he places it in the district of Oetaea; it is, therefore, probable that the town stood in the upper part of the valley, near the sources of the river in the mountain.

The ancient city was situated at a site called Ano Kastelli or Pyrgos, approximately 2.1 miles (3.4 km) southwest of Kastellia, and approximately 2.8 miles (4.5 km) northwest of Gravia.
