= Apostolias =

Apostolias Αποστολιάς
- Community
- Location within Greece
- Coordinates: 38°43′N 22°24′E
- Country: Greece
- Administrative region: Central Greece
- Regional unit: Phocis
- Municipality: Delphi
- Municipal unit: Gravia

Population (2021)
  - Community: 59
- Time zone: UTC+2 (EET)
  - Summer (DST): UTC+3 (EEST)
- Vehicle registration: ΑΜ

Apostolias (Greek: Αποστολιάς, before 1927: Κάτω Κάνιανη - Kato Kaniani) is a village in the municipal unit of Gravia, in the northeastern part of Phocis, Greece. Apostolias is situated at the foot of Mount Oeta at 520 m above sea level. Until World War II, many of its residents worked in the bauxite mine on the east side of the Agios Vasileios mountain. The mine was destroyed by the occupying Italian forces.

== Population ==
Year	Population
1981	244
1991	204
2001	83
2011	53
2021	59

== See also ==
- List of settlements in Phocis
