= Tithronium =

Ancient frontier town of Phocis and Doris

Coordinates: 38°40′31″N 22°34′52″E

Tithronium or Tithronion (Ancient Greek: Τιθρώνιον), or Tethronium or Tethronion (Τεθρώνιον), was a frontier town of ancient Phocis, on the side of Doris. Livy, who calls it Tritonon, describes it as a town of Doris, but all other ancient writers place it in Phocis. During the Greco-Persian Wars, it was destroyed by the army of Xerxes I together with the other Phocian towns in 480 BCE. It is placed by Pausanias in the plain at the distance of 15 stadia from Amphicleia.

Its site has been located at a place called Palaiokastro (old castle).
