= Amphicleia =

Town in ancient Greece

Coordinates: 38°38′33″N 22°34′53″E

Amphicleia or Amphikleia (Ancient Greek: Ἀμφίκλεια) or Amphicaea or Amphikaia (Ἀμφίκαια) was a Greek town in the north of ancient Phocis, distant 60 stadia from Lilaea, and 15 stadia from Tithronium. It was destroyed by the Persian army of Xerxes in his invasion of Greece (480 BCE). Although Herodotus calls it Amphicaea, following the most ancient traditions, the Amphictyonic League gave it the name of Amphicleia in their decree respecting rebuilding the town (346 BCE). It also bore for some time the name of Ophiteia (Ὀφιτεία), in consequence of a legend, which Pausanias relates. The place was celebrated in the time of Pausanias for the worship of Dionysus, to which an inscription refers, found at the site of the ancient town.

The site of the ancient town is occupied by the cemetery of the modern town of Amfikleia. It is also the site of a medieval tower (Paliopyrgos), which has been built with extensive reuse of spolia from the acropolis of Amphicleia.
