= Oinochori =

Oinochori Οινοχώρι
- Community
- Location within Greece
- Coordinates: 38°42′11″N 22°21′25″E
- Country: Greece
- Administrative region: Central Greece
- Regional unit: Phocis
- Municipality: Delphi
- Municipal unit: Gravia

Population (2021)
  - Community: 35
- Time zone: UTC+2 (EET)
  - Summer (DST): UTC+3 (EEST)

Oinochori (Greek: Οινοχώρι, meaning "village of wine", before 1927: Άνω Κάνιανη - Ano Kaniani) is a small village (2021 population: 35) in the municipal unit of Gravia, Phocis, Greece. It is located at an altitude of approximately 900 meters on the slope of Mount Oiti. Ruins just outside the village are thought to be from the Dorian or pre-Dorian city of Dryopis.
