= Gravia =

Village in Phocis, Greece

Gravia Γραβιά
- Municipal unit
- Location within the regional unit

- Location within Greece
- Coordinates: 38°40′N 22°25′E
- Country: Greece
- Administrative region: Central Greece
- Regional unit: Phocis
- Municipality: Delphi

Area
  - Municipal unit: 161.651 km^{2} (62.414 sq mi)
- Highest elevation: 1,700 m (5,600 ft)
- Lowest elevation: 400 m (1,300 ft)

Population (2021)
  - Municipal unit: 1,811
  - Municipal unit density: 11.20/km^{2} (29.02/sq mi)
  - Community: 520
- Time zone: UTC+2 (EET)
  - Summer (DST): UTC+3 (EEST)
- Postal code: 330 57
- Area code: 26940
- Vehicle registration: AM
- Website: www.gravia.gov.gr

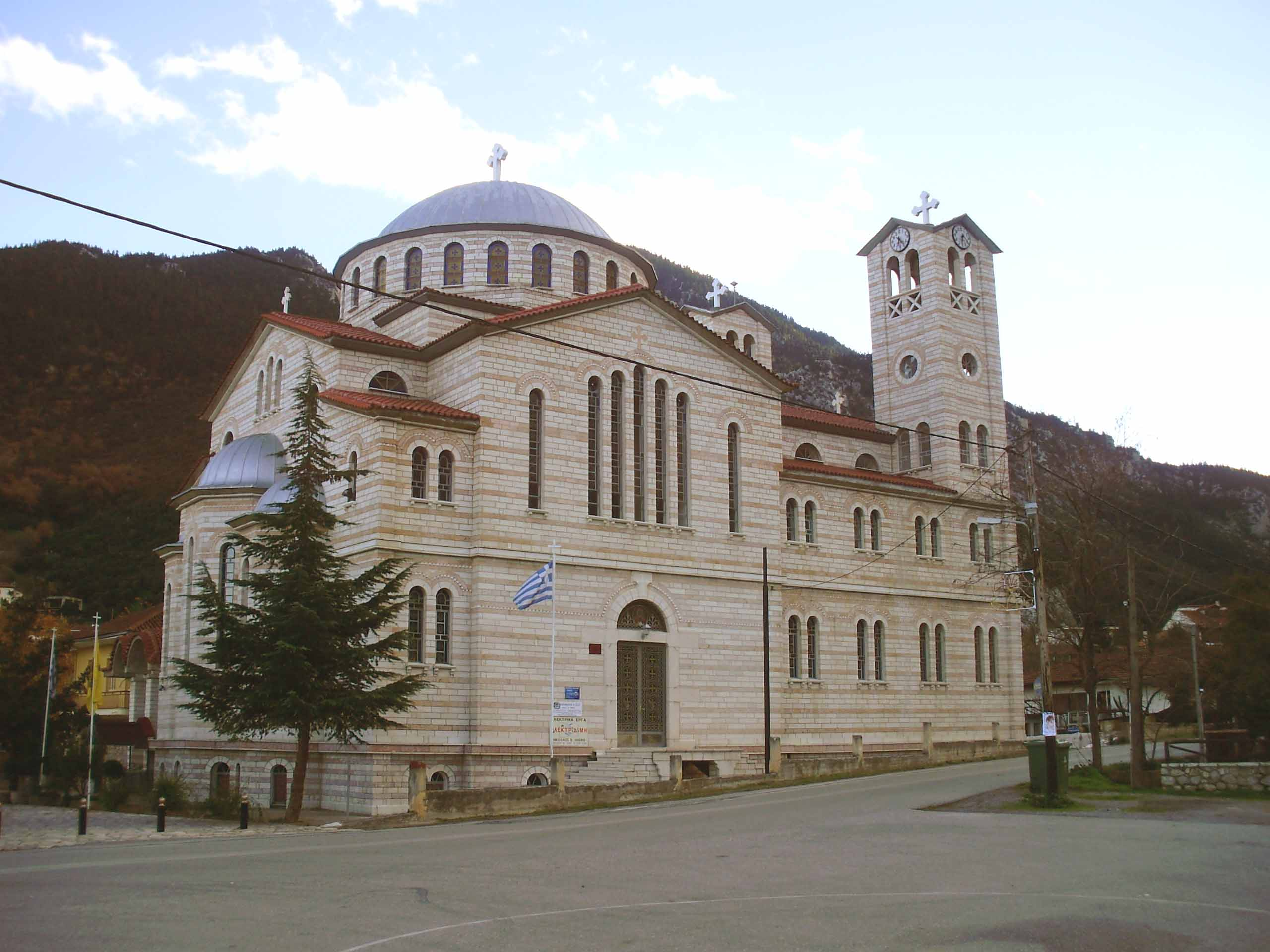
Central church

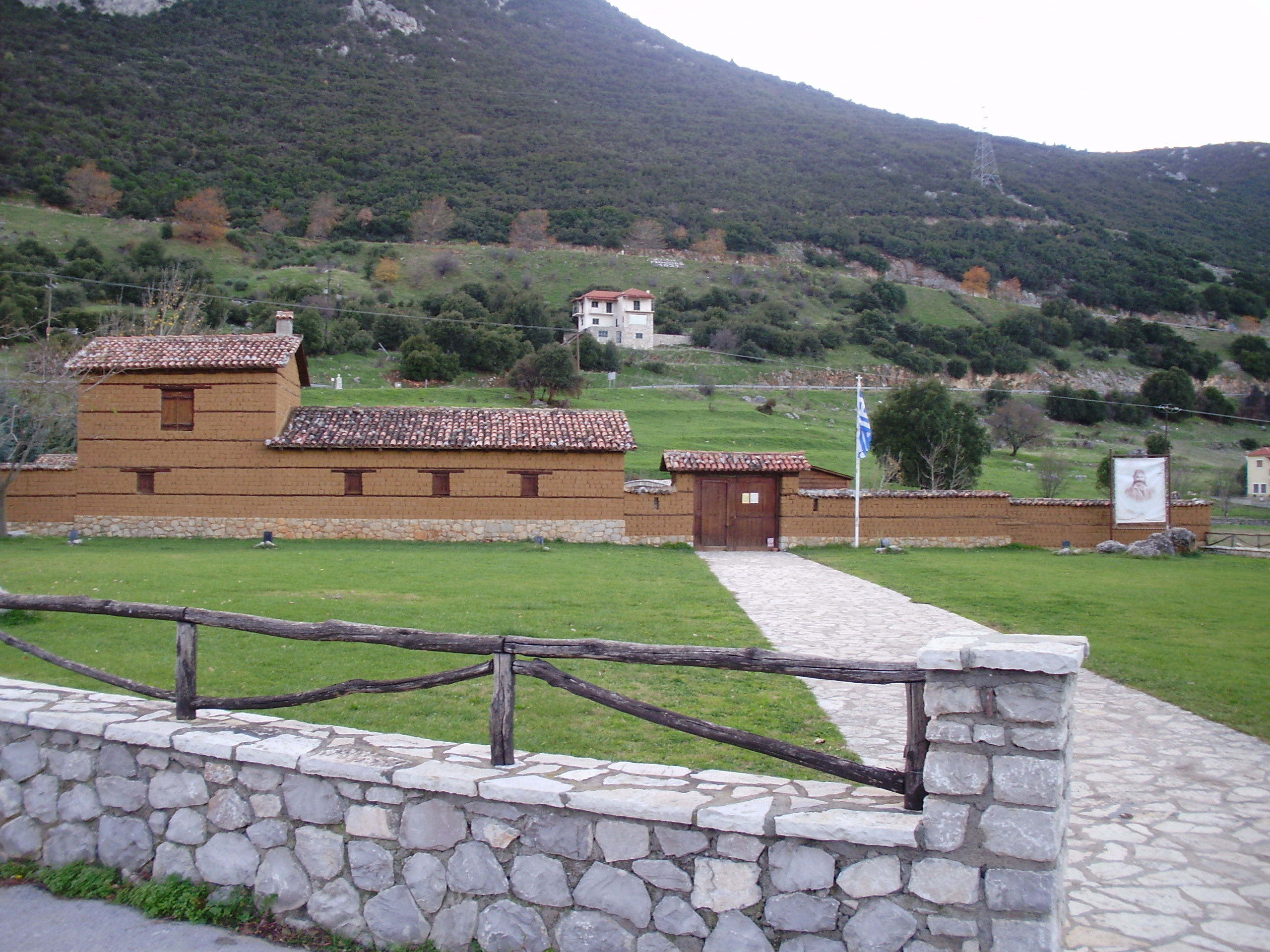
Gravia Inn

Gravia (Greek: Γραβιά) is a village and a former municipality in the northeastern part of Phocis, Greece. Since the 2011 local government reform it is part of the municipality Delphi, of which it is a municipal unit. The municipal unit has an area of 161.651 km^{2}.

== Location ==
The municipal unit Gravia is situated in the foothills of the mountains Giona and Parnassus. The northeastern part of the municipal unit covers the western end of the wide valley of the river Cephissus. There are farmlands in the valley. The municipal unit borders Phthiotis Prefecture to the north and northeast. The Greek National Road 27 connects Gravia with Itea, Amfissa and Lamia. Gravia is located south of Lamia, northwest of Livadia and north of Amfissa and Itea.

== History ==
The name is of Slavic origin, pointing to a settlement of the area after the 6th century; initially it was the name of a local river (mod. Koukouvistianos), which was later transferred to a castle some 5 km northwest of the modern settlement, above the acropolis of the ancient settlement of Pindus. The castle was most likely built by the Crusaders in the early 13th century, being mentioned for the first time in 1259, when the Prince of Achaea William II of Villehardouin crossed the local pass on his way to the Battle of Pelagonia. In 1275 it was one of the castles ceded by the ruler of Thessaly, John I Doukas, to the Duchy of Athens, as the dowry of his daughter Helena Angelina Komnene. The castle's history is unknown thereafter, except for a brief mention in 1304.

Gravia is famous for the battle of the Gravia Inn, that took place during the Greek Revolution of 1821. Odysseas Androutsos along with a group of Greek soldiers successfully repelled an attack from the Turkish army led by Omer Vryonis in May 1821.

== Municipal districts ==
- Apostolias
- Gravia
- Kaloskopi
- Kastellia
- Mariolata
- Oinochori
- Sklithro
- Vargiani

== Population ==
Year	Town population	Municipal unit population
1981	918	-
1991	887	-
2001	897	2,975
2011	604	2,073
2021	520	1,811

== Sporting clubs ==
- Androutsos Gravia

== See also ==
- List of settlements in Boeotia

== Sources ==
- Koder, Johannes; Hild, Friedrich (1976). Tabula Imperii Byzantini, Band 1: Hellas und Thessalia (in German). Vienna: Verlag der Österreichischen Akademie der Wissenschaften. ISBN 3-7001-0182-1.
