= Lilaia (village) =

Lilaia Λιλαία
- Community
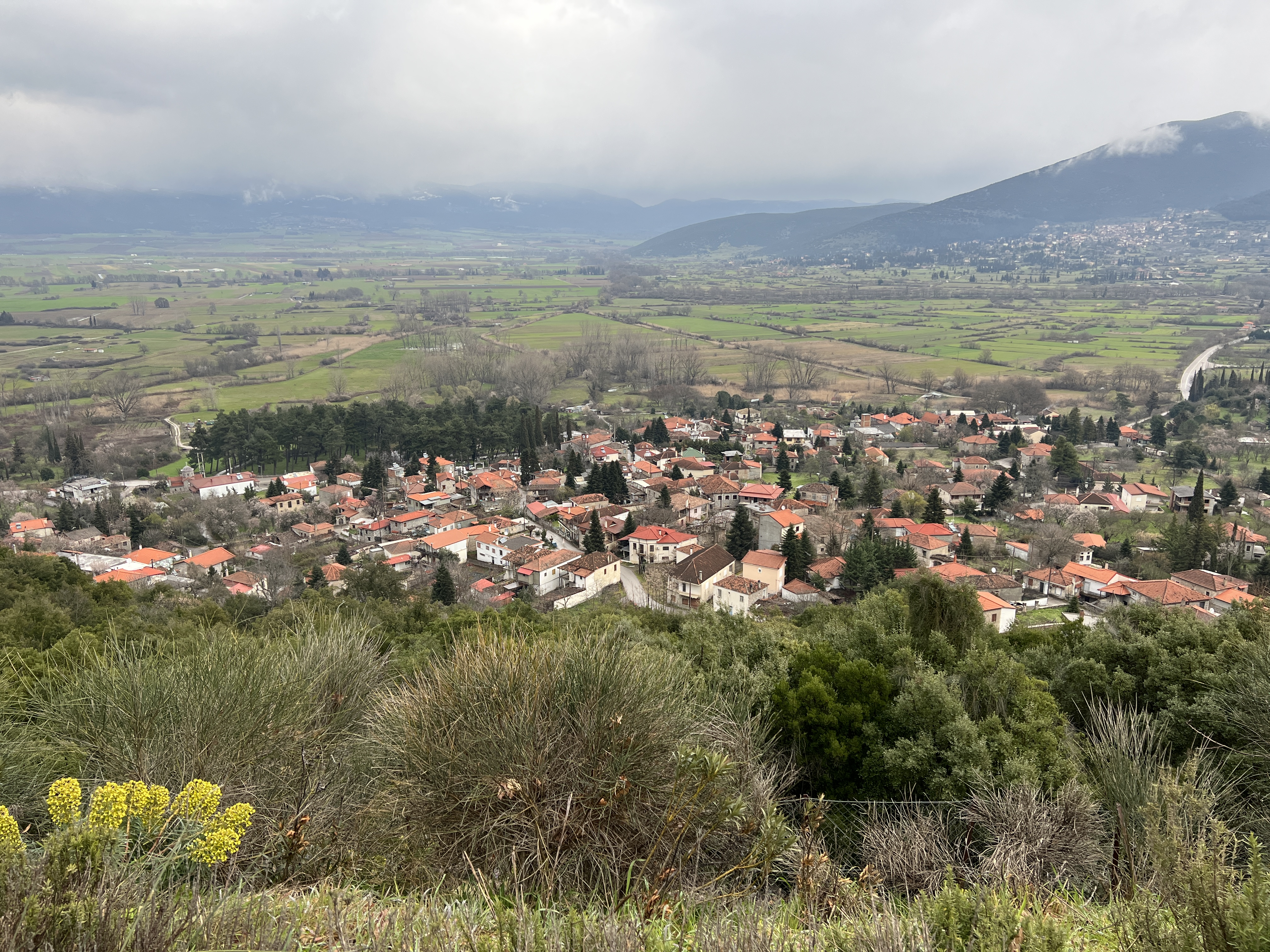

- Location within Greece
- Coordinates: 38°38′1″N 22°29′46″E
- Country: Greece
- Administrative region: Central Greece
- Regional unit: Phocis
- Municipality: Delphi
- Municipal unit: Parnassos

Population (2021)
  - Community: 195
- Time zone: UTC+2 (EET)
  - Summer (DST): UTC+3 (EEST)
- Vehicle registration: ΜΙ

Lilaia (Greek: Λιλαία) is a village in the Phocis regional unit, in Central Greece. Until 1920 it was known as Kato Agoriani (Κάτω Αγόριανη), but was renamed after the nearby ancient city of Lilaea in 1920.

== Transport ==
The Greek National Road 3 (Livadeia - Lamia) passes north of the village.

The village is served by Lilaia railway station, with regional services between Athens and Leianokladi. The station sees around 2 trains per-day.

== See also ==
- Lilaea (ancient city)
- Frankish tower of Lilaia
