= Cytinium =

Coordinates: 38°42′50″N 22°29′19″E

Cytinium or Kytinion (Greek: Κυτίνιον or Κυτείνιον) was an ancient city and polis (city-state) of Greece, one of the towns of the tetrapolis of Doris. Its site is within the bounds of the modern village of Palaiochori.

Cytinium was more frequently mentioned in history than the other towns of the Tetrapolis owing to its situation, which rendered it a place of great military importance. The position of the town, commanding the northern entrance of the pass leading from the valley of Doris to the plain of Amphissa, illustrates the intended expedition of Demosthenes from Naupactus in 426 BCE. This commander proposed, if he had been successful over the Aetolians, to have marched through the Locri Ozolae, leaving Parnassus on the right, to Cytinium in Doris, and from thence to have descended into Phocis, whose inhabitants were to have joined him in invading Boeotia. When Eurylochus, the Spartan general, shortly after the failure of the expedition of Demosthenes, was about to march from Delphi against Naupactus, he deposited at Cytinium the hostages he had received from the Locrians. Philip II of Macedon seized it in the course of his invasion of Greece in 339 BCE.

The site of Cytinium (Kytinion) lies at a site called Agios Georgios within the bounds of modern day Palaiochori.

== See also ==
STOA Pleiades link
