= Mount Giona =

Mountain in Phocis, Central Greece

Giona
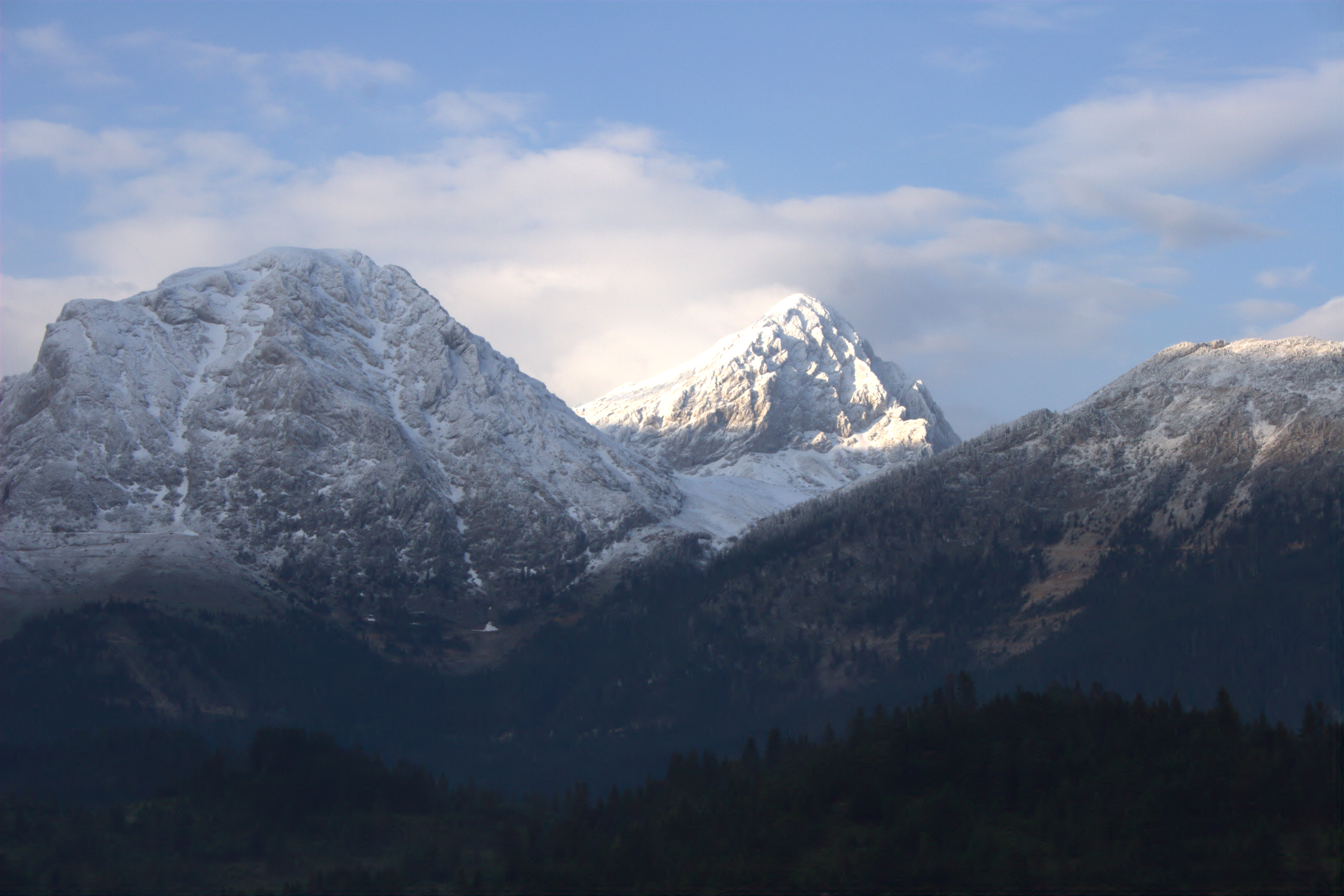
- The mountain of Giona as seen from Panourgia, the north face of the mountain

Highest point
- Elevation: 2,510 m (8,230 ft)
- Prominence: 1,702 m (5,584 ft)
- Listing: Ultra
- Coordinates: 38°38′51″N 22°15′16″E

Naming
- Pronunciation: Greek: [ˈɟona]

Geography
- Location within Greece
- Location: Phocis, Greece

Mount Giona (Greek: Γκιώνα, also transliterated as Gkiona, pronounced [ˈɟona]) is a mountain in Phocis, Central Greece. It is located between the mountains of Parnassus to the east, Vardousia to the west, and Oeta to the north. Known in classical antiquity as the Aselinon Oros (Greek: Ασέληνον όρος, 'moonless mountain'), it is the highest mountain south of Olympus and the fifth overall in Greece. Pyramida is its highest peak at 2,510 metres (8,235 ft). Other peaks include the Perdika (Πέρδικα, 2,484 m), Tragonoros (Τραγονόρος, 2,456 m), Platyvouna or Plativouna (Πλατυβούνα, 2,316 m), Profitis Ilias (Προφήτης Ηλίας, 2,298 m), Kastro (Κάστρο, 2,176 m), Vraila (Βράϊλα, 2,177 m), Paliovouni (Παλιοβούνι, 2,122 m), Pyrgos (Πύργος, 2,066 m), Lyritsa (Λυρίτσα, 2,007 m), Botsikas (Μπότσικας, 1,945 m), Kokkinari (Κοκκινάρι, 1,908 m), Tychioni (Τυχιούνι, 1,842) and another Profitis Ilias (Προφήτης Ηλίας, 1,806 m). It is drained by the river Mornos to the west.

The nearest town is Amphissa, to the southeast. Smaller villages in the mountains are Kaloskopi in the northeast, Stromi in the north, Lefkaditi in the west and Agia Efthymia in the southeast.
