= Lilaea (ancient city) =

Ancient Phocian town and polis (city-state)

Coordinates: 38°37′37″N 22°30′21″E

Lilaea or Lilaia (Ancient Greek: Λίλαια), also Lilaeum or Lilaion (Λίλαιον), was one of the most important ancient Phocian towns, and a polis (city-state), built on the north slopes of Mount Parnassus, and at the sources of the Cephissus.

== Description ==
The name Lilaea appears for the first time in Homer's Iliad (in the Catalogue of Ships) as one of the nine Phocian towns which had participated at the Trojan War. Lilaea was named after the Naiad Lilaea, the daughter of the river-god Cephissus, since the city itself was situated close to the sources of the river. A sanctuary dedicated to Artemis and another one, dedicated to the deified river stood there in antiquity. The inhabitants of Lilaea believed that the water of Castalian spring in Delphi was a gift of Cephissus, so some days in the year they threw sweets in the river, thinking that they would surface in Castalia.

== History ==
The broader region of Lilaea had been inhabited since the 3rd millennium BCE. Herodotus does not mention it among the Phocian cities which had been destroyed by the Persians, possibly because in those days it was attached to Doris, which made its submission to Xerxes I, or because it was so well fortified that the Persians never subdued it. Based upon numismatic and epigraphic evidence, the latter appears the more likely. The city is also mentioned by Strabo, Pausanias, Ptolemy, Pliny the Elder, and Stephanus of Byzantium. Lilaea was destroyed during the Third Sacred War by Philip II of Macedon in 346 BCE, but it was rebuilt during the following years in the course of the project for the reconstruction of the Phocian citadels. It was besieged by Philip V of Macedon and the city had to accept that a Macedonian garrison but soon after an uprising, led by Patron, managed to defeat the Macedonians and they withdrew after the formalization of a pact.

== Description ==
When Pausanias visited Lilaea, in the second century, he reported seeing a theatre, an agora, and baths, with temples of Apollo and Artemis, containing statues of Athenian workmanship and of Pentelic marble.

== Archaeology ==
Lilaea is located near the modern namesake village of Lilaia. Its walls and gates are to the east of the modern settlement.

Among the visible antiquities of the region count the architectural members by the springs of Agia Eleoussa, where a fountain and the temple of Cephissus lay, as well as the early Byzantine remains of a basilica dedicated to St. Christopher. Another Byzantine church, dated to the 10th-11th century was dedicated to St. Eleoussa. The fortification of the city is evident on the hill "Pyrgos" or "Palaeokastro". During the Frankish period the site was fortified with a new wall.
