= Amfissa =

Town in Phocis, Greece

Amphissa Άμφισσα
- Municipal unit
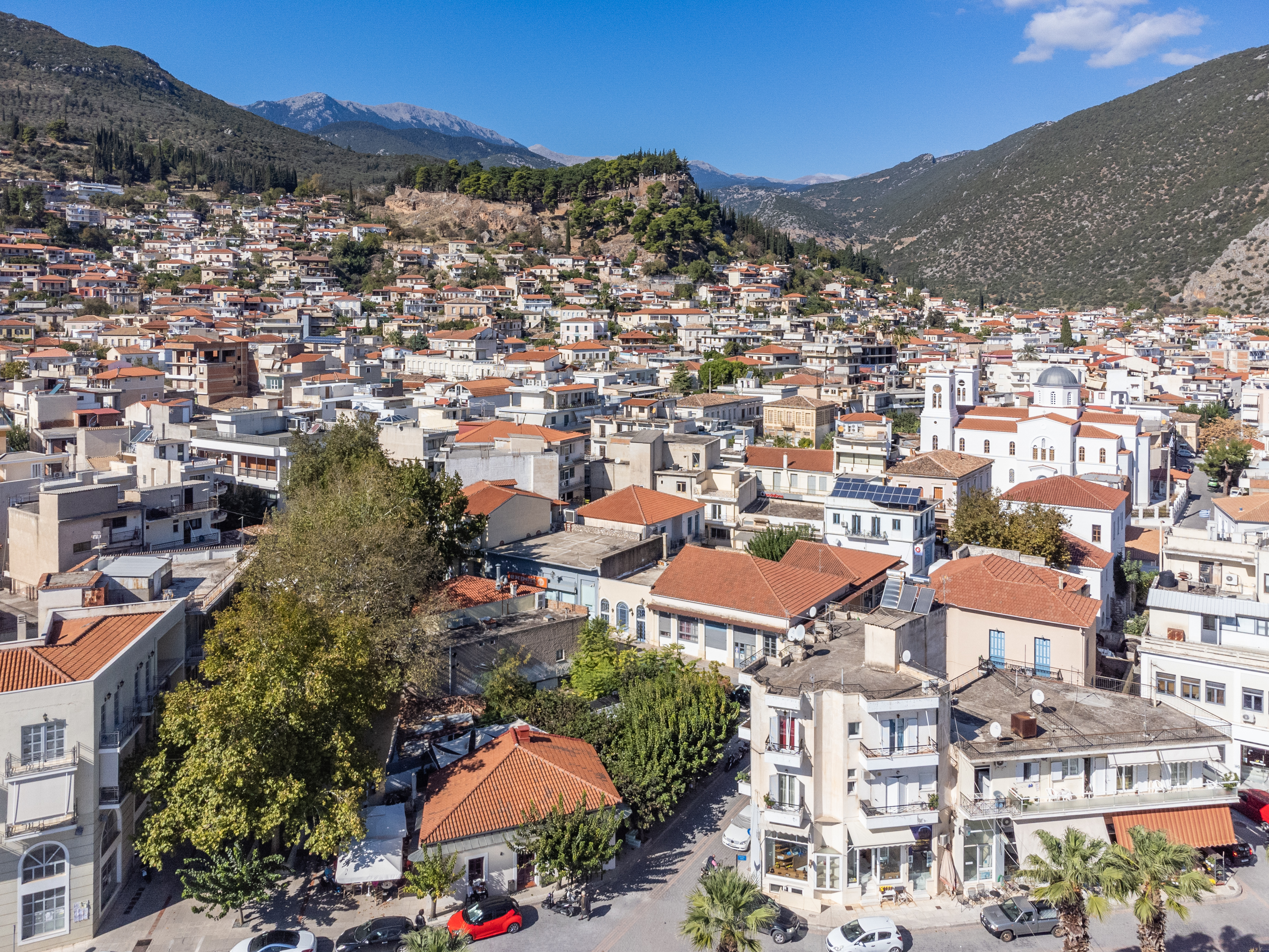
- View of Amphissa

- Location within the regional unit

- Location within Greece
- Coordinates: 38°32′N 22°22′E
- Country: Greece
- Administrative region: Central Greece
- Regional unit: Phocis
- Municipality: Delphi

Area
  - Municipal unit: 315.174 km^{2} (121.689 sq mi)
- Lowest elevation: 180 m (590 ft)

Population (2021)
  - Municipal unit: 7,761
  - Municipal unit density: 24.62/km^{2} (63.78/sq mi)
  - Community: 6,334
- Time zone: UTC+2 (EET)
  - Summer (DST): UTC+3 (EEST)
- Postal code: 331 00
- Area code: 22650
- Vehicle registration: AM

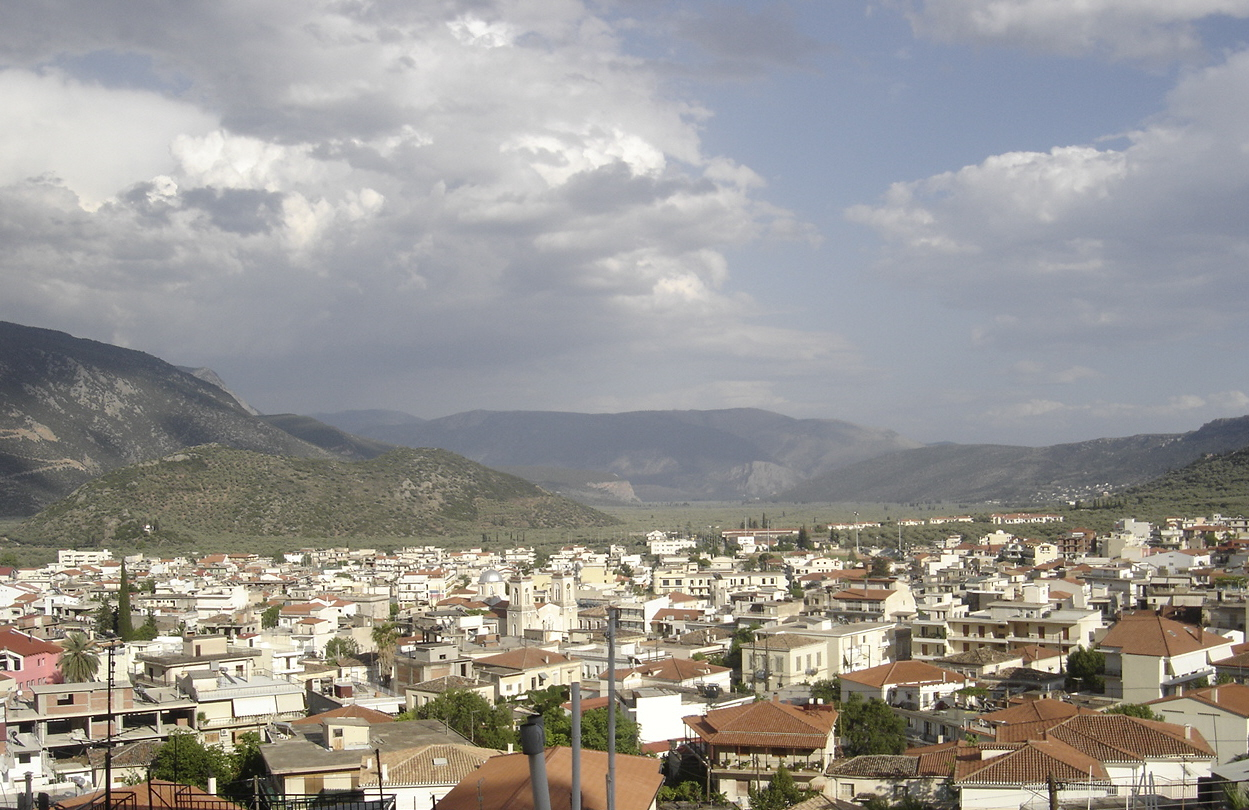
Southern part of Amphissa

Amphissa (Greek: Άμφισσα [ˈamfisa]) is a town in Phocis, Greece, part of the municipality of Delphi, of which it is the seat and a municipal unit. The municipal unit has an area of 315.174 km^{2}. It lies on the northern edge of the olive forest of the Crissaean plain, between two mountains, Giona to the west and Parnassus to the east, 200 km (120 mi) northwest of Athens and 20 km (12 mi) of Delphi, as well as 85 km (53 mi) northeast of Naupactus and 72 km (45 mi) south of Lamia.

Amphissa dates back to antiquity, with its history spanning around 3,000 years, and has been traditionally the largest and capital city of Phocis. It was the most important city of the ancient Greek tribe of the Ozolian Locrians and one of the most powerful cities in Central Greece. In the Middle Ages, Amphissa came to be known as Salona. It declined after several foreign conquests and destructions, but emerged as an important city in the region and played a major role during the Greek War of Independence.

== Origin of the name ==
It is believed that the name Άμφισσα (Amphissa) derives from the ancient Greek verb αμφιέννυμι (amfiennymi), meaning 'surround', since the city is surrounded by mountains Giona and Parnassus.

According to the Greek mythology, Amphissa, the daughter of Macar, son of Aeolus, and mistress of the god Apollo, gave her name to the city.

During the Frankish occupation of Greece in the 13th century, Amphissa was captured by the king of Thessalonica, Boniface of Montferrat, and was renamed to La Sole; since then the city came to be called Salona in Greek. In 1833, after the establishment of the independent Greek State, the ancient name Amphissa was given back to the city.

== History ==
=== Classical era ===
Amphissa has been settled since the ancient times and was the chief town of Ozolian Locris, a region inhabited by the ancient Greek tribe of Locrians; the largest and most renowned town of Locris, beautifully constructed and located one hundred and twenty stades away from Delphi.

Pausanias, in his work Description of Greece, mentions the existence of the tombs of Amfissa and Andraemon, and the temple of Athena on the acropolis of the town, with a standing statue of bronze, which was said to have been brought from Troy by Thoas. The Amphissians celebrated mysteries in honor of the "anaktes boys", who might be the Dioskouroi, the Curetes or the Cabeiri (10.38). In Amphissa there were also the tomb of Gorge, wife of Andraemon, and a temple of Asclepius.

Recent excavations have revealed a Mycenaean tomb in Amphissa, preliminary findings indicate that the tomb was in use for more than two centuries, from the 13th to the 11th century B.C.

Findings of several excavations revealed that the town had developed its commerce with Corinth and towns of the northwestern Peloponnese at the end of the 8th century BC. Amphissa was organised as polis in the 7th century BC and flourished in arts and trade, which lasted for three centuries. Parts of the walls of the ancient acropolis of the town date back between the 7th and the 6th century BC. In 653 BC, people from Amphissa migrated to Southern Italy and founded the town of Epizephyrian Locri. Amphissa's calendar differed from that of the other Ozolian towns, while four of the months' names known are Argestyon, Panigyrion, Amon and Pokios. Its coins had the head of Apollo on the one side, and the inscription "ΑΜΦΙΣΣΕΩΝ" (Amphissians'), a spear-head and a jaw-bone of Calydonian boar, and either a star or grapes on the other.

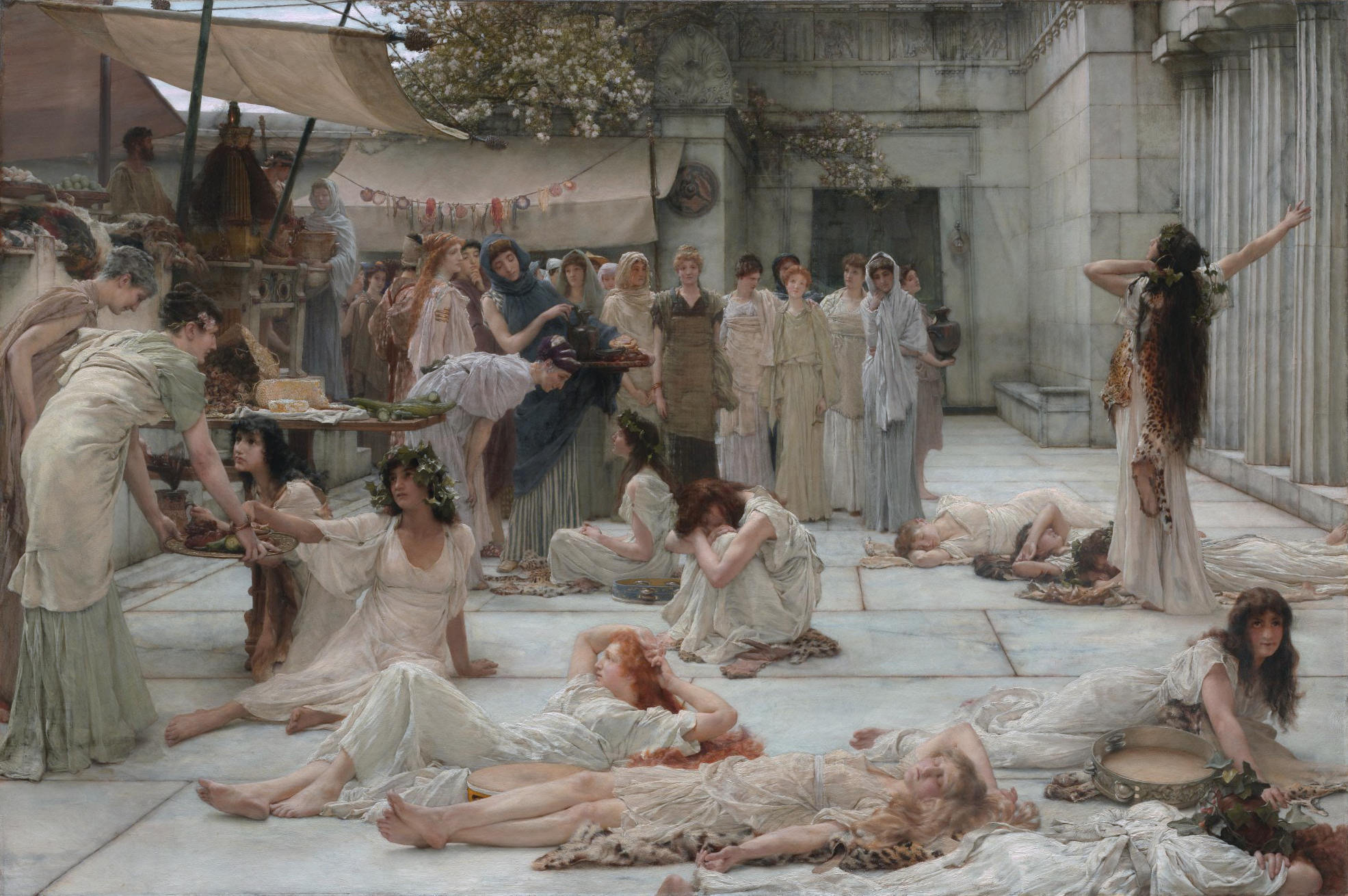
Women of Amphissa, by Lawrence Alma-Tadema and Laura Theresa Alma-Tadema (1887).

Following the Greek defeat by the Persians in the battle of Thermopylae, Persian troops invaded Phocis, Ozolian Locris, Doris and Boeotia. It is then that Amphissa, due to its strong acropolis, received Phocians seeking for safety. During the Peloponnesian War, Amphissa fought on Sparta's side, drifting the other towns of Ozolian Locris in this way. The town's form of government was oligarchic, similar to that of Sparta, but, during the Pericles' era in Athens, some unsuccessful attempts to establish democracy took place. Ten of the archontes of Amphissa have been known through inscriptions found at Delphi: Theagenes of Menandros, Voriadas, Charixenus, Aristodamus of Damon, Dorotheus, Euarchus, Archedamus, Aristodamus of Epinicus, Charixenus and Aristarchus.

In 426 BC, Spartan general Eurylochus, on his way to Naupactus, arrived to Delphi and sent a herald to Amphissa, in order to detach them from Athens and make the Amphissians leave him pass through their lands. The latter were the first to give him hostages and also persuaded the other Locrian cities to do the same, as they were alarmed at the hostility of the neighbouring Phocians. After the Peloponnesian War the Amphissians were allies to Thebes. In 395 BC, the Thebans encouraged the Amphissians to collect taxes from territories claimed by both Locris and Phocis; in response, the Phocians invaded Locris, and ransacked Locrian territory and its metropolis, Amphissa.

As a result, the Amphissians and the rest of Locrians, along with the Thebans, attacked Phocis, and the Phocians, in turn, appealed to their ally, Sparta. These conflicts led to the Corinthian War, with the Amphissians on the side of Athens, Argos, Corinth and Thebes.

During the Third Sacred War, 356 – 346 BC, the Amphissians, who were allies of the Thebans, cultivated part of the Crissaean plain, which belonged to Delphi, and founded potteries in Kirra. In 339 BC, the Athenians offered golden shields to the Temple of Apollo in Delphi with inscriptions insulting to the Thebans, who provoked the deputy of Amphissa to oppose to this offer. Then Aeschines, the Athenian deputy, contradicted the Amphissians, introducing their illegal actions in the sacred lands of the Oracle of Delphi before the Amphictyonic League, which called Philip II of Macedon to intercede.

In 338 BC, in what became known as the Fourth Sacred War, Philip attacked and destroyed Amphissa, expelling large parts of its population and giving the area to Delphi, which is known as the Fourth Sacred War. Later in the same year, under the motivation of Demosthenes, a confederation of the Athenians and the Thebans was organized against the Macedonians, which the Amphissians and the rest of the Ozolian Locrians joined.

=== Hellenistic era ===
The Amphissians managed to rebuild their town and give to it its former power, but in 322 BC it was sieged by Alexander of Aetolia. In 279 BC, four hundred Amphissian hoplites joined the Greek forces which defended Delphi against the Gauls. Later, the Amphissians and the Aetolians tightened their old affiliation, and in 250 BC, Amphissa joined the Aetolian League as friend and relative of the Aetolians. In 245 BC, Aratus, the strategos of the Achaean League, attacked and damaged Amphissa, but the Aetolian league allied with the Roman general Titus Quinctius Flamininus against Philip V of Macedon, and after their win over the Macedonian king at the Battle of Cynoscephalae (197 BC), Titus proclaimed Amphissa, among other cities, as an independent and tax-exempt polis, capital of Ozolian Locris, with its own Boule, Ecclesia and coins. But when the Aetolians realised that Rome was to rule the Greek cities and asked Antiochus III the Great of Syria for help, the Roman general Manius Acilius Glabrio seized Lamia and advanced to Amphissa, where he conquered the Crissaean plain and besieged the town in 190 BC.

The Amphissians, being confident for the power of their acropolis and their walls, defended the city, but the fall of Amphissa to the superior forces of the Romans was likely to happen. Then, Manius Acilius was replaced by Lucius Cornelius Scipio Asiaticus, and the people of Amphissa ran into the acropolis. Athenian deputies intervened and prevented Amphissa from the siege, achieving a truce between the two sides.

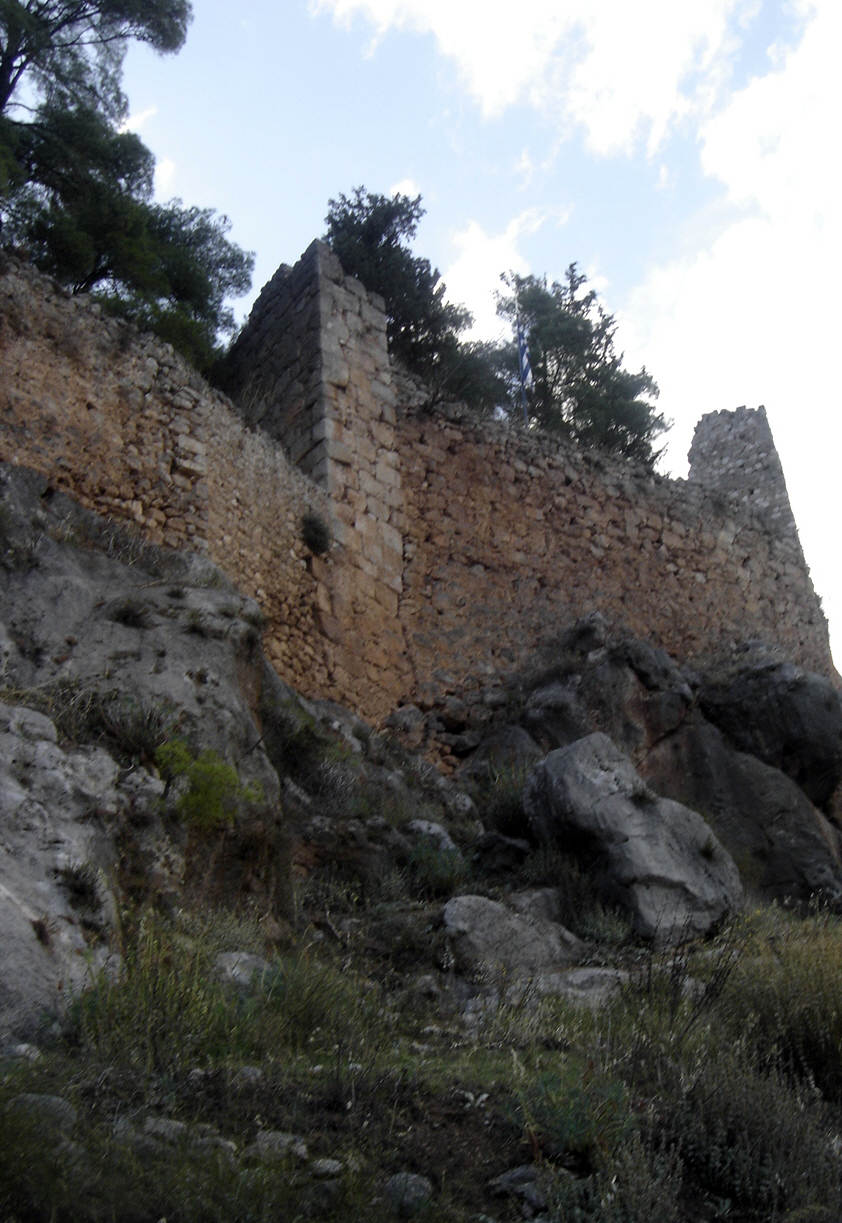
View of the medieval castle ("Orias").

In the period between 174 and 160 BC, Amphissa had been damaged several times during the hostilities which took place between the pro-Roman Aetolians and the nationalists of the town.

=== Roman and Byzantine era ===
When Octavian founded the town of Nicopolis, in memory of his victory over Antony and Cleopatra in the battle of Actium, he drove Aetolians to populate it but the parts of them moved to Amphissa. That is why Pausanias says that the Amphissians were ashamed of calling themselves Ozolians, thus they claimed Aetolian descent, a fact that was a misconception of Pausanias, because some people of Amphissa in his times were indeed descendants of Aetolian refugees. In that period, Plutarch mentions, in the work Parallel Lives, a physician from Amphissa named Philotas (Marcus Antonius 28). During the 2nd century, Amphissa was a prosperous town which expanded outside its walls, having a population of 70,000 people in 180 AD.

In the early Byzantine period, Amphissa was devastated by several foreign peoples who invaded Central Greece, like the Visigoths under Alaric I and the Huns. In 451, the town probably had an episcopical seat and in 530, Justinian I fortified the towns around the Crissaean plain and fixed the fortress of Amphissa. Hierocles in his Synecdemus mentions Amphissa as one of the towns of the Roman province of Achaia, which was under the rule of the vice-consul of Athens. The town later became part of the Theme of Hellas.

Since the middle of the 9th century, new invaders, the Bulgars, raided the region of Phocis and besieged Amphissa several times, but the most damaging assault was in 996, when Samuel of Bulgaria destroyed the town and slaughtered its people. in 1059, Pechenegs besieged Amphissa one more time and forced the Amphissians to hide in caves of the region to avoid a massacre. In 1147 the Normans arrived to the Crissaean plain but left Amphissa unspoilt, maybe due to the town's decline.

=== Crusader era ===
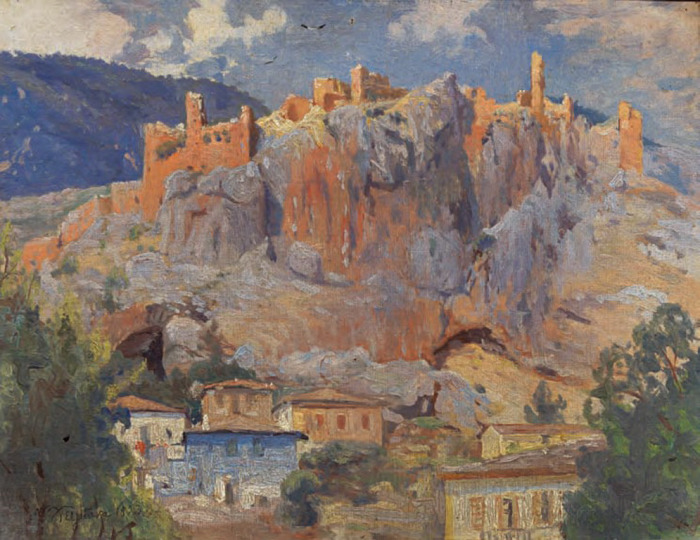
Castle of Amfissa (Salona)

In 1205, after the Fourth Crusade and the establishment of the Latin Empire, Boniface of Montferrat, the king of Thessalonica, conquered the region of Central Greece. Amphissa became the seat of the Lordship of Salona under Thomas I d'Autremencourt. It is then that the new governors built the powerful Castle of Salona on the hill where the ancient acropolis of Amphissa existed, while the ancient name of the town was replaced by the new name Salona, or La Sole in French and La Sola in Italian. In 1311, the Catalans conquered and ruled Central Greece for more than eighty years.

=== Ottoman era and the Greek War of Independence ===
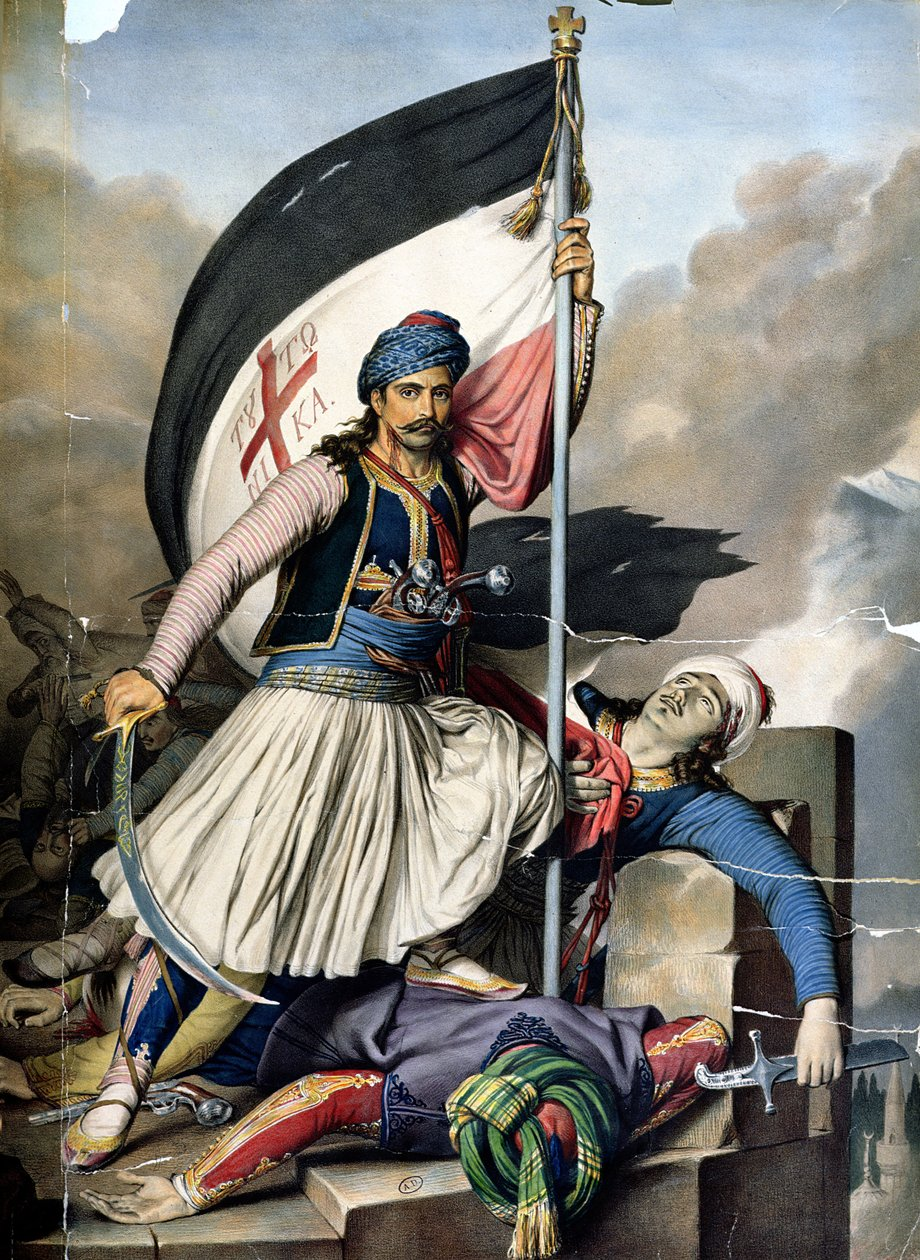
Nikos Mitropoulos hoists the flag at Salona. Painting of the capture of the city by the Greeks in 1821, by Louis Dupré.

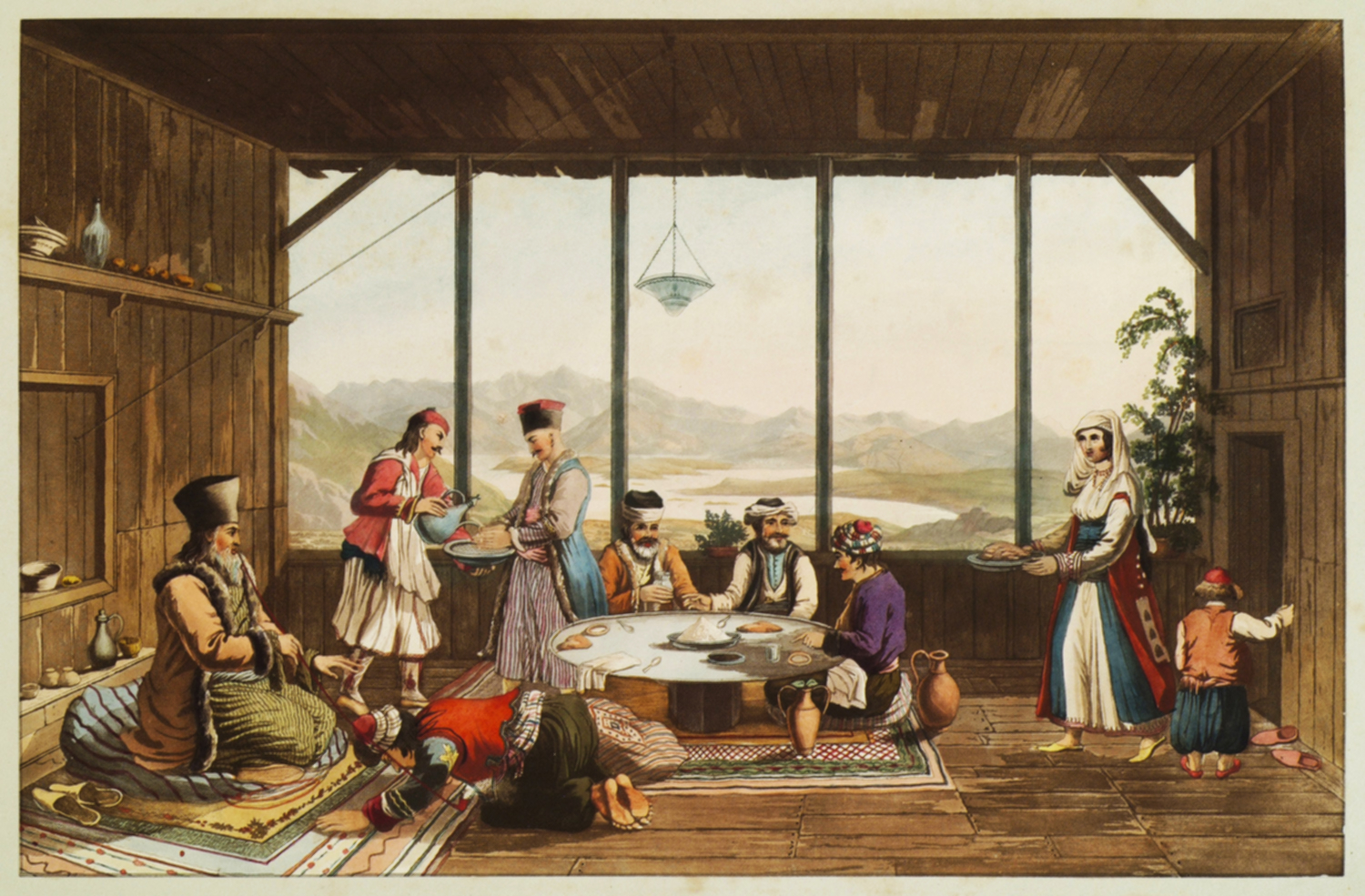
Dinner in the house of the Bishop of Amphissa in 1821, by Edward Edward

The region of Salona was conquered by the Ottomans in 1394. In 1580, a huge earthquake destroyed several towns in Phocis, including Salona. After a period of Venetian rule from 1687 to 1697, Salona devolved to the Ottomans again; several foreign travellers visited the town, which had about 6,000 inhabitants at the time. Salona had lost the former splendor and nothing was left to remind the glorious past of ancient Amphissa, so as some of the visitors misbelieved that it was the town of ancient Delphi or Kirra. In the 18th century, Salona became the center of preparations for the war against the Ottoman Turks in Central Greece, due to its strategic location and its proximity to the klephts of Giona and Parnassus mountains.

In the Greek War of Independence, Salona was the first town of Central Greece to revolt under the leadership of Panourgias, Giannis Diovouniotis, Ioannis Gouras and its bishop Isaiah, who were in cooperation with Athanasios Diakos, Yannis Makriyannis and others originated from Phocis. On 27 March 1821, Panourgias invaded the town and on April 10 the Greeks captured the Castle of Salona, the first fortress which fell in Greek hands, and extinguished the six hundred people of the Ottoman garrison in it.

On 15–20 November 1821, a council was held in Salona, where the main local notables and military chiefs participated. Under the direction of Theodoros Negris, they set down a proto-constitution for the region, the "Legal Order of Eastern Continental Greece" (Νομική Διάταξις της Ανατολικής Χέρσου Ελλάδος), and established a governing council, the Areopagus of Eastern Continental Greece, composed of 71 notables from Eastern Greece, Thessaly and Macedonia. Salona became the capital of Eastern Continental Greece and the regime existed until the Ottoman recapture of East Greece in 1825.

== Culture and sites of interest ==
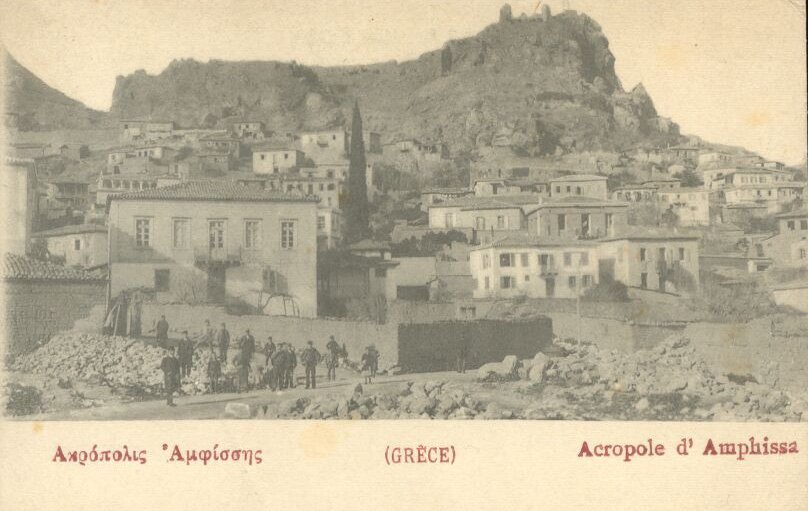
View of Amphissa in a 1918 postcard.

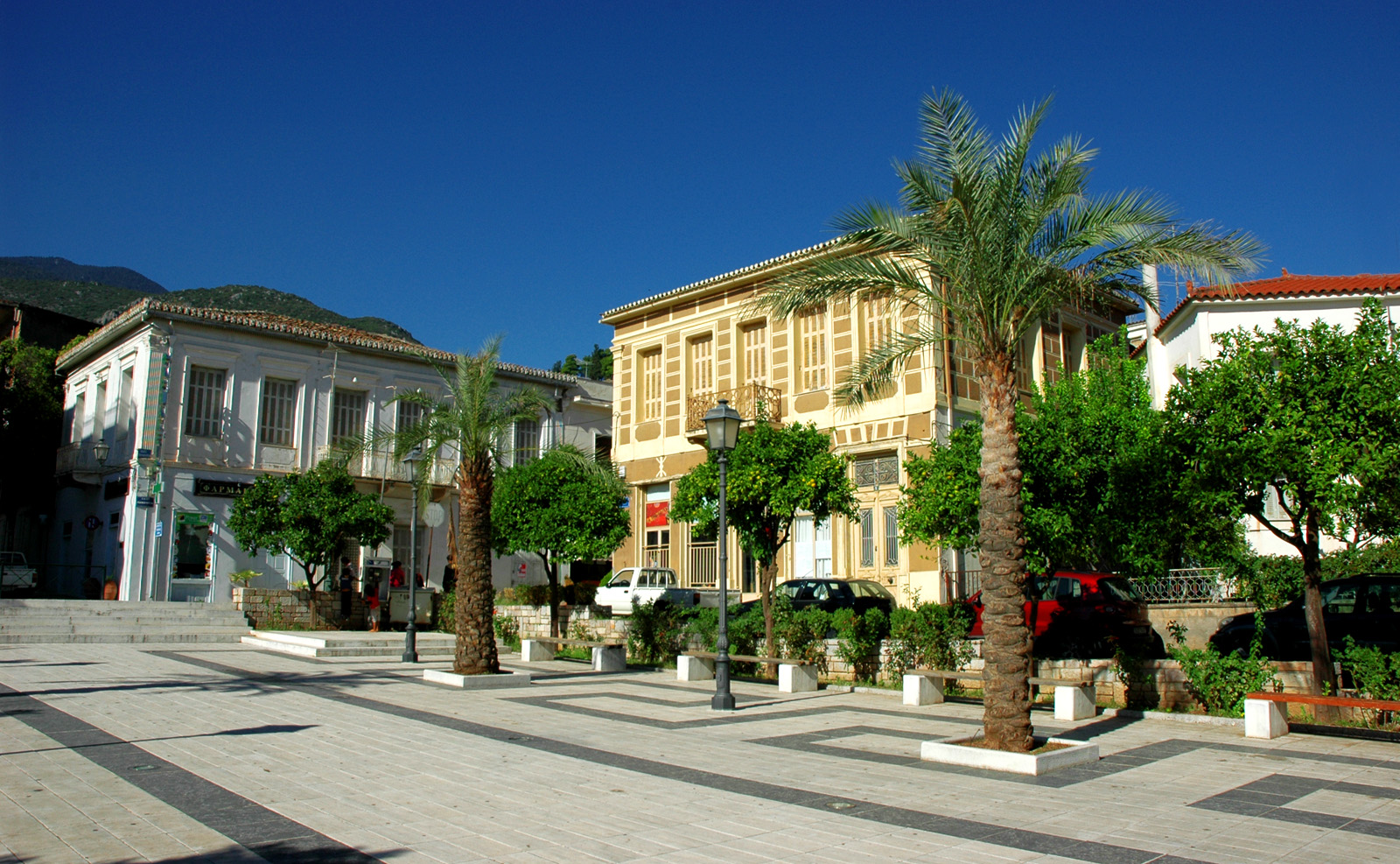
Square of the town

Much of the town's culture is the result of private legacies left to it; some of the benefactors were Markidis, Giagtzis and Stallos. Landmarks include the Castle of Salona, also known as the Castle of Oria, where the ancient acropolis stood, the Archaeological Museum of Amphissa, the Annunciation Cathedral with its murals by Spyros Papaloukas, several smaller museums and the district of Charmaina where the traditional bells are produced. The Municipal Library of Amphissa, which was founded in 1957, hosts, apart from its large number of books, a collection of traditional paintings of Phocis.

Other older sites are the Byzantine Savior Church, built in the 11th century, the paleochristian baptistery of the 3rd century next to the Cathedral, Lykotrypa which is a Mycenaean tomb on the eastern edge of the town and the Folklore Museum of Amphissa. There are also a university department affiliated to the Agricultural University of Athens, an IEK and a lyceum.

There are ample opportunities for hiking and camping on the mountains. Amphissa contains several plateias, an odeon, a chorus, a public philharmonic, but is also known for its annual carnival.

Amfissa is home to football club Fokikos.

== Historical population ==
Year	City population	Municipal unit population
1981	7,156	–
1991	7,189	9,469
2001	6,946	9,248
2011	6,919	8,370
2021	6,334	7,761

== Climate ==
Amphissa has a hot-summer Mediterranean climate.

Climate data for Amphissa (168m)
Month	Jan	Feb	Mar	Apr	May	Jun	Jul	Aug	Sep	Oct	Nov	Dec	Year
Mean daily maximum °C (°F)	12.3 (54.1)	14.8 (58.6)	18.1 (64.6)	19.9 (67.8)	26.5 (79.7)	31.7 (89.1)	34.1 (93.4)	34.6 (94.3)	30.6 (87.1)	25.3 (77.5)	19.5 (67.1)	15.7 (60.3)	23.6 (74.5)
Mean daily minimum °C (°F)	2.2 (36.0)	3.1 (37.6)	5 (41)	7.4 (45.3)	10.9 (51.6)	16.7 (62.1)	21.1 (70.0)	22.1 (71.8)	18.6 (65.5)	12.4 (54.3)	10.1 (50.2)	6.5 (43.7)	11.3 (52.4)
Average precipitation mm (inches)	134 (5.3)	34.7 (1.37)	41.5 (1.63)	40.3 (1.59)	33.6 (1.32)	9.9 (0.39)	29.7 (1.17)	29.9 (1.18)	82.2 (3.24)	43.6 (1.72)	55 (2.2)	73.5 (2.89)	607.9 (24)
Source: http://penteli.meteo.gr/stations/amfissa/ (2019 – 2020 averages)

== Notable people ==
- Christos Karouzos, archaeologist

== See also ==
- List of Crusader castles
