= Irakleia, Phthiotis =

Irakleia Ηράκλεια
- Community
- Location within the regional unit

- Location within Greece
- Coordinates: 38°48′N 22°26′E
- Country: Greece
- Administrative region: Central Greece
- Regional unit: Phthiotis
- Municipality: Lamia
- Municipal unit: Gorgopotamos

Population (2021)
  - Community: 369
- Time zone: UTC+2 (EET)
  - Summer (DST): UTC+3 (EEST)
- Vehicle registration: ΜΙ

Irakleia (Greek: Ηράκλεια) is a village in Phthiotis, Greece. It is located in the plain between Mount Oeta and the Malian Gulf, near the city of Lamia.

In the Ottoman period it was known as Moustafabei (Μουσταφάμπεη), after a local Ottoman landlord. It retained this name until 4 July 1915, when it was renamed to Irakleia Trachinias (Ηράκλεια Τραχινίας), after the nearby ancient city of Heraclea in Trachis. It received its present name on 16 October 1940.

Since the establishment of the independent Kingdom of Greece, the settlement has been part of the Phthiotis Prefecture (originally in 1835–1899 and again in 1909–1943 the Phthiotis and Phocis Prefecture). It belonged first to the Municipality of the Oeteans (20 April 1835), then the Municipality of the Heracleots (2 July 1841), before becoming an independent community (Κοινότης Μουσταφάμπεη) on 31 August 1912. With the Kapodistrias reform of 1997, it became part of the municipality of Gorgopotamos, and since the 2011 local government reform it is part of the municipality of Lamia and the municipal unit of Gorgopotamos. Population was 369 in the 2021 census.
