= Yiannis Dyovouniotis =

Greek revolutionary (1757–1831)

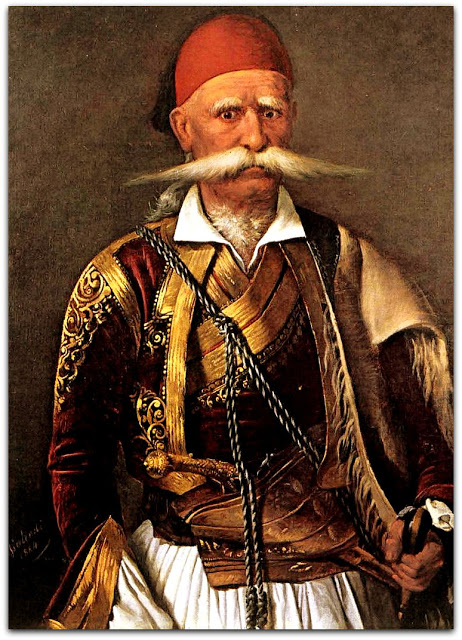
Portrait of Yiannis Dyovouniotis by painter Spyridon Prosalentis

Yiannis Xykis (Greek: Γιάννης Ξύκης; 1757–1831), more commonly known as Dyovouniotis (Greek: Δυοβουνιώτης), was a Greek chieftain in Roumeli and a hero of the Greek War of Independence.

== Early life ==
He was born in 1757 to Triantafyllia and Kostas Xykis, at the village of Dyo Vouna in Phthiotis. At the age of 13 he saw his father getting hanged by the Ottomans, an event which had a decisive influence on his life. As a teenager, he went to the armatoliki of Andrikos Verousis and became his henchman.

== Greek War of Independence ==
In 1770 he participated in the Orlov Revolt against the Ottomans.

In 1820 he joined the Filiki Eteria and since then he started to lay the groundwork for the beginning of the revolution in Central Greece. Around the same time he met with Athanasios Diakos who decided to halt the Ottoman advance into Roumeli by taking defensive positions near Thermopylae. During this battle (Battle of Alamana) Dyovouniotis defended the bridge of Gorgopotamos. However, the battle was lost and Diakos was impaled.

After the catastrophe in the Battle of Alamana, Dyovouniotis was called by Ali Pasha of Ioannina to serve him. However he refused, resulting in Ali Pasha kidnapping his son and holding him hostage. His son somehow managed to escape, but was then captured again, this time by Hurshid Pasha. Despite the kidnapping of his son, Dyovouniotis headed to Gravia and took key positions in the fierce battle which took place on 8 May. After the end of the battle, he called on the chiefs to close the passage to the Vasilika of Boeotia, believing that the Ottomans would seek to pass through that point. On the eve of the battle, Hurshid Pasha was forced to exchange Dyovouniotis' son with an Ottoman soldier who had been taken hostage by the Greeks.

His most important contribution during the Greek War of Independence was his intelligent plan to intercept the army of Beyran Pasha at the Battle of Vasilika on August 26, 1821. Dyovouniotis, along with other chieftains of Roumeli, waited for the army in the straits of the village and literally decimated it. The victory in this battle thwarted the Ottomans' plans to strengthen the besieged Tripolitsa and destroy the Greek Revolution. At the age of 65, he was forced to resign from the command of his military corps and was awarded the honorary title of general.
