= Siderokastron =

Medieval fortified settlement in Greece

Coordinates: 38°45′54.4″N 22°24′13.7″E

Siderokastron (Greek: Σιδηρόκαστρον) was a medieval fortified settlement on Mount Oeta in Central Greece.

Siderokastron was first mentioned in the 13th century. Some scholars have identified it with a place on Mount Knemis (Buchon), Delphi or Arachova (Gregorovius), or Heraclea Trachis (Neroutsos), but based on the description in the Chronicle of the Morea, it is most likely to be identified with the ruined fortified settlement on a rocky plateau found on an eastern outlier of Mount Oeta, on the banks of the upper course of the Asopos River near the modern villages of Pavliani and Koumaritsi. This identification was made by G. Kolias in 1933.

Its name ("Iron Castle" in Greek) possibly derives from the nearby pass of Sideroporta, which gave it a certain strategic importance, as it controlled the mountain roads from the Asopos to the Boeotic Cephissus, and to Dyo Vouna. It is one of the castles popularly known as "Kastro tis Orias". Today it is known as "Kouvelos" (Κούβελος).

It is first mentioned in 1275 as one of the castles ceded by the ruler of Thessaly, John I Doukas, to the Duchy of Athens, as the dowry of his daughter Helena Angelina Komnene. Sometime between 1318 and 1327, it was conquered by the Catalan Company, which had taken over the Duchy of Athens. Except for an (uncertain) brief occupation by Albanian raiders in 1367, it remained in the hands of various Catalan families at least up to 1382, and possibly until the Ottoman conquest of the County of Salona in 1392. After that, it lost its importance as a border fortress and was abandoned.

Today the site is abandoned and accessible only on foot from Pavliani. Until World War II, large portions of the fortifications survived, but today only a few remnants of two defensive walls, running in north-south direction, survive.

== Sources ==
- Bon, Antoine (1937). "Forteresses médiévales de la Grèce centrale". Bulletin de Correspondance Hellénique. 61: 139–142. doi:10.3406/bch.1937.2728.
- Koder, Johannes; Hild, Friedrich (1976). Tabula Imperii Byzantini, Band 1: Hellas und Thessalia (in German). Vienna: Verlag der Österreichischen Akademie der Wissenschaften. ISBN 978-3-7001-0182-6.
