= Eleftherochori, Phthiotis =

Eleftherochori Ελευθεροχώρι
- Community
- Location within Greece
- Coordinates: 38°45′49″N 22°27′22″E
- Country: Greece
- Administrative region: Central Greece
- Regional unit: Phthiotis
- Municipality: Lamia
- Municipal unit: Gorgopotamos

Population (2021)
  - Community: 46
- Time zone: UTC+2 (EET)
  - Summer (DST): UTC+3 (EEST)

Eleftherochori (Greek: Ελευθεροχώρι) is a village in Phthiotis, Central Greece. It is part of the municipality of Lamia, and the municipal unit of Gorgopotamos. According to the 2021 census, its population was 46.

The village lies on the northwestern side of Mount Kallidromo, above the Asopos River ravine; to its east lay the castle of Myropoles (Μυροπώλης), now named Fylaki (Φυλακή), built under Justinian I in the 6th century and connected through a wall with Heraclea Trachis.
