= Alcidas =

5th-century BC Spartan admiral

Alcidas (Ancient Greek: Ἀλκίδας) was a Spartan navarch during the Peloponnesian War.

== Biography ==
He was first appointed to lead 40 allied ships in the Spartan expedition to Mytilene in 427 BC. This was part of a double movement meant to hinder the Athenians from sending help to Lesbos, the other part being an allied invasion of Attica. However, the rebellion of Mytilene was crushed before his force could arrive, largely due to the leisurely pace with which Alcidas led the fleet, and he was forced to put into Embatum in Erythrae seven days after the town capitulated. Alcidas was then urged by Teutiaplus, an Elean, to attack Mytilene anyway, as the Athenians would most assuredly be taken by surprise, but Alcidas acted with typical Spartan hesitance and refused. Trying another approach, some Ionian exiles advised him to capture a town in Ionia and use it as "a base for effecting the revolt of Ionia." Thucydides states that this idea had merit, as the Spartans were "welcome everywhere", and the loss of Ionia would be a serious blow to Athenian resources. However, Alcidas refused this offer as well, as he "was eager to find himself back in Peloponnese as soon as possible".

After these events Alcidas led his fleet to Cyllene and found that Brasidas had been sent to him in the capacity of "counsellor", showing the Spartan disapproval of his results at Lesbos. The Spartans then resolved to strengthen the fleet and send it to Corcyra where "a revolution had broken out" and to arrive speedily before the Athenians could send succor. Brasidas and Alcidas prepared accordingly, and together they defeated a fleet of Corcyrean ships, then fled when word reached them that 60 Athenian ships from Leucas under the command of Eurymedon had been dispatched to intercept them.

Later, Alcidas was one of the three Spartans sent to found the colony of Heraclea in Trachis in 426 BC. Heraclea was "distant about four miles and a half from Thermopylae, and two miles and a quarter from the sea." Thucydides states that the Spartans wished to found this colony "because it would lie conveniently for the purposes of the war against the Athenians. A fleet might be assembled there to go against Euboea...and the town would also be useful as a station on the road to Thrace."

== Primary sources ==
- Thucydides, History of the Peloponnesian War, Book III. See original text in Perseus Project.
