= Gorgopotamos (river) =

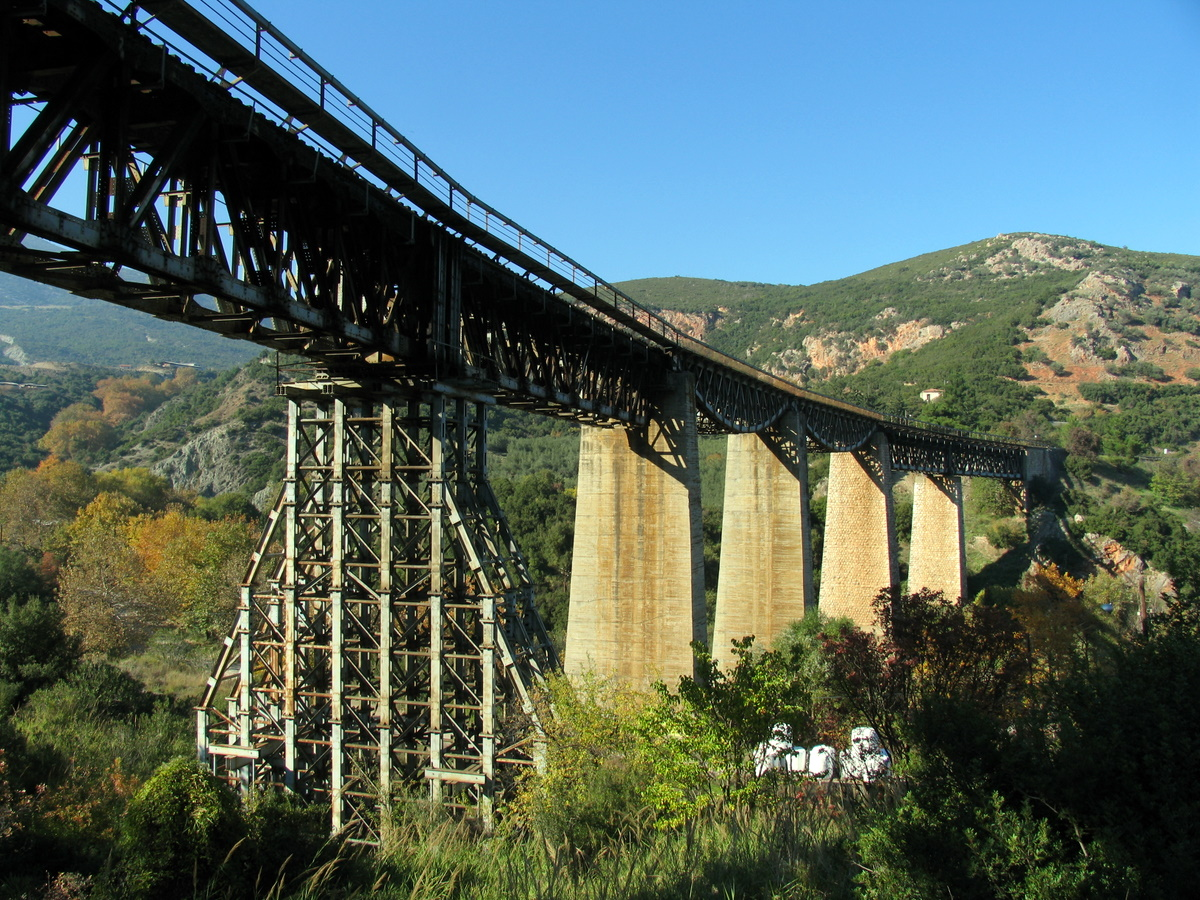
- Bridge over the Gorgopotamos
- Native name: Γοργοπόταμος (Greek)

Location
- Country: Greece

Physical characteristics
- Source
  - location: Mount Oeta, Phthiotis
- Mouth
  - location: Spercheios
  - coordinates: 38°51′22″N 22°25′0″E
  - elevation: 10 m (33 ft)
- Length: approx. 15 km (9.3 mi)

Basin features
- Progression: Spercheios→ Aegean Sea

The Gorgopotamos (Greek: Γοργοπόταμος, "the rushing river") is a river in the southern part of Phthiotis, Central Greece, Greece not far from the border with Phocis. The river is host to the Ellinopygosteos fish (Pungitius hellenicus). According to ancient philosopher Herodotos, the river was called Dyras in ancient times.

== Geography ==
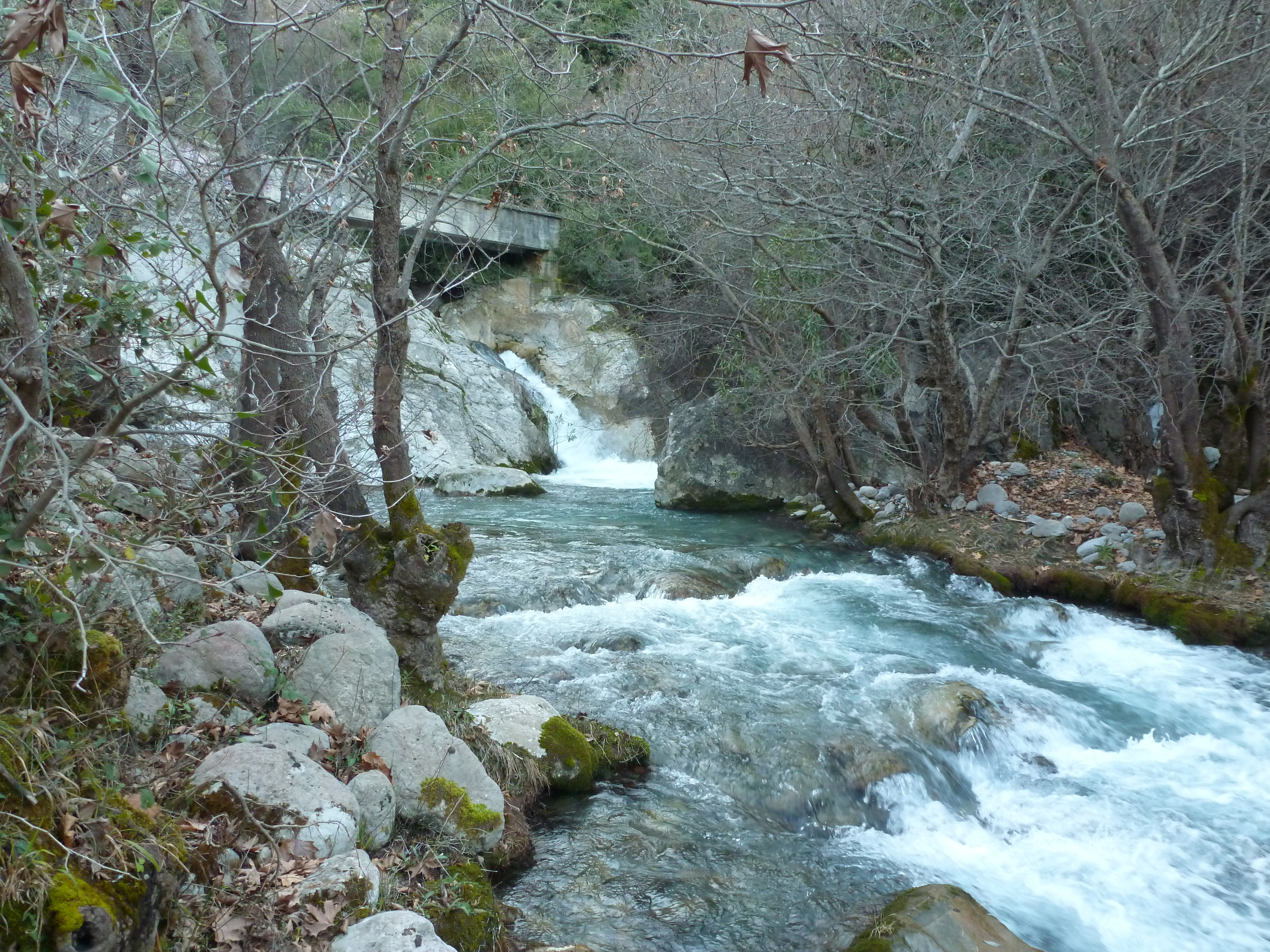
Gorgopotamos river

The Gorgopotamos rises 4 km north of Pavliani and west of Koumaritsi in the Oiti mountains with two streams. The river flows through a steep forested valley. It passes under OSE's Athens-Thessaloniki railway line and through the village Gorgopotamos, where it enters the plains. It empties into the river Spercheios near Ydromilos, 5 km southwest of Lamia.

== History ==
The railway bridge over the river is famous for one of the biggest sabotage acts of World War II, "Operation Harling". Operation Harling was a British mission and 150 Greek partisans blew it up on 25 November 1942, cutting off German supplies being transported between Athens and Thessaloniki (mostly headed for Africa). The blast destroyed two of the six piers of the bridge. The IV Ferrovieri Battalion, of the Ferrovieri Engineer Regiment of the Royal Italian Army repaired the bridge in 19 days, replacing the destroyed piers with the still existing steel girders. The area around the bridge is now a monument. The engineer who designed and built the original bridge was an Italian immigrant and Gorgopotamos local by the name of Agostino Tacconi, who used clever engineering at the time utilising unique parts making the bridge difficult to reconstruct in a timely manner. The British forces found this to be ideal as the occupation forces could not easily reconstruct it.

== See also ==
- List of rivers in Greece
- Gorgopotamos
