= Apeitheion =

City in ancient Thessaly

Apeitheion was a city of Malis in ancient Thessaly.

Its location is unknown.
