= Aigoneia =

Aigoneia (Ancient Greek: Αἰγώνεια), also Aigone (Αἰγώνη), was a town in Malis in ancient Thessaly. It was mentioned by Lycophron and Stephanus of Byzantium. Its site has not been located.
