= Kolakeia (Malis) =

Kolakeia (Ancient Greek: Κολακεία) was a town in Malis in ancient Thessaly. It is mentioned by Theopompus. Its site has not been located.
