= Oetaeans =

Ancient Greek tribe

- Ancient Greek: Οἰταῖοι or Οἰταεῖς
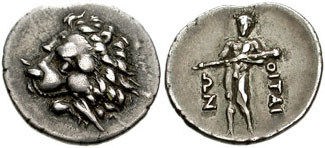
- Oetaean Hemidrachm showing a Heracles with the ethnonym ΟΙΤΑΙΩΝ ('of the Oetaeans'), ca. 400-344 BC

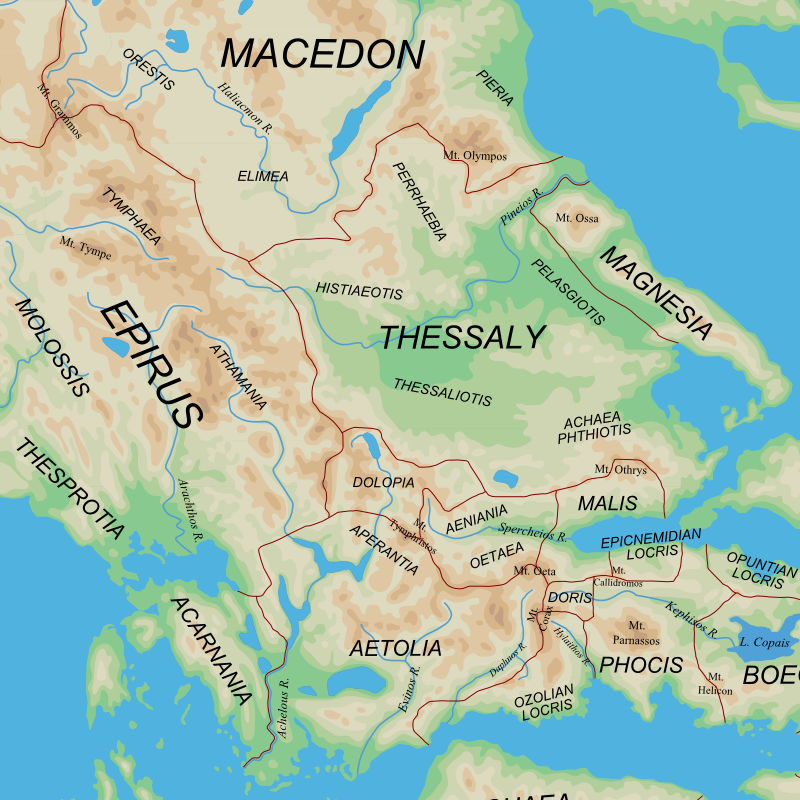
- Oetaea can be seen on the northern border of Aetolia.
- Named after: Mount Oeta

The Oetaeans or Oitaians (Ancient Greek: Οἰταῖοι or Οἰταεῖς) were a relatively small ancient Greek tribe living on and around Mount Oeta, in Central Greece.

== Location ==
The Oeteans occupied the region of Oetaea or Oitaia (Οἰταῖα), encompassing Mount Oeta and its northern and southern outliers, bounded by the Spercheios River to the north and east and the Boeotic Cephissus to the south. They were surrounded by other small tribal regions, Malis, Doris, and Aenis, the borders to which were not always clear and fluctuated over time. The Pyre of Heracles on Mount Oeta was their most significant sanctuary. Heracles was honoured with games every four years, and the chief city of the region, Heraclea in Trachis, was named after him.

== Government and society ==
The Oeteans are first attested by the 5th-century historian Herodotus during his description of the Battle of Thermopylae. They apparently had a separate political identity by the 5th century, as they were invited by the Athenian statesman Pericles to a panhellenic congress in 449/8 BC, they participated in the Delphic Amphictyony (where their vote was cast by a citizen of Heraclea), and minted coins with the demonym 'Oetaeans' in the 4th century. The 1st-century geographer Strabo claims that Oetaea was divided into fourteen demes, but their exact identity is uncertain, and modern attempts to reconstruct them include mutilated names and toponyms that are scarcely attested. The nature and organization of the various communities attested is likewise unclear, making it difficult to say if the early Oetaean polity was tribal in nature or based on a league of city-states (poleis).

== Alliances ==
Heraclea, and with it likely the rest of Oetaea, entered the Aetolian League in 280 BC. Many Oetaeans received Aetolian citizenship and rose in the highest offices of the League, but Oetaea likely retained a separate identity and organization, as it still struck its own coins (albeit after the Aetolian pattern). Aetolian domination lasted until c. 166 BC, after which the Oetaean League (Ancient Greek: τὸ κοινὸν τῶν Οἰταῖων, romanized: to koinon ton Oitaion) is attested in inscriptions. The League's chief city and seat of its treasury was Heraclea, and two federal bodies are attested, the magistrates known as boularcheontes and the priestly college of the hierothytai. The League may have been short-lived, as in 147 BC Heraclea is attested as being a member of the Achaean League, but the appointment of religious officials to the Delphic Amphictyony in 134 BC and 117 BC "implies a minimal communal organization", according to historian Denis Rousset. By the 1st century BC, when Greece was firmly under Roman rule, the Oetaeans disappeared from the sources, and Oetaea itself was counted as part of Thessaly.

== Sources ==
- Kirsten, Ernst (1937). "Oitaioi". Realencyclopädie der Classischen Altertumswissenschaft, Band XVII, Halbband 34, Numen bis Olympia (in German). Stuttgart: Alfred Druckenmüller. col. 2289–2294.
- Rousset, Denis (2015). "Microfederalism in Central Greece: the Dorians and Oitaians". In Beck, Hans; Funke, Peter (eds.). Federalism in Greek Antiquity. Cambridge: Cambridge University Press. pp. 222–230. ISBN 978-0-521-19226-2.

== Links ==
Media related to Oetaeans at Wikimedia Commons
