= Heraclea in Trachis =

Ancient city of central Greece

- Ἡράκλεια ἡ ἐν Τραχῖνι (Ancient Greek)
- Trachis (Τραχίς)
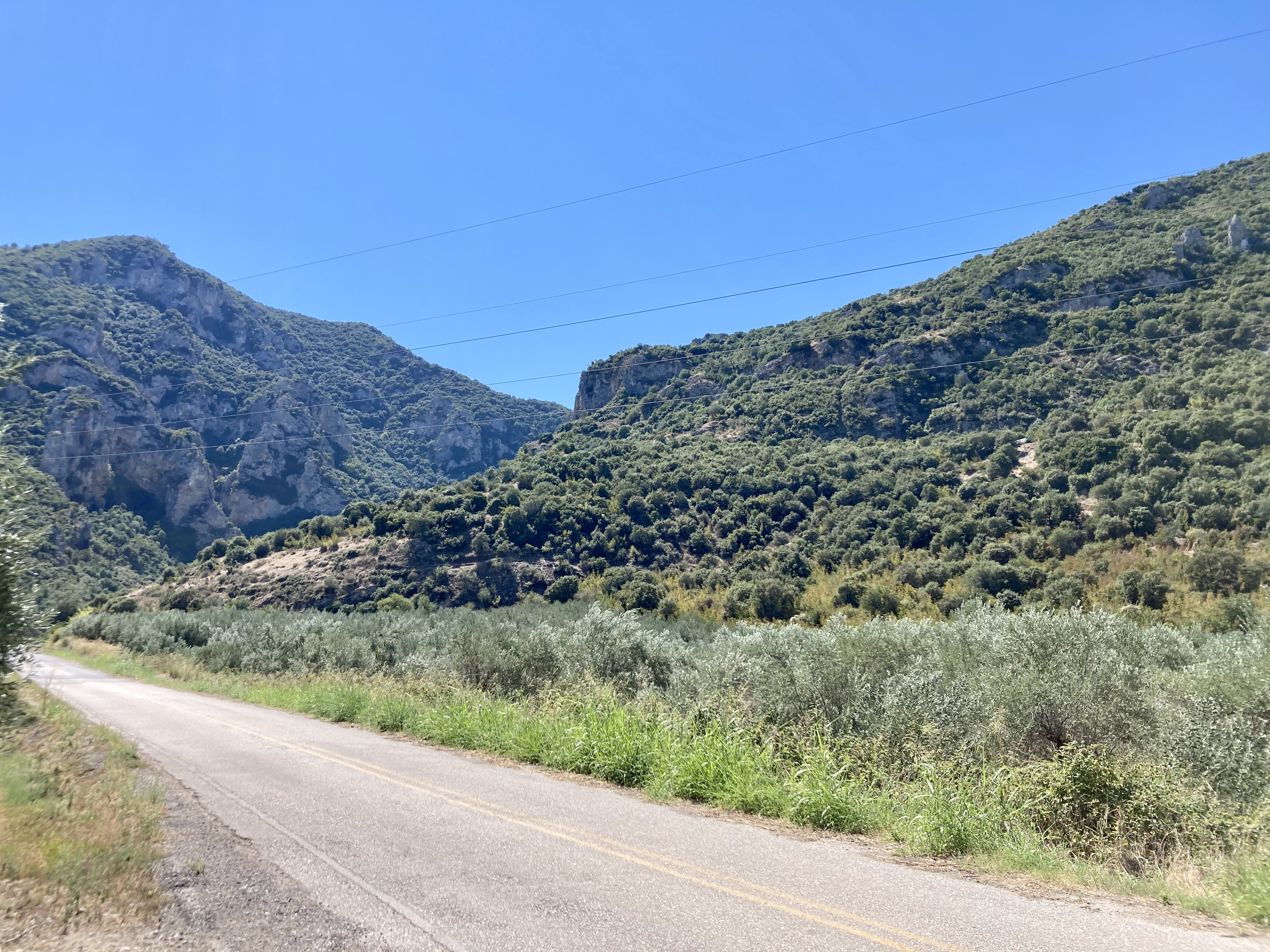
- The site of Heraclea in Trachis.

- Location within Greece
- 38°47′27″N 22°26′33″E
- Location: Greece
- Region: Central Greece

Heraclea (Herakleia) in Trachis (Ancient Greek: Ἡράκλεια ἡ ἐν Τραχῖνι), also called Heraclea Trachinia (Ἡράκλεια ἡ Τραχινία), was a colony founded by the Spartans in 426 BC, the sixth year of the Peloponnesian War. It was also a polis (city-state).

== Situation ==
Originally called Trachis (Τραχίς), or by Strabo, Trachin (Τραχίν), the city was in the region of Malis, in the district called after, it Trachinia. It was located on a rocky plateau above the left bank of the Asopos River, at the point where it leaves Mount Oeta for the plain of Lamia. It stood in a little to the north or rather west of Thermopylae, thus commanding the approach to Thermopylae from Thessaly, and was, from its position, of great military importance. The entrance to the Trachinian plain was only half a plethrum [50 feet (15 m)] in breadth, but the surface of the plain was 22,000 plethra [8 miles (13 km)], according to Herodotus. The same writer states that the city Trachis was 5 stadia from the river Melas, and that the river Asopus issued from a gorge in the mountains, to the south of Trachis. According to Thucydides, Trachis was 40 stadia from Thermopylae and 20 from the sea. Trachis (as Trachin) is mentioned in the Catalogue of Ships in the Iliad by Homer as one of the cities subject to Achilles, and is celebrated in the legends of Herakles as the scene of his death.

== History ==
It became a place of historical importance in consequence of the colony founded here by the Lacedaemonians in the sixth year of the Peloponnesian War, 426 BC. The Trachinians (a tribe of the Malians) and the neighbouring Dorians, who suffered much from the predatory incursions of the Oetaean mountaineers, solicited aid from the Spartans, who eagerly availed themselves of this opportunity to plant a strong colony in this commanding situation. They issued an invitation to the other Dorian states of Greece to join in the colony; and as many as 10,000 colonists, under three Spartan oecists (Leon, Alcidas, and Damagon), built and fortified a new town, to which the name of Heraclea was given, from the great hero, whose name was so closely associated with the surrounding district. It was usually called the Trachinian Heraclea, to distinguish it from other places of the same name, and by later writers Heraclea in Phthiotis (Ἡράκλεια Φθιώτιδος), as this district was subsequently included in the Thessalian Phthiotis. Thucydides also tells us that the Spartans thought the town would "lie conveniently for the purposes of the war with Athens." From Heraclea the Spartans could ready a fleet to threaten Euboea, and the town would be "a useful station on the road to Thrace."

The new colonists also built a port with docks near Thermopylae. It was generally expected that this city, under the protection of Sparta, would become a formidable power in Northern Greece; however, soon after the town was founded, things began to go quite badly. It was attacked from the beginning by the Thessalians, who regarded its establishment as an invasion of their territory; and the Spartans, who rarely succeeded in the government of dependencies, displayed haughtiness and corruption in its administration. Hence the city rapidly dwindled down. Six years after its founding a battle took place between the inhabitants of Heraclea and the assembled forces of the Aenianes, Dolopes, Malians, and Thessalians who were directly menaced by the colony. Sparta was unable at the time to send assistance to their colony; the Heracleots were defeated, and the town so reduced that in the following year, the Boeotians occupied it to prevent it falling into Athenian hands, and dismissed the Lacedaemonian governor, on the ground of misconduct. Thucydides tells us that the Spartans were "offended at the Boeotians for what they had done."

The Lacedaemonians, however, regained possession of the place; and in the winter of 409-408 BC, they experienced here another disaster, 700 of the Heracleots being slain in battle, together with the Lacedaemonian harmost (military governor). But, after the Peloponnesian War, Heraclea again rose into importance, and became the headquarters of the Spartan power in Northern Greece. In 399 BC, Herippidas the Lacedaemonian, was sent there to repress some factious movements in Heraclea; and he not only put to death all the opponents of the Lacedaemonians in the town, but expelled the neighbouring Oetaeans and Trachinians from their abodes. In 395 BC, the Thebans, under the command of Ismenias, wrested this important place from the Spartans, killed the Lacedaemonian garrison, and gave the city to the old Trachinian and Oetaean inhabitants.

The walls of Heraclea were destroyed by Jason of Pherae, lest any state should seize this place and prevent him from marching into Greece. At a later time Heraclea came into the hands of the Aetolians, and was one of the main sources of their power in Northern Greece. After the defeat of Antiochus III at the Battle of Thermopylae (191 BC), Heraclea was besieged by the Roman consul Acilius Glabrio, who divided his army into four bodies, and directed his attacks upon four points at once; one body being stationed on the river Asopus, where was the gymnasium; the second near the citadel outside of the walls (extra muros), which was almost more thickly inhabited than the city itself; the third towards the Maliac Gulf; and the fourth on the river Melas, opposite the temple of Diana. The country around was marshy, and abounded in lofty trees. After a siege of twenty-four days the Romans succeeded in taking the town, and the Aetolians retired to the citadel. On the following day the consul seized a rocky summit, equal to the citadel in height, and separated from it only by a chasm so narrow that the two summits were within reach of a missile. Thereupon the Aetolians surrendered the citadel. William Martin Leake, who visited the site in the early 19th century, remarks that it seems quite clear from this account of Livy that the city occupied the low ground between the rivers Karvunariá (Asopus) and Mavra-Néria (Melas), extending from the one to the other, as well as a considerable distance into the plain in a south-eastern direction. There are still some vestiges of the citadel upon a lofty rock above; and upon its perpendicular sides there are many catacombs excavated. "The distance of the citadel above the town justifies the words extra muros, which Livy applies to it, and may explain also the assertion of Strabo, that Heraclea was six stadia distant from the ancient Trachis; for, although the town of Heraclea seems to have occupied the same position as the Trachis of Herodotus, the citadel, which, according to Livy, was better inhabited in the Aetolian War than the city, may very possibly have been the only inhabited part of Heraclea two centuries later.

The city is attested at least until the 6th century, when Procopius of Caesarea mentions it as part of Justinian I's efforts to fortify the nearby pass of Thermopylae. According to Procopius, a wall was erected across the valley of the Asopos, and the town was strengthened with an otherwise unidentified fortress called Myropoles. Traces of Byzantine fortifications, as well as a cistern, survive on the site. The town was apparently abandoned in the following decades. Some modern scholars have tried to identify it with the later medieval settlements of Ravennika or Siderokastron, but these identifications are generally rejected as incompatible with the literary evidence.
