= Mount Oeta =

Mountain in Central Greece

Oeta
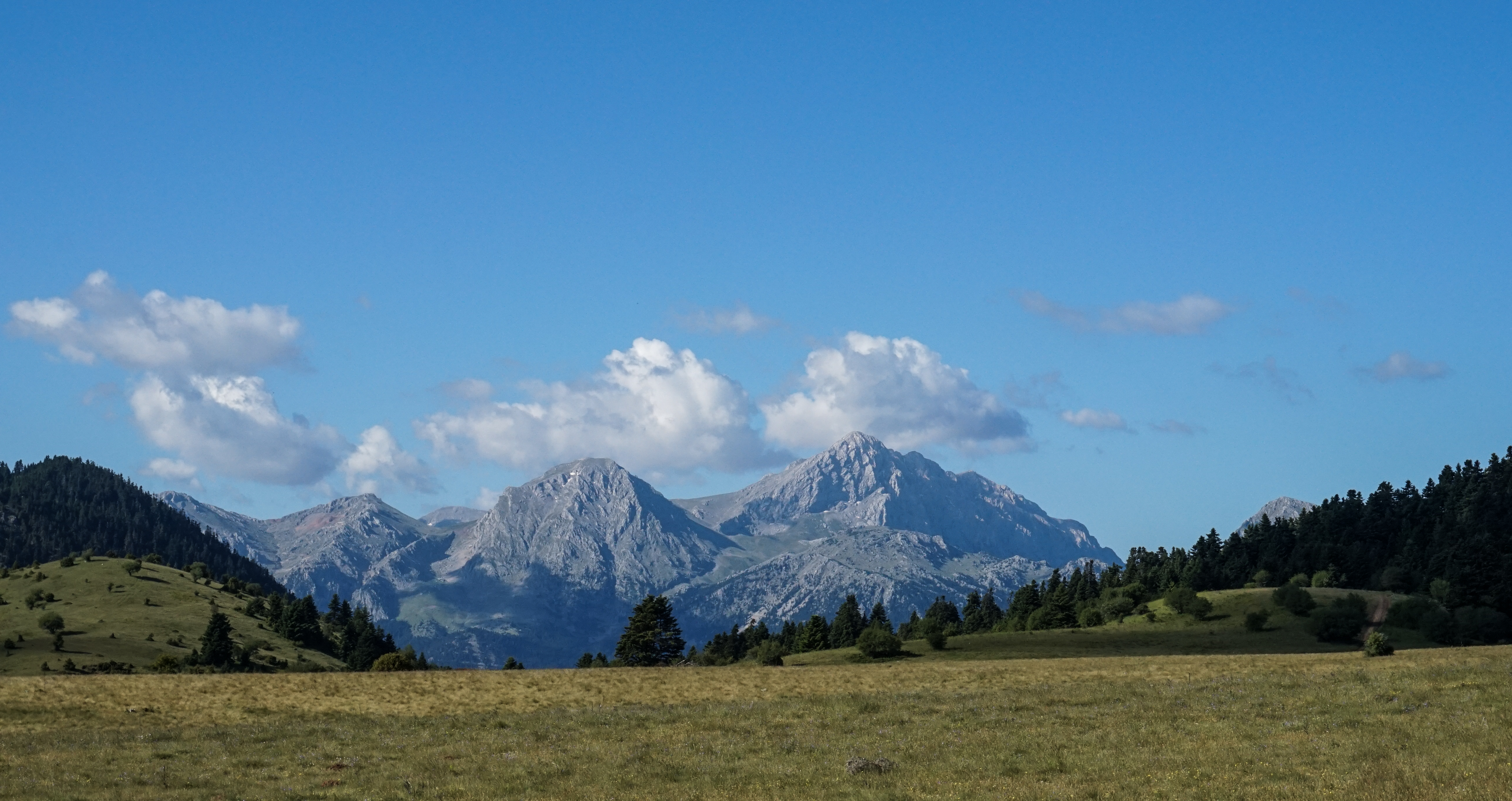
- Mount Oeta

Highest point
- Elevation: 2,152 m (7,060 ft)
- Coordinates: 38°49′43″N 22°17′19″E

Geography
- Location within Greece
- Location: Phthiotis and Phocis, Greece
- Parent range: Pindus

Mount Oeta (/ˈɛtə/; Greek: Οίτη, polytonic Οἴτη, Oiti, also transcribed as Oite) is a mountain in Central Greece. A southeastern offshoot of the Pindus range, it is 2,152 m (7,060 ft) high. Since 1966, the core area of the mountain is a national park, and much of the rest has been declared a special area under Natura 2000.

== Location and description ==
Mount Oeta is located on the boundaries of the prefectures of Phocis in the south and Phthiotis in the north. Its northern side displays a steep and inaccessible terrain as it descends to the rift valley of the Spercheios river, forming a series of deep gorges—most famous of which is that of the Gorgopotamos river—a few of which boast large waterfalls, including the Kremastos waterfall, considered the highest in Central Greece. To the east, Oeta is defined by the gorge of the Asopos (Ασωπός) river, which forms its boundary with the neighbouring Mount Kallidromo. The pass along the Asopos valley forms the chief passage between the Spercheios valley in the north and the Boeotic Cephissus valley in the south, with its northern exit close to the pass of Thermopylae. The southern slopes of Oeta are very gentle, bordering with the mountains Vardousia to the southwest and Giona to the southeast. On its western slope, Oeta is separated from Mount Goulina by the valley of the river Vistriza (Βίστριζα), ancient Inachos (Ίναχος) and the pass of Liaskovo or Mantetsi (1,200 metres (3,900 ft)). Historically, the name Oeta has been held to include Goulina or Kallidromo or both (cf. Friedrich Stählin, Das hellenische Thessalien, 1924).

Oeta has a complex hydrogeology. Limestone and flysch, coupled with a complex geomorphology, combine to create a large network of sinkholes and caverns, giving rise to many springs, small rivers, and seasonal ponds in the main plateaus, chiefly those of Livadies (Λιβαδιές), Amaliolaka (Αμαλιόλακα) and Katavothra (Καταβόθρα). Three major rivers spring forth from the mountain: Gorgopotamos and Asopos from the east, and Vistriza/Inachos from the west, all of which are tributaries of Spercheios. The streams of the southern slope flow into the river Mornos. The mountain's tallest peak, Pyrgos (Πύργος), has a height of 2,152 metres (7,060 ft), while the second-tallest is that of Greveno (Γρεβενό) at 2,117 metres (6,946 ft).

A total of 22 settlements are located on Mount Oeta:

- Argyrochori, Kombotades, Kostalexis, Loutra Ypatis, Mexiates, Sykas, and Ypati to the north
- Gorgopotamos, Dyo Vouna, and Koumaritsi to the east
- Oiti, Kastriotissa, Mavrolithari, Pavliani, and Pyra to the south
- Kapnochori, Kastania, Lychno, Mesochori, Neochori, Peristeri, and Pyrgos to the west

== National Park ==
In 1966, Mount Oeta became the sixth of Greece's national parks in accordance with Royal Decree 218/1966. With an area of 7,000 hectares, of which 3,370 form the core zone and 3,630 the periphery, the park covers approximately one fourth of the mountain's area and is the third largest in Greece. Any human activity that impacts the local environment in whatsoever way is forbidden within the national park's boundaries. The area of the national park has furthermore been declared a Special Area of Conservation as part of the Natura 2000 Network. The Gorgopotamos Gorge has also been declared a SAC, and together with the national park and the Asopos valley forms the broader "Mount Oeta National Park - Asopos Valley" Special Protected Area. Oeta also has two wildlife refuges, where hunting is forbidden: the Skasmeni Frantzi – Dyo Vouna area on the northeastern slopes, and the Oiti–Pavliani area on the southeastern. The national park and protected areas are overseen by the Management Body of Mt Oiti National Park, established as an agency of the Ministry of the Environment in 2002 (Law 3044/2002).

== Flora ==
Due to unique geomorphology, Oeta has a rich flora, with 1,149 identified plant species, and an estimated presence of c. 1,250, representing about 20% of all flora of Greece. The mountain hosts two endemic species, Veronica oetaea of the genus Veronica, and Allium lagarophyllum of the genus Allium. Veronica oetaea is found only at the Livadies plateau and considered critically endangered, while Allium lagarophyllum has been documented in the gorges of the Gorgopotamos and Asopos rivers.

The dominant species is fir (Abies cephalonica), with fir forests covering over a third of the mountain, between c. 600 metres (2,000 ft) and 1,600 metres (5,200 ft) of altitude. Black pine (Pinus nigra) is found in an isolated area on the northeast of the mountain. On the southern and western slopes there are oak forests (often mixed with fir), along with other broadleaved plants like Arbutus and Pistacia lentiscus. In the river gorges, planes, willows, and alder trees can be found.

Slightly over 10% of the mountain—a comparatively high proportion—are meadows, which along with the exposed rocky slopes are the areas of highest diversity. The mountain has a rich variety of flower species, such as lilies, croci, orchids, iris, violas, etc. It is therefore known as the "mountain of flowers". Along with the nearby Giona and Vardousia ranges, Oeta is the southernmost limit of presence for plants of northern origin, such as Actaea spicata or Rhynchocorys elephas.

== Fauna ==
Mammals in the park are roe deer, wild boar and hare. The balkan chamois lives on the mountain and is the symbol of the national park. Big predators of the region are brown bears, wolves and wildcats. The alpine newt is one of the amphibians living in the park and is endangered.

The park also hosts a great variety of bird species. Woodpecker species are present on Oiti, such as grey–headed woodpecker, the white–backed woodpecker, the black woodpecker and the syrian woodpecker. Other bird species include the ortolan bunting, the horned lark, the eurasian skylark, the tawny pipit, the alpine accentor, the black redstart, the northern wheatear, the common rock thrush, the black stork and the white–winged snowfinch. As well as a great number of rare predatory birds, for example the golden eagle, the short–toed snake eagle and the peregrine falcon.

Fish species of the parks rivers and lakes are Sperchios barbel, Macedonian chub, Sperchios spirlin, Greek trout and probably the endangered Marathon minnow.

== History ==
=== Antiquity ===
In Greek mythology, Oeta is chiefly celebrated as the scene of Heracles' death, and Roman authors even gave the demi-god the epithet Oetaeus. Prepared to die, he ascended Mount Oeta, where he built a funeral pyre, gave his bow and arrows to Philoctetes, and laid himself down on the pile, his head resting on his club, and his lion's skin spread over him, and commanded Philoctetes to apply the torch to the pyre. Another version of the story claims that Zeus threw a lightning bolt on the site of Heracles' death, and that from this place sprung forth the Gorgopotamos river. The remains of a 3rd-century BC Doric temple dedicated to Heracles and his funeral pyre (Πυρὰ Ἡρακλέους), as well as an altar and ruins of adjacent buildings, still survive at the entrance of the Katavothra plateau at a height of 1,800 m, near the village of Pavliani. The temple complex remained in use until late Roman times.

In historical times, the area of Oeta belonged to southern Thessaly, forming its southernmost district, that of Oetaea (Οἰταῖα). A city called Oeta was also said to have been founded by Amphissus, son of Apollo and Dryope, on the territory of the Malians, but most likely the city never existed, and instead refers to Oetaea or more generally the area of the Oetaean League. Further north, Hypate/Hypata (ἡ Ὑπάτη, τὰ Ὕπατα), modern Ypati, was the chief city of the Aenianes, and a member of the Aetolian League.

The women of Hypate were associated with witchcraft in Antiquity: the sorceresses Mycale and Agaonice, called the Pharmacidae, inhabited the area. Even in more recent times, the precipice of Anemotrypa near the town was said to be the haunt of the crone Lyousa Armagou.

=== Middle Ages ===
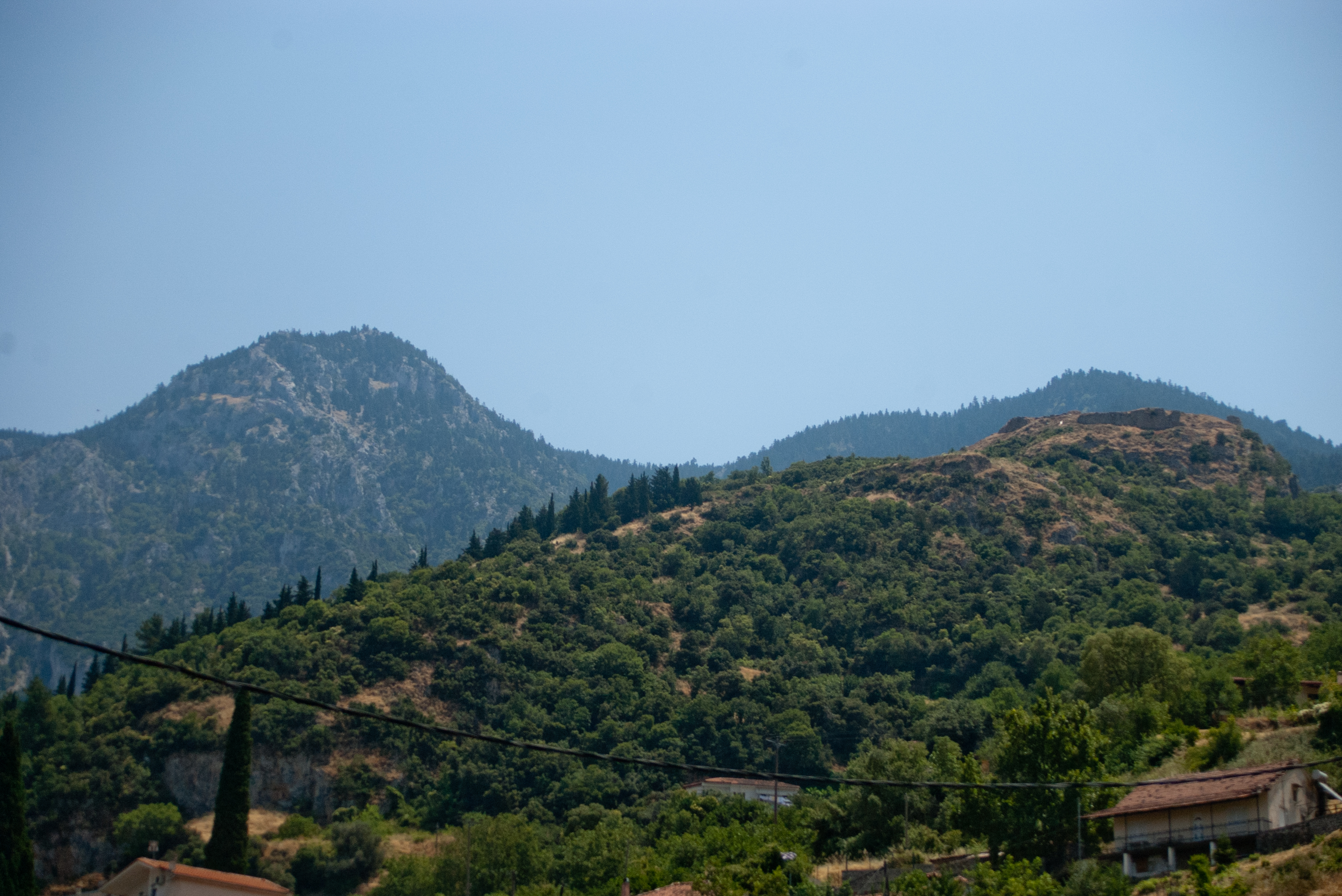
The ancient acropolis of Ypati

Hypate is still mentioned in the 6th century by the historian Procopius of Caesarea, who recorded repairs to its walls by Emperor Justinian I, and in the Synecdemus. The city may have been abandoned after the Slavic invasions of the 7th century, and reappears in the 10th century under the name Neai Patrai ("New Patras") or Patrai Helladikai ("Patras in [the theme of] Hellas"). Until the 13th century, the city is mentioned only as an ecclesiastical center, being a metropolitan bishopric with one (10th century) and eventually twelve (12th century) suffragans.

The city played a major role in the latter 13th century, when it was the capital of the independent Greek rulers of Thessaly, John I Doukas, Constantine Doukas and John II Doukas. The Catalan Company seized Neopatras and much of Phthiotis and southern Thessaly in 1319, forming the new Duchy of Neopatras, a vassal of the Duchy of Athens. It was one of the last remaining Catalan possessions in Greece, and fell to the Ottoman Turks in 1394. In the 13th and 14th centuries, the fortress town of Siderokastron was also located on the eastern slopes of Oeta. The Agathonos Monastery, dating at least to the 15th century, lies on the northern slopes of the mountain near Ypati.

=== Modern era ===
The area played an important role in the Greek Resistance movement against the Axis occupation of Greece during World War II. The destruction of the Gorgopotamos viaduct on 25 November 1942 by a joint effort of Greek Resistance forces and British saboteurs is ranked as one of the most spectacular sabotage actions in occupied Europe.

== Sources ==
- Gregory, Timothy E. (1991). "Neopatras". In Kazhdan, Alexander (ed.). The Oxford Dictionary of Byzantium. Oxford and New York: Oxford University Press. p. 1454. ISBN 0-19-504652-8.
- Kastanioti, A.; Stamellou, A. (2013). Οίτη, Ένα Βουνό Γεμάτο Ομορφιές και Μύθους / Oiti, A Mountain Full of Beauties and Myths (PDF) (in Greek and English). Loutra Ypatis: Management Body of Mt Oiti National Park.
- Kirsten, Ernst (1937). "Oite (2)". Realencyclopädie der Classischen Altertumswissenschaft. Vol. Band XVII, Halbband 34, Numen bis Olympia. Stuttgart: Alfred Druckenmüller. col. 2299.
- Koder, Johannes; Hild, Friedrich (1976). Tabula Imperii Byzantini, Band 1: Hellas und Thessalia (in German). Vienna: Verlag der Österreichischen Akademie der Wissenschaften. ISBN 978-3-7001-0182-6.
- Lenk, Brunhilde (1937). "Oite (1)". Realencyclopädie der Classischen Altertumswissenschaft. Vol. Band XVII, Halbband 34, Numen bis Olympia. Stuttgart: Alfred Druckenmüller. col. 2294–2299.
