= Moschochori =

Moschochori (Greek: Μοσχοχώρι) may refer to several places in Greece:

- Moschochori, Florina, a village in the Florina regional unit.
- Moschochori, Kozani, a village in the Kozani regional unit.
- Moschochori, Larissa, a village in the Larissa regional unit.
- Moschochori, Messenia, a village in Messenia.
- Moschochori, Phthiotis, a village in Phthiotis.
- Moschochori, Pieria, a village in Pieria.
