= Pavliani =

Pavliani Παύλιανη
- Municipal unit
- Location within the regional unit

- Location within Greece
- Coordinates: 38°44′N 22°20′E
- Country: Greece
- Administrative region: Central Greece
- Regional unit: Phthiotis
- Municipality: Lamia

Area
  - Municipal unit: 38.468 km^{2} (14.853 sq mi)

Population (2021)
  - Municipal unit: 214
  - Municipal unit density: 5.56/km^{2} (14.4/sq mi)
- Time zone: UTC+2 (EET)
  - Summer (DST): UTC+3 (EEST)
- Vehicle registration: ΜΙ

Pavliani (Greek: Παύλιανη) is a village on Mount Oeta, and a former community in Phthiotis, Greece. It is divided into two settlements, Pavliani proper or Ano Pavliani (Άνω Παύλιανη) and Nea Pavliani (Νέα Παύλιανη) or Kato Pavliani (Κάτω Παύλιανη).

== History ==
In Greek mythology, Oeta is chiefly celebrated as the scene of Heracles' death and funeral pyre. The remains of a 3rd-century BC Doric temple dedicated to Heracles and his funeral pyre (Πυρὰ Ἡρακλέους), as well as an altar and ruins of adjacent buildings, still survive at the entrance of the Katavothra plateau at a height of 1,800 m, near Pavliani. The temple complex remained in use until late Roman times. The ruins of the medieval town of Siderokastron are located to the east of the village.

With the establishment of the independent Kingdom of Greece, on 20 April 1835 Pavliani became the seat of the Municipality of Rodontia (Δήμος Ροδοντίων) of the Phocis and Locris Prefecture. The municipality comprised the nearby villages of Gardikaki (Oiti), Sklithraki, and Koumaritsi.

On 2 July 1841 the Municipality of Rodontia was dissolved and Pavliani became part of the Municipality of Irakleiotes (Δήμος Ηρακλειωτών) of the Phthiotis and Phocis Prefecture (in 1899–1909 the Phthiotis Prefecture), until it became an independent community (Κοινότης Παύλιανης) on 31 August 1912. The village was also the site of the Battle of Pavliani on 3 June 1943, by the forces of the Greek Resistance against an Italian army column. A monument dedicated to the fallen of the battle stands at the entrance of Kato Pavliani.

Pavliani remained an independent community until the 2011 local government reform, following which it is part of the municipality of Lamia, of which it is a municipal unit. The municipal unit has an area of 38.468 km^{2}. Population was 498 in the 2011 census, of whom 367 in Ano Pavliani and 131 in Kato Pavliani.

== Population ==
Historical population
Year	Pop.	±%
1889	727	—
1896	885	+21.7%
1907	972	+9.8%
1920	1,001	+3.0%
2001	287	−71.3%
2011	498	+73.5%
2021	214	−57.0%

== Sources ==
- Kastanioti, A.; Stamellou, A. (2013). Οίτη, Ένα Βουνό Γεμάτο Ομορφιές και Μύθους / Oiti, A Mountain Full of Beauties and Myths (in Greek and English). Loutra Ypatis: Management Body of Mt Oiti National Park.
- Koder, Johannes; Hild, Friedrich (1976). Tabula Imperii Byzantini, Band 1: Hellas und Thessalia (in German). Vienna: Verlag der Österreichischen Akademie der Wissenschaften. ISBN 978-3-7001-0182-6.
