= Kravasaras =

Kravasaras or Kravassaras (Greek: Κραβασ[σ]αράς) is the former, Ottoman-era name of the following Greek settlements:

- Amfilochia
- Vasilika, Boeotia
