= Gorgopotamos =

Gorgopotamos Γοργοπόταμος
- Municipal unit
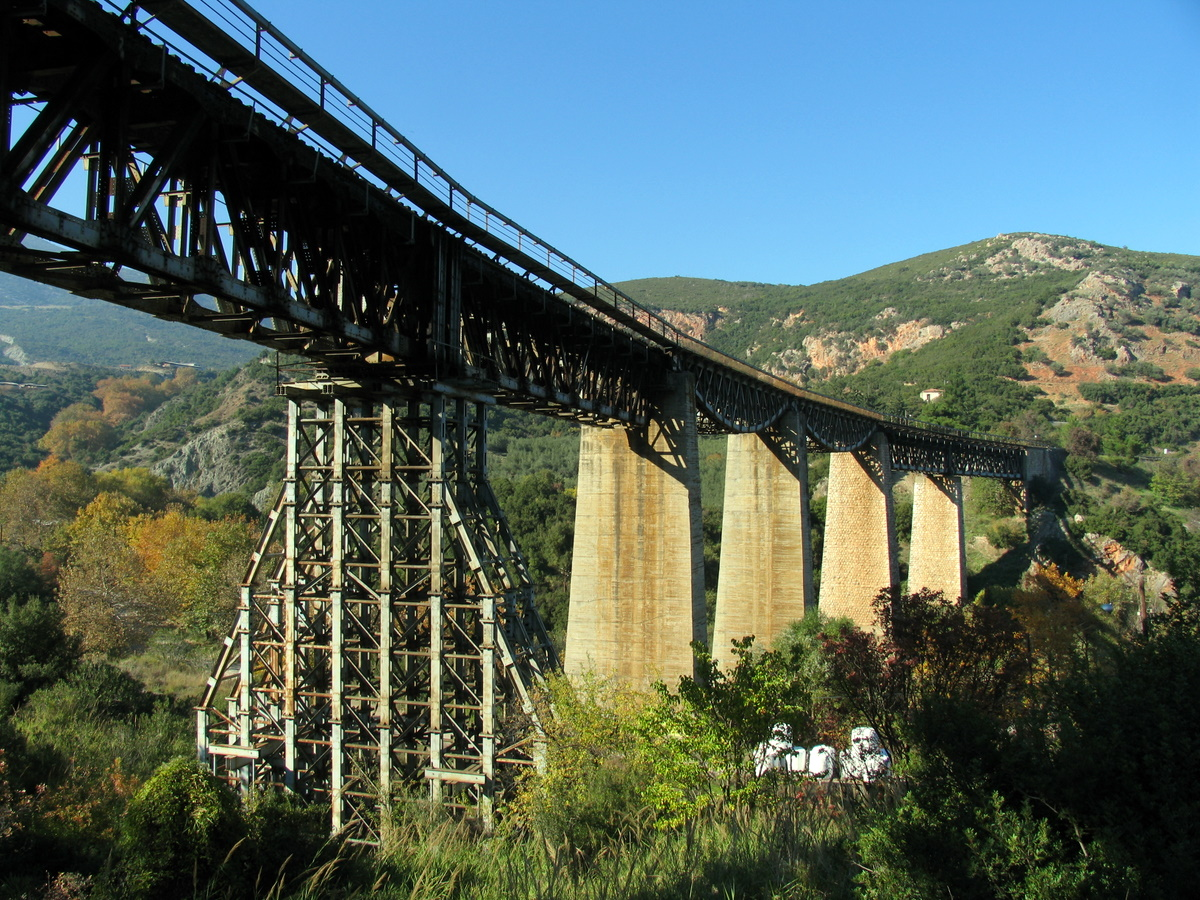
- The rail bridge of Gorgopotamos that was blown up by the Greek Resistance during WWII.

- Location within the regional unit

- Location within Greece
- Coordinates: 38°50′03″N 22°23′45″E
- Country: Greece
- Administrative region: Central Greece
- Regional unit: Phthiotis
- Municipality: Lamia

Area
  - Municipal unit: 157.3 km^{2} (60.7 sq mi)

Population (2021)
  - Municipal unit: 2,810
  - Municipal unit density: 17.9/km^{2} (46.3/sq mi)
  - Community: 380
- Time zone: UTC+2 (EET)
  - Summer (DST): UTC+3 (EEST)
- Postal code: 360 00
- Vehicle registration: ΜΙ
- Website: dimosgorgopotamou.gr

Gorgopotamos (Greek: Γοργοπόταμος) is a village and a former municipality in Phthiotis, Greece. Since the 2011 local government reform it is part of the municipality Lamia, of which it is a municipal unit. The municipal unit has an area of 157.300 km^{2}. It is located 8 km southwest of Lamia and 34 km north of Amfissa. The seat of the municipality was in Moschochori. It is named after the river Gorgopotamos which flows through the municipal unit (its name means in Greek "the rushing river"). The Oiti mountains, a national park, lie to the southwest. The northeastern part of the municipal unit lies in the wide and flat Spercheios valley. The municipal unit of Gorgopotamos borders Lamia to the north and Phocis to the southwest.

== Subdivisions ==
The municipal unit Gorgopotamos is subdivided into the following communities (constituent villages in brackets):

- Gorgopotamos
- Damasta (Ano Damasta, Kato Damasta, Chalvantzaiika)
- Delfino
- Dyo Vouna
- Eleftherochori
- Irakleia
- Koumaritsi
- Moschochori
- Neo Krikello
- Oiti (Oiti, Skamnos)
- Vardates (Ano Vardates)

The village Gorgopotamos grew around an acetylene plant that operated between 1907 and 1945. The village of Eleftherochori is situated at 800 m above sea level on the slope of Kallidromo. The village of Damasta features the natural spring known as Psoroneri.

== Population ==
Year	Population village	Community population	Municipal unit population
1981	332	-	-
1991	429	-	4,401
2001	443	472	4,510
2011	420	453	3,374
2021	-	380	2,810

== History ==
The Gorgopotamos bridge, built in 1905, put the Gorgopotamos village on the map for the strategic purpose the bridge played during World War II. The Engineer who originally designed and built the infamous Gorgopotamos bridge was Agostino Tacconi, later Αυγουστίνος Τακωνης (Takonis) who migrated from Palermo Italy to Greece to supply Greece with his Engineering skills. At the time Greece was recruiting from other nations to fill a significant skills shortage. The name of Gorgopotamos became famous during World War II, when 150 Greek partisans, following plans drawn by E. C. W. "Eddie" Myers and assisted by a group of British SOE officers, which included C.M. Woodhouse, blew up the railroad bridge over the Gorgopotamos river on November 25, 1942 as part of Operation Harling and cut off the enemy-controlled route between Thessaloniki and Athens. The blast ruined two of the six piers of the bridge. In an act of reprisals, the German occupation forces executed 16 Greek locals. The area around the bridge has been designated a national monument.

After World War II and the Greek Civil War, the bridge of Gorgopotamos was partially rebuilt, the damaged piers being replaced with steel pylons.

== Transport ==
The community is served by Gorgopotamos railway station, with Regional services to Leianokladi and Athens.
