= Osnopolye =

Osnopolye Оснополье
- Village
- Location within Vologda Oblast Location within Russia
- Coordinates: 58°55′N 36°35′E
- Country: Russia
- Region: Vologda Oblast
- District: Ustyuzhensky District
- Time zone: UTC+3:00
- Postal Code in Russia: 162824

Osnopolye (Russian: Оснополье) is a rural locality (a village) in Posyolok imeni Zhelyabovo, Ustyuzhensky District, Vologda Oblast, Russia. The population was 48 as of 2002. There are 5 streets.

== Geography ==
Osnopolye is located 20 km (12 mi) northeast of Ustyuzhna (the district's administrative centre) by road. Lychno is the nearest rural locality.
