= Trachis =

Region and city-state in ancient Greece

Trachis (Ancient Greek: Τραχίς, Trakhís) was a region in ancient Greece. Situated south of the river Spercheios, it was populated by the Malians. It was also a polis (city-state).

Its main town was also called Trachis until 426 BC, when it was refounded as a Spartan colony and became Heraclea Trachinia. It is located to the west of Thermopylae. Trachis is located just west of the westernmost tip of the island of Euboea, north of Delphi. Near this place archaeologists discovered tombs from the Mycenaean period.

According to Greek mythology Trachis was the home of Ceyx and Alcyone. Heracles lived in exile in Trachis after his slaying of Iphitus. The town is mentioned by Homer as one of the cities subject to Achilles. The last reference to Trachis in antiquity is a passing mention of its ruins in Pausanias's Description of Greece.

== Trachis/Heraclea in ancient times ==
In antiquity the settlement was famous for being at the base of the mountain where Heracles is said to have died (Mount Oeta) as well as being the place where the descendants of Heracles settled. During the Greco-Persian wars, the fertile plains of Heraclea saw the landing and encampment of the Persian army as they marched to Thermopylae. Ephialtes, a native of Trachis, betrayed the Greeks for financial gain by revealing a hidden pass that allowed the Persians to wipe the Greek army out. After the Persian defeat, Ephialtes fled the region but was killed a decade later by Athenades, another Trachis native, for reasons apparently unrelated to the betrayal. Despite this, Athenades was rewarded by the Spartans for his death.

The settlement formerly known as "Trachis" was renamed "Heraclea in Trachis" (Heraclea Trachinia) by the Spartans, who sent a garrison in 427 BC to guard the Trachinian plain against the marauding highland tribes of Oeta, and built a citadel close by the Asopus gorge. But their attempted settlement during the Peloponnesian War failed, due to the hostility of the Thessalians. For a short time the Spartans were displaced by the Thebans. After a bloody defeat at the hands of the neighbouring mountaineers in 409, the Spartan governor quarrelled with the native settlers, whom he expelled in 399. Four years later Thebes used her new predominance in central Greece to restore the Trachinians, who retained Heraclea until 371, when the Thessalonian ruler Jason of Pherae seized and dismantled it. The fortress was rebuilt, and after 280 served the Aetolians as a bulwark against Celts and Macedonians. It was captured in 191 by the Romans, but restored to the Aetolian League until 146, after which it fell into obscurity, and Strabo described it as mostly deserted.

== Trachis/Heraclea in modern times ==
During the Greek War of Independence the area was famous for its resistance fighters or klephts, a term which means mountain fighters or bandits, and includes those who opposed the Turkish haraç poll tax upon agricultural commodities. In World War II, the area saw significant resistance to the Germans. A vital railroad bridge linking southern and northern Greece was destroyed here.

Today the village of Heraclea is a thriving agricultural community. Recent excavations have also revealed a series of small tombs at the foothills of Oeta near the banks of the Asopus river.
