= Teutiaplus =

Teutiaplus (Ancient Greek: Τευτίαπλος) was an Elean during the Peloponnesian War. He served under Alcidas in the Peloponnesian fleet during the revolt of Mitylene from Athens in 427 BCE. When the fleet arrived, however, they found that Mitylene had already surrendered to the Athenians. Despite this, Teutiaplus suggested a daring move: he proposed launching a surprise attack on the Athenians, hoping to catch them off guard while they were still complacent after their victory. He believed the Athenians would be vulnerable, especially by sea, where their forces were not expecting any further threats.

However, Alcidas rejected Teutiaplus's plan. Later, as the fleet sailed near Ionia, Teutiaplus again attempted to persuade Alcidas to seize an Ionian city, or even the Aeolic town of Cyme. Teutiaplus argued that this could serve as a stronghold for inciting revolt in the region and cutting off Athens revenue. But once again, Alcidas showed little interest, preferring instead to return to the Peloponnese, having arrived too late to affect the situation in Mitylene.
