= Pungitius hellenicus =

Conservation status
- Endangered (IUCN 3.1)

Scientific classification
- Kingdom: Animalia
- Phylum: Chordata
- Class: Actinopterygii
- Order: Perciformes
- Family: Gasterosteidae
- Genus: Pungitius
- Species: P. hellenicus

Binomial name
- Pungitius hellenicus Stephanidis, 1971

Species of fish

Pungitius hellenicus, the Greek ninespine stickleback or ellinopygósteos, is a species of fish in the family Gasterosteidae. It is endemic to Greece. Its natural habitats are rivers and freshwater spring. It is threatened by habitat loss and considered critically endangered in the International Red List of IUCN, Bern Convention (Appendix III).

== Characteristics ==
A combination of five traits are characteristic of the species: caudal peduncle keel absent, its ectocoracoid reduced, dorsal spines fewer than seven, pelvic girdle absent or vestigial, and large lateral scutes absent. The body is moderately compressed. The head is conical and the interorbital area flattened. Bones are weakly ossified and sculpturing poorly developed on the cranial bones. Mouth slightly supraterminal, oblique, and continuous groove separating upper lip from maxillary. Numerous small sharp teeth confined to upper and lower jaws, absent on roof of mouth. Gill membranes extending forward, broadly joined to each other, and free from isthmus. Gill rakers 7–10. Opercular opening extending above pectoral fin base. Pectoral fin soft rays 10 (rarely 11). Dorsal fin spines 2–6, isolated (with small triangular fin membrane), directed posteriorly and not inclined from middorsal line, and depressible in shallow groove. First dorsal spine shortest and last one longest. Dorsal fin soft rays 8–11. Anal fin with one spine and 6-10 soft rays. Caudal fin with 12 soft rays, rounded, and deeper than wide. Vertebrae 29-30 (usually 30) with 12-13 precaudal vertebrae. Lateral line inconspicuous with 28-38 (usually 32) small round scutes. The longest reported specimens are 50 mm. Background color pale olive, sides of the body pigmented with dark bars or blotches.

== Range ==
This species is confined to three localities in the Spercheios valley in central Greece: the Aghia Paraskevi Spring, 5 km east of Lamia, and an associated system of drainage channels extending over the areas Diplosoudi and Bourdara, a large system of connected drainage and irrigation channels and natural wells extending over the areas Lykochoria and Kaikia near the village of Moschochori, and a small number of natural wells near the village of Kompotades. The species is abundant in some channels of the Lykochoria area, but is moderately abundant or rare in the rest of its range.

== Ecology ==
The typical habitat consists of relatively cool spring or slow-running waters (maximum temperature rarely exceeding 20 °C in summer) with rich vegetation. Specimens inhabit small water bodies and, with its camouflage coloration, exhibit cryptic behavior, remaining among aquatic vegetation during most of the day, and rarely seen in the open areas. In most areas, this species occurs in sympatry with Pelasgus marathonicus, Alburnoides bipunctatus, Gambusia holbrooki, and Gasterosteus aculeatus. Seasonal presence of Squalius and Barbus sp. has been recorded in some wells and localities that communicate with the Sperchios river. Competition for food (both intra- and inter-specific) does not appear to be a critical survival factor. Stomach content analysis of sympatric species has failed to identify predation on P. hellenicus, but some cases of cannibalism are known. Food consists mainly of amphipods, isopods, benthic copepods, bivalves, gastropods, oligochaetes, insects and their larvae, fish larvae, invertebrate eggs, and demersal prey or prey associated with vegetation. Maximum recorded age is 18 months.

== Reproduction ==
Spawning occurs mainly in May and June, with, only one breeding period in their lifetime. During the reproductive period the male acquires breeding coloration, constructs nests from plant material where the female deposits the eggs, and provides care to the eggs until the time they hatch. The morphological and morphometric development of larvae and juveniles is known from both field observations and breeding in aquaria. Larvae hatch at about 5.5 mm SL, exhibit the general morphological characteristics of the family Gasterosteidae, have a well-developed pigmentation pattern and exhibit cryptic behavior. Adult morphology is acquired at about 10–11 mm SL.

== Threats ==
The type locality (a spring in Kombotades village) is destroyed but small populations remain in nearby wells. The status of the species in Aghia Paraskevi Spring is satisfactory. Water removal and summer drought may reduce the area of the spring basins available for this population, but the presence of this species in associated channels reduces the danger of extinction. The population in the system of channels and wells of the Moschohori area is relatively safe. Although individual wells are filled in with earth to increase the cultivation area and the channels are occasionally disturbed for maintenance purposes (excavations, plant cleaning, etc.), the system as a whole is relatively stable. The species seems to be well adapted to small and unstable water systems by means of its life-history strategy (small body size, annual life-cycle, high reproductive effort) which permit an opportunistic response to windows of environmental variability, high probability of survival up to the age of reproduction and high colonization efficiency. Aghia Paraskevi Spring and the species have been granted protection by law No. 67/1981 of the Greek state and official decision of the Phthiotis Prefect.

Much basic ecological information is needed for this species, including habitat requirements, life history and reproduction behavior, and surveys of existing populations. No holotype was designated for this species, but eight syntypes are in the Muséum National d'Histoire Naturelle, Paris (MNHN 1975-0867).

== Sources ==
- Keivany, Y.; J.S. Nelson (1998). "Comparative osteology of the Greek ninespine stickleback, Pungitius hellenicus (Teleostei, Gasterosteidae)". Journal of Ichthyology. 38 (6): 430–440.
- Keivany, Y.; J.S. Nelson (2000). "Taxonomic review of the genus Pungitius, ninespine sticklebacks (Gasterosteidae)". Cybium. 24 (2): 107–122.
- Keivany, Y.; J.S. Nelson; P.S. Economidis (1997). "Validity of Pungitius hellenicus, a stickleback fish from Greece". Copeia. 1997 (3): 558–564. doi:10.2307/1447559. JSTOR 1447559.
- Keivany, Y.; C.K. Daoulas; J.S. Nelson; P.S. Economidis (1999). "Threatened fishes of the world: Pungitius hellenicus Stephanidis, 1971 (Gasterosteidae)". Environmental Biology of Fishes. 55 (4): 390. doi:10.1023/A:1007576913663.
