= Kallidromo =

Mountain in Greece

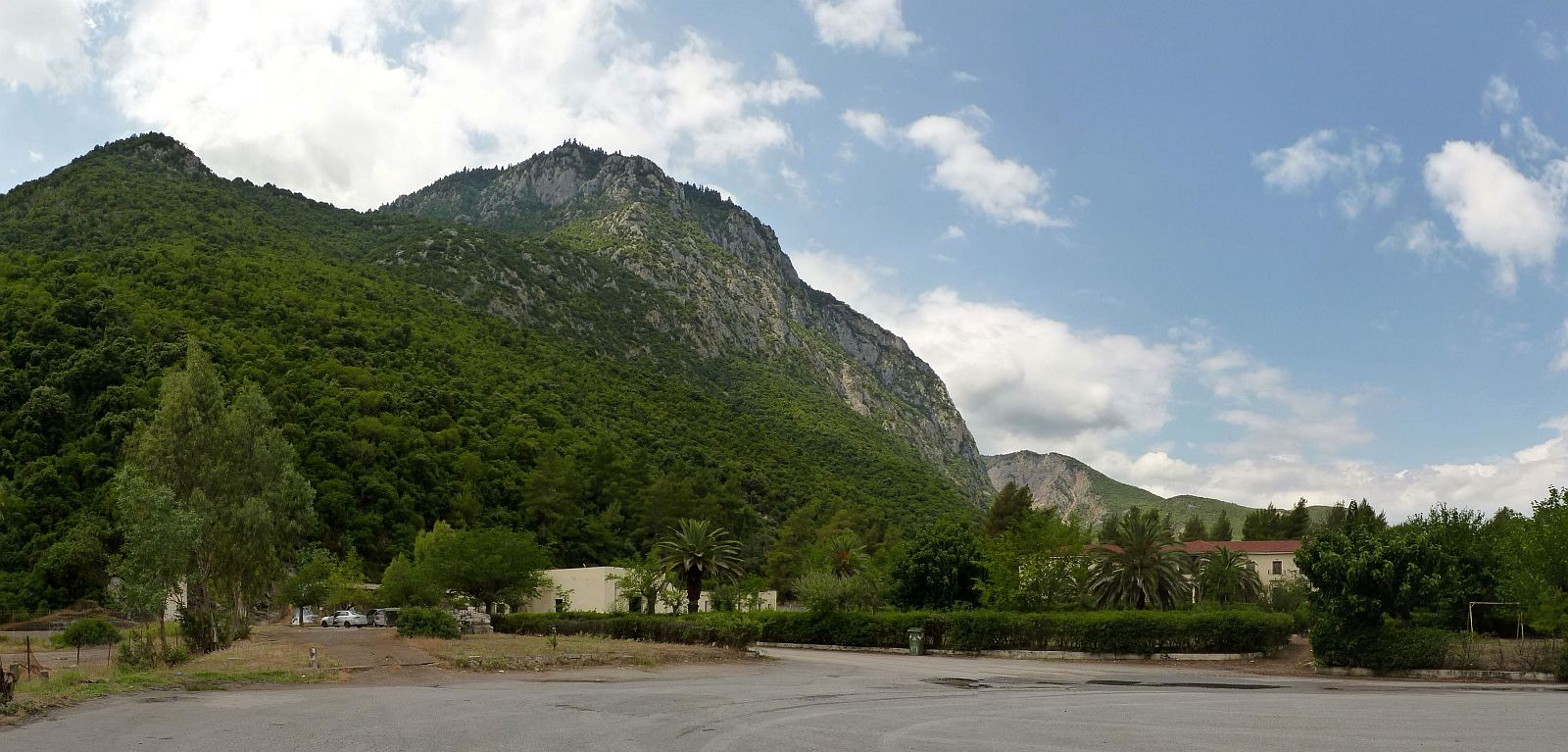
- Kallidromo mountain seen from Thermopylae

Highest point
- Elevation: 1,399 m (4,590 ft)
- Coordinates: 38°44′13″N 22°32′41″E

Naming
- Pronunciation: Greek: [kaˈliðromo]

Geography
- Location: Northern Phocis and southern Phthiotis, Greece

Kallidromo (Greek: Καλλίδρομο) is a mountain in southeastern Phthiotis and northeastern Phocis, in Central Greece. Its maximum elevation is 1,399 m. The Kallidromo lies south of the Malian Gulf, east of Mount Oeta and north of the Cephissus valley. The strategic site of Thermopylae lies north of the mountain. The village of Drymaia is on the mountain. Nearby places are Mendenitsa to the northeast and Amfikleia to the south. The A1 motorway (Athens - Lamia - Thessaloniki) passes north of the mountain. The classic railway from Athens to Lamia and Thessaloniki passes south and west of the mountain, while the newer high-speed line passes through the mountain via a tunnel.

== Kallidromos thermal baths ==
The hot springs of Kallidromos are part of Fthiotida’s thermal spring network. They are located six kilometers from Lamia in Fthiotida and have been a source of healing and tranquility since antiquity, renowned for their therapeutic properties, particularly in treating skin conditions like psoriasis, rheumatism, arthritis, and sciatica. Historically referred to as Psoroneria, these springs, with waters reaching 33°C, are linked to legends involving Athena and Hercules, who received the springs as a gift for their healing powers. Their beneficial effects were noted by ancient historians and physicians, including Herodotus and Hippocrates, while geographer Pausanias praised their remarkably clear and blue waters.
