= Dyo Vouna =

Dyo Vouna Δύο Βουνά
- Community
- Location within Greece
- Coordinates: 38°48.25′N 22°22.84′E
- Country: Greece
- Administrative region: Central Greece
- Regional unit: Phthiotis
- Municipality: Lamia
- Municipal unit: Gorgopotamos

Population (2021)
  - Community: 84
- Time zone: UTC+2 (EET)
  - Summer (DST): UTC+3 (EEST)
- Vehicle registration: ΜΙ

Dyo Vouna (Greek: Δύο Βουνά, meaning "two mountains") is a village on Mount Oeta in Phthiotis, Greece. Since the 2011 local government reform it is part of the municipality of Lamia, and of the municipal unit of Gorgopotamos. Population was 84 in the 2021 census.

It is the birthplace of Yiannis Dyovouniotis, a military leader of the Greek War of Independence.
