= Oiti (village) =

Oiti Οίτη
- Community
- Location within Greece
- Coordinates: 38°44.50′N 22°24′E
- Country: Greece
- Administrative region: Central Greece
- Regional unit: Phthiotis
- Municipality: Lamia
- Municipal unit: Gorgopotamos

Population (2021)
  - Community: 99
- Time zone: UTC+2 (EET)
  - Summer (DST): UTC+3 (EEST)
- Vehicle registration: ΜΙ

Oiti (Greek: Οίτη), formerly Gardikaki (Γαρδικάκι), is a village on Mount Oeta in Phthiotis, Greece. Since the 2011 local government reform it is part of the municipality of Lamia, and of the municipal unit of Gorgopotamos. The nearby settlement of Skamnos also belongs to the community of Oiti. Population for the entire community was 99 in the 2021 census.
