= Pyre of Heracles =

Coordinates: 38°45′07″N 22°17′56″E

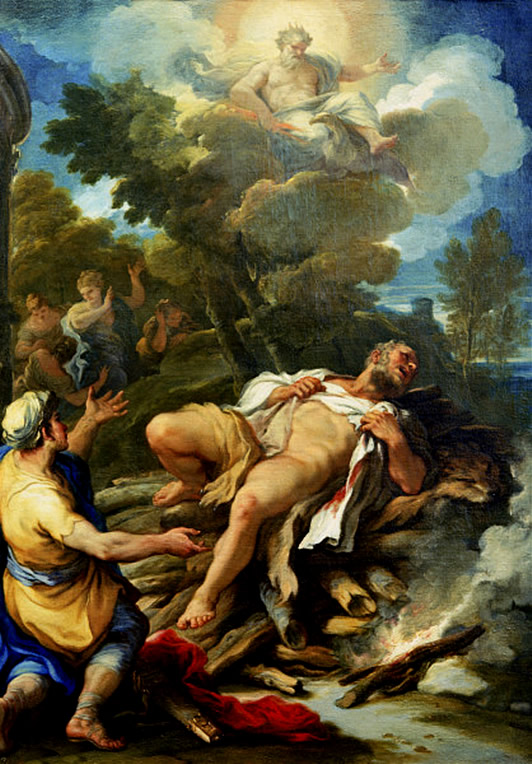
Heracles on his funeral pyre before self-immolation as portrayed in Hercules on the pyre by Luca Giordano.

The pyre of Heracles (Greek: Ἡρακλέους Πυρά) are the ruins of a Doric temple from the 3rd century BCE on Mount Oeta, the site where the ancient Greek mythological hero Heracles self-immolated. The story comes from the Greek tragedy, Trachiniae, which was written by the Ancient Greek tragedy writer, Sophocles.

== The Myth ==
The myth begins with Heracles killing the centaur, Nessus, who fell in love with his wife, Deianeira. Upon his death, Nessus gave Deianeira a poisoned cloak that he claimed was a love charm. Not knowing that the cloak was poisoned, Deianeira gives it to Heracles when she hears of his love for Princess Iole, fearing she will lose his favor. The cloak causes Heracles excruciating pain and begins slowly burning his body. The pain is so extreme that he decides the only way to rid himself of it is to die by self-immolation.

== Ruins ==
The ruins are located in what is now the regional unit of Phocis, Greece, where the nearby village of Pyra has been named after the Greek myth. Roman general Manius Acilius Glabrio visited them in 191 BCE.

The area of the pyre was originally excavated in 1920–1921 by Greek archaeologists with additional excavations resuming in 1988. Scholar Lewis Richard Farnell theorized that the myth could be a result of an ancient Eastern tradition of a deity being reborn through fire. The 1920–1921 excavation resulted in findings that supported his theory, with pottery inscribed with Heracles's name on it and figurines of the hero uncovered. Because of this, Swedish philologist, Martin Nilisson, concluded that the ritual was indeed the origin of the myth.
