= Embatum =

Town of ancient Ionia

Coordinates: 38°15′14″N 26°22′35″E

Embatum or Embaton (Ancient Greek: τὸ Ἔμβατον) was a town of ancient Ionia, in the territory of Erythrae, mentioned by Theopompus in the eighth book of his Hellenica. It appears from Thucydides that it was on the coast.

Its site is located near the modern Agrilya, Asiatic Turkey.
