= Moschochori, Phthiotis =

Moschochori Μοσχοχώρι
- Community
- Location within Greece
- Coordinates: 38°49′38″N 22°26′57″E
- Country: Greece
- Administrative region: Central Greece
- Regional unit: Phthiotis
- Municipality: Lamia
- Municipal unit: Gorgopotamos

Population (2021)
  - Community: 781
- Time zone: UTC+2 (EET)
  - Summer (DST): UTC+3 (EEST)
- Vehicle registration: ΜΙ

Moschochori (Greek: Μοσχοχώρι) is a village in Phthiotis, Greece. Since the 2011 local government reform it is part of the municipality of Lamia, and of the municipal unit of Gorgopotamos. It had a population of 781 in the 2021 census.
