= Vasilika, Boeotia =

Coordinates: 38.571°N 22.784°E

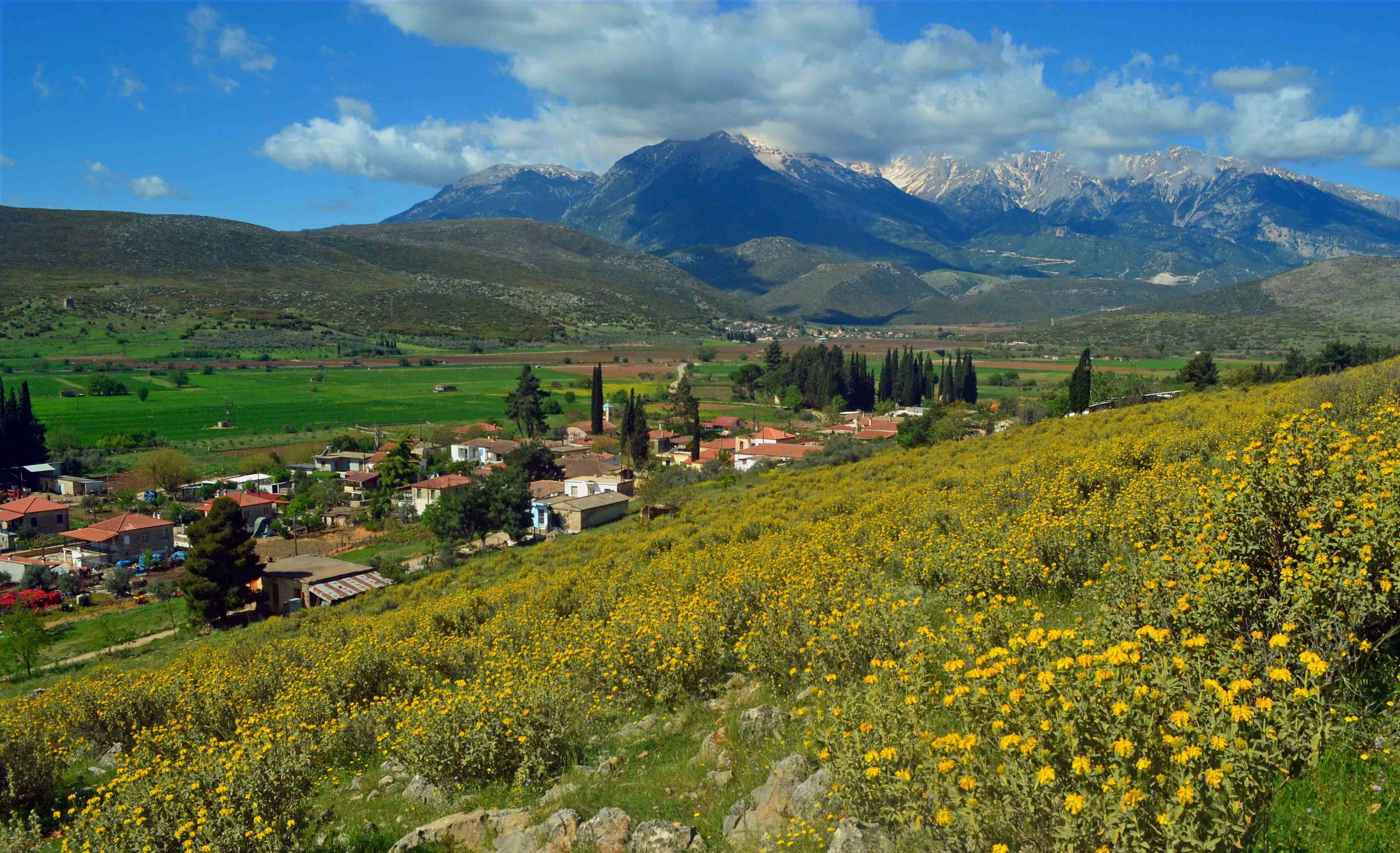
View of Vasilika with Mount Parnassos in the background

Vasilika (Greek: Βασιλικά) is a small village in the prefecture of Boeotia, Greece. It is about 150 kilometers (ca. 90 miles) NW of Athens, and about 25 kilometers (ca. 15 miles) from the prefecture's capital, Livadeia. The village was originally called Kravasaras (Κραβασαράς). References to that name go back to the middle of the 17th century.

Vasilika is built at the foot of the hill of Philoboiotos (Φιλοβοιωτός), where the Roman general Sulla assembled his troops prior to the Battle of Chaeronea, in 86 BC. There, Sulla was victorious against the forces of Taxiles, who was fighting for the King of Pontus Mithridates. To the west, about 400 meters away, scant ruins possibly indicate the temple of Asklepios Archagetes, mentioned by Pausanias. The place is still called "The Columns".

To the east of the village there used to be, until recently, the Inn of Katoikou where, according to Ioannis Makrygiannis, in 1823 during the Greek War of Independence, a small contingent of Greek fighters attacked and captured a Turkish supply caravan.

In more recent times, Vasilika was the site of an anthropological study by Dr. Ernestine Friedl. Along with her classicist husband, Dr. Harry Levy, she lived in the village for a year, in 1955–56. This study was published in 1961, under the title, Vasilika: A Village in Modern Greece.
