= Malian Gulf =

Gulf in the western Aegean Sea

- Maliac Gulf
- Μαλιακός Κόλπος (Greek)
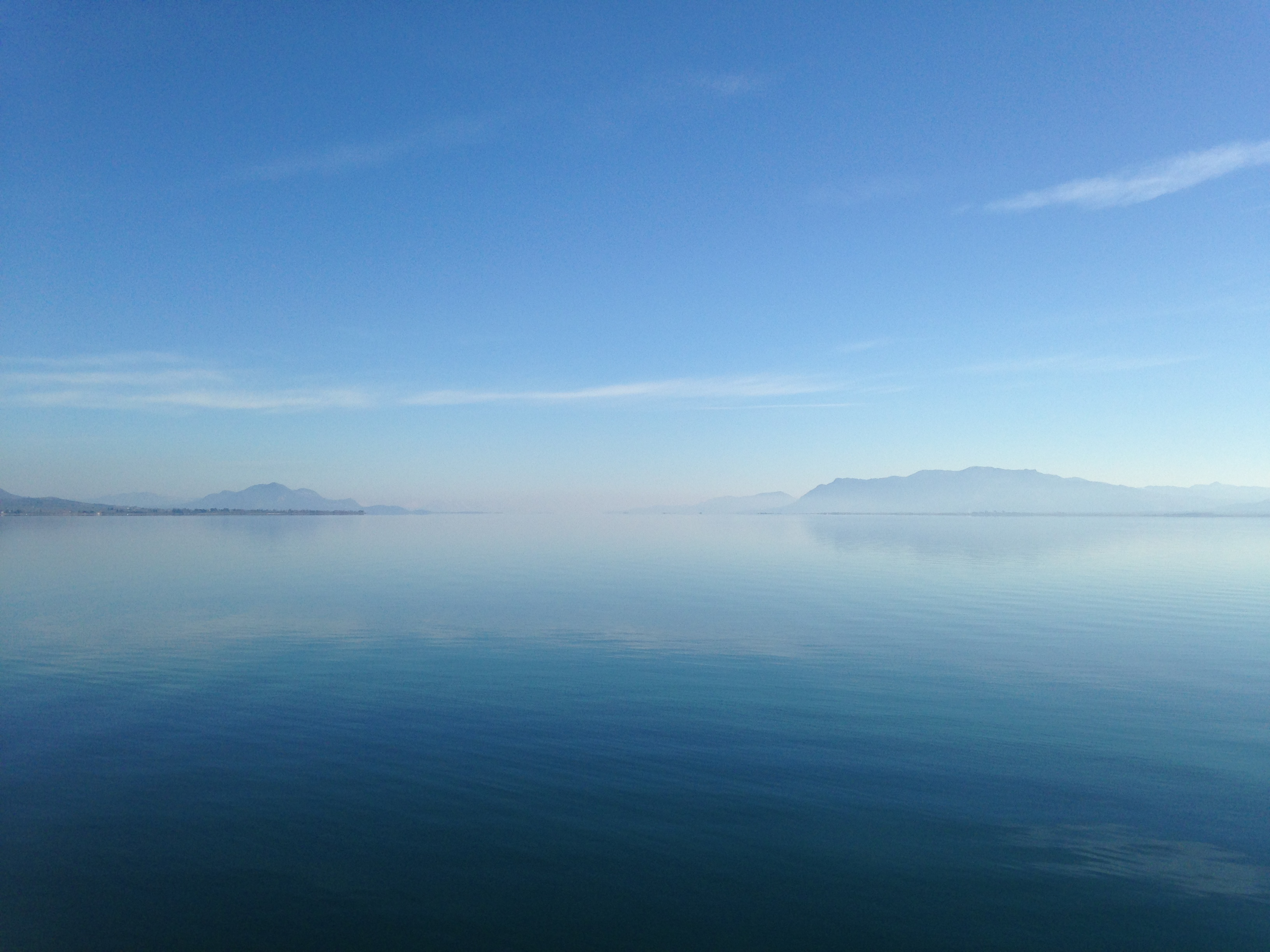

- Location within Greece
- Interactive map of Malian Gulf
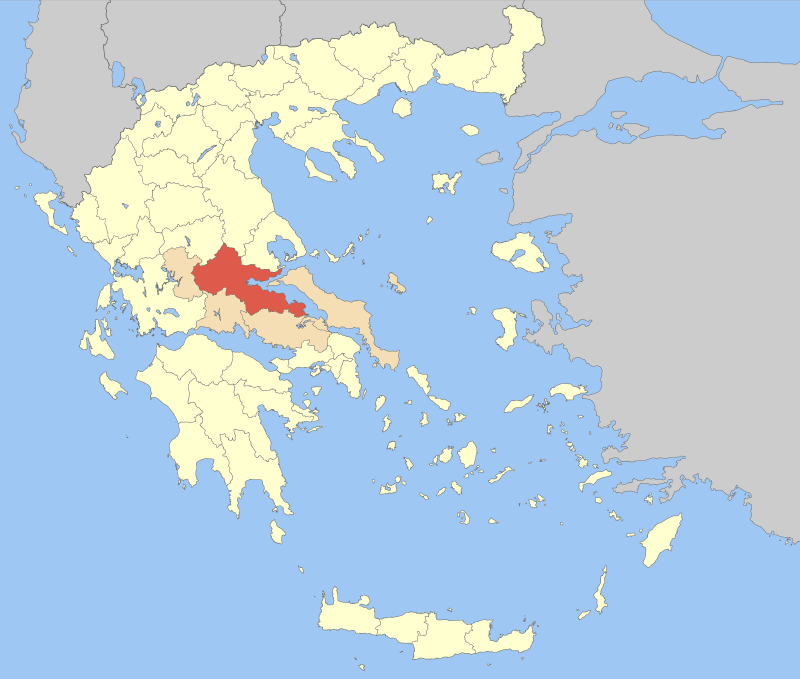
- Map of Greece with the Phthiotis Prefecture, highlighted, which borders the Bay
- Location: Phthiotis
- Coordinates: 38°52′N 22°38′E
- Type: Gulf
- Etymology: Malians, an ancient Greek tribe
- Part of: Aegean Sea
- River sources: Spercheios
- Ocean/sea sources: Steno Artemisiou
- Basin countries: Greece
- Max. width: 15 to 22 kilometers (9.3 to 13.7 mi)
- Max. depth: 27 metres (89 ft)

The Malian or Maliac Gulf (Greek: Μαλιακός Κόλπος, romanized: Maliakós Kólpos) is a gulf in the western Aegean Sea. It forms part of the coastline of Greece's region of Phthiotis. The gulf stretches east to west to a distance of 15 to 22 kilometers (9.3 to 13.7 mi), depending on the definition, and is very shallow, with a maximum depth of 27 meters (89 ft). The only harbour is that of Stylida, which serves the city of Lamia. To its east is Cape Lichada, the northwesternmost point of the island of Euboea.

== Name ==
The gulf is named after the ancient Malians who lived on its shores.

== History ==
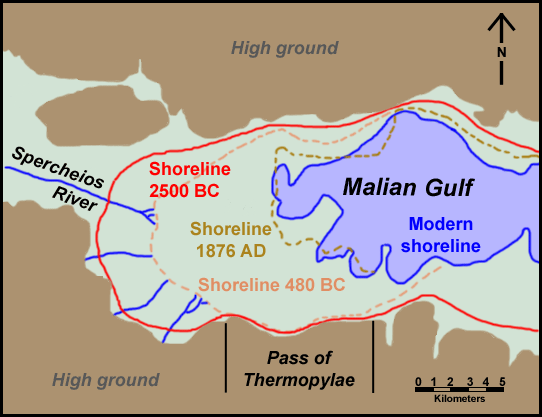
Map of the Malian Gulf shoreline at various times from Antiquity until the present day

Due to the constant accretion of silt from the river the Spercheios and smaller streams, the gulf has been shrinking over the centuries. In the summer of 426 BC, a tsunami hit the gulf between the northwest tip of Euboea and Lamia. The ancient strait of Thermopylae, which at the time the famous battle was fought, was delineated by Mount Kallidromo and the Malian Gulf, has now become a broad coastal plain.

Under the London Protocol of 1830, the line connecting the Malian Gulf and the Aspropotamos River was established as the northern border of the newly independent Greek state.
