= Thermopylae =

Ancient fortified passage in central Greece

Coordinates: 38°48′19″N 22°33′46″E

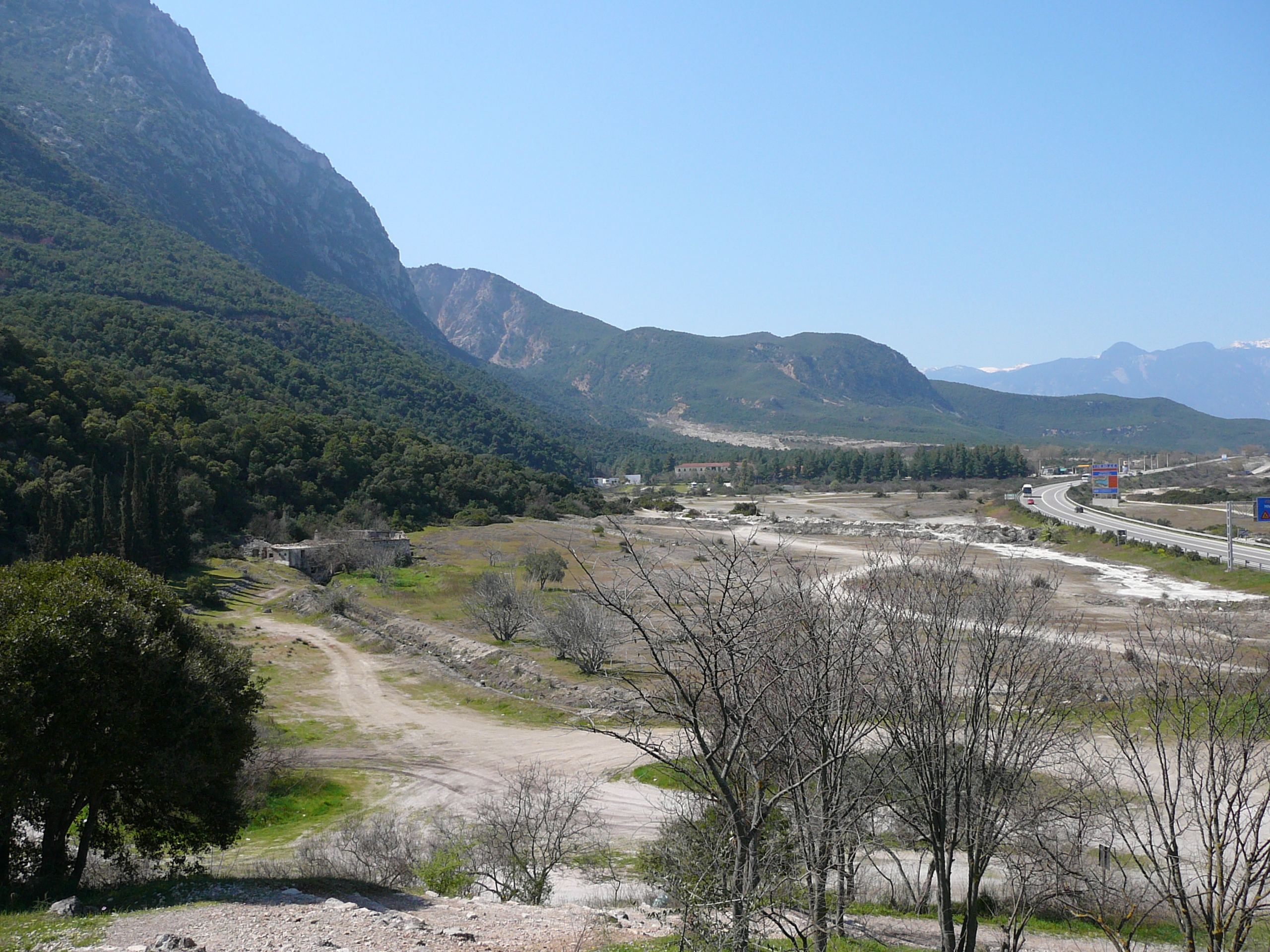
Thermopylae seen from the area of the Phocian Wall. The ancient coast was closer to the mountain, near the road to the right.

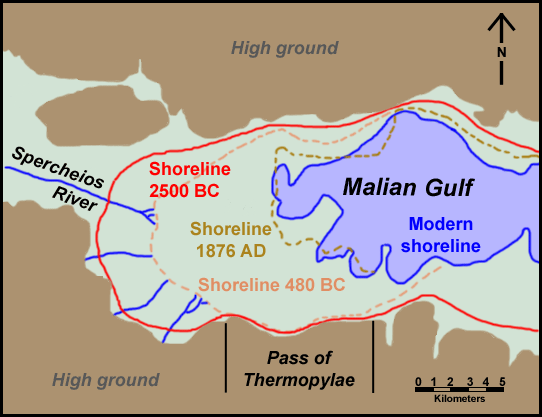
The ancient and modern shorelines

Thermopylae (/θərˈmɒpɪliː/; Ancient Greek and Katharevousa: Θερμοπύλαι, romanized: Thermopylai; Ancient: [tʰermopýlai], Katharevousa: [θermoˈpile̞]; Demotic Greek (Greek): Θερμοπύλες, romanized: Thermopyles [θermoˈpiles]; "hot gates") is a narrow pass and modern town in Lamia, Phthiotis, Greece. It derives its name from its hot sulphur springs. In Greek mythology the Hot Gates is one of the entrances to Hades.

Thermopylae is the site of the Battle of Thermopylae between the Greek forces (including Spartans, Thebans, and Thespians) and the invading Persian forces, commemorated by Simonides of Ceos in the epitaph, "Go tell the Spartans, stranger passing by, That here we lie, having answered our common oaths." Thermopylae is the only land route large enough to bear any significant traffic between Lokris and Thessaly. To go from north to south along the east coast of the Balkans requires use of the pass. In ancient times it was called Malis, named after the Malians (Ancient Greek: Μαλιεῖς), a Greek tribe that lived near present-day Lamia at the delta of the river Spercheios in Greece. The Malian Gulf is also named after them. In the western valley of the Spercheios their land was adjacent to the Aenianes. Their main town was named Trachis. In the town of Anthela, the Malians had an important Temple of Demeter Amphictyonis, an early center of the Anthelan Amphictyony.

The land is dominated by the coastal floodplain of the Spercheios river and is surrounded by sloping forested limestone mountains. There is continuous deposition of sediment from the river and travertine deposits from the hot springs which has substantially altered the landscape during the past few thousand years. The land surface on which the famous Battle of Thermopylae was fought in 480 BC is now buried under 20 metres (66 ft) of soil. The shoreline has also advanced over the centuries because of the sedimentary deposition. The level of the Malian Gulf was also significantly higher during prehistoric times, and the Spercheios River was significantly shorter. Its shoreline advanced by up to 2 kilometers between 2500 BC and 480 BC but has still left several narrow passages between the sea and the mountains. The narrowest point on the plain, where the battle was probably fought, would have been less than 100 metres (330 ft) wide. Between 480 BC and the 21st century, the shoreline advanced by as much as 9 km (5.6 mi) in places, eliminating the narrowest points of the pass and considerably increasing the size of the plain around the outlet of the Spercheios.

The A1 motorway linking Athens and Thessaloniki now follows the ancient shoreline and thus splits the pass; a modern-day monument to King Leonidas I of Sparta is situated on the east side of the highway, directly across the road from the hill where Simonides' epitaph to the fallen is engraved in stone at the top. Thermopylae is part of the "horseshoe of Maliakos", also known as the "horseshoe of death": it is the narrowest part of the highway connecting the north and the south of Greece. It has many turns and has been the site of many vehicular accidents.

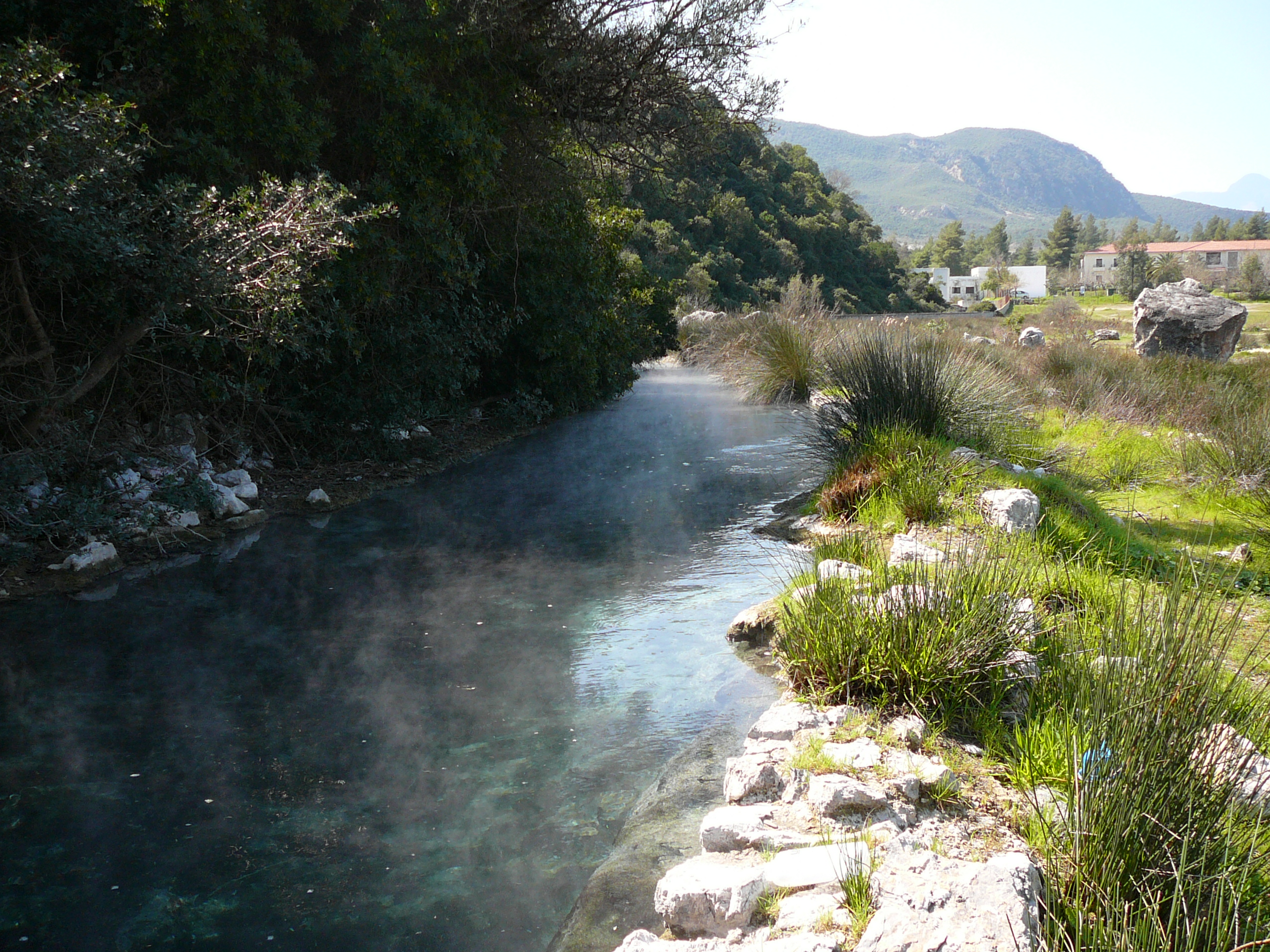
The hot springs from which Thermopylae takes its name

The hot springs from which the pass derives its name still exist close to the foot of the hill.

== Origin ==
Thermopylae means "hot gates", referring to the area's hot sulfur springs. The location was also associated with the cavernous entrance to Hades, the underworld in Greek mythology, which was said to be at Thermopylae. According to one version of the Labours of Heracles, it was said that the waters at Thermopylae became hot because the divine hero Heracles tried to cleanse himself of the Hydra's poison there.

The first known Amphictyony, a group of religiously associated ancient Greek tribes, was centered on the cult of Demeter at the city of Anthela, near Thermopylae. The delegates to this first Amphictyony were dubbed the Pylagorai ("gate-assemblers"); since Demeter had chthonic or underworld associations in many of her older cults, this may be a reference to the gates of Hades.

== Battles ==
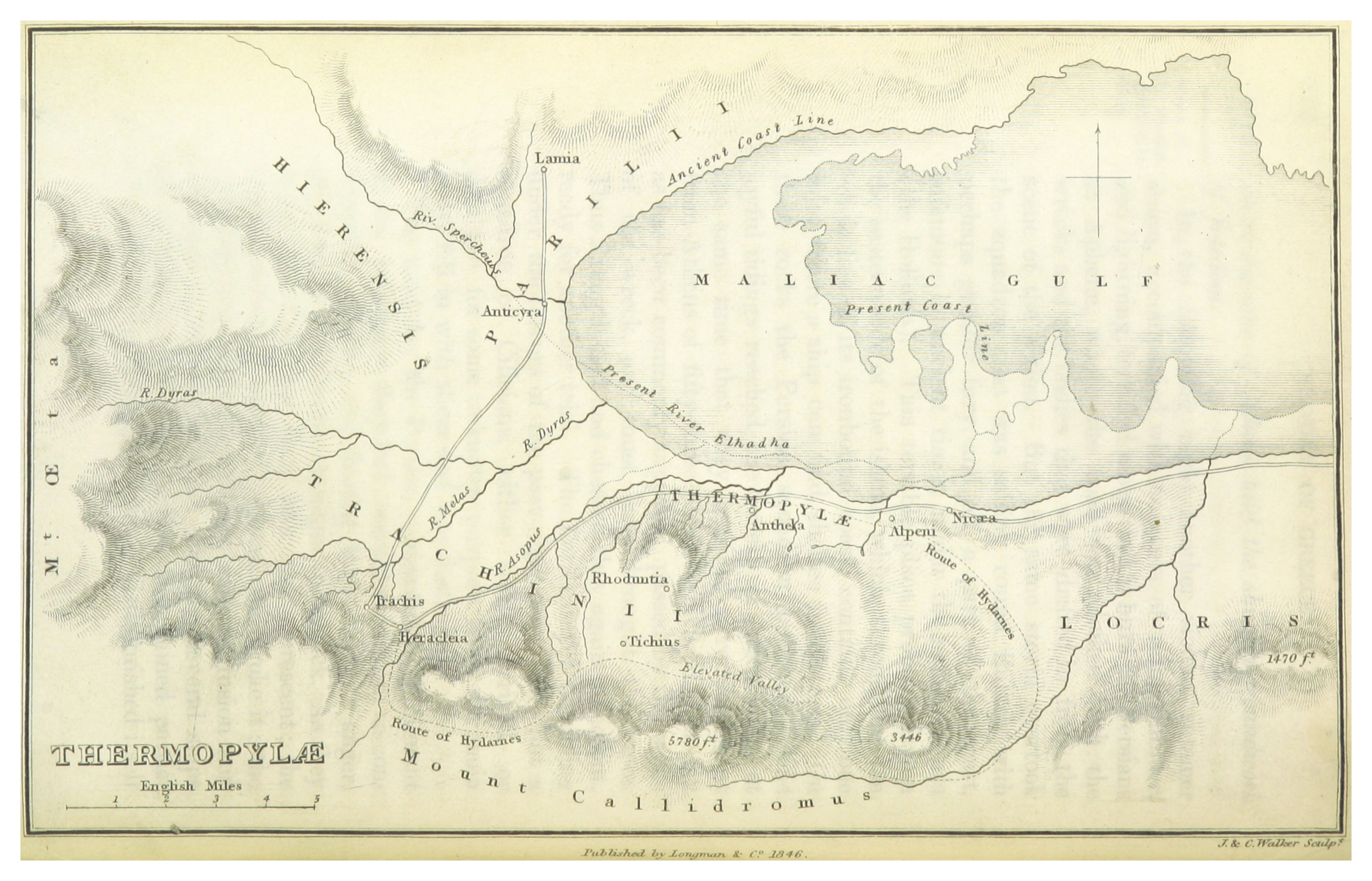
Map of the coast line in the time of Herodotus, and at the time of the map (1876). Thermopylae is between Alpeni and Anthela.

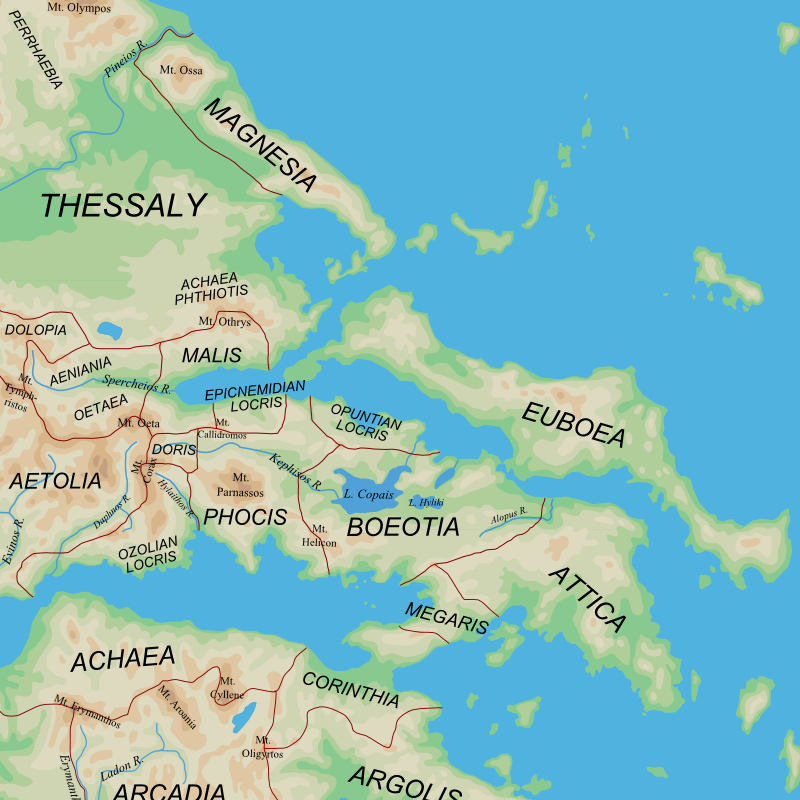
Ancient regions of central Greece

=== Greco-Persian Wars ===
Thermopylae is primarily known for the battle that took place there in 480 BC, in which an outnumbered Greek force probably of 7,000 (including 300 Spartans, 500 warriors from Tegea, 500 from Mantinea, 120 from Arcadian Orchomenos, 1,000 from the rest of Arcadia, 200 from Phlius, 80 from Mycenae, 400 Corinthians, 400 Thebans, 1,000 Phocians, 700 Thespians, and the Opuntian Locrians) held off a substantially larger force of Persians under Xerxes. Over 1,000 Greeks remained in the pass when most of the army retreated: the survivors from previous fighting of 300 Spartans and 700 Thespians, along with 400 Thebans whom the other Greeks forcibly held as hostages. Gaius Stern has argued that this force had already suffered casualties of over 100 in the previous fighting, so the true number might be closer to 1,250 than 1,400.

For three days they held a narrow route between hills and the sea against Xerxes' vast cavalry and infantry force, before being outflanked on the third day via an obscure goat path named the Anopaea Pass. According to the Greek legend, a traitor named Ephialtes of Trachis showed the path to the invaders. The following epitaph by Simonides was written on the monument: "Go tell the Spartans, stranger passing by, that here obedient to their laws we lie." (Ὦ ξεῖν', ἀγγέλλειν Λακεδαιμονίοις ὅτι τῇδε κείμεθα, τοῖς κείνων ῥήμασι πειθόμενοι.)

=== Third Sacred War ===
In 353 BC/352 BC during the Third Sacred War, fought mainly between the forces of the Delphic Amphictyonic League, principally represented by Thebes, and latterly by Philip II of Macedon, and the Phocians. The war was caused by a large fine imposed on the Phocians in 357 BC for cultivating sacred land. The Spartans, who were also fined in that war, actually never fought in it as they were later pardoned.

=== Gallic invasion of the Balkans ===
In 279 BC a Gallic army led by Brennus initially engaged the Aetolians who were forced to make a tactical retreat and who were finally routed by the Thessalians and Malians by the river Spercheios.

=== Roman-Seleucid Wars ===
In 191 BC Antiochus III the Great of Syria attempted in vain to hold the pass against the Romans under Manius Acilius Glabrio.

=== Balkan invasion by the Heruli ===
At an uncertain date in the mid 3rd century AD, the Germanic tribe of Heruli were defeated by a Roman force sent to stop them.

=== Byzantine-Bulgarian Wars ===
In 997, the Bulgarian Tsar Samuel invaded Greece and advanced as far as the Peloponnese. On his return, he was met by a Byzantine army under Nikephoros Ouranos at Spercheios. As the river was flooded, both sides encamped on opposite sides without action. Confident that the Byzantines could not cross the river, the Bulgarians relaxed their guard and were taken by surprise when Byzantine scouts discovered a ford further upriver.

=== Greek War of Independence ===
In 1821, a force of Greek fighters led by Athanasios Diakos made a stand near the pass to stop a force of 8,000 Turks from marching down from Thessaly to put down revolts in Roumeli and the Peloponnese. Diakos, after making a last stand at the bridge of Alamana with 48 of his men, was captured and killed.

=== World War II ===
In 1941 during World War II the ANZAC forces delayed the invading Nazi forces in the area enough to allow the evacuation of the British expeditionary force to Crete. This conflict also became known as the Battle of Thermopylae. The sabotage of the Gorgopotamos bridge in 1942 was referred in German documents of the era as "the recent sabotage near Thermopylae".

== See also ==
- Battle of Thermopylae in popular culture
- Amphictyonic League
