= Lychno =

Lychno Лычно
- Village
- Location within Vologda Oblast Location within Russia
- Coordinates: 58°54′N 36°36′E
- Country: Russia
- Region: Vologda Oblast
- District: Ustyuzhensky District
- Time zone: UTC+3:00

Lychno (Russian: Лычно) is a rural locality (a village) in Posyolok imeni Zhelyabovo, Ustyuzhensky District, Vologda Oblast, Russia. The population was 83 as of 2002. There are 3 streets.

== Geography ==
Lychno is located 18 km (11 mi) northeast of Ustyuzhna (the district's administrative centre) by road. Osnopolye is the nearest rural locality.
