= Operation Harling =

1942 World War II sabotage operation

- Part of Axis occupation of Greece in World War II
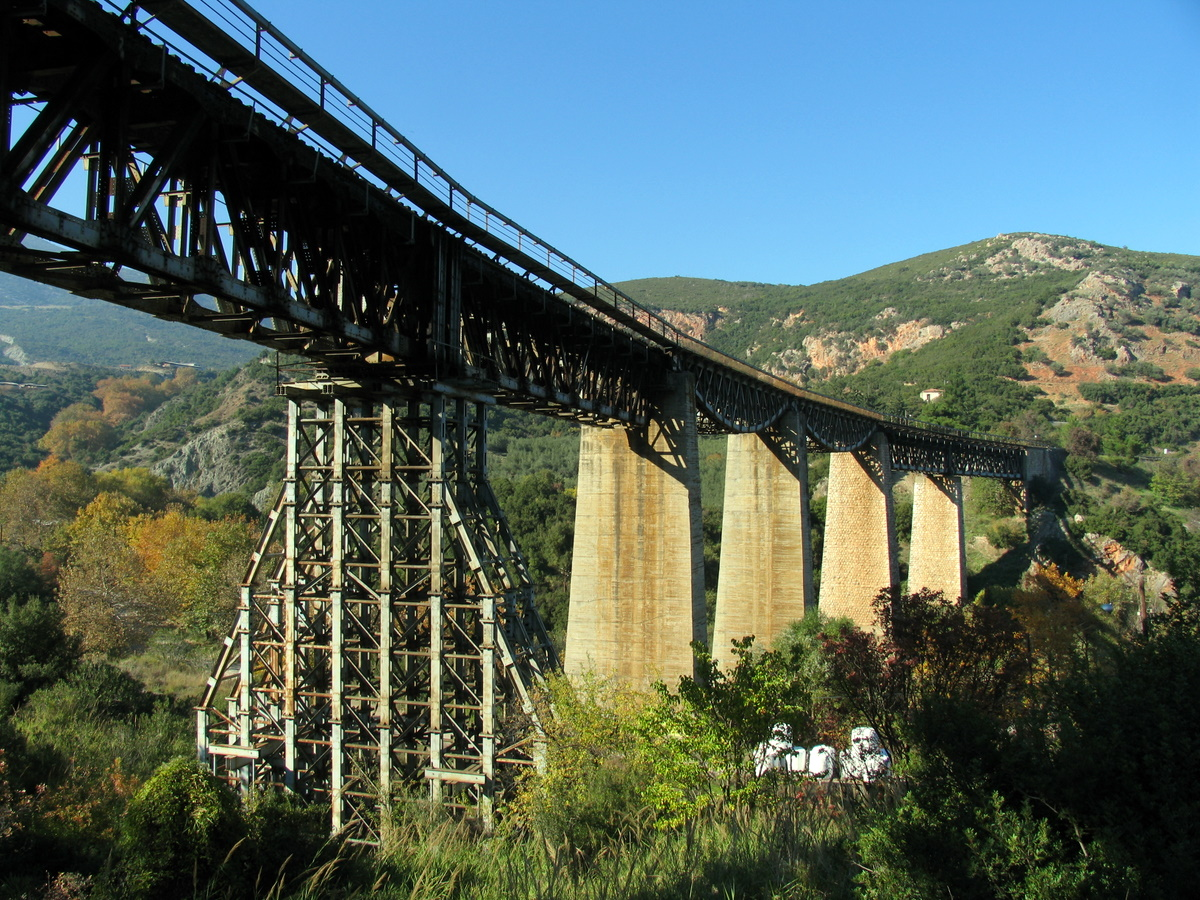
- The modern viaduct over the Gorgopotamos river
Date	25 November 1942
Location	Greece
Result	Allied victory

Belligerents
ELAS; EDES (United Kingdom) SOE	Italy; Germany

Commanders and leaders
(United Kingdom) Eddie Myers (United Kingdom) Chris Woodhouse (United Kingdom) John Cooke; Aris Velouchiotis; Napoleon Zervas	?

Strength
ELAS: 86; EDES: 52 (United Kingdom) 12	(Fascist Italy) 100 (Nazi Germany) 5

Casualties and losses
(United Kingdom) 4 wounded	?

Operation Harling, also known as the Battle of Gorgopotamos (Greek: Μάχη του Γοργοπόταμου) in Greece, was a World War II mission by the British Special Operations Executive (SOE), in cooperation with the Greek Resistance groups EDES and ELAS, which destroyed the heavily guarded Gorgopotamos viaduct in Central Greece on 25 November 1942. This was one of the first major sabotage acts in Axis-occupied Europe, and the beginning of a permanent British involvement with the Greek Resistance.

== Background ==
Operation Harling was conceived in late summer 1942 as an effort to stem the flow of supplies through Greece to the German forces under Field Marshal Erwin Rommel in North Africa. To this end, the Cairo office of the SOE decided to send a sabotage team to cut the railway line connecting Athens with Thessaloniki. Three viaducts were considered as potential targets, all in the Brallos area: the Gorgopotamos, Asopos and Papadia bridges. The destruction of the Asopos viaduct was preferable, since it would take longer to rebuild, but the choice would be ultimately left to the mission's leader. The team would be under the command of Lieutenant Colonel (later brevetted to Brigadier) E. C. W. "Eddie" Myers of the Royal Engineers, "the only parachute-trained professional sapper officer in the Middle East", according to his second-in-command, Major (later brevetted to Colonel) Chris Woodhouse. After completion of the mission, the British team would be evacuated, leaving only Woodhouse, the Greek 2nd Lieutenant Themis Marinos and two radio operators to establish a liaison with the fledgling Greek Resistance movement.

In Greece meanwhile, the first attempts at armed resistance in Macedonia were quelled in the summer of 1941 by the Germans and Bulgarians. The spring and summer of 1942 however saw the birth of the first armed guerrilla units in the mountainous interior of Central Greece and Epirus. From the beginning, the largest among them was the Greek People's Liberation Army (ELAS), founded by the communist-led National Liberation Front (EAM) and headed by Aris Velouchiotis. The second largest were the forces of the National Republican Greek League (EDES), headed by Colonel Napoleon Zervas. The Harling mission's British officers were largely ignorant of the realities on the ground in occupied Greece, or of the precise nature, let alone the strength and political affiliation of the emerging resistance groups.

== The mission ==
=== Landing in Greece, contacting the Resistance ===
The SOE team numbered thirteen men and was divided into three groups, each including a leader, an interpreter, a sapper and a radio operator. The first group was composed of Lt. Colonel Eddie Myers, CO of the mission and group leader, Captain Denys Hamson as interpreter, Captain Tom Barnes (a New Zealander) as the sapper and Sergeants Len Willmott and Frank Hernen as wireless operators. The second group consisted of Maj. Chris Woodhouse, 2nd Lieutenant Themis Marinos (a Greek), Lieutenant Inder Gill (of mixed Scottish and Sikh descent who later became a Lieutenant General in the Indian Army) and Sergeant Doug Phillips. The third group consisted of Major John Cooke, Captain Nat Barker, Captain Arthur Edmonds (a New Zealander) and Sergeant Mike Chittis.

The team was distributed per group to three B-24 Liberator aircraft. A first attempt to drop them over Greece on 28 September failed, as the pre-arranged signal fires had not been lit. During the next flight on 30 September, the fires were located, and the Harling team was dropped near Mount Giona in Central Greece. The third plane was unable to locate any fires, and Major Cooke's group jumped near the heavily garrisoned town of Karpenissi. One group member even landed inside the town itself, and was hidden by local Greeks. Evading the Italian troops searching for them, they made for the hills, where they came upon the guerrillas of Aris Velouchiotis.

In the meantime, the main group was being hidden by the local Greeks and constantly moved around the area to prevent their capture by Italian searching parties, while Woodhouse set out to the town of Amfissa to establish contact with Cairo. During this time, Myers and Hamson, led by a local Greek guide, Yiannis, undertook a reconnaissance of the three prospective targets, and chose Gorgopotamos, which afforded better prospects of success: its garrison of 80 Italians was small enough, and it offered good access, cover and a line of retreat for the attacking force. On 2 November, Woodhouse set out to establish contact with Zervas' men in the Valtos Mountains region, while on 14 November, Major Cooke's team rejoined the main party, with information that they had made contact with Aris. Woodhouse returned on the same day, with Zervas and 45 of his men. From the outset, Zervas was enthusiastic for the mission, but Velouchiotis less so, for the Athens-based leadership of EAM-ELAS still did not appreciate the importance and potential of armed struggle in the countryside, preferring to focus on the cities instead. In the end, Velouchiotis, on his own initiative and contrary to the instructions received from EAM, decided to participate in the operation.

=== The sabotage ===
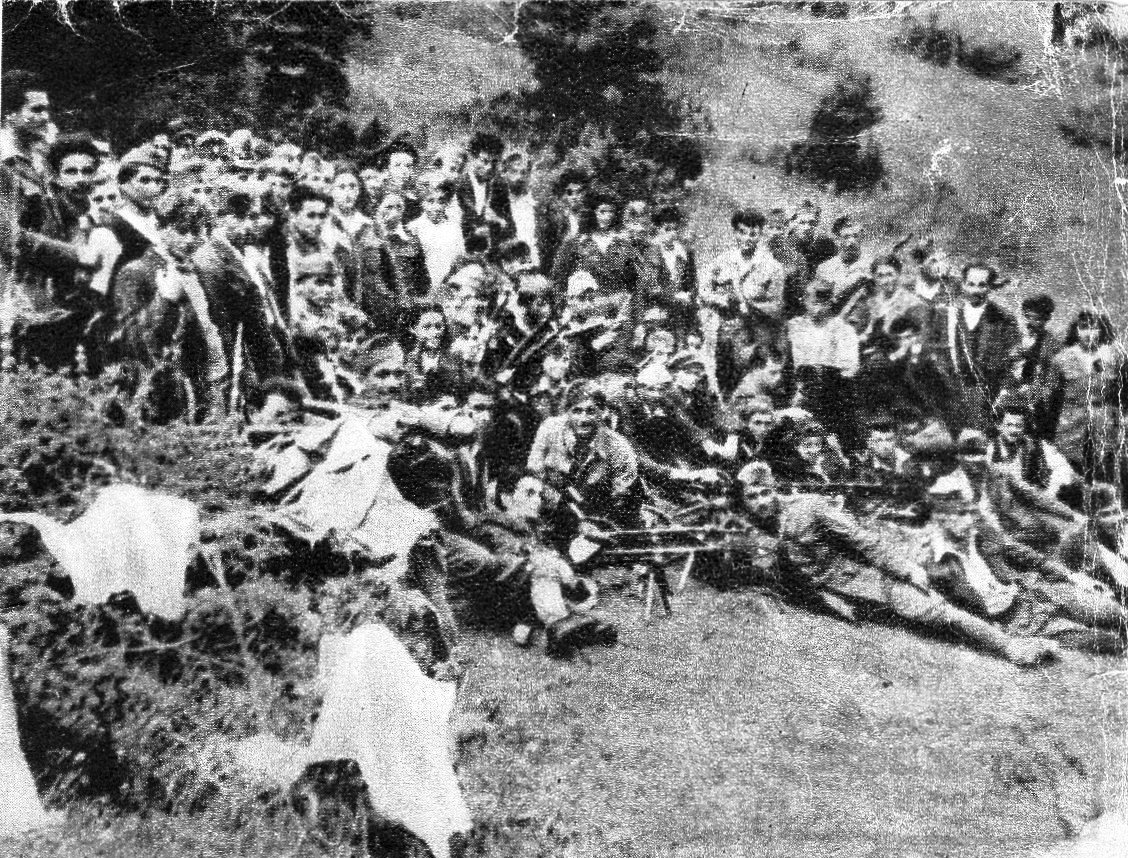
Guerillas of ELAS

The force available for the operation numbered 150 men: the twelve-strong British team, which would form the demolition party, 86 ELAS men and 52 EDES men, who would provide cover and neutralize the garrison. According to the plan, the attack was to take place at 23:00 on 25 November. Two teams of eight guerrillas were to cut the railway and telephone lines in both directions, as well as cover the approaches to the bridge itself, while the main force of 100 guerrillas was to neutralize the garrison (most of them were Italian troops). The demolition party, divided into three teams, would wait upriver until the garrison had been subdued, and then lay the charges.

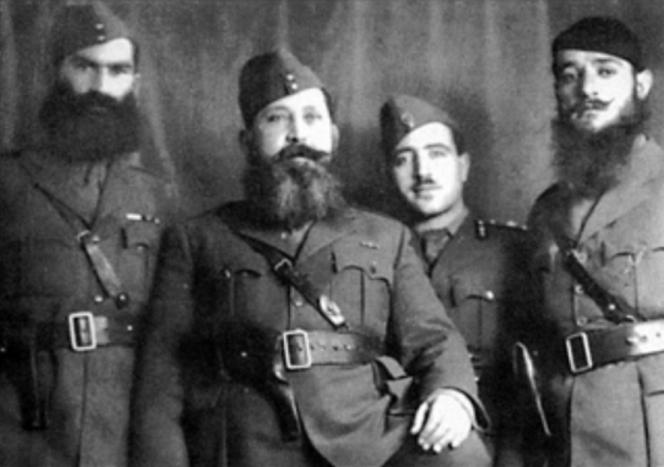
Napoleon Zervas with EDES officers

The attack on the garrison outposts on the two ends of the bridge began as scheduled, but went on far longer than the time originally allotted. Myers took it upon himself to send the demolition teams in while the fight was still under way. The setting of the charges was delayed also, since the girders to be destroyed turned out to be differently shaped than had been anticipated, forcing the British sappers to cut their plastic explosive charges to pieces and then assemble new ones. After the charges were set and the fuses were lit, the first explosion occurred at 01:30, heavily damaging the central pier and collapsing two spans. The British demolition teams then set new explosives to the second pier and the remaining span, which went off at 02:21. In the meantime, the guerrilla outposts had engaged and halted a train with Italian reinforcements heading to the scene. By 04:30, the entire attacking force, which had suffered only four wounded, had successfully disengaged and retreated to its assembly area.

== Aftermath ==
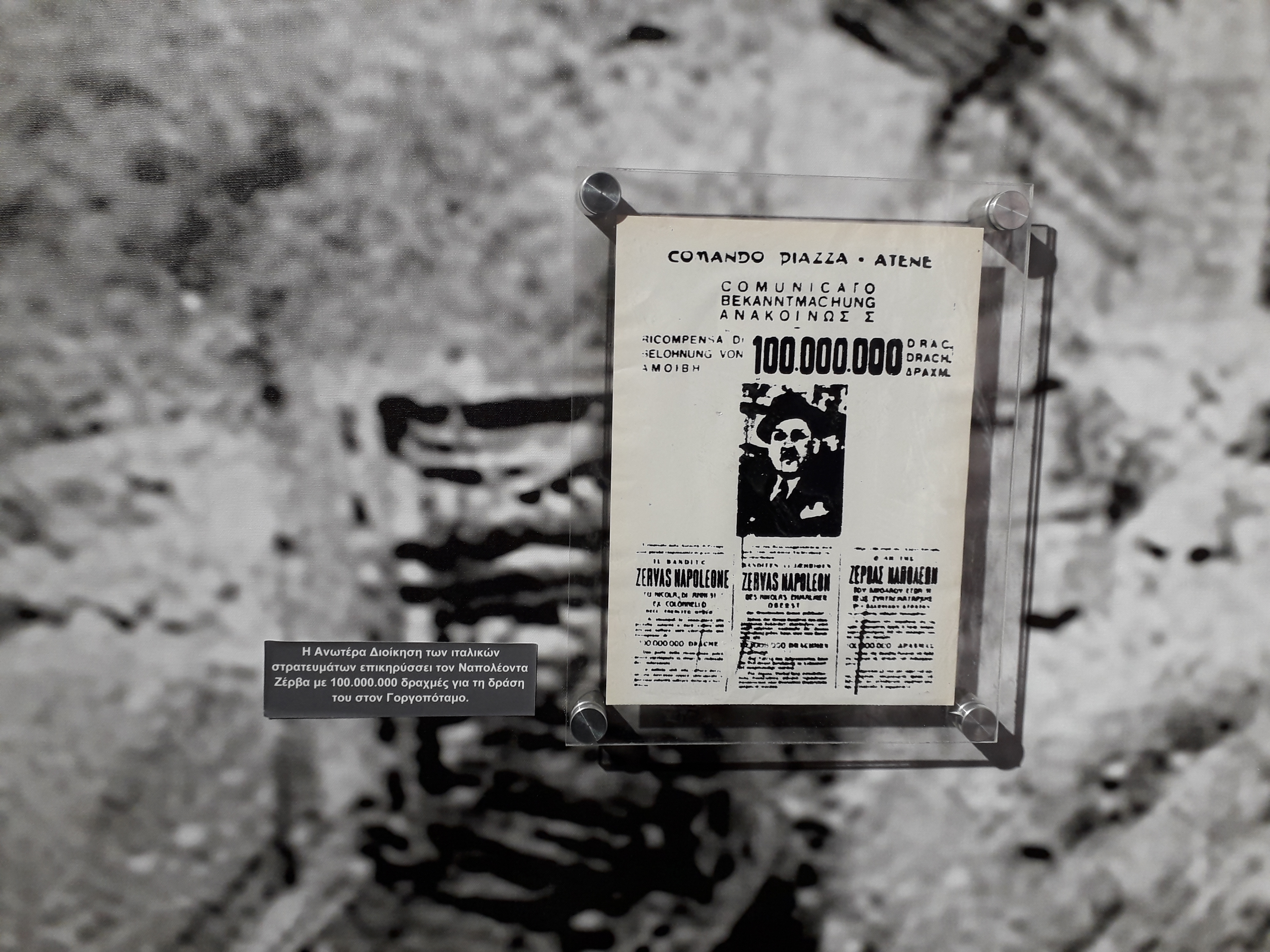
Italian wanted poster for Napoleon Zervas created in the aftermath of the sabotage

The sabotage mission was a major success for SOE, being the biggest such operation carried out until then. Although its original military objective, the disruption of supplies for Rommel's troops, had been rendered obsolete by the Allied victory at El Alamein, it did display the potential for major guerrilla actions in serving Allied strategic objectives, encouraged SOE to aid the development of resistance movements, and provided a major morale boost for occupied Greece. In its aftermath, the Harling mission was not withdrawn, as originally envisaged, but instructed to remain on spot and form the British Military Mission to Greece. Unfortunately for the Greeks however, it was the last time where ELAS and EDES, the country's two major guerrilla forces, would cooperate militarily; within a month, the first clashes between ELAS and EDES forces occurred, a prelude of the open conflict that would erupt between ELAS and the other resistance groups in 1943, and a herald of the Greek Civil War from 1946 to 1949. The bridge itself was repaired in 19 days by the IV Ferrovieri Battalion, of the Royal Italian Army's Ferrovieri Engineer Regiment.

== See also ==
- Operation Washing

== Sources ==
- Clogg, Richard (1986), A Short History of Modern Greece, Cambridge University Press, ISBN 0-521-33804-2
- Hamson, Denys (1946), We Fell Among Greeks, Jonathan Cape
- Howarth, Patrick (1980), Undercover, the men and women of the Special Operations Executive, Routledge, ISBN 978-0-7100-0573-1
- McGlynn, M. B. (1953), "Special Services in Greece", Official History of New Zealand in the Second World War 1939–45 - Episodes & Studies, Volume 2, Wellington: War History Branch, Department Of Internal Affairs
- Myers, E.C.W. (1955), Greek Entanglement, Rupert Hart-Davis
- Papastratis, Prokopis (1984), British policy towards Greece during the Second World War, 1941–1944, Cambridge University Press, ISBN 978-0-521-24342-1
- Woodhouse, Christopher Montague (2002), The struggle for Greece, 1941–1949, C. Hurst & Co. Publishers, ISBN 978-1-85065-487-2
