= Koumaritsi =

Koumaritsi Koυμαρίτσι
- Community
- Location within Greece
- Coordinates: 38°46.20′N 22°22.30′E
- Country: Greece
- Administrative region: Central Greece
- Regional unit: Phthiotis
- Municipality: Lamia
- Municipal unit: Gorgopotamos

Population (2021)
  - Community: 64
- Time zone: UTC+2 (EET)
  - Summer (DST): UTC+3 (EEST)
- Vehicle registration: ΜΙ

Koumaritsi (Greek: Κουμαρίτσι) is a village on Mount Oeta in Phthiotis, Greece. Since the 2011 local government reform it is part of the municipality of Lamia, and of the municipal unit of Gorgopotamos. Population was 64 in the 2021 census.
