= Malians (Greek tribe) =

Greek tribe that resided at the mouth of the river Spercheios

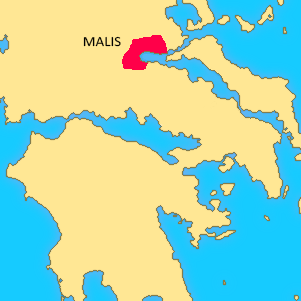
The location of Malis, present-day Phthiotis

The Malians (Ancient Greek: Μαλιεῖς, Malieis) were a Greek tribe that resided at the mouth of the river Spercheios in Greece. The Malian Gulf is named after them. In the western valley of the Spercheios, their land was adjacent to the Aenianes. Their main town was Trachis. In the town of Anthele, the Malians had an important temple of Demeter; an early centre of the Delphinian Amphictiony. According to Herodotus, the Malian Ephialtes of Trachis betrayed the Spartans and their allies in the Battle of Thermopylae, helping the Persians surround the Greek army. In 426 BCE, the Malians asked Sparta for help in their war against the Oetaeans. The Spartans then founded the town Heraclea Trachis in place of Trachis.

In the following decades, the Malians were under the hegemony of Sparta, until they revolted against it in the Corinthian War. In this war, they lost their land south of the Spercheios, Herakleia Trachis was given to the Oitaians, and Lamia, the capital of the present-day regional unit of Phthiotis, became the new capital of the Malians.

Together with the Oitaians and the Ainians, the Malians became members of the Corinthian League, and in 235 BCE, the Aetolian League. In 189 BCE, they became part of Achaea Phthiotis, and since that time the Malians were regarded as Thessalians.
