= Dodona (disambiguation) =

Dodona is a location in Greece, known for its oracle.

Dodona may also refer to:

- Dodona (Thessaly), a city in ancient Thessaly, Greece
- Dodona (butterfly), a genus of butterflies in the family Riodinidae
- 382 Dodona, an asteroid
- Dodona (see), a titular see of the Catholic Church
- Dodona Theatre, in Pristina, Kosovo
- Dodona Manor, the historic home of George Marshall in Leesburg, Virginia, USA

== See also ==
- Dodoma
- Dodon (disambiguation)
- Dodone (disambiguation)
