= Diocese of Vonitsa =

The former residential episcopal see of Bonitza, centred on a town in the Roman province of Epirus Vetus, is now a titular see of the Catholic Church. The town that was the centre of the diocese is now called Vonitsa (Greek: Βόνιτσα). It is unknown when the residential bishopric disappeared.

== Description ==
Louis Petit, writing for the 1907 Catholic Encyclopedia, said that the name "Bodone", by which the titular see was then known, was a dialect variation of "Dodone", the French form of the name "Dodona". He identified the titular see with the former residential see of Dodona and gave information on early Bishops of Dodona. Confusing matters further, there were two cities in Greece named "Dodona", the one in Epirus, noted above, and another one in Thessaly, which Stephanus of Byzantium writes was also called Bodona (Βωδώνη).

The Annuario Pontificio treats the titular sees of Bonitza and Dodona as distinct.

John, Bishop of Bonditza, signed a synodal act in 1229 (P.G., CXIX, 797).

The "Nova Tactica" (Georgius Cyprius ed. Heinrich Gelzer, 1661) has "Mounditza", but this, Petit says, is an evident mistake for "Bounditza", a form derived from "Bodone" (Gustav Parthey, Notitiae episcopatuum., App. 48). In fact the later "Notitiae" wrote only Bounditza (ibid., III, 524), or Bonditza (ibid., X, 616; XIII, 467). Petit gave the contemporary place name as "Bonitza", the form now given in the Annuario Pontificio, along with the Italian form "Bonizza".

The Roman Curia used for a long time the form "Bodona" (adjectival form: "Bodonensis"), and a decree of 1894 directed this name to be suppressed at the death of its titular.
