= Dodone =

Dodone can refer to

- An alternate spelling of the ancient city of Dodona, in Epiris in northwestern Greece, where the oldest oracle of Zeus was located.
- Dodone (mythology), an Oceanid nymph in Greek mythology, said to be the eponym of the ancient city of Dodona

== See also ==
- Dodon (disambiguation)
- Dodona (disambiguation)
