= San Sosti Axe-Head =

6th-century BC Greek axe head

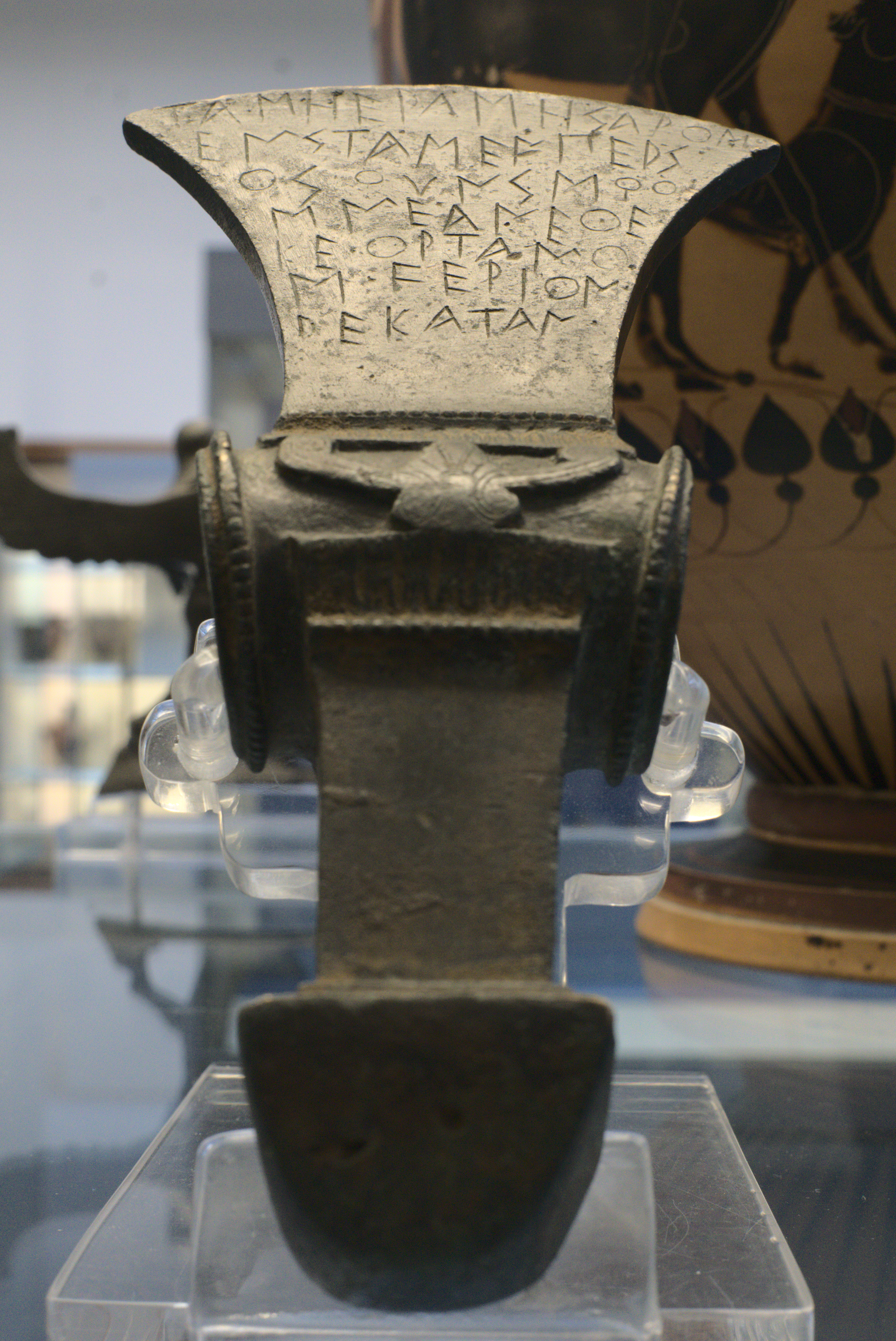
- San Sosti Axe-Head on display in the British Museum
- Material: Bronze
- Size: 16.5 cm high, 0.85 kg in weight
- Writing: Ancient Greek
- Created: 520 BC
- Discovered: 1846
- Present location: British Museum, London
- Registration: GR 1884.6-14.1 (Bronze 252)

The San Sosti Axe-Head is an ancient bronze head of an axe that was originally found near the town of San Sosti, in the province of Cosenza in Calabria, southern Italy. Based on its Ancient Greek inscription, it is now considered to be an elaborately crafted votive offering to the gods.

== Provenance ==
The axe-head was discovered near San Sosti, Calabria in 1846. It was probably made in Sybaris nearby, which had a long history of producing luxury items for affluent clientele. After being uncovered, this ornate object was later bought by the collector and goldsmith Alessandro Castellani, from whom it was eventually acquired by the British Museum in 1884.

== Description ==
The cast bronze wedge-shaped axe-head is elaborately decorated with what seems to be a winged sphinx on the front as well as palmettes and volutes. On the blade of the axe is inscribed an important dedication in the Achaean dialect of Ancient Greek that can be dated to the sixth century BC, which translates as:

I am the sacred property of Hera-in-the-Plain: Kyniskos the butcher dedicated me, a tithe from his works.

Scholars have been unable to determine the location of Hera-in-the Plain, although the inscription clearly indicates the wealth and aspirations of its dedicator.
