= Aeolians =

Ancient Greek tribe

The Aeolians (/iːˈoʊliənz/; Greek: Αἰολεῖς, Aioleis) were one of the four major tribes into which Greeks divided themselves in the ancient period (along with the Achaeans, Dorians and Ionians). They originated in the eastern parts of the Greek mainland, notably in Thessaly and Boeotia. By c. 1100 BC, the Aeolians began their early settlements on the west coast of Anatolia, known as Aeolis, comprising the territory between Troas and Ionia, as well as on the Aegean islands of Lesbos and Tenedos. A second round of Aeolian settlements took place during the 7th century. They spoke Aeolic, a dialect of Ancient Greek most famously known for its use by poets like Sappho and Alcaeus from Lesbos, and Corinna from Boeotia.

== History ==
The name derives from Aeolus, the mythical ancestor of the Aeolians and son of Hellen, himself the mythical patriarch of the Greek nation. The name Aeolian (lit. 'of the wind') derives from the Greek name Aeolus, aiolos (αίολος) literally meaning "changeable", "quickly moving". They spoke an Ancient Greek dialect that is referred to as Aeolic. According to Herodotus, it was said that the Aeolians were previously called Pelasgians.

Originating in Thessaly, a part of which was called Aeolia, the Aeolians often appear as the most numerous amongst the other Hellenic tribes of early times. The Boeotians, a subgroup of the Aeolians, were driven from Thessaly by the Thessalians and moved their location to Boeotia. Aeolian peoples were spread in many other parts of Greece such as Aetolia, Locris, Corinth, Elis and Messinia. During the Dorian invasion, Aeolians from Thessaly fled across the Aegean Sea to the island of Lesbos and the region of Aeolis, called as such after them, in Asia Minor.

== See also ==
- Achaeans
- Dorians
- Ionians

== Sources ==
- Hard, Robin (2004). The Routledge Handbook of Greek Mythology. London and New York: Routledge (Taylor & Francis Group). ISBN 0-415-18636-6.
- Smith, William (1856). Dictionary of Greek and Roman Geography. London: Walter and Maberly.
- Wilson, Nigel (2013). "Aeolians". Encyclopedia of Ancient Greece. Taylor & Francis. ISBN 9781136788000.
