= 382 Dodona =

Main-belt asteroid

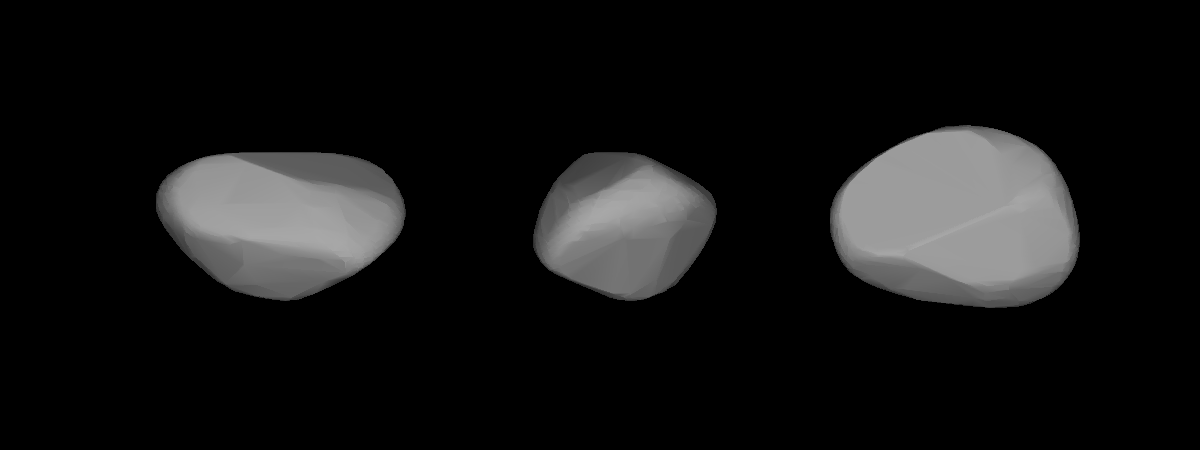
- A three-dimensional model of 382 Dodona based on its light curve

Discovery
- Discovered by: Auguste Charlois
- Discovery date: 29 January 1894

Designations
- Pronunciation: /dəˈdoʊnə/
- Named after: Dodona
- Alternative designations: 1894 AT
- Minor planet category: Main belt

Orbital characteristics
- Epoch 31 July 2016 (JD 2457600.5)
- Uncertainty parameter 0
- Observation arc: 122.21 yr (44636 d)
- Aphelion: 3.6577 AU (547.18 Gm)
- Perihelion: 2.58301 AU (386.413 Gm)
- Semi-major axis: 3.1204 AU (466.81 Gm)
- Eccentricity: 0.17221
- Orbital period (sidereal): 5.51 yr (2013.3 d)
- Mean anomaly: 6.32892°
- Mean motion: 0° 10^{m} 43.716^{s} / day
- Inclination: 7.3928°
- Longitude of ascending node: 313.511°
- Argument of perihelion: 270.036°

Physical characteristics
- Dimensions: 58.37±2.8 km 58.37 km
- Synodic rotation period: 4.113 h (0.1714 d)
- Geometric albedo: 0.1610±0.017; 0.161
- Spectral type: M
- Absolute magnitude (H): 8.77

382 Dodona is a large Main belt asteroid that was discovered by the French astronomer Auguste Charlois on 29 January 1894 in Nice. It is classified as an M-type asteroid.

Measurements of the thermal inertia of 115 Thyra give an estimated range of 15–150 J m^{−2} K^{−1} s^{−1/2}, compared to 50 for lunar regolith and 400 for coarse sand in an atmosphere.
