= Graecians =

Ancient Hellenic tribe

The Graecians (/ˈɡriːʃənz/; also Graei and Graeci; Ancient Greek: Γραῖοι, Graȋoi and Γραικοί, Graikoí) were an ancient Hellenic tribe. Their name is the origin of the Latin (and English) name of the Greeks as a whole.

== Etymology ==
It is possible that their name is derived from the toponym of Graea (Γραία), a city in Boeotia identical with Tanagra according to Pausanias. The word means "old" based on the adjective γραῖα "old (feminine)".

== History ==
According to the historian Georg Busolt, the Graecians were among the first to colonize Italy (i.e., Magna Graecia) in the 9th century BC when they established the city of Cumae; they were the first Greeks with whom the Latins came into contact, which then made them adopt the name of Graeci by synecdoche as the name of the Hellenes. Aristotle (4th-century BC) records that during the deluge of Deucalion, the Graecians were the inhabitants of Hellas (i.e., "the country about Dodona and the Achelous [river]") who were also known as Hellenes. In the Parian Chronicle, the Hellenes were originally called Graecians and established the Panathenean Games in 1522–1521 BC.

== Eponymous ancestor ==
Hesiod stated that the eponymous ancestor of the Graecians was Graecus (Γραικός), the son of Deucalion's daughter Pandora, who also had a brother, Latinus. Other sources have Graecus as the son of Thessalus.

== See also ==
- List of ancient Greek tribes
