= Dodon =

Dodon may refer to

- Dodon (farm), a farm and former tobacco plantation in Maryland, U.S.
- Dodon, Kyrgyzstan, a village in Kyrgyzstan
- L'Isle-en-Dodon, a commune in France
- Lac Dodon, an iron meteorite discovered in Canada
- Igor Dodon (born 1975), President of Moldova
- Galina Dodon (born 1977), First Lady of Moldova

== See also ==
- Dodona (disambiguation)
- Dodone (disambiguation)
