= Selloi =

Ancient Greek tribe in Epirus

The Selloi (Greek: Σελλοί) were an ancient Greek tribe inhabiting Epirus in ancient Greece, in a region between Dodona—site of the oldest reported oracle—and the Achelous river; Aristotle named the area ancient Hellas. A group who were formerly called Graecians and later Hellenes lived there as well. According to Homer, they were priests of the Dodonian Zeus. Classicist and linguist Steve Reece has traced the Homeric name Selloi Σελλοί back to a historical tribe named Helloi Ἑλλοί (related to Hellas, Hellenes, etc). During the oral period of epic transmission one of Homer's bardic predecessors misheard a formulaic expression in which the name was embedded and metanalyzed "Helloi" as "Selloi."

== See also ==
- Greeks (names)
- Names of the Greeks
