= Aethices =

Ancient non-Greek Tribe

The Aethices (Ancient Greek: Αἰθικία) were an ancient non-Greek tribe related to the Epirotes, who lived by robbery, are placed by Strabo on the Thessalian side of Pindus. They are mentioned by Homer, who relates that the Centaurs, expelled by Peirithous from Mount Pelion, took refuge among the Aethices.
