= Diocese of Dodona =

Ancient diocese in the Balkans (fl. 5th–6th centuries)

The diocese of Dodona was an episcopal see in the Roman province of Epirus Vetus in Late Antiquity (fl. 5th–6th centuries). The diocese disappeared during the Slavic invasions. In the 9th century, a new diocese of Vonitsa, taking its name from one of the Slavic tribes, appeared. Although the 1907 Catholic Encyclopedia recognized Vonitsa (then called Bodone) as the same diocese as Dodona, the Annuario Pontificio treats Vonitsa (Bonitza) and Dodona as distinct titular sees in the Catholic Church.

At some date a Christian church was built on the site of the temple of Zeus at Dodona. There are records of some early bishops of Dodona:

- Theodorus was present at the First Council of Ephesus in 431;
- Philotheus appeared at the Council of Chalcedon in 451;
- Uranius signed the letter of the bishops of Epirus Vetus to Emperor Leo I the Thracian in 458;
- Philippus subscribed a synodal report of the bishops of Epirus to Pope Hormisdas concerning the election of John to the metropolitan see of Nicopolis in 516.
