= Dodona (Thessaly) =

City of Perrhaebia in ancient Thessaly

Dodona (Ancient Greek: Δωδώνη) was a city of Perrhaebia in ancient Thessaly, situated near Scotussa. There is a more famous Dodona in Epirus, the site of a famous oracle of Zeus. The ancients wrote that there were two places of the name of Dodona, one in Thessaly, in the district of Perrhaebia near Mount Olympus, and the other (the Thesprotian Dodona) in Epirus in the district of Thesprotia.

The Thessalian Dodona is mentioned in the Catalogue of Ships in the Homer's Iliad along with Cyphus, Gonnos, and the "banks of the Titarisios", all ruled by Guneus, and belonging to the Enienes and Peraebi. These places and ethnic groups are all located in ancient Thessaly, not Epirus; and thus, there can be no doubt, that this passage in Homer refers to the Dodona in Thessaly. However, the other Dodona, and its oracle which Odysseus consulted, is mentioned by Homer in the Odyssey.

There is another mention by Homer in the Iliad of Dodona, with a difference of opinion concerning which Dodona is meant; some supposing that Achilles prayed to Zeus in the Thessalian Dodona as the patron god of his native country; but others maintaining that the mention of Selli, whose name elsewhere occurs in connection with the Thesprotian Dodona, points to the place in Epirus. As there is no evidence of the existence of an oracle at the Thessalian Dodona, it is probable that the prayer of Achilles was directed to the god in Epirus, whose oracle had already acquired great celebrity, as we see from the passage in the Odyssey. The Thessalian Dodona is said to have been also called Bodona (Βωδώνη); and from this place the Thesprotian Dodona is said to have received a colony and its name.
