= Theatres in Pristina =

Pristina has only 3 active theatres National Theatre of Kosova, ODA Theatre and DODONA Theatre. They give live performances every week. There are 21 well-known Kosovan actors employed. They are located in the heart of Pristina. National Theatre (Teatri Kombetar) is placed in the middle downtown of the city, near the main government building. ODA Theatre (Teatri ODA) is placed in the Youth Centre Building, and Dodona Theatre (Teatri Dodona) is placed in Vellusha district, which is near Ibrahim Rugova Square.

== National Theatre of Kosova ==
(42.662°N 21.163°E)

=== History of the theatre ===
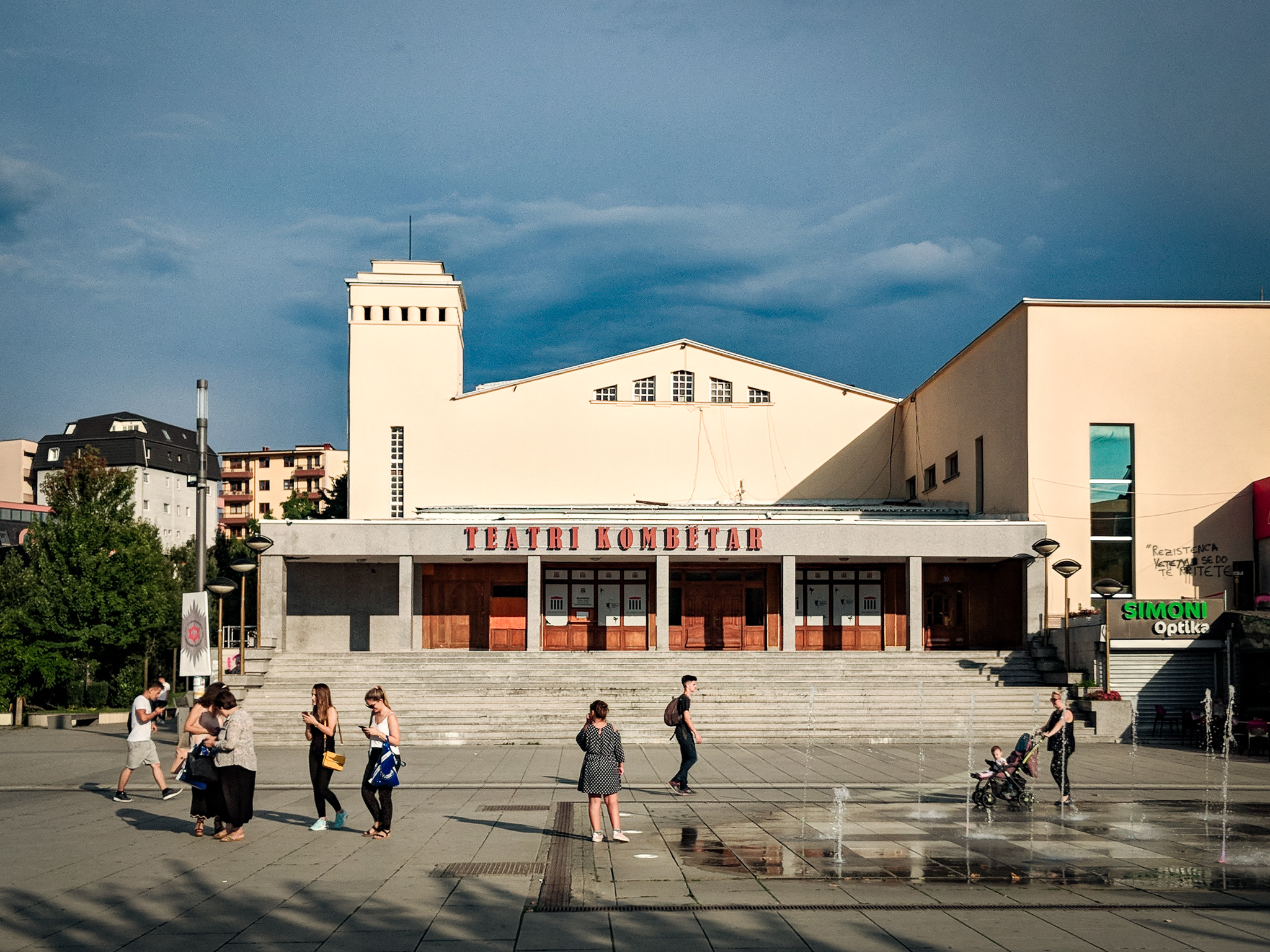
National Theatre of Kosovo

National Theater of Kosovo was founded in October, 1946 in Prizren. This was the first professional theatre in Kosovo after World War II. It was firstly named "The Regional Populist Theater" then the "Provincial Populist Theater" until 1999 when it was finally changed to "The National Theater of Kosovo". After a few months after the establishment, the theater was moved to Pristina, the capital city of Kosovo. The first performances of the theatre were mostly created by amateur artists and talented and enthusiastic idealists which were aided from professional artists from other theaters of ex-Yugoslavia. Until 1989 there were over 400 premiers with over 10,000 replays showed in the theatre which were followed by over 3.2 million spectators. The repertoire of this theater was built on texts of many national, global and former Yugoslavian dramatics. These theatre performances, which were presented in different festivals with national and international character in the former Yugoslavia, were praised highly by critics of the time and were honored with various artistic awards.

In 1967, the play "Erveheja" of director Muharrem Qena was honored with the Award for the Best Drama in the Yugoslavian Drama Festival "Sterijino Pozorje". In addition to performances in the Albanian language, there were also performances in the Serbian language, especially after 1981 when the theater was operating under heavy politic pressure from the Yugoslavian communist regime.

In 1990, the rigorous regime of Slobodan Milosevic placed the theatre under a violent administration by expelling the Albanian artists from the theater and putting it under totalitarian control. During this period, in a parallel university education system created against the totalitarian regime, many school-homes were created from the artistic ensemble, which were already part of this professional ensemble theatre.

After the war in 1999, there have been numerous national and international plays in the theatre. The theatre is of a national character, as such, it is funded by the Ministry of Culture, Youth and Sports of the Republic of Kosovo.

=== Plays ===
- In 2008: “ Çifti Martin” (“The Martin couple”), “Tartufi”(“Tartuf”), “Motra e katërt” (“The fourth Sister”), “Liria po vjen” (“Freedom is coming”).
- In 2009: “Dejzilend” (“Daisyland”), “Bodrumi” (“The basement”), “Rebelët” (“The Rebels”), “Mashtruesit” (“The Cheaters”), “Vdekja dhe Vasha” (“The Death and the Girl”), “Norway, Today”.
- In 2010: “Peer Gynt”, “Heshtja” (“The Silence”), “Clooser”
- In 2011: “Fizikantët” (“The Physicants”), “Udhëtimi” (“The Roadtrip”), ” Nata e Helverit” (“The Helver Night”), “Leksioni I Yu-Mitologjisë” (“The Lecture of Yu-Mythology”)
- In 2012: “Nora” (“Nora”), “Lisistrata”, “Dosja H” (“The file on H”), “Shtëpia në ankand” (“House in auction”).
- In 2013: “Dëshmitari” (“The witness”), “Përplasjet” (“The Clash”), “Mbas Zonjushës Julie” (“After Miss Julies”), “Narnia”

=== Notable people ===
- Actors: Istref Begolli, Muharrem Qena, Sylë Kuçi, Drita Krasniqi, Selman Jusufi , Igballe Qena, Fatime Lajçi, Leze Qena, Fatime Lugiqi, Shirine Morina, Bislim Muçaj, Hysnijë Muçaj, Kumrije Hoxha, Mehmet Breznica, Ismet Azemi, Drita Begolli, Veton Osmani, Lumnije Muçaj-Sopi, Xhejlane Godanci, Adhurim Demi, Basri Lushtaku, Naim Berisha, Fatmir Spahiu, Xhevat Qena, Nëntor Fetiu, Dibran Tahiri, Adem Mikullovci, Luan Jaha, Lirak Çelaj
- Author: Beqir Musliu
- Directors: Fetah Mehmeti, Kristë Berisha, Fadil Hysaj, Isa Qosja, Besim Sahatçiu, Agim Sopi, Selami Taraku, Jeton Budima, Ilir Bokshi, Esat Brajshori, Atdhe Gashi.
- Designer: Linda Polloshka, Violeta Xhaferi, Iliriana Loxha, Lumturije Gashi.

=== Awards 1950–1979 ===
The first professional award took Shani Pallaska in "Personi i dyshimtë" ("The suspicious person") of Nushiq, in the first professional festival of theatres in Serbia, held in Belgrade in 1950.

- In December 1963 the Theatre was awarded with "Shpërblimi i Vukut" ("The Vuk Award") and "Shpërblimi i publikut("The audience Award") for the culture development and artistic expression.
- In 1969 in Udzice, the Albanian drama with “Fosilet”(“Bones”) was awarded for the actor part. This award was given to Istref Begolli.
- In 1969 in Shabac, the Serbian drama “Rruga e zhvillimit e Boro Shnjaderit” (“The developing road of Boro Shnjader”) of Popovic, wins the prize “Mysafiri i Qytetit” (“The City Guest”), for the best performance, directed by Lubo Milosovic, and the first prize for acting Stojan Stojanovic.
- In 1971, Josip Broz Tito awarded the theatre with the "Bashkim Vëllazërim" with the golden crown.
- The theatre was also honored with the "December Award of Kosova" and "November Award of Prishtina".
- In 1970 in Leskovc, the Albanian drama “Duke pritur Godonë” (“Waiting for Godone”), of Beket, was awarded for direction, which was given to Luba Milosovic.
- In 1972 in Zajecar, the Serbian drama “Hamlet in the basement” took the first prize for acting-Cun Lajci.
- In 1975 in Kragujevc, the Albanian drama “Gjenerali i ushtrise se vdekur” (“The General of the Dead Army”) by Ismail Kadare actors: Istref Begolli and Shani Pallaska were awarded as the best male actors.
- In 1979, the theatre was honored with the AVNOJ Award.

== Oda Theatre ==
=== History of the theatre ===
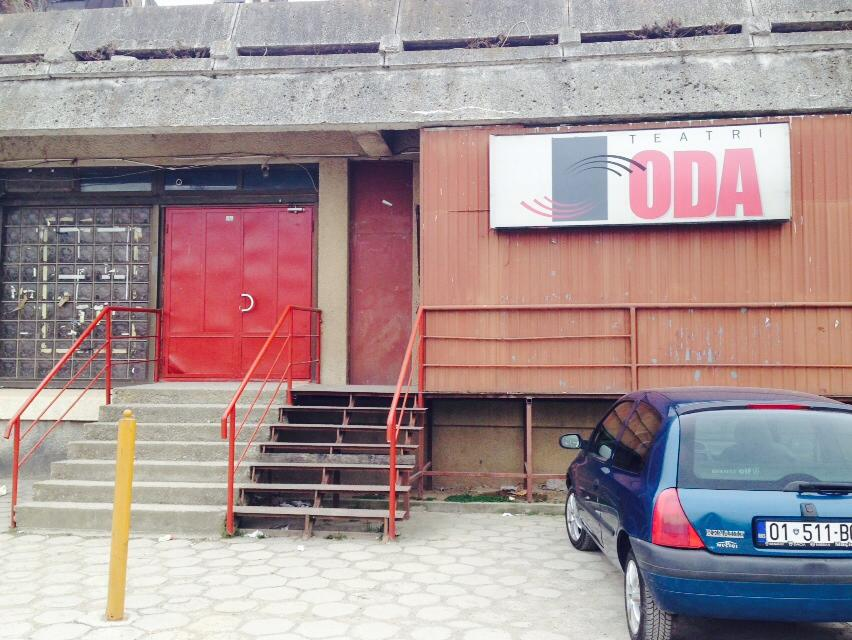
ODA Theatre in Pristina

(42.661°N 21.156°E)

The independent ODA Theatre in Pristina, Kosovo was founded at the end of year 2002 as an artistic initiative of Lirak Celaj (actor) and Florent Mehmeti (director), but it took a few months until the first premiere ("The Vagina Monologues" by Eve Ensler). At the beginning ODA Theatre did not have a permanent space for its activities, even the first theatrical project of this organization, ever the first premiere was practised without knowing where it will be shown. This premiere was shown in a borrowed space, which later that space was transformed and served as a residence of this theatre for a decade. The theatre building had initially been a bowling club and was transformed into a disco club later on and then into a black box-type theater with flexible usage for different set-ups, convenient for a range of events from smaller, more intimate ones to large events. In the absence of founds, even the founders worked hard without ‘respecting’ the hierarchy who what function had. For the space of the theatre was worked systematically, depending on the budgetary possibilities.

By 5 January 2004, ODA Theatre was officially opened with a cocktail party where, in this case, Pristina was made with a new performing scene, and ODA was promoted as a different theatre where on 7 January 2004 was written an article where it is said: It is never enough with theatres, Pristina is the capital city with less theatres in Europe. In period 2003-2011 ODA Theatre has produced 30 theatre productions of its own, several exhibitions, over 70 concerts and around 100 guest performances. The theatre has gained national and European credibility as a leader in the independent culture sector in Pristina.

The first premiere of the ODA Theatre is “The Vagina Monologues” by Eve Ensler. This text is based by the conversation of the author with one of her friends who is ashamed of her body. This conversation pushed the author to interview more than 200 women all around the world. This theatrical show created an initial strategy that the ODA theatre to start its producing with a theatrical show of this kind to cause a “scandal” and to raise the interest of the public.

| Author: | Eve Ensler |
| Director: | Ilir Bokshi and Florent Mehmeti |
| Playing: | Igballe Qena, Arbnesha Grabovca-Nixha, Anisa Ismaili, Gresa Pallaska |
| The set: | Arber Berisha |
| Music: | Astrit Bokshi and Mjellma Pallaska |
| Costumes: | Valbona Saliuka |

=== Oda Hosts ===
The purpose of Oda Theatre was to keep the door always open for other projects. This means that ODA gave chances to work with different companies from in and outside the country. This kind of relationship began from the beginning of ODA Theatre. Some of the collaborations were “Gogoli”("The boogeyman") written by Arianit Krasniqi, directed by Artur Tahiraj, “Njerëzit e Rrugës”("People of the streets") and “Gënjimi”("Lying"). For several years now ODA hosted several festivals, among them are Pristina Jazz Festival, DAM Festival, Rock for Rock Festival, SKENA UP Students Theatre and Film Festival.

=== Plays ===
One of the most known and successful plays of ODA Theatre, which is still known is “Tre Gjërmant e Trashë” (The Three Fat Germans), show which was liked by the majority of public. The first premiere of this play was on 29 September 2004. This play was rated by critics and numerous medial presentations, and also was considered as a comedy with an artistic reality, where everything happens and functiones normally. For very short time, this show managed to surpass the records of views, where only in the first season this show marked 44 replays with a number of 6800 viewers. On 14 June 2005, “Express” newspaper wrote that the show was declared as the biggest scenic success. The success of this show was not to the end. After this project, the director of “Kohavision” proposed to the ODA Theatre director proposed for the idea of realizing a television show on KTV. Since “Tre Gjermant e Trashe”(The Three Fat Germans) was very successful and raised a big interest in public, then they decided to do a serial based on the play, which was shot in ODA Theatre. The first episode of this television show was shown in October 2005, with the same members of the creative crew, and with scenario based on the text of the show, written by Lirak Celaj.

- “Tre Gjermant e Trashë”(The Three Fat Germans) continued having a ‘double life’ by showing on television and on theatre at the same time.

| Written by: | Lirak Celaj |
| Text, director and play: | Lirak Celaj, Kushtrim Sheremeti, Adrian Morina, Teutë Krasniqi, Fatmir Spahiu, Naser Rafuna, Florent Mehmeti and Arta Selimi |
| Playwright: | Doruntina Basha |
| Costumes: | Anita Baraku |
| Music: | Artan Bakia |
| The set: | Petrit Bakalli |

Other successful plays in ODA theatre are:

- “Mundesi qe u shpagua”,
- “Dhoma 13” ("Room 13"),
- “Kanuni”,
- “Endrra e nje nate vere” ("Dream of a summer night"),
- “Grafitet” ("Graffitis"),
- “Doruntina”,
- “Qyteti po rritet” ("The city is growing"),
- “ODA blu” ("Blue ODA"),
- “Lufta Iliri-Romake” ("The Illyrian-Roman War"),
- “Piknik ne Fushebeteje” ("Picnic in the warfield"),
- “Zonja qe i donte pinguinet” ("Ladies who loved penguins").

=== Profile of Audiences ===
ODA Theatre's main audience (around 70 percent of the audience) is relatively young, in the age of 25–35 years of age. The theatre has not done any marketing surveys, and this is based on observations only. It is estimated that in 2011 ODA Theatre had 28.000 visitors for its productions, as well as for visiting events. Together with the Theatre Clubs project ODA Theatre serves on a regular basis around 400 pupils from 20 pilots schools. The overall audience for the performances created in the clubs is around 24.000 pupils in total.

== Dodona Theatre ==
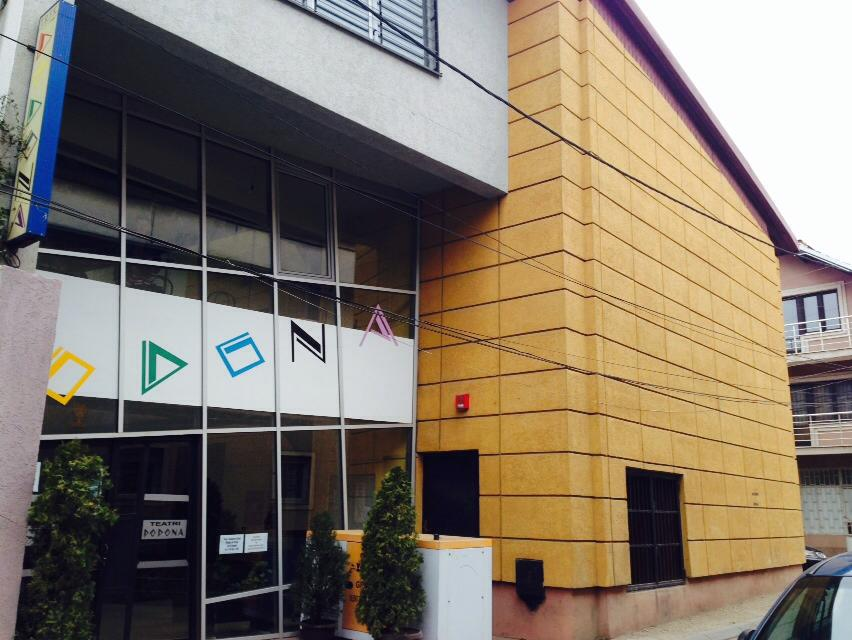
Dodona Theatre in Pristina

=== History of the theatre ===
(42.664°N 21.170°E)

The Dodona Theatre for Youth, Children and puppetry was founded in Pristina on 12 November 1986, initially to provide a forum for youth and children theatre, but also as an alternative to the National Theatre of Kosovo. Rabije Bajrami and Ismajl Ymeri have the greatest credits for founding this theater. A year later in 1987 the theatre was named Dodona. In the first four years of its existence it was under the direction of the Croatian playwright Borislav Mrkic. In 1992, the theatre moved to premises in Xhavit Mitrovica street, which gave it an opportunity to provide parallel performances: children plays in the afternoon and adult performances in the evening. In 1991 Dodona Theatre gained its first employees. The year 1994 was not so good for the Dodona Theatre. There came Radoslav Zlatanovic and all the documentaries were ruined and they stole technical things that were never found. From 1992 until the Serb takeover in 1998, it was under the direction of Enver Petrovci. During these years of work of theatre, a lot of sponsors and donations were given to theatre. The building of the theatre was reconstructed for the first time during 1986-1992, and for the second time during 2004-2006. In March 2011 according to the new status, this temple was transformed into the city theatre of Dodona.

=== Plays ===
One of the most successful plays of all time in Dodona is “Pylli është i të gjithëve” (Forest belongs to everybody). Until today there were shown 37 premieres and 2,784 replies, which were seen by 527,554 viewers. During this time, Dodona theatre was part of different festivals and was awarded with a lot of different prizes and certificates.

1984-2011

- “Pylli është i të gjithëve“ (Forest belongs to everybody)
- “Rosak Baltaku” (Baltak duck),
- “Elefanti i vogël kureshtar” (The little curious elephant),
- “Minuku Lozonjar” (The playful mouse),
- “Posta e porositur” (The ordered order),
- “Picrraku” (The smallest one),
- “Kënga si dhuratë” (A song as a gift),
- “Princesha Zobeida” (Zobeida Princess),
- ”Përralla me lara” (Colorful tales),
- “Qeni që nuk dinte të leh” (The dog who did not know how to bark),
- “Kësulkuqja” (Red Riding Hood).

=== Notable people ===
- Writers: Agim Deva, Arif Demolli, Abdyl Bunjaku, Adelina Mamaqi, Gani Xhafolli, Hajro Ulqinaku, Hivzi Krasniqi, Mark Krasniqi, Rifat Kukaj.
- Directors: Melihate Qena, Borislav Merksic.
- Scene set and puppets: Boris Qerkov, Ismail Rama, Valdet Rama, Arsim Lokaj, Agron Blakqori, Mentor Llapashtica, Mentor Shala.
- Compositors: Xhevdet Gashi, Naim Krasniqi, Pranvera Badivuku, Rauf Dhomi, Trimor Dhomi, Valton Beqiri, Donika Rudi, Agron Shala.
- Actors: Avni Hoti, Avdi Azemi, Faik Gashi, Roya Berisha, Valdet Rama, Esat Ferizi, Ismet Azemi, Veton Osmani, Donika Gashi.

=== Events and festivals ===
Special Projects: Kids Festival: “Lirinë nuk do ta dëshproj”("I will not desperate my freedom"), Play: “Goni në fushën e minave”, Arkobaleno mission, Premiere of the play “Rosak Pastertori”, Dodona and Mabertex group, Premierë “Sytë e gjyshes”
