= Achaeans (tribe) =

Ancient Greek tribe

The Achaeans (/əˈkiːənz/; Greek: Ἀχαιοί, romanized: Akhaioí) were one of the four major tribes into which Herodotus divided the Greeks, along with the Aeolians, Ionians and Dorians. They inhabited the region of Achaea in the northern Peloponnese, and played an active role in the colonization of Italy, founding important cities such as Sybaris, Kroton and Metapontum. Unlike the other major tribes, the Achaeans did not have a separate dialect in the Classical period, instead using a form of Doric.

== Etymology ==
The etymology of the term Ἀχαιοί is unknown. Robert S. P. Beekes proposed that it originated in a Pre-Greek form *Akay^{w}a-. Margalit Finkelberg, while acknowledging that its ultimate etymology is unknown, proposed an intermediate Greek form *Ἀχαϝyοί.

The term Ἀχαιοί was also used by Homer to refer to Greeks as a whole, and may relate to the Hittite term Ahhiyawa, believed to refer to Mycenaean Greece or part of it.

== History ==
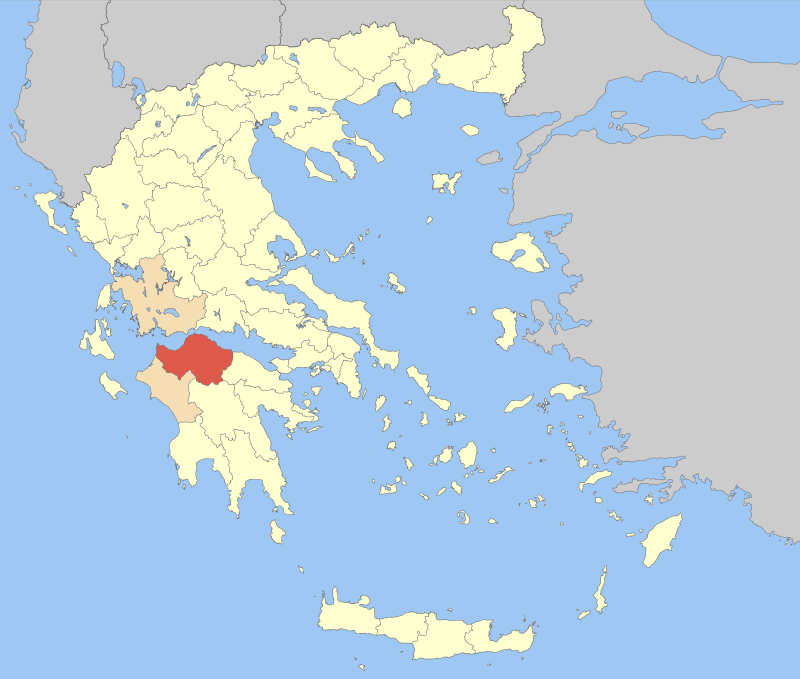
Map of the modern Achaea regional unit

In the Classical era the Achaeans inhabited the region of Achaea in the northern Peloponnese, and later established colonies in Italy including Kroton and Sybaris. They spoke Achaean Doric Greek, a dialect of Doric Greek. In Hellenistic times, an Achaean Doric koine developed which was eventually replaced by the Attic-based Koine Greek in the 2nd century BC.

The Achaeans cemented their common identity in the 6th century BC in response to the rising power of Sicyon to the east and Sparta to the south, and during the 5th century BC in response to the expansionism of the Achaemenids. Herodotus described them as unified nation composed of 12 city-states: Pellene, Aegeira, Aegae, Bura, Helike, Aegion, Rhypes, Patrai, Pherae, Olenos, Dyme and Tritaia. The rise of Macedonia in the late 4th century BC seems to have destroyed this first Achaean League, with the Macedonians eventually controlling so many of the member city-states that the Achaean federal government had virtually ceased to function.

After Macedon's defeat by the Romans in the early 2nd century BC, the League was able to finally defeat a heavily weakened Sparta and take control of the entire Peloponnese. However, as the Roman influence in the area grew, the league erupted into an open revolt against Roman domination, in what is known as Achaean War. The Achaeans were defeated at the Battle of Corinth in 146 BC and the League was dissolved by the Romans.

== Mythology ==
According to the foundation myth formalized by Hesiod, their name comes from their mythic founder Achaeus, who was supposedly one of the sons of Xuthus, and brother of Ion, the founder of the Ionian tribe. Xuthus was in turn the son of Hellen, the mythical patriarch of the Greek (Hellenic) nation.

Both Herodotus and Pausanias recount the legend that the Achaeans (referring to the tribe of the Classical period) originally dwelt in Argolis and Laconia. According to Herodotus, the Achaeans were forced out of those lands by the Dorians, during the legendary Dorian invasion of the Peloponnese. As a consequence, the Achaeans went to the region known as Aegialus and forced the Aegialians (by now known as the Ionians) out of their land. The Ionians took temporary refuge in Athens, and Aegialus became known as Achaea.

Pausanias says that 'Achaean' was the name of those Greeks originally inhabiting the Argolis and Laconia, because they were descended from the sons of the mythical Achaeus, Archander and Architeles. According to Pausanias, Achaeus originally dwelt in Attica, where his father had settled after being expelled from Thessaly. Achaeus later returned to Thessaly to reclaim the land, and it was from there that Archander and Architeles travelled to the Peloponnesus. It was supposedly for this reason that there was also an ancient part of Thessaly known as Phthiotic Achaea.
