= Dodona =

Hellenic oracle

- Δωδώνη (Doric Greek)
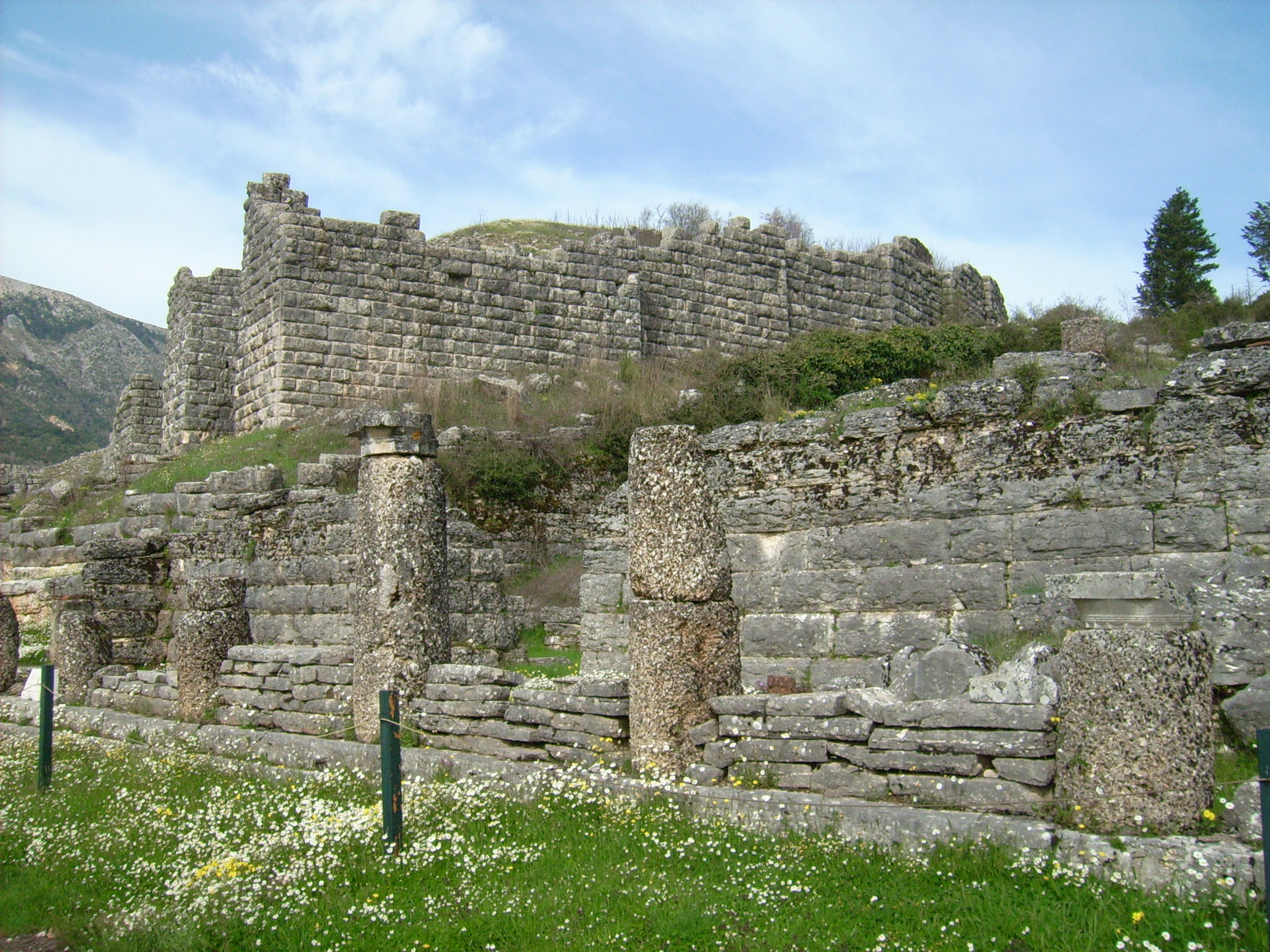
- View of the bouleuterion in Dodona

- Location within Greece
- 39°32′47″N 20°47′16″E
- Type: City and sanctuary
- Periods: Mycenaean Greek to Roman Imperial
- Cultures: Greek, Roman
- Location: Dodoni, Ioannina, Epirus, Greece
- Region: Epirus

History
- Built: 2nd millennium BCE
- Abandoned: 391–392 CE

Site notes
- Condition: Ruined
- Owner: Public
- Public access: Yes

Dodona (/doʊˈdoʊnə/; Doric Greek: Δωδώνα, romanized: Dōdṓnā, Ionic and Attic Greek: Δωδώνη, Dōdṓnē) in Epirus in northwestern Greece was the oldest Hellenic oracle, possibly dating to the 2nd millennium BCE according to Herodotus. The earliest accounts in Homer describe Dodona as an oracle of Zeus. Situated in a remote region away from the main Greek poleis, it was considered second only to the Oracle of Delphi in prestige.

Aristotle considered the region around Dodona to have been part of Hellas and the region where the Hellenes originated. The oracle was first under the control of the Thesprotians before it passed into the hands of the Molossians. It remained an important religious sanctuary until the rise of Christianity during the Late Roman era.

== Description ==
During classical antiquity, according to various accounts, priestesses and priests in the sacred grove interpreted the rustling of the oak (or beech) leaves to determine the correct actions to be taken. According to a new interpretation, the oracular sound originated from bronze objects hanging from oak branches and sounded with the wind blowing, similar to a wind chime.

According to Nicholas Hammond, Dodona was an oracle devoted to a Mother Goddess (identified at other sites with Rhea or Gaia, but here called Dione) who was joined and partly supplanted in historical times by the Greek deity Zeus.

== History ==
=== Early history ===
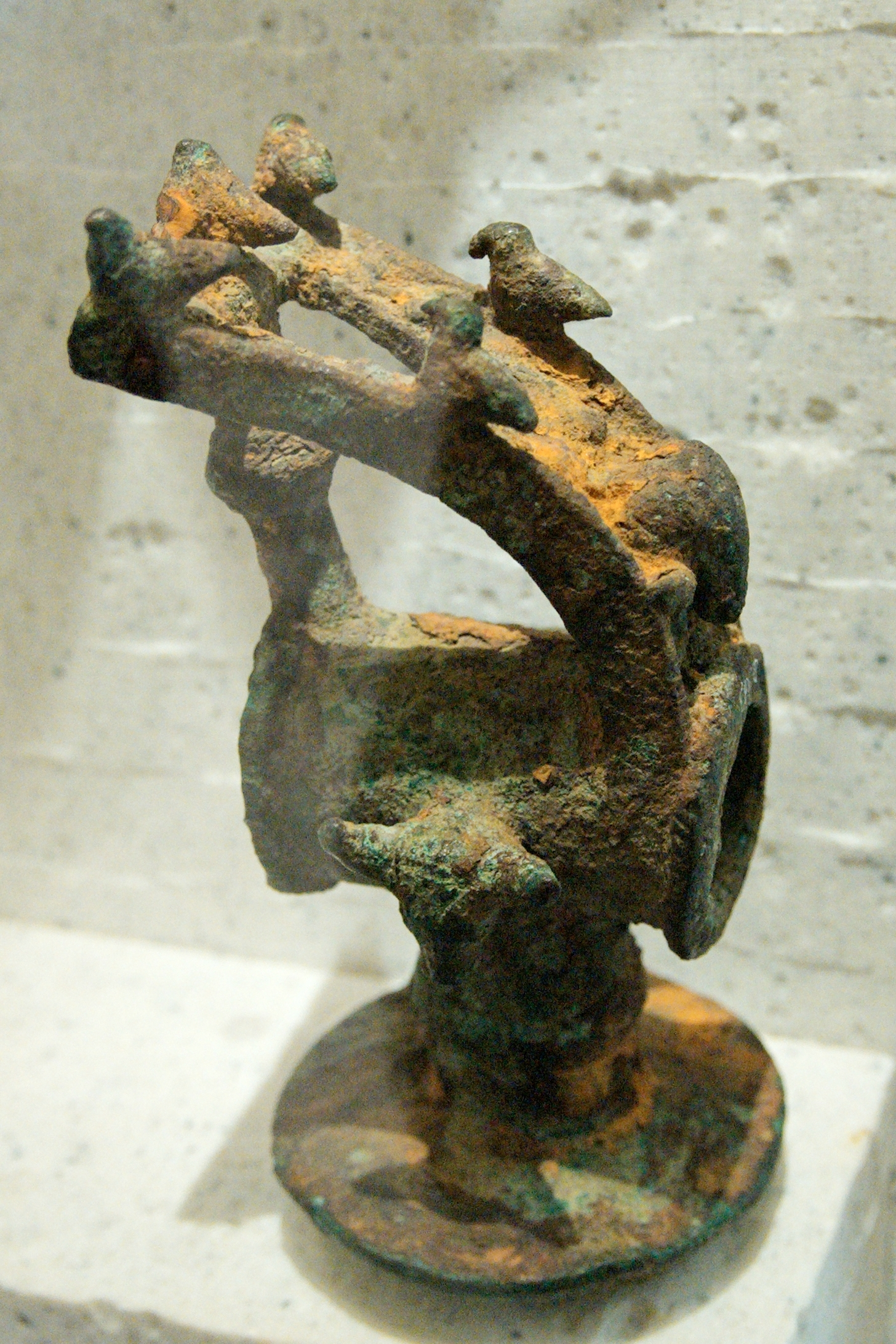
Bronze sacrificial hammer from Dodona, 7th century BCE, Louvre Museum

Although the earliest inscriptions at the site date to c. 550–500 BCE, archaeological excavations conducted for more than a century have recovered artifacts as early as the Mycenaean era, many now at the National Archaeological Museum of Athens, and some in the nearby Archaeological Museum of Ioannina. There was an ancient tradition that Dodona was founded as a colony from the city, also named Dodona, in Thessaly.

Cult activity at Dodona was already established in some form during the Late Bronze Age (or Mycenaean period). Mycenaean offerings such as bronze objects of the 14th and 13th centuries were brought in Dodona. A 13th century cist tomb with squared shoulders was found at Dodona; it had no context, but a Mycenaean sherd of c. 1200 B.C. was also unearthed on the site, in association with kylix stems. Archaeological evidence shows that the cult of Zeus was established around the same time. During the post-Mycenaean period (or "Greek Dark Ages"), evidence of activity at Dodona is scant, but there is a resumption of contact between Dodona and southern Greece during the Archaic period (8th century BCE) with the presence of bronze votive offerings (i.e. tripods) from southern Greek cities. Dedication to the Oracle of Dodona arrived from most of the Greek world including its colonies. Although an adjacent area there were few Illyrian dedication most probably because the Oracle preferred interaction with the Greek world. Until 650 BCE, Dodona was a religious and oracular centre mainly for northern tribes; only after 650 BCE did it become important for the southern tribes.

Zeus was worshipped at Dodona as "Zeus Naios" or "Naos" (god of the spring below the oak in the temenos or sanctuary, cf. Naiads) and as "Zeus Bouleus" (Counsellor). According to Plutarch, the worship of Jupiter (Zeus) at Dodona was set up by Deucalion and Pyrrha.

The earliest mention of Dodona is in Homer, and only Zeus is mentioned in this account. In the Iliad (circa 750 BCE), Achilles prays to "High Zeus, Lord of Dodona, Pelasgian, living afar off, brooding over wintry Dodona" (thus demonstrating that Zeus also could be invoked from a distance). No buildings are mentioned, and the priests (called Selloi) slept on the ground with unwashed feet. No priestesses are mentioned in Homer.

The oracle also features in another passage involving Odysseus, giving a story of his visit to Dodona. Odysseus's words "bespeak a familiarity with Dodona, a realization of its importance, and an understanding that it was normal to consult Zeus there on a problem of personal conduct."

The details of this story are as follows. Odysseus says to the swineherd Eumaeus (possibly giving him a fictive account) that he (Odysseus) was seen among the Thesprotians, having gone to inquire of the oracle at Dodona whether he should return to Ithaca openly or in secret (as the disguised Odysseus is doing). Odysseus later repeats the same tale to Penelope, who may not yet have seen through his disguise.

According to some scholars, Dodona was originally an oracle of the Mother Goddess attended by priestesses. She was identified at other sites as Rhea or Gaia. The oracle also was shared by Dione. By classical times, Dione was relegated to a minor role elsewhere in classical Greece, being made into an aspect of Zeus's more usual consort, Hera — but never at Dodona.

Many dedicatory inscriptions recovered from the site mention both "Dione" and "Zeus Naios".

According to some archaeologists, it was not until the 4th century BCE that a small stone temple to Dione was added to the site. By the time Euripides mentioned Dodona (fragmentary play Melanippe) and Herodotus wrote about the oracle, the priestesses had appeared at the site.

Over 4200 oracular tablets have been found in Dodona, written in different alphabets, and dated approximately between the mid-6th and early 2nd centuries BCE. All the texts were written in Greek, and attest to over 1200 personal names from different areas; these were almost exclusively Greek, with non-Greek names (e.g. Thracian, Illyrian) making up around 1% of the total.

=== Classical and Hellenistic Greece ===
A map of the main sanctuaries in Classical Greece.

Though it never eclipsed the Oracle of Apollo at Delphi, Dodona gained a reputation far beyond Greece. In the Argonautica of Apollonius of Rhodes, a retelling of an older story of Jason and the Argonauts, Jason's ship, the "Argo", had the gift of prophecy, because it contained an oak timber spirited from Dodona.

In c. 290 BCE, King Pyrrhus made Dodona the religious capital of his domain and beautified it by implementing a series of construction projects (i.e. grandly rebuilt the Temple of Zeus, developed many other buildings, added a festival featuring athletic games, musical contests, and drama enacted in a theatre). A wall was built around the oracle itself and the holy tree, as well as temples to Dione and Heracles.

In 219 BCE, the Aetolians, under the leadership of General Dorimachus, looted and set fire to the sanctuary. During the late 3rd century BCE, King Philip V of Macedon (along with the Epirotes) reconstructed all the buildings at Dodona. In 167 BCE, the Molossian cities and possibly Dodona itself were destroyed by the Romans (led by Aemilius Paulus). A fragment of Dio Cassius reports that Thracian soldiers instigated by King Mithridates sacked the sanctuary ca. 88 BCE. In the reign of the emperor Augustus the site was prominent enough to feature an honorary statue of Livia. The 2nd century CE traveller Pausanias noted a sacred oak tree of Zeus. In 241 CE, a priest named Poplius Memmius Leon organized the Naia festival of Dodona. In 362 CE, Emperor Julian consulted the oracle prior to his military campaigns against the Persians.

Pilgrims still consulted the oracle until 391-392 CE when Emperor Theodosius closed all pagan temples, banned all pagan religious activities, and cut down the ancient oak tree at the sanctuary of Zeus. Although the surviving town was insignificant, the long-hallowed pagan site must have retained significance for Christians given that a bishop of Dodona named Theodorus attended the First Council of Ephesus in 431 CE.

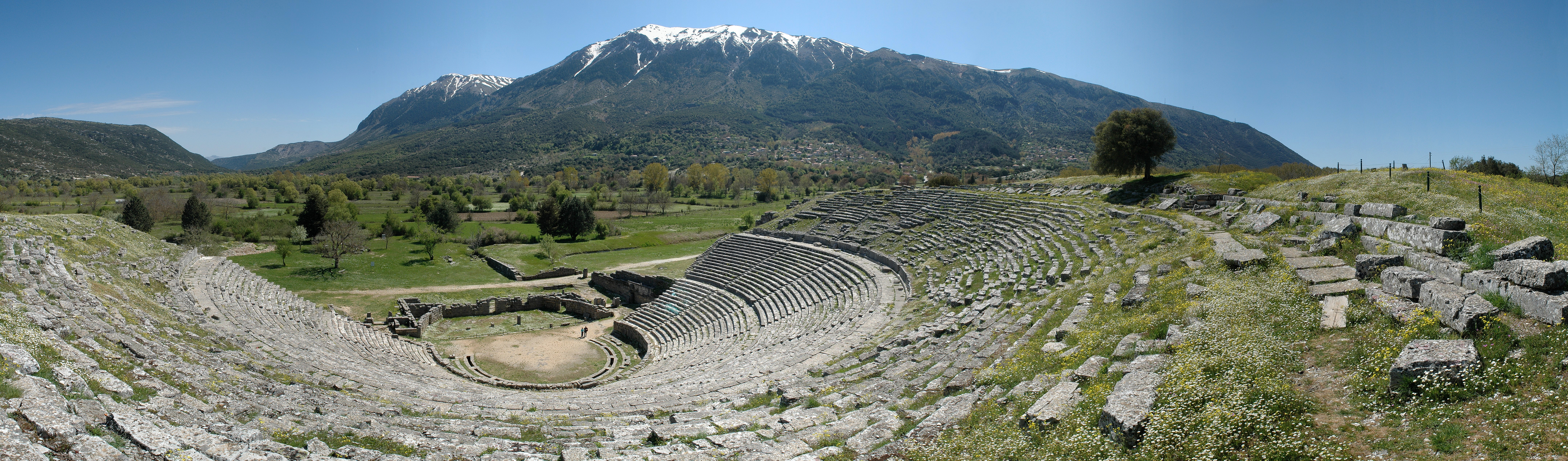
Panorama of the theatre of Dodona, the modern village Dodoni and the snow-capped Mount Tomaros are visible in the background

== Herodotus ==
Plan of the sanctuary, as it developed up to the Roman period. #16 on this map is the Christian Basilica that occupies the site of the former Zeus temple.

Herodotus (Histories 2:54–57) was told by priests at Egyptian Thebes in the 5th century BCE "that two priestesses had been carried away from Thebes by Phoenicians; one, they said they had heard was taken away and sold in Libya, the other in Hellas; these women, they said, were the first founders of places of divination in the aforesaid countries." The simplest analysis of the quote is: Egypt, for Greeks as well as for Egyptians, was a spring of human culture of all but immeasurable antiquity. This mythic element says that the oracles at the oasis of Siwa in Libya and of Dodona in Epirus were equally old, but similarly transmitted by Phoenician culture, and that the seeresses – Herodotus does not say "sibyls" – were women.

Herodotus follows with what he was told by the prophetesses, called peleiades ("doves") at Dodona:

that two black doves had come flying from Thebes in Egypt, one to Libya and one to Dodona; the latter settled on an oak tree, and there uttered human speech, declaring that a place of divination from Zeus must be made there; the people of Dodona understood that the message was divine, and therefore established the oracular shrine. The dove which came to Libya told the Libyans (they say) to make an oracle of Ammon; this also is sacred to Zeus. Such was the story told by the Dodonaean priestesses, the eldest of whom was Promeneia and the next Timarete and the youngest Nicandra; and the rest of the servants of the temple at Dodona similarly held it true.

In the simplest analysis, this was a confirmation of the oracle tradition in Egypt. The element of the dove may be an attempt to account for a folk etymology applied to the archaic name of the sacred women that no longer made sense and the eventual connection with Zeus, justified by a tale told by a priestess. Was the pel- element in their name connected with "black" or "muddy" root elements in names like "Peleus" or "Pelops"? Is that why the doves were black?

Herodotus adds:

But my own belief about it is this. If the Phoenicians did in fact carry away the sacred women and sell one in Libya and one in Hellas, then, in my opinion, the place where this woman was sold in what is now Hellas, but was formerly called Pelasgia, was Thesprotia; and then, being a slave there, she established a shrine of Zeus under an oak that was growing there; for it was reasonable that, as she had been a handmaid of the temple of Zeus at Thebes, she would remember that temple in the land to which she had come. After this, as soon as she understood the Greek language, she taught divination; and she said that her sister had been sold in Libya by the same Phoenicians who sold her. I expect that these women were called 'doves' by the people of Dodona because they spoke a strange language, and the people thought it like the cries of birds; then the woman spoke what they could understand, and that is why they say that the dove uttered human speech; as long as she spoke in a foreign tongue, they thought her voice was like the voice of a bird. For how could a dove utter the speech of men? The tale that the dove was black signifies that the woman was Egyptian.

Thesprotia, on the coast west of Dodona, would have been available to the seagoing Phoenicians, whom readers of Herodotus would not have expected to have penetrated as far inland as Dodona.

== Strabo ==
According to Strabo, the oracle was founded by the Pelasgi:

This oracle, according to Ephorus, was founded by the Pelasgi. And the Pelasgi are called the earliest of all peoples who have held dominion in Greece.

The site of the oracle was dominated by Mount Tomaros, the area being controlled by the Thesprotians and then the Molossians:

In ancient times, then, Dodona was under the rule of the Thesprotians; and so was Mount Tomaros, or Tmaros (for it is called both ways), at the base of which the temple is situated. And both the tragic poets and Pindaros have called Dodona 'Thesprotian Dodona.' But later on it came under the rule of the Molossoi.

According to Strabo, the prophecies were originally uttered by men:

At the outset, it is true, those who uttered the prophecies were men (this too perhaps the poet indicates, for he calls them “hypophetae” [interpreters] and the prophets might be ranked among these), but later on three old women were designated as prophets, after Dione also had been designated as temple-associate of Zeus.

Strabo also reports as uncertain the story that the predecessor of Dodona oracle was located in Thessaly:

...the temple [oracle] was transferred from Thessaly, from the part of Pelasgia which is about Scotussa (and Scotussa does belong to the territory called Thessalia Pelasgiotis), and also that most of the women whose descendants are the prophetesses of today went along at the same time; and it is from this fact that Zeus was also called “Pelasgian.”

In a fragment of Strabo we find the following:

Among the Thesprotians and the Molossians old women are called "peliai" and old men "pelioi," as is also the case among the Macedonians; at any rate, those people call their dignitaries "peligones" (compare the gerontes among the Laconians and the Massaliotes). And this, it is said, is the origin of the myth about the pigeons [peleiades] in the Dodonaean oak-tree.

== Other commentaries ==
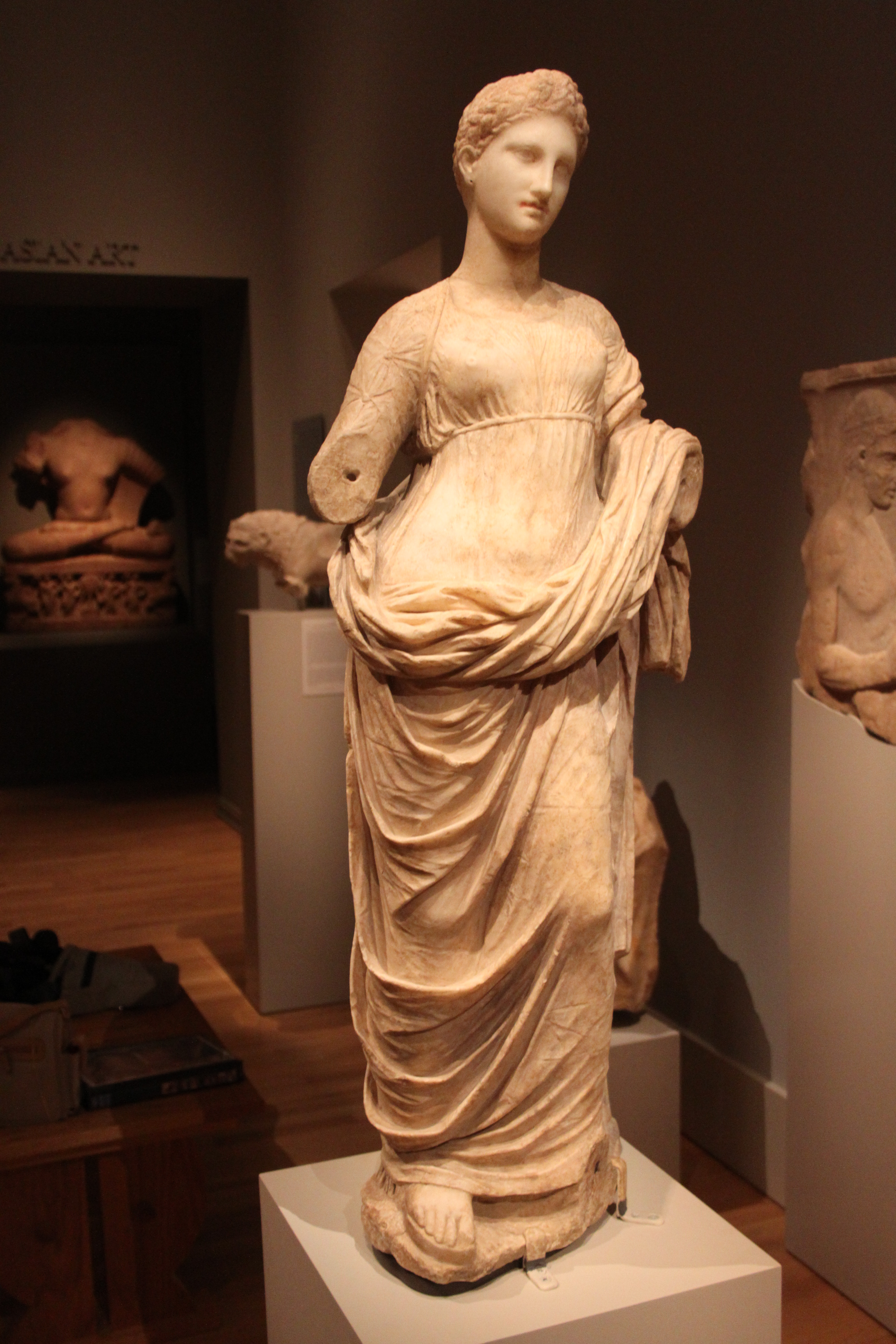
Terpsichore of Dodona, exhibited in 2010 in the Michael C. Carlos Museum, Atlanta.

According to Sir Richard Claverhouse Jebb, the epithet Neuos of Zeus at Dodona primarily designated "the god of streams, and, generally, of water". Jebb also points out that Achelous, as a water deity, received special honours at Dodona. The area of the oracle was quite swampy, with lakes in the area and reference to the "holy spring" of Dodona may be a later addition.

Jebb mostly follows Strabo in his analysis. Accordingly, he notes that the Selloi, the prophets of Zeus, were also called tomouroi, which name derived from Mount Tomares. Tomouroi was also a variant reading found in the Odyssey.

According to Jebb, the Peleiades at Dodona were very early, and preceded the appointment of Phemonoe, the prophetess at Delphi. The introduction of female attendants probably took place in the fifth century. The timing of change is clearly prior to Herodotus (5th century BCE), with his narrative about the doves and Egypt.

Aristotle (Meteorologica, 1.14) places 'Hellas' in the parts about Dodona and the Achelous and says it was inhabited by "the Selloi, who were formerly called Graikoi, but now Hellenes."

The alternative reading of Selloi is Helloi. Aristotle clearly uses "Dodona" as the designation of the whole district in which the oracle was situated. Thus, according to some scholars, the origin of the words "Hellenes" and "Hellas" was from Dodona. Also, the word "Greece" may have been derived from this area.

== See also ==
- List of cities in ancient Epirus
