= Leontiades (Thermopylae) =

Early 5th-century BC Theban commander

Leontiades was the commander of the 400-man Theban contingent of the Greek army at the Battle of Thermopylae. Little was recorded about his life before or after the battle, but according to Herodotus he was the son of Eurymachus, and also the father of another Eurymachus who would play a leading role at the much later Siege of Plataea.

The Boeotian-Greek city of Thebes had paid tokens of submission to a herald of the Persian King Xerxes while his army was still crossing through Macedon toward Greece, as had most of the other Boeotians, the Thessalians, and numerous other northern Greek tribes. The Spartan king Leonidas, therefore wary of Theban loyalty, pressed for Thebes to send troops to join him to test whether they would honor or refuse the Greek alliance against the Persians. Thebes responded by sending 400 hoplites, led by Leontiades, to join the Greek coalition at the mountain pass of Thermopylae.

For the first two days of battle, Leontiades’s contingent fought in rotation with the other Greeks against the Persians. When Leonidas dismissed most of the Greek army from the pass after the Persians learned on the second night of a route by which they could encircle the Greek position, Leontiades's Thebans were the only group which Leonidas compelled to remain there with his Spartans, although the Thespians led by Demophilus stayed as well, refusing the order to withdraw. On the third day, the Thebans initially fought alongside the Spartans and Thespians. But when the Persian encirclement of the pass was completed and the Spartans and Thespians retreated to the position of their final stand, Leontiades and the Thebans took the opportunity to split off and rush forward to surrender.

Some of the Thebans were slain as they approached the Persians, but they were able to make the case that their loyalty had always been to Persia; that they had been among the first Greeks to offer Xerxes tokens of submission, had only come to Thermopylae under duress from the Greek allies, and were guiltless of any harm done to Xerxes. The Thessalians in Xerxes's army bore witness that the Thebans spoke the truth, and the Thebans' lives were spared. At the order of Xerxes, Leontiades and each of his surviving men were then branded with the king's marks.

== See also ==
- Greco-Persian Wars
- Second Persian invasion of Greece
- Megistias the Seer
- Aristodemus of Sparta
- Eurytus of Sparta
- Leontiades
