= 300: March to Glory =

2007 video game

- Developer: Collision Studios
- Publisher: Warner Bros. Interactive Entertainment
- Producer: Bryan Jury
- Designer: Charles Staples
- Artist: Scott Fabianek
- Composer: Tyler Bates
- Engine: Vicious Engine
- Platform: PlayStation Portable
- Release: NA: February 27, 2007; EU: March 30, 2007; AU: April 13, 2007
- Genre: Hack and slash
- Mode: Single-player

300: March to Glory is a video game by American developer Collision Studios for the PlayStation Portable (PSP) that was released on February 27, 2007 and is based on the 1998 comic book mini-series 300 by Frank Miller and as well the 2007 movie of the same name.

== Story ==
This game begins shortly before the Battle of Thermopylae where players controls Leonidas, fighting through scenes from both the movie and comic franchise. Armour can be upgraded, as can weaponry and stats as rewards when players are done with levels to help on later ones. The player battles through hordes of Persian warriors including slaves, spearmen, archers, Immortals, Persian champions, two Persian generals, Mardonius and Hydarnes II. The action is furthered when the Spartan army forms a phalanx formation. This is used to fight not only even more Persians, but giant beasts such as elephants also. And as this game keeps progressing, Leonidas soon gains this ability to wield more than one sword and change between many weapon styles.

== Reception ==
Reception

Aggregate score
Aggregator	Score
Metacritic	55/100

Review scores
Publication	Score
Eurogamer	4/10
Game Informer	6.25/10
GamePro	2.25/5
GameRevolution	C−
GameSpot	6.8/10
GameSpy	2.5/5
GameTrailers	5.8/10
GameZone	6.5/10
IGN	5.7/10
PlayStation: The Official Magazine	6/10

The game received "mixed" reviews according to the review aggregation website Metacritic.
