= The 300 Spartans =

1962 epic historical drama film by Rudolph Maté

- Theatrical release poster
- Directed by: Rudolph Maté
- Screenplay by: George St. George
- Story by: Gian Paolo Callegari; Remigio Del Grosso; Giovanni d'Eramo; Ugo Liberatore
- Produced by: Rudolph Maté; George St. George
- Starring: Richard Egan; Ralph Richardson; Diane Baker; Barry Coe; David Farrar; Donald Houston; Anna Synodinou
- Cinematography: Geoffrey Unsworth
- Edited by: Jerry Webb
- Music by: Manos Hadjidakis
- Color process: DeLuxe Color
- Production company: 20th Century Fox
- Distributed by: 20th Century Fox
- Release date: August 29, 1962 (US)
- Running time: 114 minutes
- Country: United States
- Language: English
- Budget: £500,000 (approximately $1,350,000.)
- Box office: $76,520,000

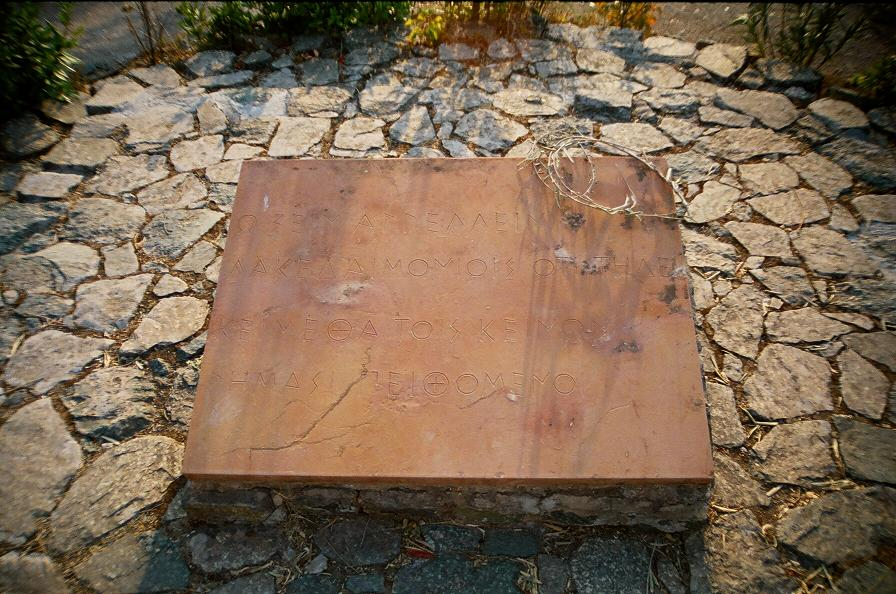
Epitaph with Simonides' epigram (modern replica)

The 300 Spartans is a 1962 CinemaScope epic historical drama film depicting the Battle of Thermopylae. It was directed by Rudolph Maté and stars Richard Egan, Ralph Richardson, David Farrar, Diane Baker, and Barry Coe. Produced with the cooperation of the Greek government, it was filmed in the village of Perachora in the Peloponnese.

When the film was released in 1962, some critics perceived it as a commentary on the Cold War.

== Plot ==
King Xerxes I of Persia leads a vast army of soldiers into Europe to defeat the small city-states of Greece, not only to fulfill the idea of “one world ruled by one master”, but also to avenge the defeat of his father Darius I at the Battle of Marathon 10 years before. Accompanying him are Artemisia, the Queen of Halicarnassus, who beguiles Xerxes with her charm, and Demaratus, an exiled king of Sparta, whose warnings Xerxes does not heed. Xerxes releases a captured Spartan soldier, Agathon, and tells him to inform the Greeks of their impending doom.

In Corinth, General Themistocles of Athens wins the support of the Greek city-states and convinces both their delegates and the Spartan representative, King Leonidas I, to grant Sparta leadership of the allied Greek forces, with Themistocles himself put in charge of the Athenian navy, recently reinforced with 200 new ships. Outside the hall, Leonidas and Themistocles agree to fortify the narrow pass at Thermopylae with a vanguard force until the rest of the army arrives.

After learning of the Persian advance from Agathon, Leonidas travels to Sparta to rally the troops. In Sparta, his fellow king Leotychidas II is fighting a losing battle with the ephors – a council of five magistrates – over the religious harvest festival of Carneia that is due to take place, with members of the council arguing that the army should wait until the festival is over before marching to war, while Leotychidas fears that by that time, the Persians may have conquered Greece. Leonidas decides to march north immediately with his personal bodyguard of 300 veteran men, who are exempt from the decisions of the ephors and the Gerousia, while Leotychidas remains in Sparta. The 300 Spartans are subsequently reinforced by a contingent of about 700 volunteer Thespians led by Demophilus, and a few other Greek allies.

After several days of fighting, Xerxes grows angry as his army is repeatedly routed by the Greeks, with the Spartans in the forefront. Leonidas receives word sent by his wife that, by decision of the ephors, the remainder of the Spartan army, rather than joining him as he had expected, will only fortify the isthmus in the Peloponnese and will advance no further. The Greeks constantly beat back the Persians; following the defeat of most of his "Immortals" (personal bodyguard) by the Spartans and the death in battle of two of his brothers, Xerxes begins to consider withdrawing to Sardis until he can equip a larger force at a later date.

He prepares to withdraw, as advised by Artemesia (who, having a Greek mother, may have her own agenda to dissuade the king from continuing the invasion). Xerxes, however, receives word from the treacherous and avaricious Ephialtes, who has been also spurned by Spartan maiden Ellas (who accompanied her Spartan soldier boyfriend Phyllon to the battlefield, where he wishes to prove his courage), of a secret old goat-track through the mountains that will enable Persian forces to attack the Greeks from the rear. Promising to richly reward the traitorous goatherd for his betrayal (as Ephialtes had expected), an emboldened Xerxes sends his army onward. The Phocian troops dispatched by Leonidas to guard the secret path are summarily defeated.

Once Leonidas realizes he will be surrounded, he sends away the Greek allies to alert the cities to the south. Being too few to hold the pass, the Spartans instead attack the Persian front, where Xerxes is nearby. Leonidas is killed in the melée. Meanwhile, the Thespians, who had refused to leave, are overwhelmed (offscreen) while defending the rear. Surrounded, the surviving Spartans refuse Xerxes's demand to give up Leonidas' body in exchange for safe passage. They are then all annihilated as the remaining Immortals rain down a barrage of arrows.

After this, narration states that the Battle of Salamis and the Battle of Plataea end the Persian invasion, but that the Greeks could not have been organized and victorious without the time bought by the 300 Spartans who defied the tyranny of Xerxes at Thermopylae. One of the final images of the film is the stone memorial bearing the epigram of Simonides of Ceos, which the narrator recites in honor of the slain 300 Spartan men's bravery :

"Oh stranger, tell the Spartans that we lie here obedient to their word."

Then ends with "...But it was more than a victory for Greece, it was a stirring example to free people throughout the world of what a few brave men can accomplish once they refuse to submit to tyranny!"

== Cast ==
- Richard Egan as King Leonidas of Sparta
- Ralph Richardson as Themistocles of Athens
- Diane Baker as Ellas, daughter of Pentheus
- Barry Coe as Phyllon, Spartan in love with Ellas
- David Farrar as King Xerxes of Persia
- Donald Houston as Hydarnes, leader of the Persian Immortals
- Anna Synodinou as Queen Gorgo of Sparta
- Kieron Moore as Ephialtes of Trachis, farm worker & Greek traitor
- John Crawford as Agathon, Spartan spy and soldier
- Robert Brown as Pentheus, Leonidas' second-in-command
- Laurence Naismith a Greek delegate
- Anne Wakefield as Artemisia, Queen of Halicarnassus
- Ivan Triesault as Demaratus, exiled former King of Sparta
- Charles Fernley Fawcett as Megistias, Spartan priest
- Michalis Nikolinakos as Myron, a Spartan
- Sandro Giglio as Xenathon, a Spartan Ephor
- Dimos Starenios as Samos, a goatherd
- Anna Raftopoulou as Toris, Samos' wife
- Yorgos Moutsios as Demophilus, leader of the Thespians
- Nikos Papakonstantinou as Grellas, a Spartan in Xerxes' camp
- John G. Contes as Artovadus, Persian general
- Marietta Flemotomos as a Greek woman
- Kostas Baladimas as Mardonius, Persian general
- Zannino as Athenian citizen, Persian general

== Production ==
The film's working title was Lion of Sparta.

The 300 Spartans was filmed on location in Greece, with the support of the Greek government and army. Hundreds of Greek soldiers were employed as extras to stage the large-scale battle scenes at Thermopylae. The production was a collaboration between 20th Century-Fox and local Greek authorities, reflecting the broader trend of American studios outsourcing production overseas during the decline of the classical Hollywood studio system.

The battle scenes were shot around Vouliagmenis Lagoon (north of Loutraki and the Corinth Canal and west of the village of Perachora; northwest of Athens), not to be confused with the much smaller Lake Vouliagmeni, due south of Athens. The northern Corinthian site doubled as Thermopylae and the surrounding areas, as it had become impossible to shoot at the actual location in Thermopylae. After 2,500 years of receding coastline, the strait where the actual battle was fought in 480 BC had converted into a broad coastal plain facing the Malian Gulf, adding about 3.5 km of dry land to the coastline by the mid-20th century.

The Greek Defense Ministry made as many as 5,000 members of the Hellenic Army available for a prenegotiated fee. However, budgetary constraints reduced the numbers to only two battalions (about 1,100 men). The largest establishing scenes of the Persian army entering Greece used many of these soldiers, together with a combined total of several hundred civilian extras, horses, cattle, ox carts, and chariots. For the wider establishing scenes of the battle, one battalion was retained to play both Greeks (about 450 soldier extras) and Persians (about 650 soldiers). For closer compositions, military extras were employed by smaller units according to each day's shooting schedule. Director of photography Geoffrey Unsworth used tree groves, which lined the coastal plain aside the lagoon, to hide the obvious deficiency in the number of troops that would have been amassed on the Persian side of the battle line.

Originally developed as an Italian sword-and-sandal project, the cooperation of the Greek government allowed the producers to complete the production on a budget of 500,000 GBP (equivalent to £9,332,242 in 2025) or around US$1,350,000 (equivalent to $14,368,812 in 2025), roughly twice the amount of contemporary Italian peplum films.

The 300 Spartans was the last film of Richard Egan's seven-year contract with 20th Century Fox. It was also the last film appearance of David Farrar, who retired from acting.

== Release ==
Release of the film was delayed.

The 300 Spartans was released in the United States in August 1962. Promotional campaigns often emphasized the scale of the battle scenes and the heroic sacrifice of the Spartans. Regional marketing materials included hyperbolic slogans such as “After 2½ thousand years… they marched on Utah, Idaho and Montana — and crocked them!” to boost local interest. The film performed moderately well at the box office and remained in circulation for years.

In 1970, despite the film's Cold War connotations, it was dubbed in Russian and shown in the Soviet Union. The film proved to be very popular, with 27.1 million total viewers.

== Reception ==
In a contemporary review for The New York Times, critic A.H. Weiler wrote: "In 'The 300 Spartans', filmed in glorious color in authentic settings in Greece and other areas abroad ... this historic highlight has become a standard melodrama. In its seemingly dedicated efforts, Twentieth Century-Fox, the producer, has come up with an Eastern Western that is plagued by an excess of stilted, stylized dialogue and a minimum of genuine, colorful action that recently has been typical of cinematic forays into our storied past... a viewer now can see by what means the Persians and the Greeks annihilated each other, but beyond that it is shallow stuff no more memorable than a weather report, dated 480 B.C."

== Other adaptions ==
- Comic book: Dell Movie Classic: Lion of Sparta (January 1963)
- Novelization: The 300 Spartans by John Burke, first printed in 1962

== Legacy ==
Frank Miller's 1998 graphic novel 300 also depicts the Battle of Thermopylae. Miller viewed The 300 Spartans as a boy and said, "it changed the course of my creative life." In 2006, his book was adapted into a successful film of the same name directed by Zack Snyder.

== See also ==
- List of American films of 1962
- List of historical drama films
- 300, 2006 film
- 300: Rise of an Empire, 2014 film
