= Immortals (Achaemenid Empire) =

Elite Persian heavy infantry

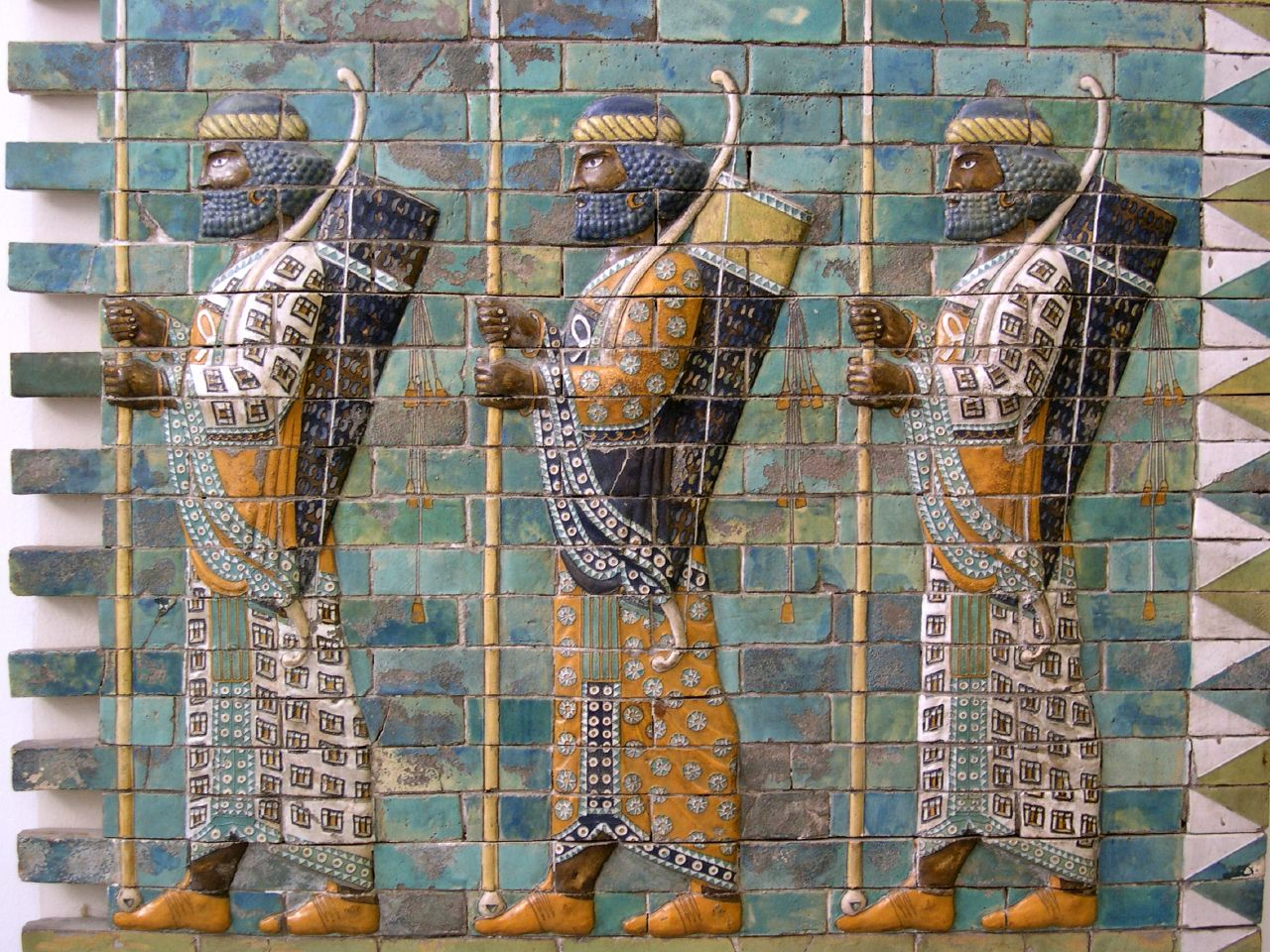
Depiction of the "Susian guards" from the Palace of Darius in Susa. Their garments match the description of the Immortals by ancient authors.

Immortals (Greek: Ἀθάνατοι, Athánatoi), or Persian Immortals, was the name given by the Greek historian Herodotus to a 10,000-strong unit of elite heavy infantry in the Achaemenid army. They served in a dual capacity, operating as an imperial guard and contributing to the ranks of the standing army. The force mainly consisted of Persians, along with Medes and Elamites. Essential questions regarding the unit's history and organization remain unanswered due to the lack of authoritative sources.

== Ancient Greek accounts ==
=== Herodotus ===
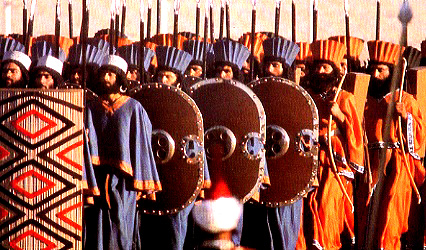
Modern interpretation of ceremonially dressed Immortals for the Celebration of the 2,500th Anniversary of the Founding of the Persian Empire, 1971

Herodotus describes the Immortals as heavy infantry led by the Persian military commander Hydarnes the Younger; they provided the professional corps of the Achaemenid army and numbered exactly 10,000 men. He stated that the unit's name stemmed from every dead, seriously wounded, or sick Immortal was immediately replaced with a new one, maintaining the corps as a cohesive entity with a constant strength.

=== Xenophon ===
Xenophon (Cyropaedia 6.4.1; 7.1.2) describes the guard of Cyrus the Great as having bronze breastplates and helmets, while their horses wore chamfrons and peitrels of bronze together with shoulder pieces that also protected the rider's thighs. However, according to Herodotus, they had wicker shields covered in leather, short spears, quivers, swords or large daggers, slings, and bows and arrows. They wore coats of scale armor. The spear counterbalances of the common soldiery were of silver; to differentiate commanding ranks, the officers' spear butt-spikes were of gold. The regiment was followed by a caravan of covered carriages, camels, and mules that transported their supplies, along with concubines and attendants to serve them; this supply train carried special food that was reserved only for their consumption.

The headdress worn by the Immortals is believed to have been a conical or rounded metal on top and scale or chains on the sides, resembling a ridge helmet or Phrygian cap; surviving Achaemenid coloured glazed bricks and carved reliefs represent the Immortals as wearing elaborate robes, hoop earrings, and gold jewellery, although these garments and accessories were most likely worn only for ceremonial occasions.

=== Comparison with Persian sources ===
The Persian denomination of the unit is uncertain. This elite force is only referred to as the "Immortals" in sources based on Herodotus. There is evidence from Persian sources of the existence of a permanent corps, which provided a backbone for the tribal levies (raised by satraps) who, together with increasing numbers of mercenaries, made up the bulk of the Achaemenid army. However these do not record the name of "Immortals"; it is suggested that Herodotus' informant confused the word anûšiya- (lit. 'companion') with anauša- (lit. 'immortal'), but this theory has been criticized by German linguist Rüdiger Schmitt.

== History ==
The Immortals played an important role in the Achaemenid conquest of Egypt under Cambyses II in 525 BCE, as well as in their conquest of the Indus Valley, (western Punjab, and Sindh, present-day Pakistan) and European Scythia conquest under Darius I in c. 518 BCE and 513 BCE, respectively. They also notably participated in the Battle of Thermopylae in 480 BCE during the Greco-Persian Wars and were amongst the Persian troops who occupied Greece in 479 BCE under Mardonius.

During the final decades of the Achaemenid Empire, the role expected of the Immortals' hazarapatish (lit. 'one thousand overseer') was extended to include that of chief minister to the King of Kings. The provision of a bodyguard, in direct attendance of the monarch, had already been allocated to a select thousand-strong detachment of the unit.

The Immortals played an important role in Cyrus the Great's conquest of Babylon, namely the Battle of Opis in 539 BCE. The well-established regiment were an elite corps of 10,000 heavy infantry and were important to the Persian triumph over the Babylonian forces. Their perceived "immortality" came from maintaining their full strength through immediate replacement of any soldier who died or fell ill in order to ensure a consistent and intimidating battlefield presence. The strong battle presence made them a huge force and central element of Cyrus's strategy and tactics.

According to Herodotus, the strategy at Opis adapted a lot of surprise attack to exploit Babylonian vulnerabilities with the Immortals' discipline. Their versatility in both ranged engagements, as well as close-quarter combat with their short spears, bow and small sword allowed Cyrus to maneuver them into breaching Babylonian lines, which also been seen in later in Thermopylae. Cook further supports this, stating that their rigorous training and discipline made them elite and the perfect choice to lead charges and anchor key defensive positions.

Despite the lack of direct description toward Immortals in the field, their prominence as the Persians' elite military unit implies a significant contribution. Scholars like Dandamaev and Vogelsang say that their involvement in foundational victories like in Opis reinforced their importance within the Achaemenid military framework.

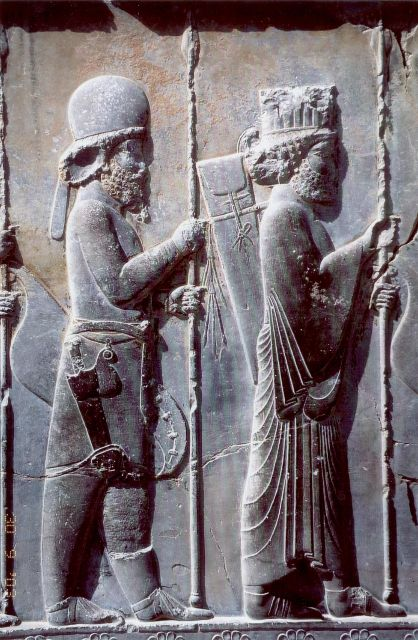
A Median (left) and a Persian (right), both in army ceremonial dress, depicted in ancient carvings at Persepolis. Some scholars speculate that these warriors represent the Immortals.

== Legacy ==
=== Achaemenid Empire ===
The Battle of Opis was a transformative moment for Cyrus the Great and his Achaemenid Empire as it initiated the ascendancy over Mesopotamia and marked the first step for the conquest of Babylon later. The Immortals' participation in Opis solidified their reputation as the empire's stalwart guardians, showing the elite military prowess and organizational replacement Achaemenid possessed. The fixed strength of 10,000 had fostered an image of invulnerability that amplified their psychological influences not only on both allies and foes, but also the Achaemenid empire image.

The legacy of Immortals from the Battle of Opis is deeply intertwined with their establishment as the foundational piece of the Achaemenid armed forces. Their success in early engagements there, had underpinned their continued greatness under later rulers like Cambyses, Darius the Great and Xerxes, their presence could also be found at Thermopylae and Gaugamela engagements. Their continued success at different battles helped the expansion of the empire. When the Immortals were not in combat, they acted as the palace guard that shaped the military traditions and reinforced their symbolic connection with Persian imperial authority.

=== Sasanian Empire ===
The first recurrence of the word "Immortals" is in Roman historians' description of an elite cavalry unit in the army of the Sasanian Empire. Primary sources suggest that they numbered around 10,000 men in accordance with tradition, with the main formational difference being that they were heavy cavalry. However, recent scholarship has doubted much of the Roman description, including their name, their size, and that they were modeled on the Achaemenid Immortals, although there may have been one or more of such distinct elite cavalry units during that period. Their task was mainly to secure any breakthroughs and to enter battles at crucial stages.

=== Byzantine Empire ===
The designation "Immortal" to describe a military unit was used twice during the era of the Byzantine Empire: first as elite heavy cavalry under John I Tzimiskes (r. 969–976) and then later under Nikephoritzes, the chief minister of Byzantine emperor Michael VII Doukas (r. 1071–1081), as the core of a new central field army following their defeat at Manzikert to the Seljuk Turks in 1071.

=== French Empire ===
During the 19th-century Napoleonic Wars, many French soldiers referred to Napoleon's Imperial Guard as "the Immortals".

=== Imperial State of Iran ===
Under Mohammad Reza Pahlavi, the last Shah of Iran, the Imperial Iranian Army included an all-volunteer known as the Javidan Guard (Persian: گارد جاویدان, romanized: Gârd-e Jâvidân, lit. 'Immortal Guard'), named after the ancient Persian royal guard. The Javidan Guard was based at the Lavizan Barracks in Tehran. By 1978, this elite force comprised a brigade of 4,000–5,000 men, including a battalion of Chieftain tanks. Following the 1979 Islamic revolution that ended the Imperial State of Iran and the Pahlavi dynasty, the "Immortal Guard" was disbanded.

== Equipment and tactics ==
=== Equipment ===
The Immortals display of wealth impressed Greek and Roman authors. Herodotus noted that they showed off all the richest adornment by Persian, and over and above this they made a brave show, with the abundance of gold that they had. Quintus Curtius Rufus also remarked that they were "above all who were made imposing by an unheard-of luxury of opulence, they wore gold necklaces, gold-embroidered robes and the sleeved tunics which were also adorned with gems".

Aelianus adds that the robes were purple and yellow, and Alexander the Great kept and used them in his service after he conquered the Achaemenids because of their impressive appearance. Their depictions were found in the enameled brickwork of the Apadana hall in the palace of Darius I. Dressed in the regiment's uniform that consisted of a felt diadem or bandana (a broad tunic), with embroidery, trousers and chain mail, though these were least likely to be worn in combat and only appeared in formal occasion.

As for the actual armament of the Immortals, they wore an embroidered tunic with sleeves that overlaid with a coat of scale armor that "looked like the scales of a fish". The metal-made armor provided significant protection. Their headgear were a typical Persian tiara and a soft felt cap, on their feet were strapped shoes and boots. However, their primary defensive equipment was a large, wicker, leather shield. The tall and rectangular shield could be planted in the ground for cover and to stop arrows. Based on need, the Immortals could also be equipped with a figure-8 boeotian shield for better mobility.

Offensively, the Immortals had several weapons at their disposal. While at range, they carried powerful bows with cane and reed arrows in quivers to emphasize their archery capabilities and as a hallmark of Persian warfare. In close combat, they had a short spear with an iron, butt-spike tip, where higher rank commanders had gold while common soldiers had it in silver, to highlight the status differentiation. According to Herodotus, it is the most symbolic weapon for them. Finally, the Immortals would also have a small, short sword, the Acinaces, as a secondary option.

=== Tactics ===
Being elite heavy infantry, the tactics of the Immortals involved heavy infantry formations where they used their bows, short spears, swords and wicker shields, while striking a balance between mobility and protection. They adapted tight phalanx-like formations that were somewhat similar to Greek, but they focused more on adaptability. Frontline units would cover themselves with their shields, and would get ranged support from the Immortals' archers from behind or could cooperate with other military units to first penetrate the enemy's frontline, then engage into close combat with their swords and spears.

== In popular culture ==
Herodotus' account of two warrior elites—the hoplites of Sparta and the Immortals of Persia—facing each other in battle has inspired a set of fanciful depictions of the battle, especially with regard to the Immortals:

- In the 1962 film The 300 Spartans, the Immortals carry a spear and wicker shields like the actual Immortals. However, they are mostly dressed in black and other dark colors in contrast to historical depictions.
- Frank Miller's 1998 comic book 300 and the 2006 feature film adapted from it present a heavily fictionalized version of the Immortals at the Battle of Thermopylae in 480 BCE. These Immortals wear Mengu-style metal masks, appear to be inhuman or disfigured, and carry a pair of swords closely resembling Japanese wakizashis. The Immortals are also featured in the sequel film, 300: Rise of an Empire.
- The Immortals also appears in the film Meet the Spartans that is mainly a parody of the film 300.
- The History Channel's 2007 film Last Stand of the 300 also features the Immortals as part of the reconstruction of the historic battle at Thermopylae in ancient Greece. In this version, the Persian tiara that the Immortals habitually wore is depicted as a full-face black cloth mask transparent enough to see through.
- The second season of the show Deadliest Warrior featured the Persian Immortals in a simulated match-up against Celtic warriors. The Immortals were found to be victorious.
- In the video game Prince of Persia: The Lost Crown, the protagonist Sargon is part of an elite group called The Immortals, who in the game serve as soldiers in the Persian army as well as bodyguards to the royal family, including the titular prince.
- In the Civilization series, Immortals appear as a unique unit for Persia in the Antiquity Era. This unit heals themselves after defeating another unit.

== See also ==
- History of Iran
- Military history of Iran

== Sources ==
- Hicks, Jim (1975). The Persians. Time-Life Books. ISBN 9780809412983.
- Lendering, John (1997). ""Immortals"". Livius.
- Schmitt, Rüdiger (2004). "Immortals". Encyclopaedia Iranica.
