= Megistias =

5th century BC Greek soothsayer

Megistias (Greek: Μεγιστίας, "the greatest one") or Themisteas (Greek: Θεμιστέας) was a soothsayer from Acarnania who voluntarily followed the Greeks to Thermopylae, along with his son. He traced his lineage to Melampus. On the last day of the Battle of Thermopylae, after the decision had been made for the retreat of the other Greeks (except for the Spartans, Thespians, and Thebans), Megistias sent his only son away with them and chose to stay until the end. The Acarnanians erected a monument in his honor, on which they praised, with an epigram that was written by Simonides of Ceos, a personal friend of Megistias, to honor his courage and self-sacrifice.

== In popular culture ==
In the 1962 movie The 300 Spartans, Megistias appears as a Spartan priest and soothsayer and friend of King Leonidas who, in addition to giving predictions, also acts as a physician for the Spartans at Thermopylae. Megistias was portrayed by Charles Fernley Fawcett.
