= Kolonos Hill =

Hill in Central Greece

Coordinates: 38.795981°N 22.539053°E

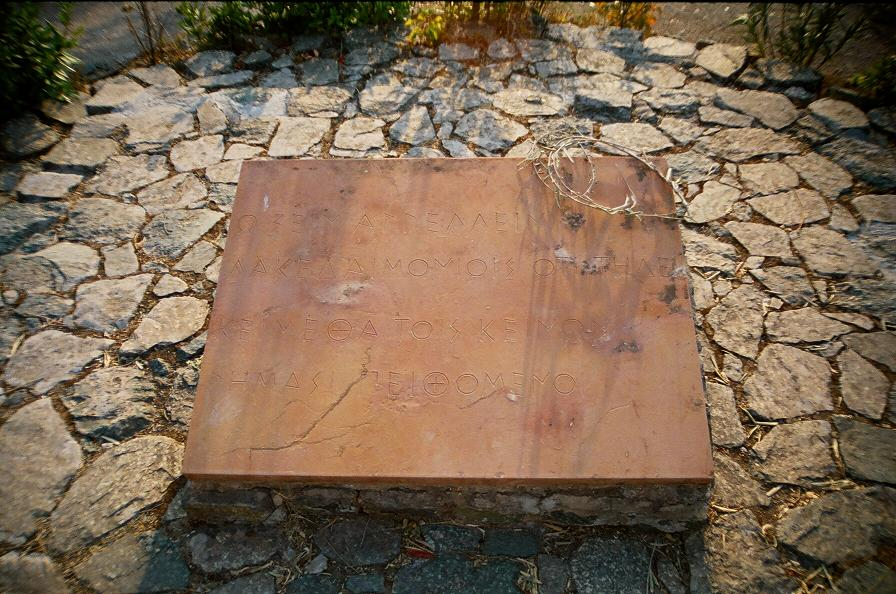
Commemorative stone with the epigram ascribed to Simonides

Kolonos Hill (/kəˈloʊnɒs/; Greek: Λόφος Κολωνού) is a hill in Central Greece. It is located in the narrow coastal passage known as Thermopylae, and is near the city of Lamia.

== History ==
The hill is best known as the site of the final stand of the 300 Spartans during the Battle of Thermopylae in 480 BC. In 1939, Spyridon Marinatos, a Greek archaeologist found large numbers of Persian arrows around the hill, which changed the hitherto accepted identification of the site where the Greeks had fallen, slain by Persian arrows.

A commemorative stone was placed on the site in antiquity, but the original stone has not survived. In 1955, a new stone was erected, with the epigram from the original, traditionally attributed to Simonides, engraved on it as follows:

Ὦ ξεῖν', ἀγγέλλειν Λακεδαιμονίοις ὅτι τῇδε
κείμεθα, τοῖς κείνων ῥήμασι πειθόμενοι.

Translation:

Tell them in Lacedaemon, passer-by
That here, obedient to their word, we lie,

— Translated by F. L. Lucas
as an English heroic couplet
