= Demophilus of Thespiae =

Greek officer at Battle of Thermopylae, 480 BC

Demophilus
- Δημόφιλος
- Born: Thespiae
- Died: 480 BC; Thermopylae
- Relatives: Diadromes (father)
- Military career
- Allegiance: Thespiae
- Rank: Commander
- Conflicts: Battle of Thermopylae
- Memorials: At Thermopylae and Thespiae

Demophilus (Greek: Δημόφιλος Demophilos), according to Herodotus, was the commander of a contingent of 700 Thespians at the Battle of Thermopylae (480 BC). His father was Diadromes (Διαδρόμης).

Demophilus and his men fought at the battle and at the end they stood along with the 300 Spartans at the last stand, all were killed. The ancient Greek traveler and geographer Pausanias also wrote about the stay of the Thespians at Thermopylae together with the Spartans.

After the Battle of Thermopylae, the Persian army burned down the city of Thespiae. The citizens had fled to the Peloponnese. Later, the Thespians fought against the Persian army at the Battle of Plataea (479 BC).

Demophilos is immortalised in many books and movies. In the 1962 movie The 300 Spartans, Demophilus was portrayed by the Greek actor Yorgos (George) Moutsios.

In Thermopylae, there is a monument in memory of him and his men; it is next to the monument of Leonidas. There is also a monument to Demophilus in the modern Thespies.
