= Hydarnes the Younger =

5th-century BCE Persian military commander

Hydarnes II (Old Persian: 𐎻𐎡𐎭𐎼𐎴, romanized: Vidṛna), also known as Hydarnes the Younger (by contrast with his father Hydarnes the Old) was a Persian commander of the Achaemenid Empire in the 5th century BC. He was the son of Hydarnes, satrap of the Persian empire and one of the seven conspirators against Gaumata.

During the reign of Xerxes I, Hydarnes was one of the commanders of the second Persian invasion of Greece in 480 BC. He was appointed the leader of the 10,000-man contingent of "Immortals", while his brother Sisamnes commanded the levy of the Aryans.

On the first day of the Battle of Thermopylae, Hydarnes led the Immortals against the phalanx of Spartans under Leonidas I, but an attempt to break through failed. On the second day, a local resident named Ephialtes betrayed the Greeks by telling the Persians about a hidden goat path around Thermopylae. This enabled Hydarnes and his Immortals to pass behind the Spartans, Thespians and Thebans and, as a result, defeat them.

After the Persians were defeated at the Battle of Salamis, Xerxes I decided to return to Asia leaving a large army under Mardonius which wintered in Thessaly. Hydarnes wanted to stay at the side of the king and go back with him to Asia. So Xerxes tasked Hydarnes with the responsibility of getting the Persian army back over the Hellespont to Asia. After this, nothing further is reported about Hydarnes.

Another Hydarnes, who was active during the reign of Darius II (r. 423–404 BC), was a descendant (perhaps grandson) of Hydarnes the Younger.

== Sources ==
- Briant, Pierre (2002). From Cyrus to Alexander: A History of the Persian Empire. Eisenbrauns. ISBN 978-1575060316.
- Schmitt, Rüdiger (2004). "Hydarnes". In Yarshater, Ehsan (ed.). Encyclopædia Iranica. Vol. XII/6: Human migration II–Illuminationism. London and New York: Routledge & Kegan Paul. pp. 588–590. ISBN 978-0-933273-80-1.
