= Battle of Thermopylae =

480 BC engagement of the Greco-Persian Wars

- Part of the Greco-Persian Wars
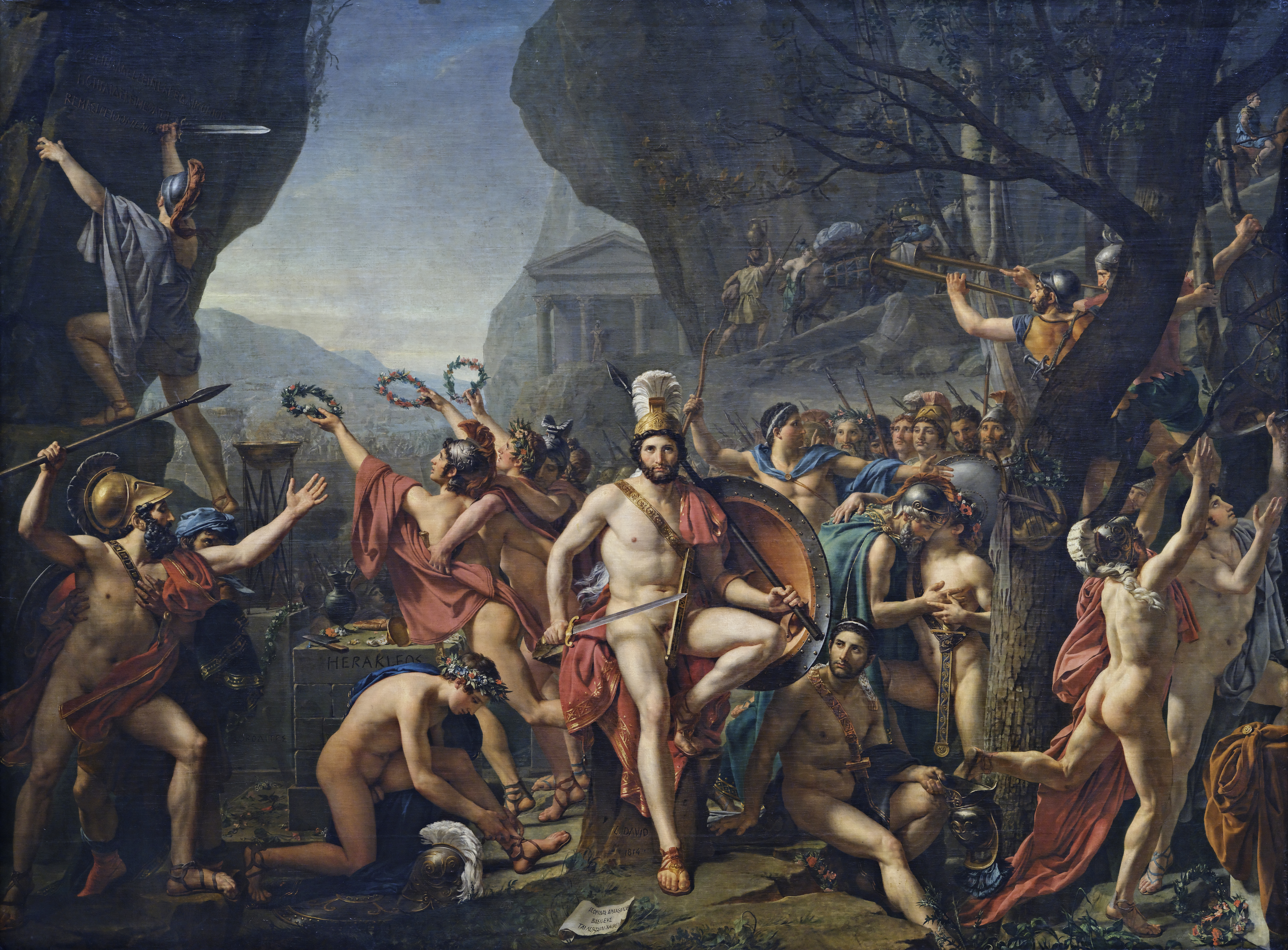
- Leonidas at Thermopylae; Jacques-Louis David, 1814
Date	21–23 July, 20 August or 8–10 September 480 BC
Location	Thermopylae, Greece 38°47′45″N 22°32′13″E
Result	Persian victory (Note: Although some authors state the result was a pyrrhic victory for Persia, the majority of authors do not apply this label to the result. See § Aftermath.)
Territorial changes	Persia gains control of Phocis, Boeotia, and Attica

Belligerents
Allied Greek city-states • Sparta • Thespiae • Thebes • Others	Achaemenid Empire

Commanders and leaders
Leonidas I of Sparta †; Demophilus of Thespiae †; Leontiades of Thebes (surrendered)	Xerxes; Mardonius; Hydarnes; Artapanus

Units involved
Spartan army: Helots; Other Greek forces	Persian army

Strength
7,700	40,000–300,000 (Note: A huge number of estimates have been made since the 19th century, ranging from 15,000 to acceptance of Herodotus's 1,800,000. No real consensus exists, although the most recent estimates by academics vary between 120,000 and 300,000.)

Casualties and losses
4,000 (Herodotus)	c. 20,000 (Herodotus)
- Location of Thermopylae within present-day Greece Location of Thermopylae within Europe

The Battle of Thermopylae (/θərˈmɒpɪliː/) was fought in 480 BC at Thermopylae between the Achaemenid Persian Empire under Xerxes and an alliance of Greek city-states led by Sparta under Leonidas I. Lasting over the course of three days, it was one of the most prominent battles of both the second Persian invasion of Greece and the wider Greco-Persian Wars.

The engagement occurred simultaneously with the naval Battle of Artemisium: between July and September during 480 BC. The second Persian invasion under Xerxes was a delayed response to the failure of the first Persian invasion, which had been initiated by Darius I and ended in 490 BC by an Athenian-led Greek victory at the Battle of Marathon. By 480 BC, a decade after the Persian defeat at Marathon, Xerxes had amassed a massive land and naval force, and subsequently set out to conquer all of Greece. In response, the Athenian politician and general Themistocles proposed that the allied Greeks block the advance of the Persian army at the pass of Thermopylae while simultaneously blocking the Persian navy at the Straits of Artemisium.

Around the start of the invasion, a Greek force of approximately 7,000 men – including an estimated 300 Spartans – led by Leonidas marched north to block the pass of Thermopylae. Ancient authors vastly inflated the size of the Persian army, with estimates in the millions, but modern scholars estimate it at between 120,000 and 300,000 soldiers. They arrived at Thermopylae by late August or early September; the outnumbered Greeks held them off for seven days (including three of direct battle) before their rear-guard was annihilated in one of the most famous last stands in history. During two full days of battle, the Greeks blocked the only road by which the massive Persian army could traverse the narrow pass. After the second day, a local resident named Ephialtes revealed to the Persians the existence of a path leading behind the Greek lines. Subsequently, Leonidas, aware that his force was being outflanked by the Persians, dismissed the bulk of the Greek army and remained to guard their retreat along with 300 Spartans and 700 Thespians. It has been reported that others also remained, including up to 900 helots and 400 Thebans. With the exception of the Thebans, most of whom reportedly surrendered, the Greeks fought the Persians to the death.

Themistocles was in command of the Greek naval force at Artemisium when he received news that the Persians had taken the pass at Thermopylae. Since the Greek defensive strategy had required both Thermopylae and Artemisium to be held, the decision was made to withdraw to the island of Salamis. The Persians overran Boeotia and then captured the evacuated city of Athens. The Greek fleet—seeking a decisive victory over the Persian armada—attacked and defeated the invading force at the Battle of Salamis in late 480 BC. Wary of being trapped in Europe, Xerxes withdrew with much of his army to Asia, reportedly losing many of his troops to starvation and disease while also leaving behind the Persian military commander Mardonius to continue the Achaemenid Empire's Greek campaign. However, the following year saw a Greek army decisively defeat Mardonius and his troops at the Battle of Plataea, ending the second Persian invasion.

Both ancient and modern writers have used the Battle of Thermopylae as a flagship example of the power of an army defending its native soil. The performance of the Greek defenders is also used as an example of the advantages of training, equipment, and use of terrain as force multipliers.

== Sources ==
The primary source for the Graeco-Persian Wars is the Greek historian Herodotus. The Sicilian historian Diodorus Siculus, writing in the 1st century BC in his Bibliotheca historica, also provides an account of the Graeco-Persian Wars, partially derived from the earlier Greek historian Ephorus. Diodorus is fairly consistent with Herodotus's writings. These wars are also described in less detail by a number of other ancient historians including Plutarch, Ctesias of Cnidus, and are referred to by other authors, as by Aeschylus in The Persians.

Archaeological evidence, such as the Serpent Column (now in the Hippodrome of Constantinople), also supports some of Herodotus's specific reports. George B. Grundy was the first modern historian to do a thorough topographical survey of Thermopylae, and led some modern writers (such as Liddell Hart) to revise their views of certain aspects of the battle. Grundy also explored Plataea and wrote a treatise on that battle.

On the Battle of Thermopylae itself, two principal sources, Herodotus's and Simonides's accounts, survive. Herodotus's account in Book VII of his Histories is such an important source that Paul Cartledge wrote: "we either write a history of Thermopylae with [Herodotus], or not at all". Also surviving is an epitome of the account of Ctesias, by the eighth-century Byzantine Photios, though this is "almost worse than useless", missing key events in the battle such as the betrayal of Ephialtes, and the account of Diodorus Siculus in his Universal History. Diodorus seems to have based his account on that of Ephorus and contains one significant deviation from Herodotus's account: a supposed night attack against the Persian camp, of which modern scholars have tended to be skeptical.

== Background ==
Map of Greece during the Persian Wars from the Ionian Revolt.

The city-states of Athens and Eretria had aided the unsuccessful Ionian Revolt against the Persian Empire of Darius I in 499–494 BC. The Persian Empire was still relatively young and prone to revolts amongst its subject peoples. Darius, moreover, was a usurper and had spent considerable time extinguishing revolts against his rule.

The Ionian revolt threatened the integrity of his empire, and Darius thus vowed to punish those involved, especially the Athenians, "since he was sure that [the Ionians] would not go unpunished for their rebellion". Darius also saw the opportunity to expand his empire into the fractious world of Ancient Greece. A preliminary expedition under Mardonius in 492 BC secured the lands approaching Greece, re-conquered Thrace, and forced Macedon to become a client kingdom of Persia.

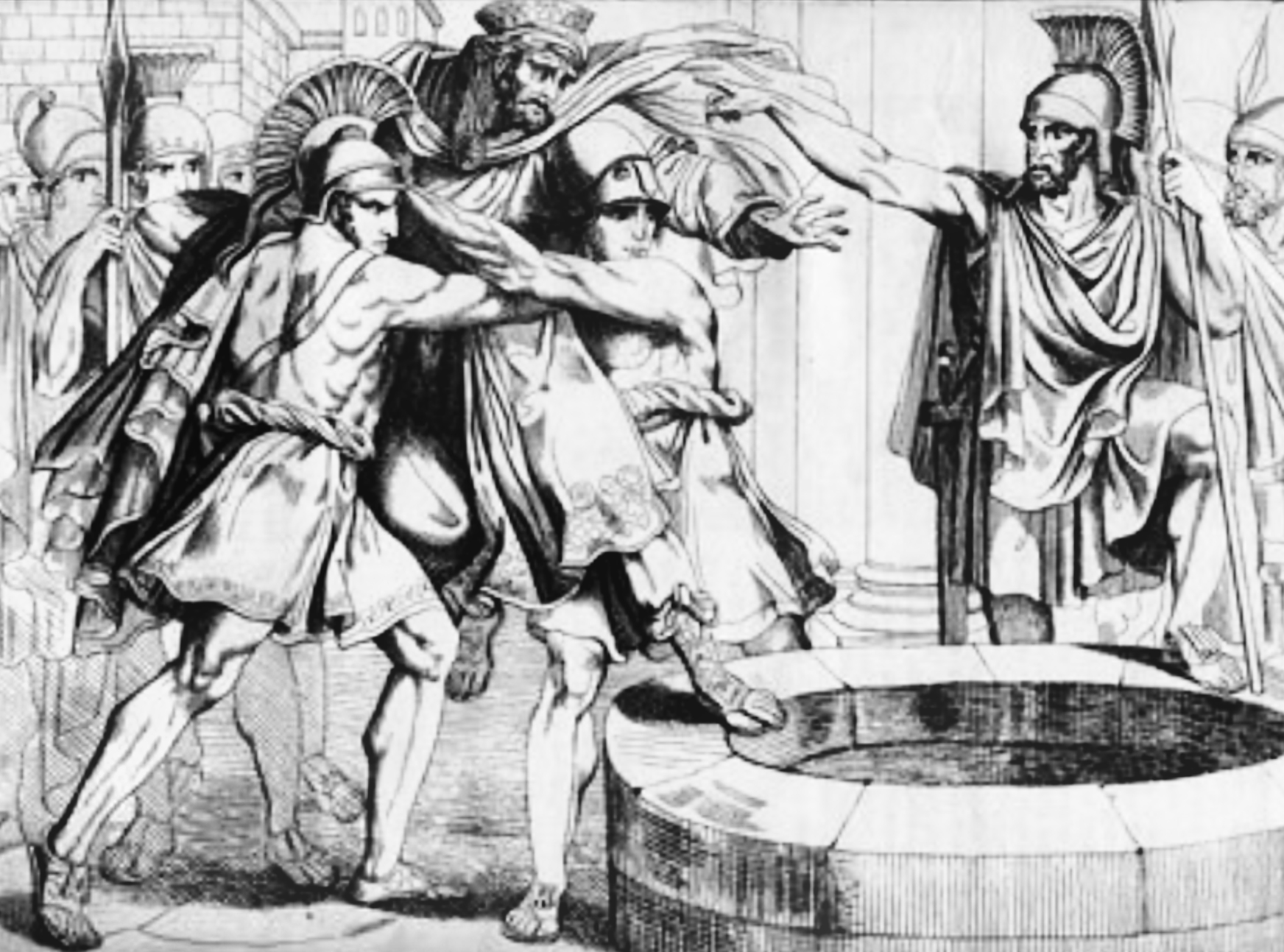
The Spartans throw Persian envoys into a well

Darius sent emissaries to all the Greek city-states in 491 BC asking for a gift of "earth and water" as tokens of their submission to him. Having had a demonstration of his power the previous year, the majority of Greek cities duly obliged. In Athens, however, the ambassadors were put on trial and then executed by throwing them in a pit; in Sparta, they were simply thrown down a well. This meant that Sparta was also effectively at war with Persia. However, in order to appease the Persian king somewhat, two Spartans were voluntarily sent to Susa for execution, in atonement for the death of the Persian heralds.

Darius then launched an amphibious expeditionary force under Datis and Artaphernes in 490 BC, which attacked Naxos before receiving the submission of the other Cycladic Islands. It then besieged and destroyed Eretria. Finally, it moved to attack Athens, landing at the bay of Marathon, where it was met by a heavily outnumbered Athenian army. At the ensuing Battle of Marathon, the Athenians won a remarkable victory, which resulted in the withdrawal of the Persian army to Asia.

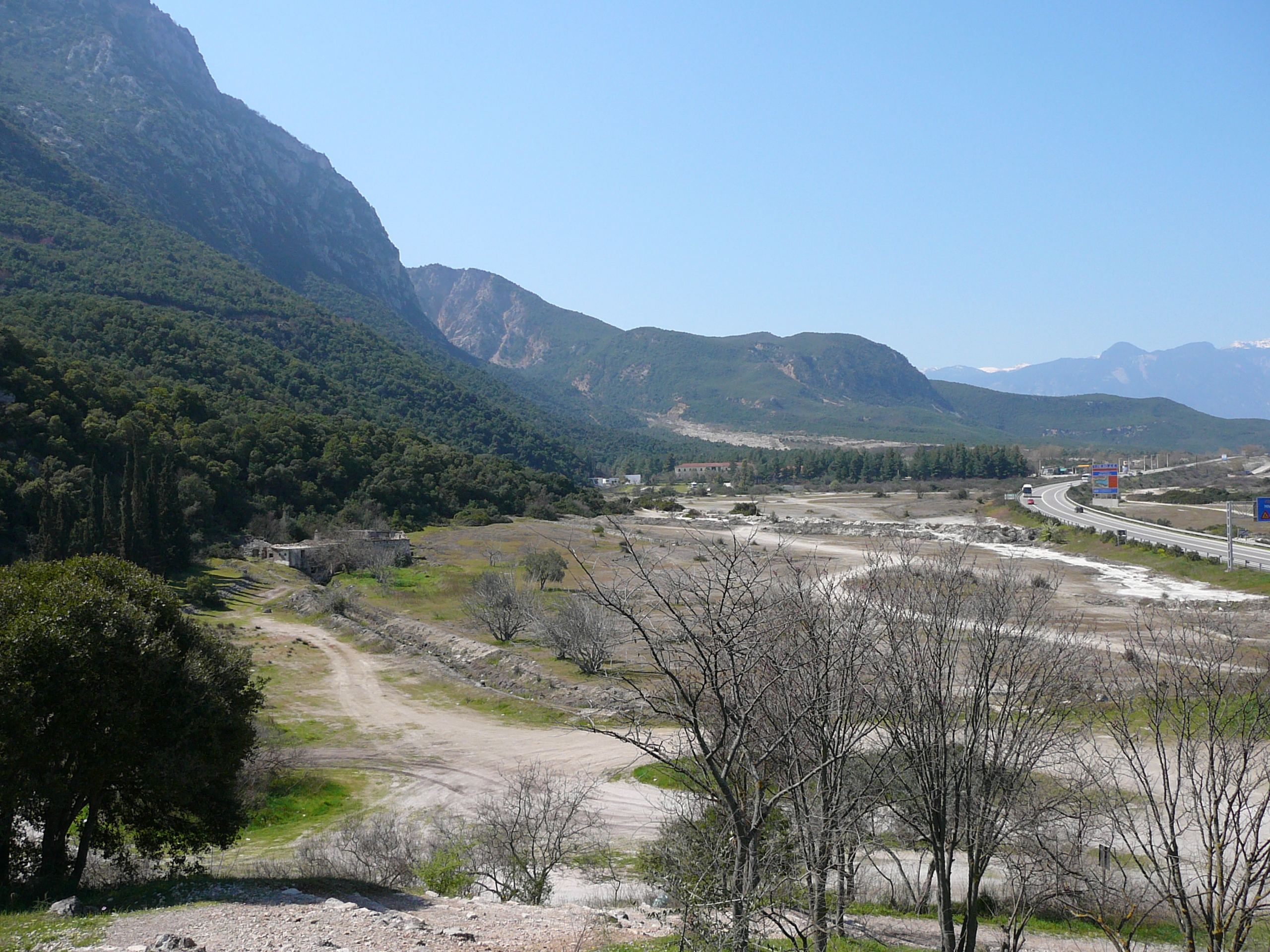
The site of the battle today. Mount Kallidromon on the left, and the wide coastal plain formed by accretion of fluvial deposits over the centuries; the road to the right approximates the 480 BC shoreline.

At this, Darius began raising a huge new army with which to completely subjugate Greece; however, in 486 BC, his Egyptian province revolted, indefinitely postponing any Greek expedition. Darius died while preparing to march on Egypt, and the throne of Persia passed to his son Xerxes. Xerxes crushed the Egyptian revolt and quickly restarted preparations for the invasion of Greece. No mere expedition, this was to be a full-scale invasion supported by long-term planning, stockpiling, and conscription. Xerxes directed that the Hellespont be bridged to allow his army to cross to Europe, and that a canal be dug across the isthmus of Mount Athos (cutting short the route where a Persian fleet had been destroyed in 492 BC). These were both feats of exceptional ambition beyond any other contemporary state. By early 480 BC, the preparations were complete, and the army which Xerxes had mustered at Sardis marched towards Europe, crossing the Hellespont on two pontoon bridges. According to Herodotus, Xerxes's army was so large that, upon arriving at the banks of the Echeidorus River, his soldiers proceeded to drink it dry. In the face of such imposing numbers, many Greek cities capitulated to the Persian demand for a tribute of earth and water.

The Athenians had also been preparing for war with the Persians since the mid-480s BC, and in 482 BC the decision was taken, under the strategic guidance of the Athenian politician Themistocles, to build a massive fleet of triremes to resist the Persians. However, the Athenians lacked the manpower to fight on both land and sea, requiring reinforcements from other Greek city-states. In 481 BC, Xerxes sent ambassadors around Greece requesting "earth and water" but very deliberately omitting Athens and Sparta. Support thus began to coalesce around these two leading cities. A congress met at Corinth in late autumn of 481 BC, and a confederate alliance of Greek city-states was formed. It had the power to send envoys to request assistance and dispatch troops from the member states to defensive points, after joint consultation. This was remarkable for the disjointed and chaotic Greek world, especially since many of the supposed allies were still technically at war with each other.

The congress met again in the spring of 480 BC. A Thessalian delegation suggested that the Greeks could muster in the narrow Vale of Tempe, on the borders of Thessaly, and thereby block Xerxes's advance. A force of 10,000 hoplites was dispatched to the Vale of Tempe, through which they believed the Persian army would have to pass. However, once there, being warned by Alexander I of Macedon that the vale could be bypassed through Sarantoporo Pass and that Xerxes's army was overwhelming, the Greeks retreated. Shortly afterwards, they received the news that Xerxes had crossed the Hellespont.

Themistocles, therefore, suggested a second strategy to the Greeks: the route to southern Greece (Boeotia, Attica, and the Peloponnesus) would require Xerxes's army to travel through the very narrow pass of Thermopylae, which could easily be blocked by the Greek hoplites, jamming up the overwhelming force of Persians. Furthermore, to prevent the Persians from bypassing Thermopylae by sea, the Athenian and allied navies could block the straits of Artemisium. Congress adopted this dual-pronged strategy. However, in case of Persian breakthrough, the Peloponnesian cities made fall-back plans to defend the Isthmus of Corinth, while the women and children of Athens would evacuate en masse to the Peloponnesian city of Troezen.

== Prelude ==
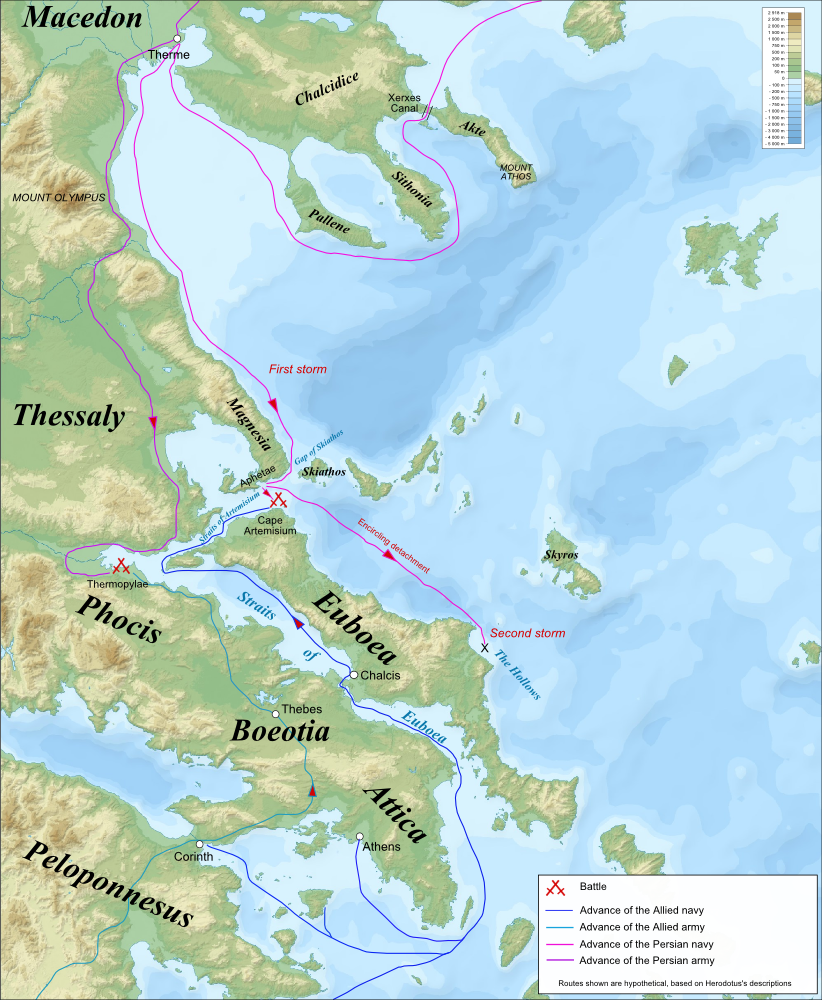
Map showing Greek and Persian advances to Thermopylae and Artemisium

The Persian army seems to have made slow progress through Thrace and Macedon. News of the imminent Persian approach eventually reached Greece in August thanks to a Greek spy. At this time of the year, the Spartans, de facto military leaders of the alliance, were celebrating the festival of Carneia. During the Carneia, military activity was forbidden by Spartan law; the Spartans had arrived too late at the Battle of Marathon because of this requirement. It was also the time of the Olympic Games, and therefore the Olympic truce, and thus it would have been doubly sacrilegious for the whole Spartan army to march to war. On this occasion, the ephors decided the urgency was sufficiently great to justify an advance expedition to block the pass, under one of its kings, Leonidas I. Leonidas took with him the 300 men of the royal bodyguard, the Hippeis. This expedition was to try to gather as many other Greek soldiers along the way as possible and to await the arrival of the main Spartan army.

The renowned account of the Battle of Thermopylae, as documented by Herodotus, includes a significant consultation with the Oracle at Delphi. It is said that the Oracle delivered a prophetic message to the Spartans, foretelling the impending conflict:

Hear your fate, O dwellers in Sparta of the wide spaces;
Either your famed, great town must be sacked by Perseus's sons,
Or, if that be not, the whole land of Lacedaemon
Shall mourn the death of a king of the house of Heracles,
For not the strength of lions or of bulls shall hold him,
Strength against strength, for he has the power of Zeus,
And will not be checked till one of these two he has consumed.

— The Oracle at Delphi, in The Histories by Herodotus, translated by Aubrey de Selincourt, revised by John Marincola

Herodotus tells us that Leonidas, in line with the prophecy, was convinced he was going to certain death since his forces were not adequate for a victory, and so he selected only Spartans with living sons.

The Spartan force was reinforced en route to Thermopylae by contingents from various cities and numbered more than 7,000 by the time it arrived at the pass. Leonidas chose to camp at, and defend, the "middle gate", the narrowest part of the pass of Thermopylae, where the Phocians had built a defensive wall some time before. News also reached Leonidas, from the nearby city of Trachis, that there was a mountain track that could be used to outflank the pass of Thermopylae. Leonidas stationed 1,000 Phocians on the heights to prevent such a manoeuvre.

Finally, in mid-August, the Persian army was sighted across the Malian Gulf approaching Thermopylae. With the Persian army's arrival at Thermopylae the Greeks held a council of war. Some Peloponnesians suggested withdrawal to the Isthmus of Corinth and blocking the passage to Peloponnesus. The Phocians and Locrians, whose states were located nearby, became indignant and advised defending Thermopylae and sending for more help. Leonidas calmed the panic and agreed to defend Thermopylae. According to Plutarch, when one of the soldiers complained that, "Because of the arrows of the barbarians it is impossible to see the sun", Leonidas replied, "Won't it be nice, then, if we shall have shade in which to fight them?" Herodotus reports a similar comment, but attributes it to Dienekes.

Xerxes sent a Persian emissary to negotiate with Leonidas. The Greeks were offered their freedom, the title "Friends of the Persian People", and the opportunity to re-settle on land better than that they possessed. When Leonidas refused these terms, the ambassador carried a written message by Xerxes, asking him to "Hand over your arms". Leonidas's famous response to the Persians was "Molṑn labé" (Μολὼν λαβέ – literally, "having come, take [them]", but usually translated as "come and take them"). With the Persian emissary returning empty-handed, battle became inevitable. Xerxes delayed for four days, waiting for the Greeks to disperse, before sending troops to attack them.

== Opposing forces ==
=== Persian army ===
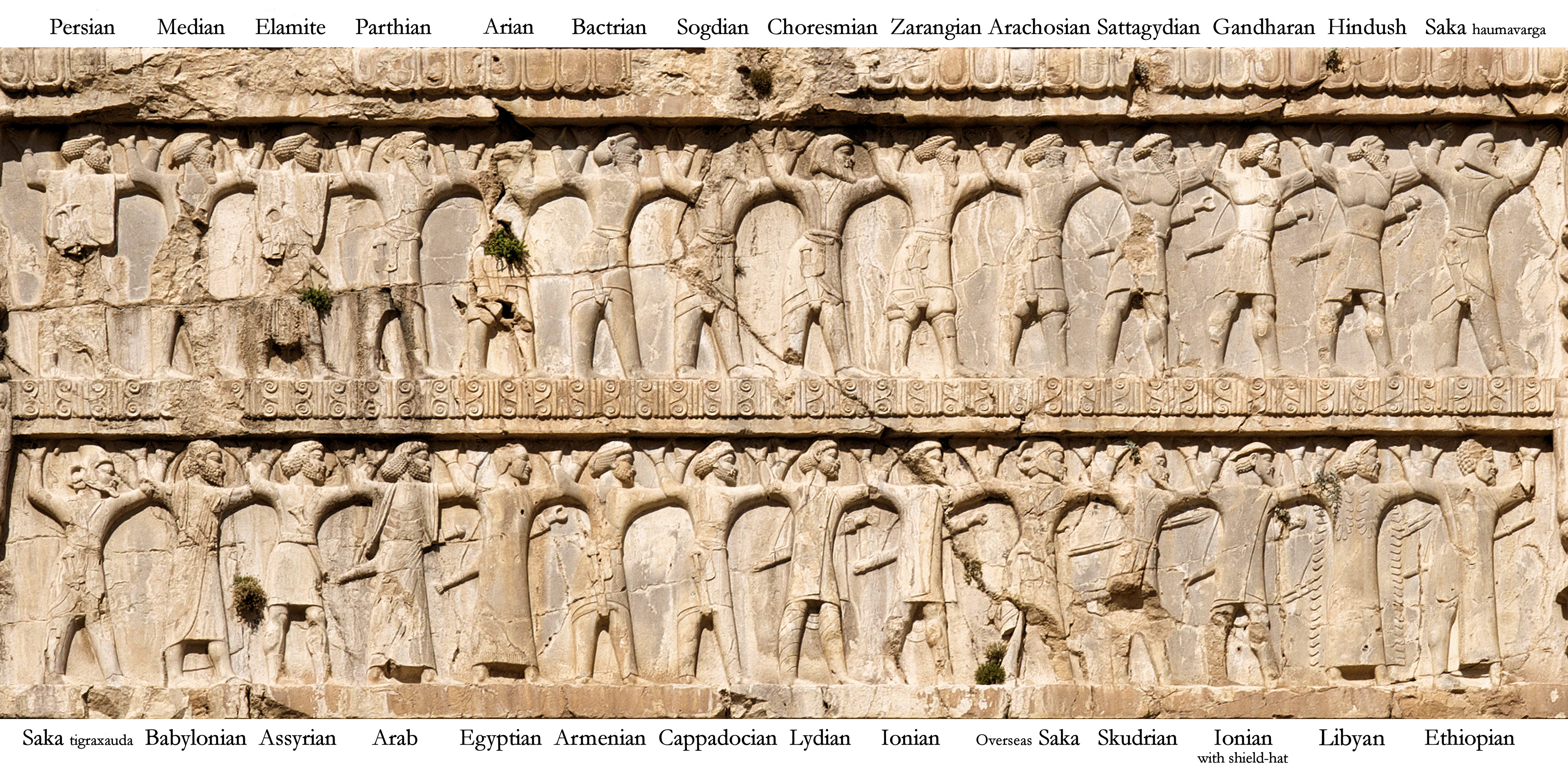
Soldiers of the Achaemenid army of Xerxes at the time of the Battle of Thermopylae. Tomb of Xerxes, circa 480 BC, Naqsh-e Rustam. Top rank: Persian, Median, Elamite, Parthian, Arian, Bactrian, Sogdian, Chorasmian, Zarangian, Sattagydian, Gandharan, Hindush (Indians), Scythian. Bottom rank: Scythian, Babylonian, Assyrian, Arabian, Egyptian, Armenian, Cappadocian, Lydian, Ionian, Scythian, Thracian, Macedonian, Libyan, Ethiopian.

The number of troops which Xerxes mustered for the second invasion of Greece has been the subject of endless dispute, most notably between ancient sources, which report very large numbers, and modern scholars, who surmise much smaller figures. Herodotus claimed that there were, in total, 2.6 million military personnel, accompanied by an equivalent number of support personnel. The poet Simonides, who was a contemporary, talks of four million; Ctesias gave 800,000 as the total number of the army that was assembled by Xerxes.

Modern scholars tend to reject the figures given by Herodotus and other ancient sources as unrealistic, resulting from miscalculations or exaggerations on the part of the victors. Modern scholarly estimates are generally in the range 120,000 to 300,000. Robert von fischer has estimated the size of Xerxes' army at 40,000 troops. And Hans has estimated 65,000 soldier.These estimates usually come from studying the logistical capabilities of the Persians in that era, the sustainability of their respective bases of operations, and the overall manpower constraints affecting them. Whatever the real numbers were, however, it is clear that Xerxes was anxious to ensure a successful expedition by mustering an overwhelming numerical superiority by land and by sea. The number of Persian troops present at Thermopylae is therefore as uncertain as the number for the total invasion force. For instance, it is unclear whether the whole Persian army marched as far as Thermopylae, or whether Xerxes left garrisons in Macedon and Thessaly.

=== Greek army ===
According to Herodotus and Diodorus Siculus, the Greek army included the following forces:

Group	Number – Herodotus	Numbers – Diodorus Siculus
Lacedaemonians/ Perioeci	900?	700 or 1,000
Spartan hoplites	300	300
Mantineans	500	3,000 (other Peloponnesians sent with Leonidas)
Tegeans	500	3,000 (other Peloponnesians sent with Leonidas)
Arcadian Orchomenos	120	3,000 (other Peloponnesians sent with Leonidas)
Other Arcadians	1,000	3,000 (other Peloponnesians sent with Leonidas)
Corinthians	400	3,000 (other Peloponnesians sent with Leonidas)
Phlians	200	3,000 (other Peloponnesians sent with Leonidas)
Mycenaeans	80	3,000 (other Peloponnesians sent with Leonidas)
Total Peloponnesians	3,100 or 4,000	4,000 or 4,300
Thespians	700	–
Malians	–	1,000
Thebans	400	400
Phocians	1,000	1,000
Opuntian Locrians	"All they had"	1,000
Grand total	5,200 (or 6,100) plus the Opuntian Locrians	7,400 (or 7,700)

Notes:

- The number of Peloponnesians

Diodorus suggests that there were 1,000 Lacedemonians and 3,000 other Peloponnesians, totalling 4,000. Herodotus agrees with this figure in one passage, quoting an inscription by Simonides saying there were 4,000 Peloponnesians. However, elsewhere, in the passage summarised by the above table, Herodotus tallies 3,100 Peloponnesians at Thermopylae before the battle. Herodotus also reports that at Xerxes's public showing of the dead, "helots were also there for them to see", but he does not say how many or in what capacity they served. Thus, the difference between his two figures can be squared by supposing (without proof) that there were 900 helots (three per Spartan) present at the battle. If helots were present at the battle, there is no reason to doubt that they served in their traditional role as armed retainers to individual Spartans. Alternatively, Herodotus's missing 900 troops might have been Perioeci, and could therefore correspond to Diodorus's 1,000 Lacedemonians.

- The number of Lacedemonians

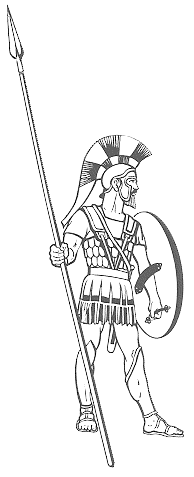
A modern recreation of a hoplite

Further confusing the issue is Diodorus's ambiguity about whether his count of 1,000 Lacedemonians included the 300 Spartans. At one point he says: "Leonidas, when he received the appointment, announced that only one thousand men should follow him on the campaign". However, he then says: "There were, then, of the Lacedemonians one thousand, and with them three hundred Spartiates". It is therefore impossible to be clearer on this point.

Pausanias's account agrees with that of Herodotus (whom he probably read) except that he gives the number of Locrians, which Herodotus declined to estimate. Residing in the direct path of the Persian advance, they gave all the fighting men they had – according to Pausanias 6,000 men – which added to Herodotus's 5,200 would have given a force of 11,200.

Many modern historians, who usually consider Herodotus more reliable, add the 1,000 Lacedemonians and the 900 helots to Herodotus's 5,200 to obtain 7,100 or about 7,000 men as a standard number, neglecting Diodorus's Melians and Pausanias's Locrians. However, this is only one approach, and many other combinations are plausible. Furthermore, the numbers changed later on in the battle when most of the army retreated and only approximately 3,000 men remained (300 Spartans, 700 Thespians, 400 Thebans, possibly up to 900 helots, and 1,000 Phocians stationed above the pass, less the casualties sustained in the previous days).

== Strategic and tactical considerations ==
A flow map of the battle

From a strategic point of view, by defending Thermopylae, the Greeks were making the best possible use of their forces. As long as they could prevent a further Persian advance into Greece, they had no need to seek a decisive battle and could, thus, remain on the defensive. Moreover, by defending two constricted passages (Thermopylae and Artemisium), the Greeks' inferior numbers became less of a factor. Conversely, for the Persians the problem of supplying such a large army meant they could not remain in the same place for very long. The Persians, therefore, had to retreat or advance, and advancing required forcing the pass of Thermopylae.

Tactically, the pass at Thermopylae was ideally suited to the Greek style of warfare. A hoplite phalanx could block the narrow pass with ease, with no risk of being outflanked by cavalry. Moreover, in the pass, the phalanx would have been very difficult to assault for the more lightly armed Persian infantry. The major weak point for the Greeks was the mountain track which led across the highland parallel to Thermopylae, that could allow their position to be outflanked. Although probably unsuitable for cavalry, this path could easily be traversed by the Persian infantry (many of whom were versed in mountain warfare). Leonidas was made aware of this path by local people from Trachis, and he positioned a detachment of Phocian troops there in order to block this route.

=== Topography of the battlefield ===
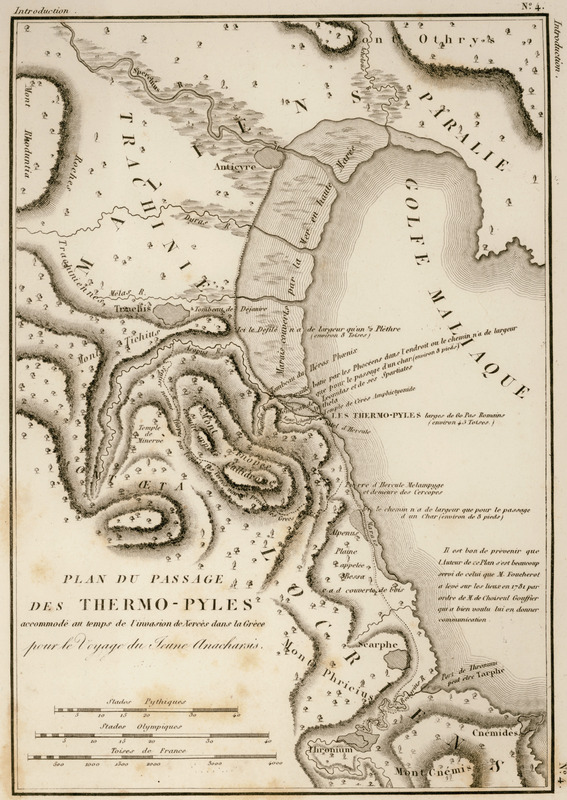
Map of Thermopylae area with a reconstructed shoreline of 480 BC.

It is often claimed that at the time, the pass of Thermopylae consisted of a track along the shore of the Malian Gulf so narrow that only one chariot could pass through at a time. In fact, as noted below, the pass was 100 metres (330 ft) wide, probably wider than the Greeks could have held against the Persian masses. Herodotus reports that the Phocians had improved the defences of the pass by channeling the stream from the hot springs to create a marsh, and it was a causeway across this marsh which was only wide enough for a single chariot to traverse. In a later passage, describing a Gaulish attempt to force the pass, Pausanias states "The cavalry on both sides proved useless, as the ground at the Pass is not only narrow, but also smooth because of the natural rock, while most of it is slippery owing to its being covered with streams...the losses of the barbarians it was impossible to discover exactly. For the number of them that disappeared beneath the mud was great."

On the north side of the roadway was the Malian Gulf, into which the land shelved gently. When at a later date, an army of Gauls led by Brennus attempted to force the pass, the shallowness of the water gave the Greek fleet great difficulty getting close enough to the fighting to bombard the Gauls with ship-borne missile weapons.

Along the path itself was a series of three constrictions, or "gates" (pylai), and at the centre gate a wall that had been erected by the Phocians, in the previous century, to aid in their defence against Thessalian invasions. The name "Hot Gates" comes from the hot springs that were located there.

The terrain of the battlefield was nothing that Xerxes and his forces were accustomed to. Although coming from a mountainous country, the Persians were not prepared for the real nature of the country they had invaded. The pure ruggedness of this area is caused by torrential downpours for four months of the year, combined with an intense summer season of scorching heat that cracks the ground. Vegetation is scarce and consists of low, thorny shrubs. The hillsides along the pass are covered in thick brush, with some plants reaching 10 feet (3.0 m) high. With the sea on one side and steep, impassable hills on the other, King Leonidas and his men chose the perfect topographical position to battle the Persian invaders.

Today, the pass is not near the sea, but is several kilometres inland because of sedimentation in the Malian Gulf. The old track appears at the foot of the hills around the plain, flanked by a modern road. Recent core samples indicate that the pass was only 100 metres (330 ft) wide, and the waters came up to the gates: "Little do the visitors realize that the battle took place across the road from the monument." The pass still is a natural defensive position to modern armies, and forces of the British Empire in the Second World War made a defence in 1941 against the invasion by Nazi Germany mere metres from the original battlefield.

- Maps of the region:
- Image of the battlefield, from the east

== Battle ==
=== First day ===
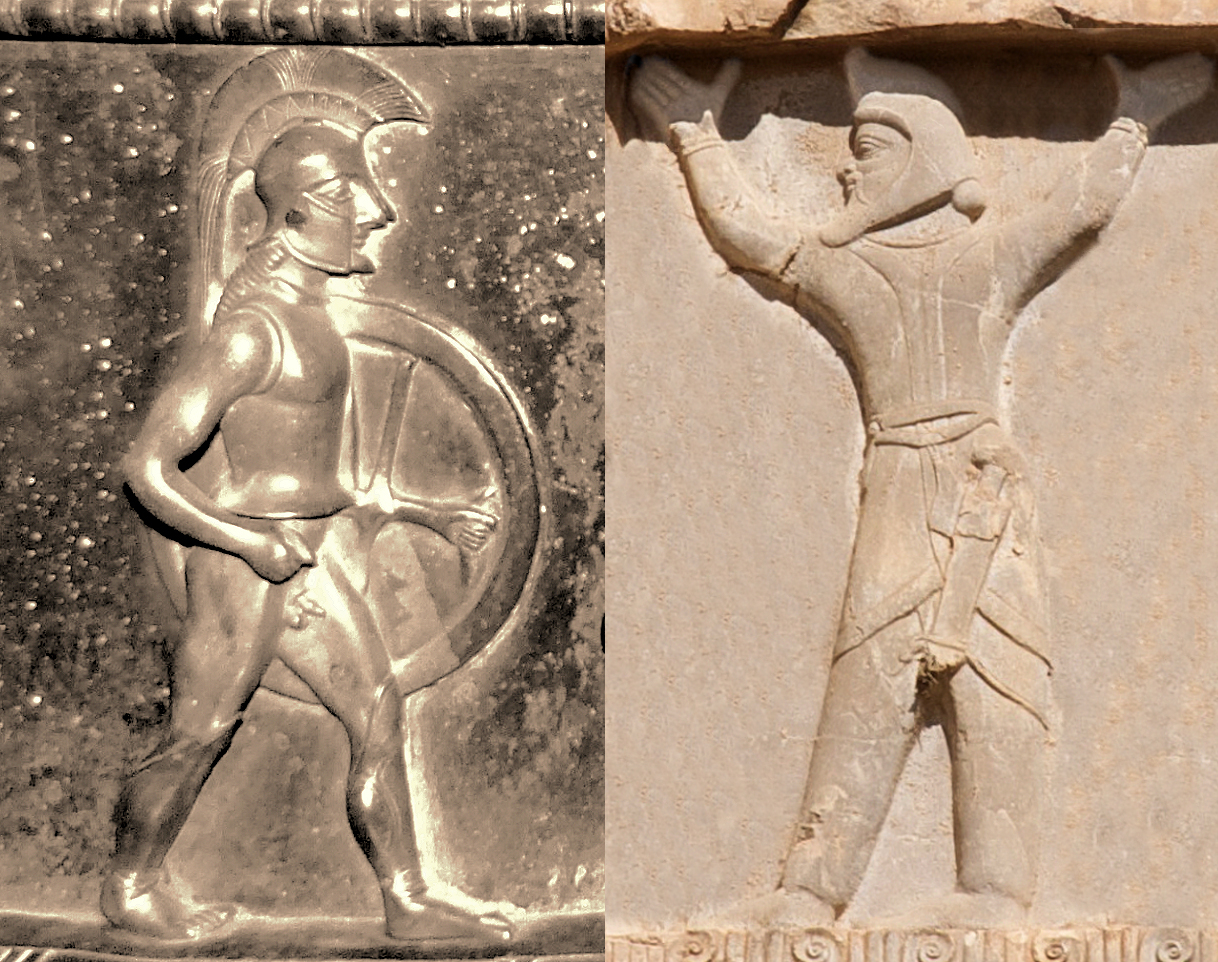
Contemporary depictions: probable Spartan hoplite (Vix crater, c. 500 BC), and Scythian warrior of the Achaemenid army (tomb of Xerxes, c. 480 BC), at the time of the Second Persian invasion of Greece (480–479 BC).

On the fifth day after the Persian arrival at Thermopylae and the first day of the battle, Xerxes finally resolved to attack the Greeks. First, he ordered 5,000 archers to shoot a barrage of arrows, but they were ineffective; they shot from at least 100 yards away, according to modern day scholars, and the Greeks' wooden shields (sometimes covered with a very thin layer of bronze) and bronze helmets deflected the arrows. After that, Xerxes sent a force of 10,000 Medes and Cissians to take the defenders prisoner and bring them before him. The Persians soon launched a frontal assault, in waves of around 10,000 men, on the Greek position. The Greeks fought in front of the Phocian wall, at the narrowest part of the pass, which enabled them to use as few soldiers as possible. Details of the tactics are scant; Diodorus says, "the men stood shoulder to shoulder", and the Greeks were "superior in valour and in the great size of their shields." This probably describes the standard Greek phalanx, in which the men formed a wall of overlapping shields and layered spear points protruding out from the sides of the shields, which would have been highly effective as long as it spanned the width of the pass. The weaker shields, and shorter spears and swords of the Persians prevented them from effectively engaging the Greek hoplites. Herodotus says that the units for each city were kept together; units were rotated in and out of the battle to prevent fatigue, which implies the Greeks had more men than necessary to block the pass. The Greeks killed so many Medes that Xerxes is said to have stood up three times from the seat from which he was watching the battle. According to Ctesias, the first wave was "cut to ribbons", with only two or three Spartans killed in return.

According to Herodotus and Diodorus, Xerxes, having taken the measure of the enemy, threw his best troops into a second assault the same day, the Immortals, an elite corps of 10,000 men. However, the Immortals fared no better than the Medes, and failed to make any headway against the Greeks. The Spartans reportedly used a tactic of feigning retreat, and then turning and killing the enemy troops when they ran after them.

=== Second day ===
The flank exposed by Ephialtes

On the second day Xerxes again sent in the infantry to attack the pass, "supposing that their enemies, being so few, were now disabled by wounds and could no longer resist." However, the Persians had no more success on the second day than on the first. Xerxes at last stopped the assault and withdrew to his camp, "totally perplexed".

Later that day, however, as Xerxes was pondering what to do next, he received a windfall; a Trachinian named Ephialtes informed him of the mountain path around Thermopylae and offered to guide the Persian army. Ephialtes was motivated by the desire for a reward. For this act, the name "Ephialtes" received a lasting stigma; it came to mean "nightmare" in the Greek language and to symbolise the archetypal traitor in Greek culture.

Herodotus reports that Xerxes sent his commander Hydarnes that evening, with the men under his command, the Immortals, to encircle the Greeks via the path. However, he does not say who those men were. The Immortals had been bloodied on the first day, so it is possible that Hydarnes may have been given overall command of an enhanced force including what was left of the Immortals; according to Diodorus, Hydarnes had a force of 20,000 for the mission. The path led from east of the Persian camp along the ridge of Mt. Anopaea behind the cliffs that flanked the pass. It branched, with one path leading to Phocis and the other down to the Malian Gulf at Alpenus, the first town of Locris.

=== Third day ===
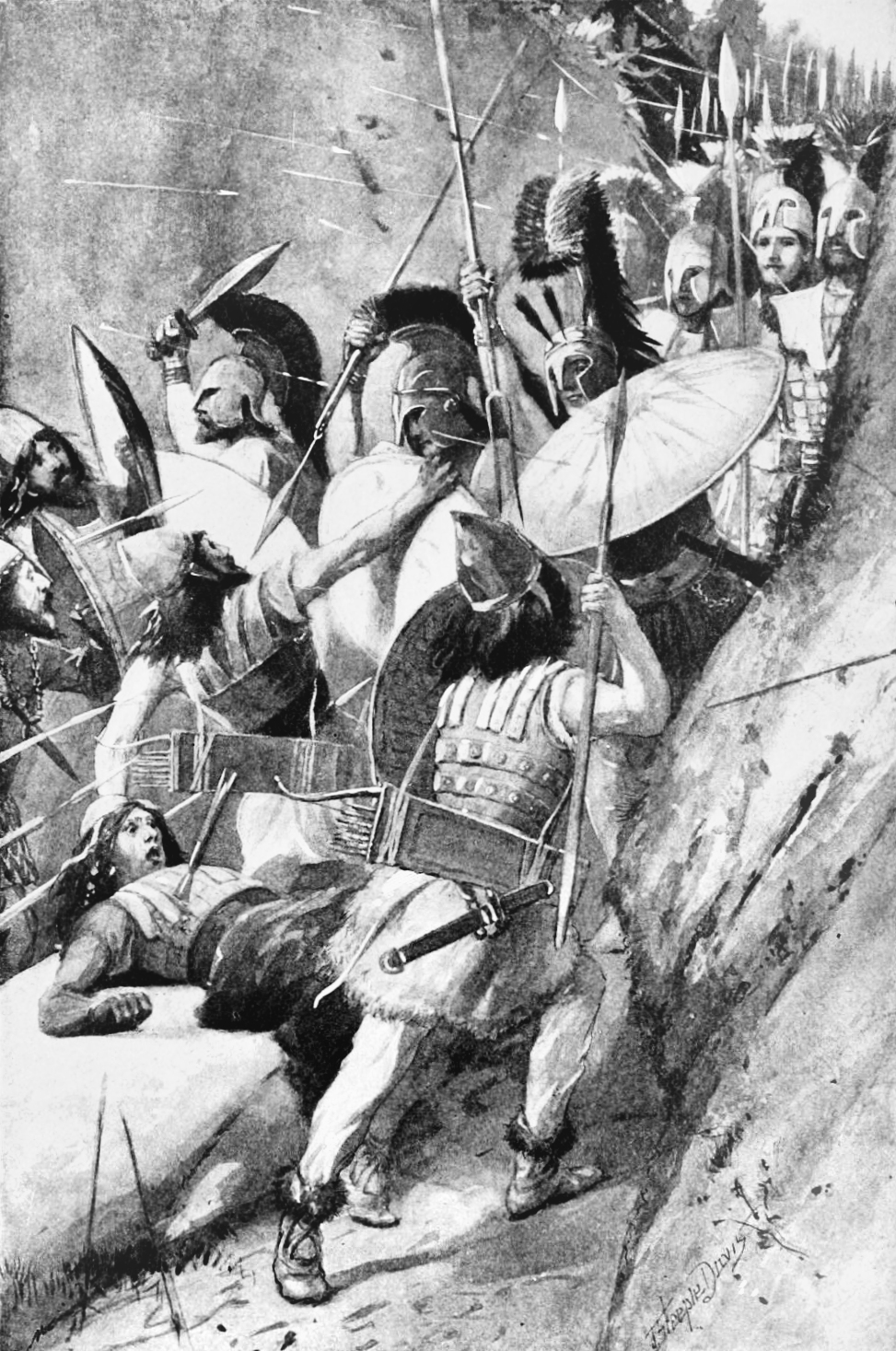
Scene of the Battle of the Thermopylae (19th century illustration).

At daybreak on the third day, the Phocians guarding the path above Thermopylae became aware of the outflanking Persian column by the rustling of oak leaves. Herodotus says they jumped up and were greatly amazed. Hydarnes was perhaps just as amazed to see them hastily arming themselves as they were to see him and his forces. He feared they were Spartans but was informed by Ephialtes that they were not. The Phocians retreated to a nearby hill to make their stand (assuming the Persians had come to attack them). However, not wishing to be delayed, the Persians merely shot a volley of arrows at them, before bypassing them to continue with their encirclement of the main Greek force.

Learning from a runner that the Phocians had not held the path, Leonidas called a council of war at dawn. According to Diodorus, a Persian called Tyrrhastiadas, a Cymaean by birth, warned the Greeks. Some of the Greeks argued for withdrawal, but Leonidas resolved to stay at the pass with the Spartans. Upon discovering that his army had been encircled, Leonidas told his allies that they could leave if they wanted to. While many of the Greeks took him up on his offer and fled, around 2,000 soldiers stayed behind to fight and die. Knowing that the end was near, the Greeks marched into the open field and met the Persians head-on. Many of the Greek contingents then either chose to withdraw (without orders) or were ordered to leave by Leonidas (Herodotus admits that there is some doubt about which actually happened). The contingent of 700 Thespians, led by their general Demophilus, refused to leave and committed themselves to the fight. Also present were the 400 Thebans and probably the helots who had accompanied the Spartans.

Leonidas's actions have been the subject of much discussion. It is commonly stated that the Spartans were obeying the laws of Sparta by not retreating. It has also been proposed that the failure to retreat from Thermopylae gave rise to the notion that Spartans never retreated. It has also been suggested that Leonidas, recalling the words of the Oracle, was committed to sacrificing his life in order to save Sparta.

One commonly accepted theory is that Leonidas chose to form a rearguard so that the other Greek contingents could get away. If all the troops had retreated, the open ground beyond the pass would have allowed the Persian cavalry to run the Greeks down. If they had all remained at the pass, they would have been encircled and would eventually have all been killed. By covering the retreat and continuing to block the pass, Leonidas could save more than 3,000 men, who would be able to fight again.

The Thebans have also been the subject of some discussion. Herodotus suggests they were brought to the battle as hostages to ensure the good behavior of Thebes. However, Plutarch had argued that if they were hostages, they would have been sent away with the rest of the Greeks. The likelihood is that these were the Theban "loyalists", who unlike the majority of their fellow citizens, objected to Persian domination. They thus probably came to Thermopylae of their own free will and stayed to the end because they could not return to Thebes if the Persians conquered Boeotia.

The Thespians, resolved as they were not to submit to Xerxes, faced the destruction of their city if the Persians took Boeotia. However, this alone does not explain the fact that they remained; the remainder of Thespiae was successfully evacuated before the Persians arrived there. It seems that the Thespians volunteered to remain as a simple act of self-sacrifice, all the more amazing since their contingent represented every single hoplite the city could muster. This seems to have been a particularly Thespian trait – on at least two other occasions in later history, a Thespian force would commit itself to a fight to the death.

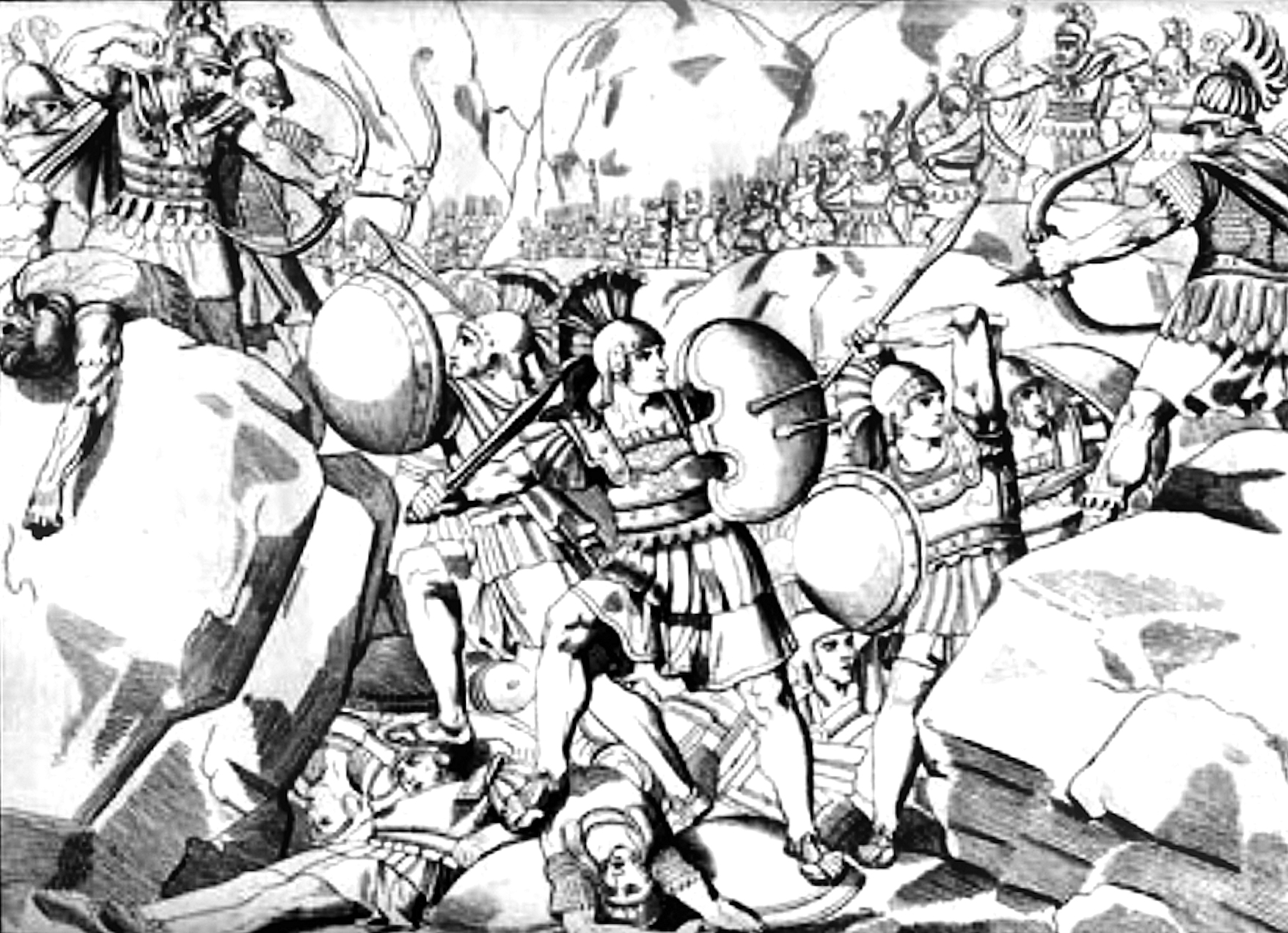
Spartans surrounded by Persians, Battle of Thermopylae. 19th century illustration.

At dawn, Xerxes made libations, pausing to allow the Immortals sufficient time to descend the mountain, and then began his advance. A Persian force of 10,000 men, comprising light infantry and cavalry, charged at the front of the Greek formation. The Greeks this time sallied forth from the wall to meet the Persians in the wider part of the pass, in an attempt to slaughter as many Persians as they could. They fought with spears, until every spear was shattered, and then switched to xiphē (short swords). In this struggle, Herodotus states that two of Xerxes's brothers fell: Abrocomes and Hyperanthes. Leonidas also died in the assault, shot down by Persian archers, and the two sides fought over his body; the Greeks took possession. As the Immortals approached, the Greeks withdrew and took a stand on a hill behind the wall. The Thebans "moved away from their companions, and with hands upraised, advanced toward the barbarians..." (Rawlinson translation), but a few were slain before their surrender was accepted. The king later had the Theban prisoners branded with the royal mark. Of the remaining defenders, Herodotus says:

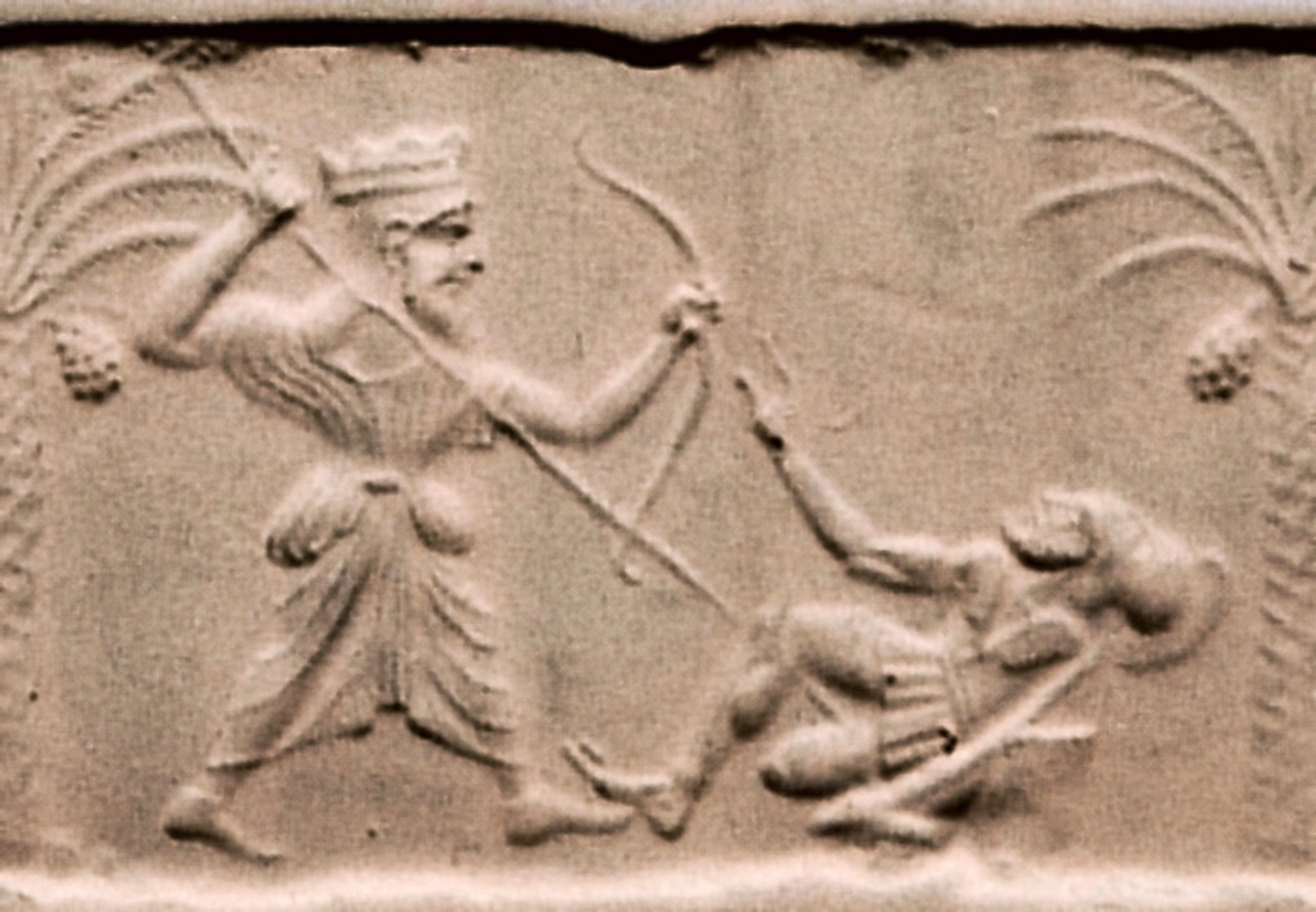
Crown-wearing Achaemenid king killing a Greek hoplite. Impression from a cylinder seal, sculpted circa 500 BC–475 BC, at the time of Xerxes. Metropolitan Museum of Art.

Here they defended themselves to the last, those who still had swords using them, and the others resisting with their hands and teeth.

Tearing down part of the wall, Xerxes ordered the hill surrounded, and the Persians rained down arrows until every last Greek was dead. In 1939, archaeologist Spyridon Marinatos, excavating at Thermopylae, found large numbers of Persian bronze arrowheads on Kolonos Hill, which changed the identification of the hill on which the Greeks were thought to have died from a smaller one nearer the wall.

The pass at Thermopylae was thus opened to the Persian army, according to Herodotus, at the cost to the Persians of up to 20,000 fatalities. The Greek rearguard, meanwhile, was annihilated, with a probable loss of 2,000 men, including those killed on the first two days of battle. Herodotus says, at one point 4,000 Greeks died, but assuming the Phocians guarding the track were not killed during the battle (as Herodotus implies), this would be almost every Greek soldier present (by Herodotus's own estimates), and this number is probably too high.

== Aftermath ==
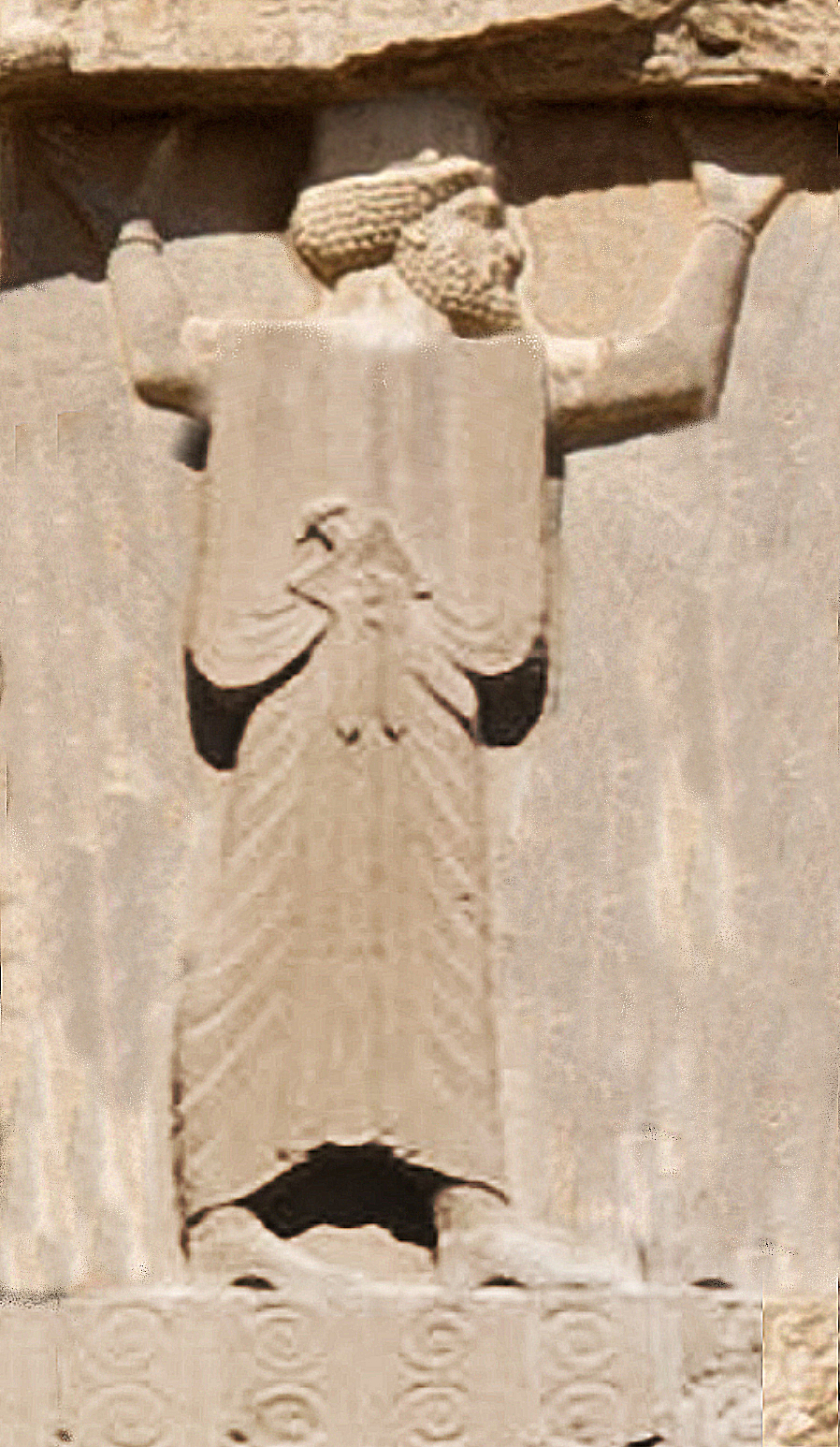
A Persian soldier at the time of the Second Achaemenid invasion of Greece.

After the Persians' departure, the Greeks collected their dead and buried them on the hill. A full 40 years after the battle, Leonidas's bones were returned to Sparta, where he was buried again with full honours; funeral games were held every year in his memory.

With Thermopylae now opened to the Persian army, the continuation of the blockade at Artemisium by the Greek fleet became irrelevant. The simultaneous naval Battle of Artemisium had been a tactical stalemate, and the Greek navy was able to retreat in good order to the Saronic Gulf, where it helped to ferry the remaining Athenian citizens to the island of Salamis.

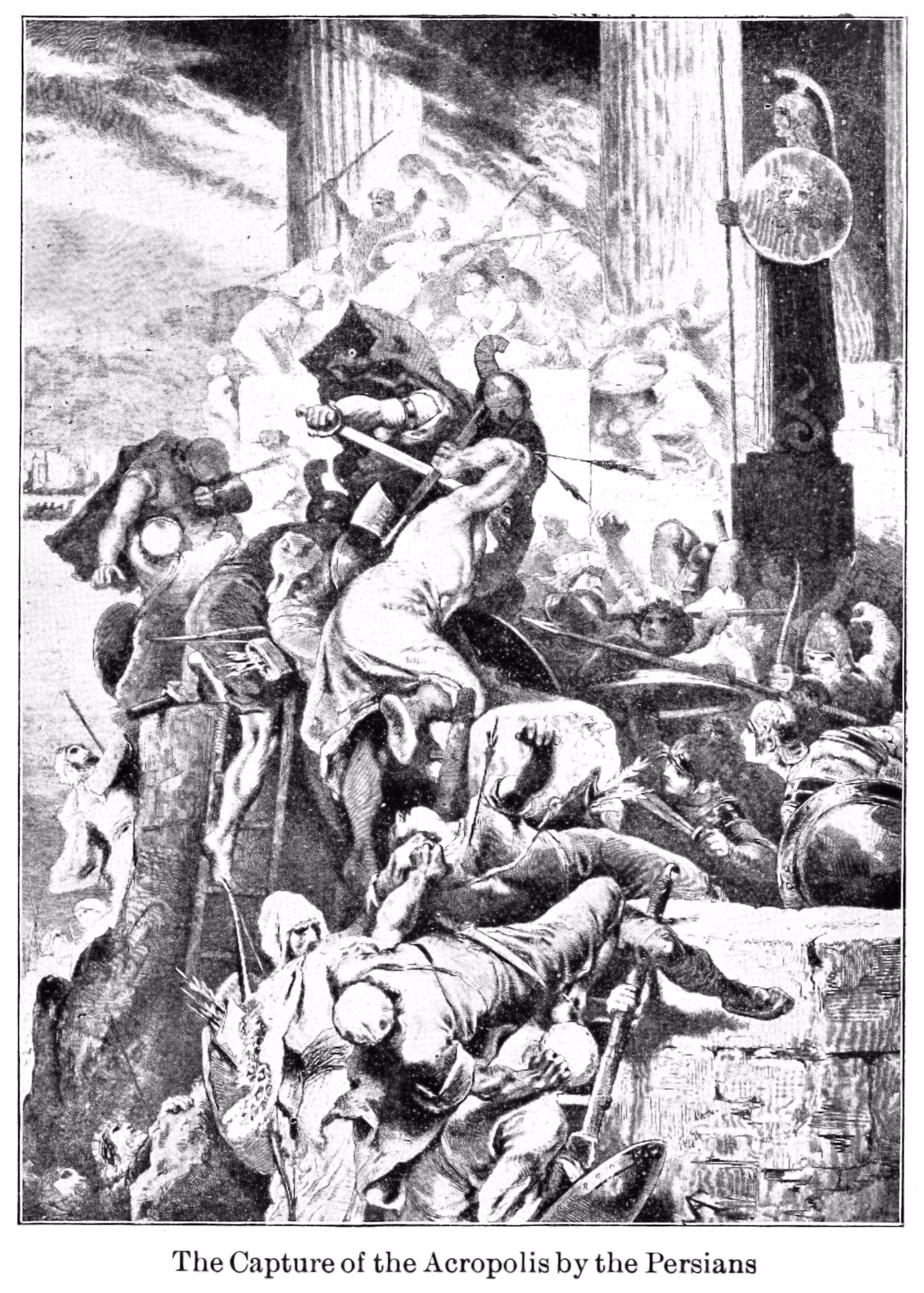
The Capture of the Acropolis and the destruction of Athens by the Achaemenids, following the battle of Thermopylae.

Following Thermopylae, the Persian army proceeded to sack and burn Plataea and Thespiae, the Boeotian cities that had not submitted, before it marched on the now evacuated city of Athens and accomplished the Achaemenid destruction of Athens. Meanwhile, the Greeks (for the most part Peloponnesians) preparing to defend the Isthmus of Corinth, demolished the single road that led through it and built a wall across it. As at Thermopylae, making this an effective strategy required the Greek navy to stage a simultaneous blockade, barring the passage of the Persian navy across the Saronic Gulf, so that troops could not be landed directly on the Peloponnese. However, instead of a mere blockade, Themistocles persuaded the Greeks to seek a decisive victory against the Persian fleet. Luring the Persian navy into the Straits of Salamis, the Greek fleet was able to destroy much of the Persian fleet in the Battle of Salamis, which essentially ended the threat to the Peloponnese.

Fearing the Greeks might attack the bridges across the Hellespont and trap his army in Europe, Xerxes now retreated with much of the Persian army back to Asia, though nearly all of them died of starvation and disease on the return voyage. He left a hand-picked force, under Mardonius, to complete the conquest the following year. However, under pressure from the Athenians, the Peloponnesians eventually agreed to try to force Mardonius to battle, and they marched on Attica. Mardonius retreated to Boeotia to lure the Greeks into open terrain, and the two sides eventually met near the city of Plataea. At the Battle of Plataea, the Greek army won a decisive victory, destroying much of the Persian army and ending the invasion of Greece. Meanwhile, at the near-simultaneous naval Battle of Mycale, they also destroyed much of the remaining Persian fleet, thereby reducing the threat of further invasions.

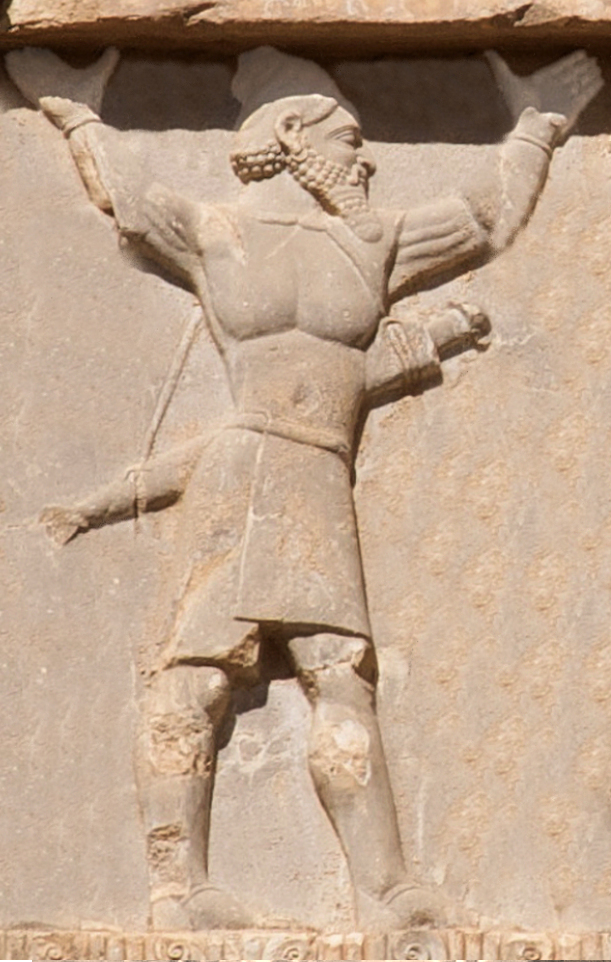
Hidush (Indian soldier of the Achaemenid army), Tomb of Xerxes, circa 480 BC, Naqsh-e Rustam. Herodotus explained that Indians participated in the Second Persian invasion of Greece.

Thermopylae is one of the most famous battles in European ancient history, repeatedly referenced in ancient, recent, and contemporary culture. In Western culture at least, it is the Greeks who are lauded for their performance in battle. However, within the context of the Persian invasion, Thermopylae was undoubtedly a defeat for the Greeks. It seems clear that the Greek strategy was to hold off the Persians at Thermopylae and Artemisium; whatever they may have intended, it was presumably not their desire to surrender all of Boeotia and Attica to the Persians. The Greek position at Thermopylae, despite being massively outnumbered, was nearly impregnable. If the position had been held for even a little longer, the Persians might have had to retreat for lack of food and water. Thus, despite the heavy losses, forcing the pass was strategically a Persian victory, but the successful retreat of the bulk of the Greek troops was in its own sense a victory as well. The battle itself had shown that even when heavily outnumbered, the Greeks could put up an effective fight against the Persians, and the defeat at Thermopylae had turned Leonidas and the men under his command into martyrs. That boosted the morale of all Greek soldiers in the second Persian invasion.

It is sometimes stated that Thermopylae was a Pyrrhic victory for the Persians (i.e., one in which the victor is as damaged by the battle as the defeated party). However, there is no suggestion by Herodotus that the effect on the Persian forces was that. The idea ignores the fact that the Persians would, in the aftermath of Thermopylae, conquer the majority of Greece, and the fact that they were still fighting in Greece a year later. Alternatively, the argument is sometimes advanced that the last stand at Thermopylae was a successful delaying action that gave the Greek navy time to prepare for the Battle of Salamis. (Note: "The Battle of Thermopylae was a Pyrrhic victory for [the Persians] but it offered Athens invaluable time to prepare for the decisive naval battle of Salamis one month later.") However, compared to the probable time (about one month) between Thermopylae and Salamis, the time bought was negligible. Furthermore, this idea also neglects the fact that a Greek navy was fighting at Artemisium during the Battle of Thermopylae, incurring losses in the process. George Cawkwell suggests that the gap between Thermopylae and Salamis was caused by Xerxes's systematically reducing Greek opposition in Phocis and Boeotia, and not as a result of the Battle of Thermopylae; thus, as a delaying action, Thermopylae was insignificant compared to Xerxes's own procrastination. Far from labelling Thermopylae as a Pyrrhic victory, modern academic treatises on the Graeco-Persian Wars tend to emphasize the success of Xerxes in breaching the formidable Greek position and the subsequent conquest of the majority of Greece. For instance, Cawkwell states: "he was successful on both land and sea, and the Great Invasion began with a brilliant success. ... Xerxes had every reason to congratulate himself", while Lazenby describes the Greek defeat as "disastrous".

The fame of Thermopylae is thus principally derived not from its effect on the outcome of the war but for the inspirational example it set. Thermopylae is famous because of the heroism of the doomed rearguard, who, despite facing certain death, remained at the pass. Ever since, the events of Thermopylae have been the source of effusive praise from many sources: "Salamis, Plataea, Mycale and Sicily are the fairest sister-victories which the Sun has ever seen, yet they would never dare to compare their combined glory with the glorious defeat of King Leonidas and his men". A second reason is the example it set of free men, fighting for their country and their freedom:

So almost immediately, contemporary Greeks saw Thermopylae as a critical moral and culture lesson. In universal terms, a small, free people had willingly outfought huge numbers of imperial subjects who advanced under the lash. More specifically, the Western idea that soldiers themselves decide where, how, and against whom they will fight was contrasted against the Eastern notion of despotism and monarchy—freedom proving the stronger idea as the more courageous fighting of the Greeks at Thermopylae, and their later victories at Salamis and Plataea attested.

While this paradigm of "free men" outfighting "slaves" can be seen as a rather sweeping overgeneralisation (there are many counter-examples), it is nevertheless true that many commentators have used Thermopylae to illustrate this point.

Militarily, although the battle was actually not decisive in the context of the Persian invasion, Thermopylae is of some significance on the basis of the first two days of fighting. The performance of the defenders is used as an example of the advantages of training, equipment, and good use of terrain as force multipliers.

== Legacy ==
=== Monuments ===
There are several monuments around the battlefield of Thermopylae. One is a statue of King Leonidas I, portrayed as bearing a spear and shield.

==== Epitaph of Simonides ====
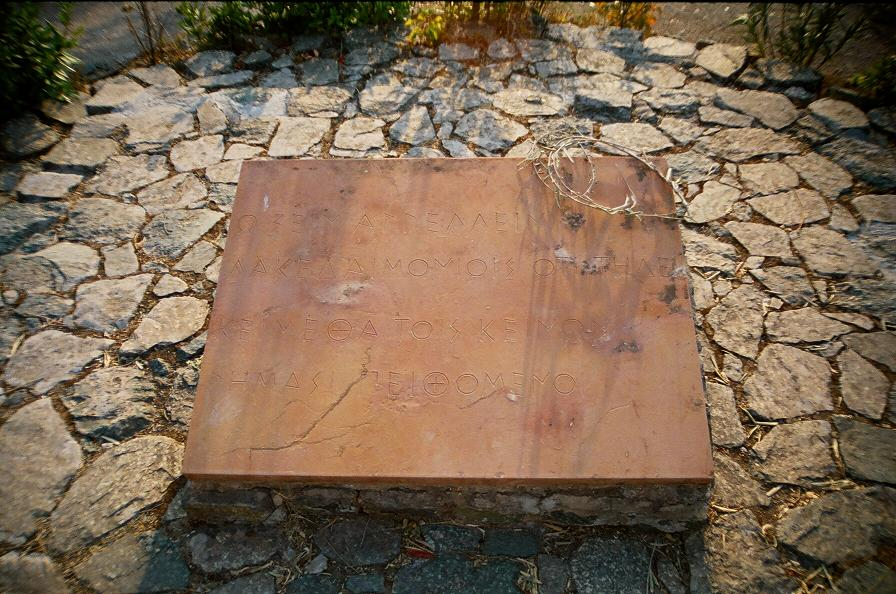
Epitaph with Simonides's epigram

A well-known epigram, usually attributed to Simonides, was engraved as an epitaph on a commemorative stone placed on top of the burial mound of the Spartans at Thermopylae. It is also the hill on which the last of them died. The original stone has not survived, but in 1955, the epitaph was engraved on a new stone. The text from Herodotus is:

Ὦ ξεῖν', ἀγγέλλειν Λακεδαιμονίοις ὅτι τῇδε
κείμεθα, τοῖς κείνων ῥήμασι πειθόμενοι.

Ō ksein', angellein Lakedaimoniois hoti tēide
keimetha, tois keinōn rhēmasi peithomenoi.

O stranger, tell the Lacedaemonians that
we lie here, obedient to their words.

The alternative ancient reading πειθόμενοι νομίμοις (peithomenoi nomίmois) for ῥήμασι πειθόμενοι (rhēmasi peithomenoi) substitutes "laws" (νόμοι) for "words".

The form of this ancient Greek poetry is an elegiac couplet, commonly used for epitaphs. Some English renderings are given in the table below. It is also an example of Laconian brevity, which allows for varying interpretations of the meaning of the poem. Ioannis Ziogas points out that the usual English translations are far from the only interpretation possible, and indicate much about the romantic tendencies of the translators.

It was well known in ancient Greece that all the Spartans who had been sent to Thermopylae had been killed there (with the exception of Aristodemus and Pantites), and the epitaph exploits the conceit that there was nobody left to bring the news of their deeds back to Sparta. Greek epitaphs often appealed to the passing reader (always called 'stranger') for sympathy, but the epitaph for the dead Spartans at Thermopylae took this convention much further than usual, asking the reader to make a personal journey to Sparta to break the news that the Spartan expeditionary force had been wiped out. The stranger is also asked to stress that the Spartans died 'fulfilling their orders'.

Translation	Notes
Go tell the Spartans, thou who passest by, That here, obedient to their laws, we lie.	William Lisle Bowles
Stranger, tell the Spartans that we behaved as they would wish us to, and are buried here.	William Golding
Stranger! To Sparta say, her faithful band Here lie in death, remembering her command.	Francis Hodgson
Stranger, report this word, we pray, to the Spartans, that lying Here in this spot we remain, faithfully keeping their laws.	George Campbell Macaulay
Stranger, bear this message to the Spartans, that we lie here obedient to their laws.	William Roger Paton
Go tell the Spartans, stranger passing by, that here obedient to their laws we lie.	Steven Pressfield
Go, stranger, and to Lacedaemon tell That here, obeying her behests, we fell.	George Rawlinson
Go, way-farer, bear news to Sparta's town that here, their bidding done, we laid us down.	Cyril E. Robinson
Go tell the Spartans, you who read: We took their orders, and lie here dead.	Aubrey de Sélincourt
Friend, tell Lacedaemon; Here we lie Obedient to our orders.	William Shepherd
Tell them in Lacedaemon, passer-by, that here obedient to their word we lie	Hadas (1950)
Oh Stranger, tell the Spartans; That we lie here obedient to their word.	From the 1962 film The 300 Spartans
Stranger, when you find us lying here, go tell the Spartans we obeyed their orders.	From the 1977 film Go Tell the Spartans
Go tell the Spartans, passerby: That here, by Spartan law, we lie.	Frank Miller (1998; subsequently used in the 2007 film, 300)

The first line of the epigram was used as the title of the short story "Stranger, Bear Word to the Spartans We…" by the German Nobel Prize laureate Heinrich Böll. A variant of the epigram is inscribed on the Polish Cemetery at Monte Cassino.

John Ruskin expressed the importance of this ideal to Western civilisation as follows:

Also obedience in its highest form is not obedience to a constant and compulsory law, but a persuaded or voluntary yielded obedience to an issued command ... His name who leads the armies of Heaven is "Faithful and True"... and all deeds which are done in alliance with these armies ... are essentially deeds of faith, which therefore ... is at once the source and the substance of all known deed, rightly so called ... as set forth in the last word of the noblest group of words ever, so far as I know, uttered by simple man concerning his practice, being the final testimony of the leaders of a great practical nation ... [the epitaph in Greek]

Cicero recorded a Latin variation in his Tusculanae Disputationes (1.42.101):

Dic, hospes, Spartae nos te hic vidisse iacentes
dum sanctis patriae legibus obsequimur.

Tell, stranger, to Sparta that you saw us lying here
since we followed the sacred laws of the fatherland.

==== Leonidas monument ====
Additionally, there is a modern monument at the site, called the "Leonidas Monument" by Vassos Falireas, in honour of the Spartan king. It features a bronze statue of Leonidas. A sign, under the statue, reads simply: "Μολὼν λαβέ" ("Come and take them!" — as in answer to Xerxes's demand that the Greeks give up their weapons). The metope below depicts battle scenes. The two marble statues on the left and the right of the monument represent, respectively, the river Eurotas and Mount Taygetos, famous landmarks of Sparta.

==== Thespian monument ====
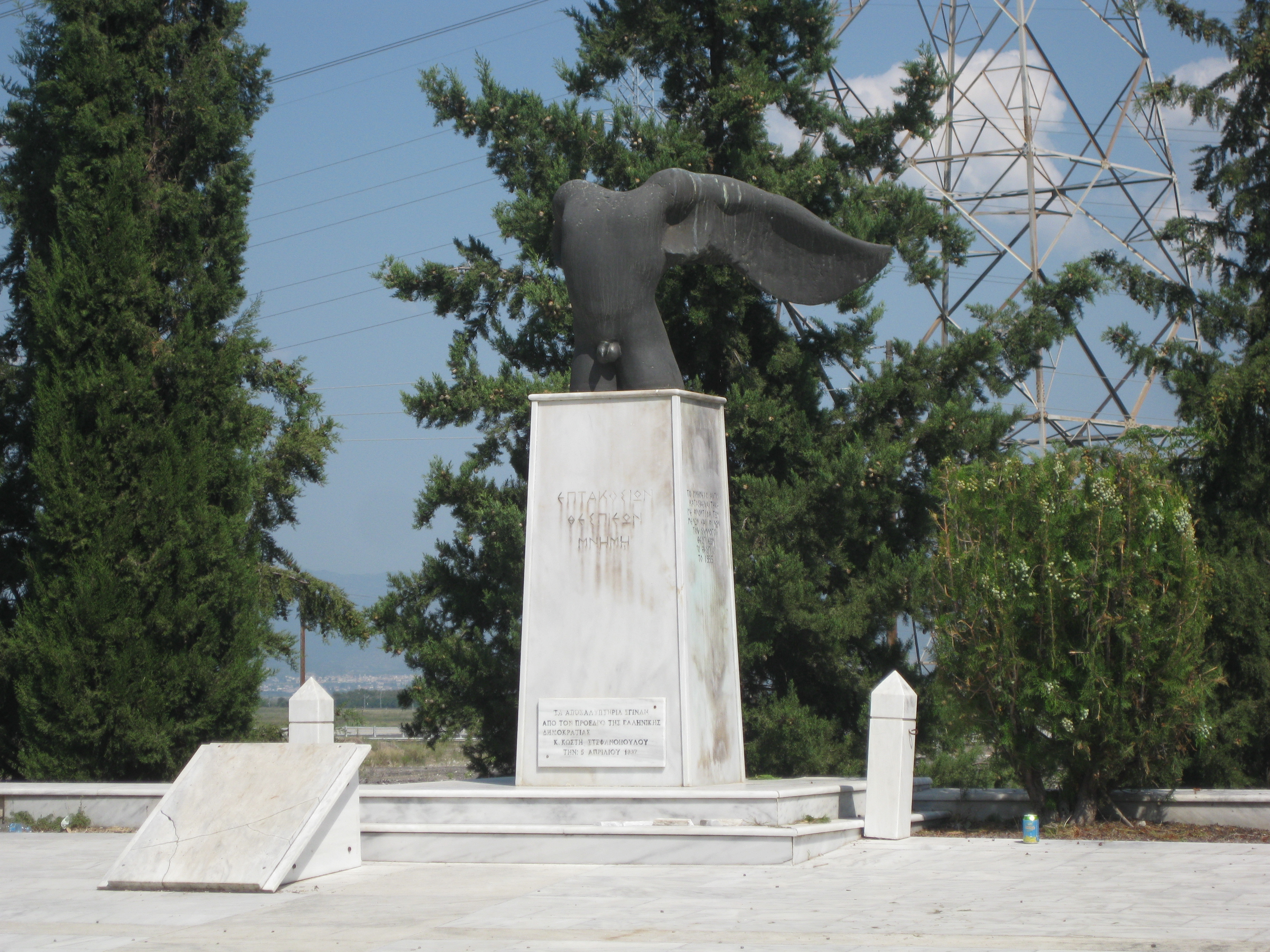
Thespian monument

In 1997 a second monument was officially unveiled by the Greek government, dedicated to the 700 Thespians who fought with the Spartans. The monument is made of marble and features a bronze statue depicting the god Eros, to whom the ancient Thespians accorded particular religious veneration. Under the statue, a sign reads: "In memory of the seven hundred Thespians."

A plate below the statue explains its symbolism:

- The headless male figure symbolises the anonymous sacrifice of the 700 Thespians to their country.
- The outstretched chest symbolises the struggle, the gallantry, the strength, the bravery and the courage.
- The open wing symbolises the victory, the glory, the soul, the spirit and the freedom.
- The broken wing symbolises the voluntary sacrifice and death.
- The naked body symbolises Eros, the most important god of the ancient Thespians, a god of creation, beauty and life.

The monument to the Thespians is placed beside the one to the Spartans.

=== Associated legends ===
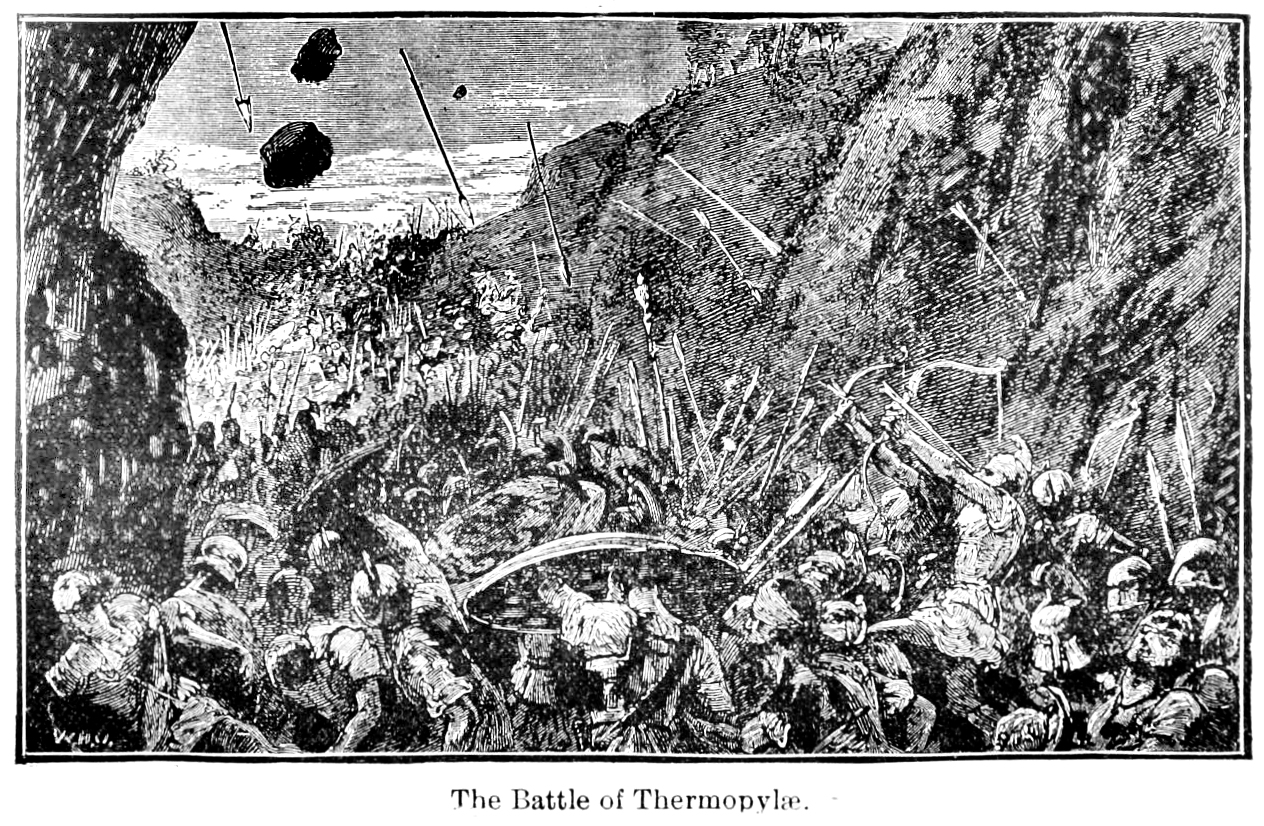
The Battle of Thermopylae, 19th century engraving

Herodotus's colourful account of the battle has provided history with many apocryphal incidents and conversations away from the main historical events. These accounts are obviously not verifiable, but they form an integral part of the legend of the battle and often demonstrate the laconic speech (and wit) of the Spartans to good effect.

For instance, Plutarch recounts, in his Sayings of Spartan Women, upon his departure, Leonidas's wife Gorgo asked what she should do if he did not return, to which Leonidas replied, "Marry a good man and have good children."

It is reported that, upon arriving at Thermopylae, the Persians sent a mounted scout to reconnoitre. The Greeks allowed him to come up to the camp, observe them, and depart. Xerxes found the scout's reports of the size of the Greek force, and that the Spartans were indulging in callisthenics and combing their long hair, laughable. Seeking the counsel of Demaratus, an exiled Spartan king in his retinue, Xerxes was told the Spartans were preparing for battle, and it was their custom to adorn their hair when they were about to risk their lives. Demaratus called them "the bravest men in Greece" and warned the Great King they intended to dispute the pass. He emphasised that he had tried to warn Xerxes earlier in the campaign, but the king had refused to believe him. He added that if Xerxes ever managed to subdue the Spartans, "there is no other nation in all the world which will venture to lift a hand in their defence."

Herodotus also describes Leonidas's reception of a Persian envoy. The ambassador told Leonidas that Xerxes would offer him the kingship of all Greece if he joined with Xerxes. Leonidas answered: "If you had any knowledge of the noble things of life, you would refrain from coveting others' possessions; but for me to die for Greece is better than to be the sole ruler over the people of my race." Then the ambassador asked him more forcefully to surrender their arms. To this Leonidas gave his famous answer: Μολὼν λαβέ ("Come and get them.")

Such laconic bravery doubtlessly helped to maintain morale. Herodotus writes that when Dienekes, a Spartan soldier, was informed that Persian arrows would be so numerous as "to block out the sun", he retorted, "So much the better...then we shall fight our battle in the shade."

After the battle, Xerxes was curious as to what the Greeks had been trying to do (presumably because they had had so few men) and had some Arcadian deserters interrogated in his presence. The answer was: all the other men were participating in the Olympic Games. When Xerxes asked what the prize was for the winner, the answer was: "an olive-wreath". Upon hearing this, Tigranes, a Persian general, said: "Good heavens, Mardonius, what kind of men are these that you have pitted against us? It is not for riches that they contend but for honour!" (Godley translation) or otherwise, "Ye Gods, Mardonius, what men have you brought us to fight against? Men that fight not for gold, but for glory."

=== Commemoration ===
Greece has announced two commemorative coins to mark 2,500 years since the historic battle. While this anniversary took place in 2021, the coins show the dates 2020 and 480 BC and the text "2,500 years since the Battle of Thermopylae."

== Analogues ==
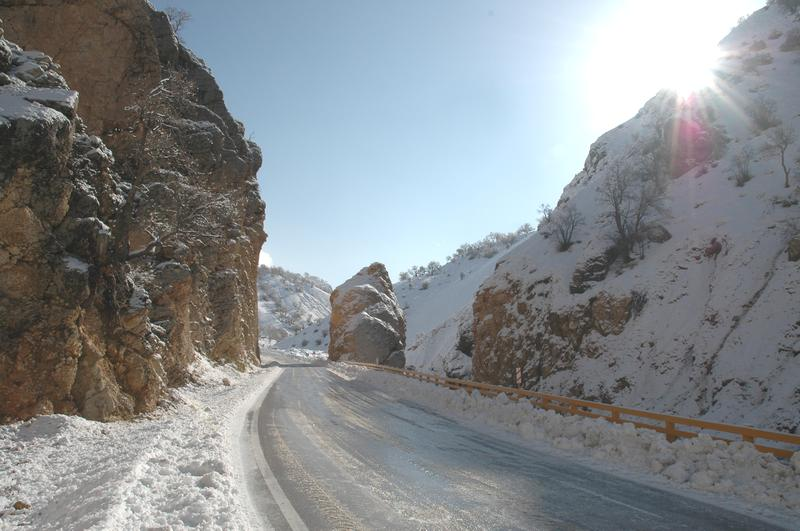
The Persian Gates narrow pass leading to Persepolis

Similarities between the Battle of Thermopylae and the Battle of the Persian Gate have been recognised by both ancient and modern authors, which describe it as a kind of reversal of the Battle of Thermopylae, calling it "the Persian Thermopylae". Here, on Alexander the Great's campaign against Persia in 330 BC, he faced the same situation, encountering a last stand of the Persian forces, commanded by Ariobarzanes, at a narrow pass near Persepolis who held the invaders for a month, until the enemy found a path to their rear. There are even accounts that a local shepherd informed Alexander's forces about the secret path, just as a local Greek showed the Persian forces a secret path around the pass at Thermopylae. Curtius describes the subsequent battle fought by the surrounded, unarmed Persians as "memorable".

== In popular culture ==
The battle's earliest known appearance in culture is a series of epigrams commemorating the dead written by Simonides of Ceos in the battle's aftermath. In Europe, interest in the battle was revitalized in the 1700s with the publication of the poems Leonidas, A Poem by Richard Glover in 1737 and Leonidas by Willem van Haren in 1742.

The battle has been featured in numerous works of art, and overall, there is a long tradition of upholding the story of the battle as an example of virtuous self-sacrifice. Steven Pressfield's 1998 novel Gates of Fire is unusual in depicting the battle as gruesome rather than glorious.

In 2006 director Zack Snyder released the action film 300, which depicts the battle and grossed US$456 million globally. The film was based on a 1998 comic book series of the same name by Frank Miller.

== See also ==
- List of last stands
