= Ephialtes of Trachis =

Betrayer of the Greeks during the Battle of Thermopylae

Ephialtes (/ˌɛfiˈæltiːz/; Greek: Ἐφιάλτης Ephialtēs) (Note: Spelled Ephialtes (Ἐφιάλτης) by Herodotus.) was a Greek renegade during the Greco-Persian Wars. Born to Eurydemus (Εὐρύδημος) of Malis, he revealed the existence of a path around the Greek coalition's position at Thermopylae to the Achaemenid Empire. His efforts allowed the Persian army to overrun the Greeks' defensive formation and thereby win the Battle of Thermopylae in September 480 BC. Ephialtes had hoped that he would be rewarded by the Persian king Xerxes I, but no such reward was bestowed upon him and he was instead forced to go into hiding when a bounty was placed on his head by the allied Greeks in their pursuit of punishing his act of treason. According to Herodotus, this bounty was collected by Athenades (Ἀθηνάδης) of Trachis approximately a decade after the second Persian invasion of Greece was repelled; the Spartans paid Athenades although his motivation for carrying out the killing apparently had nothing to do with Ephialtes' status as an outlaw.

== Betraying the Greeks to the Persian army ==
The allied Greek land forces, which Herodotus states numbered no more than 4,200 men, had chosen Thermopylae to block the advance of the much larger Persian army. Although this gap between the Trachinian Cliffs and the Malian Gulf was only "wide enough for a single carriage", it could be bypassed by a trail that led over the mountains south of Thermopylae and joined the main road behind the Greek position. Herodotus notes that this trail was well known to the locals, who had used it in the past for raiding the neighboring Phocians.

Ephialtes revealed the existence of this trail to Xerxes, the Persian ruler. Herodotus notes that two other men were accused of the betrayal: Onetas, a native of Carystus and son of Phanagoras; and Corydallus, a native of Anticyra. Nevertheless, he argues Ephialtes was the one who revealed this trail because "the deputies of the Greeks, the Pylagorae, who must have had the best means for ascertaining the truth, did not offer the reward on the heads of Onetas and Corydallus, but for that of Ephialtes." The Persians used the trail to outflank the defenders. The Spartan king, Leonidas, sent away most of the Greeks before they could be surrounded, but he himself remained behind with a rear guard composed of 300 of his men, the Thespian contingent, comprising 700 Thespians, and a Theban detachment, composed of 400 men.

Ephialtes expected to be rewarded by the Persians, but this came to nothing when they were defeated at the Battle of Salamis. He then fled to Thessaly; the Amphictyons at Pylae had offered a reward for his death. According to Herodotus, he was killed for an apparently unrelated reason by Athenades (Greek: Ἀθηνάδης) of Trachis, around 470 BC, but the Spartans rewarded Athenades all the same.

== In popular culture ==
In the 1962 film The 300 Spartans, Ephialtes was portrayed by Kieron Moore and is depicted as a shady farmhand who worked on a goat farm near Thermopylae. He betrays the Spartans because he was spurned by the Spartan maiden, Ellas, thinking he could win her over by dangling riches he thought he would later have.

Frank Miller's 1998 comic book miniseries 300, the 2006 film adaptation of the same name, and the 2014 sequel, portray Ephialtes (played in the films by Andrew Tiernan) as a severely deformed Spartan exile whose parents fled Sparta to protect him from the infanticide he would have surely suffered as a disfigured infant. It is an entirely fictionalised depiction. There is no evidence Ephialtes was deformed.

== See also ==
- Battle of Traigh Ghruinneart, where a dwarf switches sides and kills the leader of the forces he originally was to fight for.
- Martín Alhaja, who had a similar role in the Medieval Battle of Las Navas de Tolosa.
