= 300 (comics) =

1998 comic-book limited series

- Book cover

Publication information
- Publisher: Dark Horse Comics
- Schedule: Monthly
- Format: Limited series
- Publication date: May – September 1998
- No. of issues: 5

Creative team
- Written by: Frank Miller
- Artist: Frank Miller
- Colorist: Lynn Varley

Collected editions
- Hardcover: ISBN 1-56971-402-9

300 is a 1998 limited series comic book written and illustrated by Frank Miller with painted colors by Lynn Varley.

The comic is a fictional retelling of the Battle of Thermopylae and the events leading up to it from the perspective of Leonidas of Sparta. 300 was particularly inspired by the 1962 film The 300 Spartans, a film Miller watched as a young boy. The work was adapted in 2006 to a film of the same name directed by Zack Snyder.

In 2018, Dark Horse published Xerxes: The Fall of the House of Darius and the Rise of Alexander, also written and drawn by Miller, acting as a prequel and sequel to the events of 300, depicting Xerxes I's rise to the throne, and the subsequent destruction of the Persian Empire under his descendant Darius III, by Alexander the Great.

== Publication and awards ==
Each page of the novel is illustrated as a double-page spread. When the series was gathered into hardcover form, the individual pages were twice as wide as a normal comic. Miller's art style for this project was similar to his Sin City work, although the addition of consistent color is an obvious difference.

300 was initially published as a monthly five-issue comic book limited series by Dark Horse Comics, the first issue published in May 1998. The issues were titled Honor, Duty, Glory, Combat and Victory. The series won three Eisner Awards in 1999: "Best Limited Series", "Best Writer/Artist" for Frank Miller and "Best Colorist" for Lynn Varley. The work was collected as a hardcover volume in 1999.

The popularity of the film has boosted sales of the trade paperback edition. The 10th printing had an announced print run of 40,000 copies, with an 11th printing to follow. This is in addition to the 88,000 copies already sold since the initial volume was released in 1999.

== Synopsis ==
In 480 BC, King Leonidas of Sparta gathers 300 of his best men to fight the upcoming Persian invasion. In what is likely a suicide mission, they and their allies plan to stop King Xerxes' invasion of Greece at the narrow cliffs of the "Hot Gates" (Thermopylae). The terrain prevented the Greeks from being overwhelmed by Xerxes' superior numbers (a military tactic usually called "defeat in detail").

Before the battle starts, Ephialtes, a deformed Spartan, begs Leonidas to let him fight but is rejected due to his hunchbacked form, which prevents him from lifting his shield high enough to be of use for the phalanx. Ephialtes becomes despondent due to Leonidas' refusal and throws himself off a cliff.

The Spartans and their allies successfully hold off the Persians for two days and nights. During a break in the fighting, Xerxes meets with Leonidas and offers wealth and power in exchange for his surrender. Leonidas declines, and the battle continues. Meanwhile, Ephialtes awakes from his suicide attempt and decides to betray the Greeks by telling the Persians about the existence of a small pass that allows Xerxes to attack them from behind.

Learning of the Persian maneuvers, the Greeks realized their position was indefensible, but the Spartans and a few others refused to retreat. Before engaging the Persians for the last time, Leonidas orders one Spartan (Dilios) to return home so that he might survive and tell their story.

On the third day, Xerxes has the Spartans surrounded, and their remaining allies (Thespians) are already dead. He gives Leonidas one final chance to surrender and kneel to him. After some hesitation, Leonidas finally complies, throws down his arms, and kneels. This, however, is a trick by Leonidas and signals Stelios, a loyal Spartan soldier, to jump from his back and kill a general. The Spartans fight. Leonidas throws his spear at Xerxes, intending to make the "God-King" bleed, and succeeds. The Spartans are killed to the last man by a storm of arrows.

The story then shifts about a year later and ends as now-Captain Dilios relates the heroic sacrifice of Leonidas and his Spartan comrades to his troops before the historic Battle of Plataea.

== Criticisms ==
Writer Alan Moore has criticized 300 as being historically inaccurate, with particular reference to the characters' attitudes towards homosexuality:

There was just one particular line in it where one of the Spartan soldiers—I'll remind you, this is Spartans that we're talking about—one of them was talking disparagingly about the Athenians, and said, ‘Those boy-lovers.' You know, I mean, read a book, Frank. The Spartans were famous for something other than holding the bridge at Thermopylae, they were quite famous for actually enforcing man-boy love amongst the ranks as a way of military bonding. That specific example probably says more about Frank's grasp of history than it does about his grasp of homosexuality, so I'm not impugning his moral situation there. I'm not saying it was homophobic; just wasn't very well researched.

Miller, in the letters page of the series, replied to accusations of homophobia from a reader regarding the phrase "Those boy-lovers":

If I allowed my characters to express only my own attitudes and beliefs, my work would be pretty darn boring. If I wrote to please grievance groups, my work would be propaganda.

For the record: being a warrior class, the Spartans almost certainly did practice homosexuality. There's also evidence they tended to lie about it. It's not a big leap to postulate that they ridiculed their hedonistic Athenian rivals for something they themselves did. "Hypocrisy" is, after all, a word we got from the Greeks. What's next? A letter claiming that, since the Spartans owned slaves and beat their young, I do the same?

The times we live in.

Writer David Brin has also criticized 300 as being historically inaccurate, with particular reference to the bravery and efficacy of the non-Spartan Greeks:

That Athenian triumph deserves a movie! And believe me, it weighed heavily on the real life Leonidas, ten years later. 300 author Frank Miller portrays the Spartans' preening arrogance in the best possible light, as a kind of endearing tribal machismo. Miller never hints at the underlying reason for Leonidas's rant, a deep current of smoldering shame over how Sparta sat out Marathon, leaving it to Athenian amateurs, like the playwright Aeschylus, to save all of Greece. The "shopkeepers" whom Leonidas outrageously and ungratefully despises in the film.

During the Battle of Marathon, ten years previous to Thermopylae, the Spartans had been obligated to honor the Carneia, a religious festival during which military engagements were forbidden. Once the religious prohibition was lifted, the Spartan troops covered the 220 kilometers (140 mi) to Athens in a quick three days and arrived only one day after the battle had taken place. The Spartans toured the battlefield at Marathon, and agreed that the Athenians had won a great victory. Xerxes' invasion happened to coincide yet again with the celebration of the Carneia. This time, however, the Spartans chose not to hold back their entire army in deference to the festival, but instead sent an advance force of 300 men under Leonidas, who were to be reinforced by a full contingent of Spartan warriors after the festival concluded. It is impossible to know for certain whether this change in policy regarding the Carneia was based in shame about missing Marathon (as Brin suggests) or merely marked a reinterpretation of the military threat posed by the invading Persians. All Herodotus tells us is that the Spartan officials did not think that the engagement at Thermopylae would be decided so quickly and intended the main part of their force to arrive before the fighting broke out.

Writer Kieron Gillen's series Three is a riposte to Miller's 300. While Gillen is explicit that he admires 300, his work is an attempt to restore the presence of the helots, a slave tribe/caste absent from Miller's telling to the story of Sparta, and so question the heroism of the Spartans and their ownership of their victories, as well as challenge the discourse of freedom and its defence expressed by the Spartans, and by Miller.

== References in other works ==
There are references to the Battle at Thermopylae in several of Frank Miller's other comic books. In Sin City: The Big Fat Kill, Dwight McCarthy considers Leonidas' choice of "where to fight" and manages to loosely recreate the Spartan defense tactics by cornering the enemy gang in a tight alley; they then annihilate them with heavy gunfire and explosives. Also in Hell and Back when Wallace is drugged he sees his friend as Leonidas with a machine gun. In The Dark Knight Returns and The Dark Knight Strikes Again, Miller's "omega" Batman stories, there are references to a character named "Hot Gates" (the literal translation of Thermopylae), an adult film star who first makes a version of Snow White, and then declares herself Dictator of Ohio.

In the Emmy Award-winning episode "Jack and the Spartans" of the cartoon Samurai Jack, Jack meets a group of Spartan warriors fighting Aku's minions. This episode was partially inspired by Miller's comics.

== Film adaptation ==
In 2007, Zack Snyder directed a film adaptation of 300 with Frank Miller serving as executive producer to adapt his work for film. It used greenscreen technology to capture the comic book feel; the film is in fact notable for remaining extremely faithful to its source material as a result. It was released in both conventional cinemas and IMAX in 2007. In 2014, a sequel, 300: Rise of an Empire, was made, which is based on Frank Miller's mini-series Xerxes.

== Video game adaptation ==
A video game based on the movie and the graphic novel was released in 2007.

== Collected editions ==
- ISBN 1-56971-402-9 Hardcover, 88 pages, Dark Horse Comics
