= Kelly Craig =

Canadian actress and model

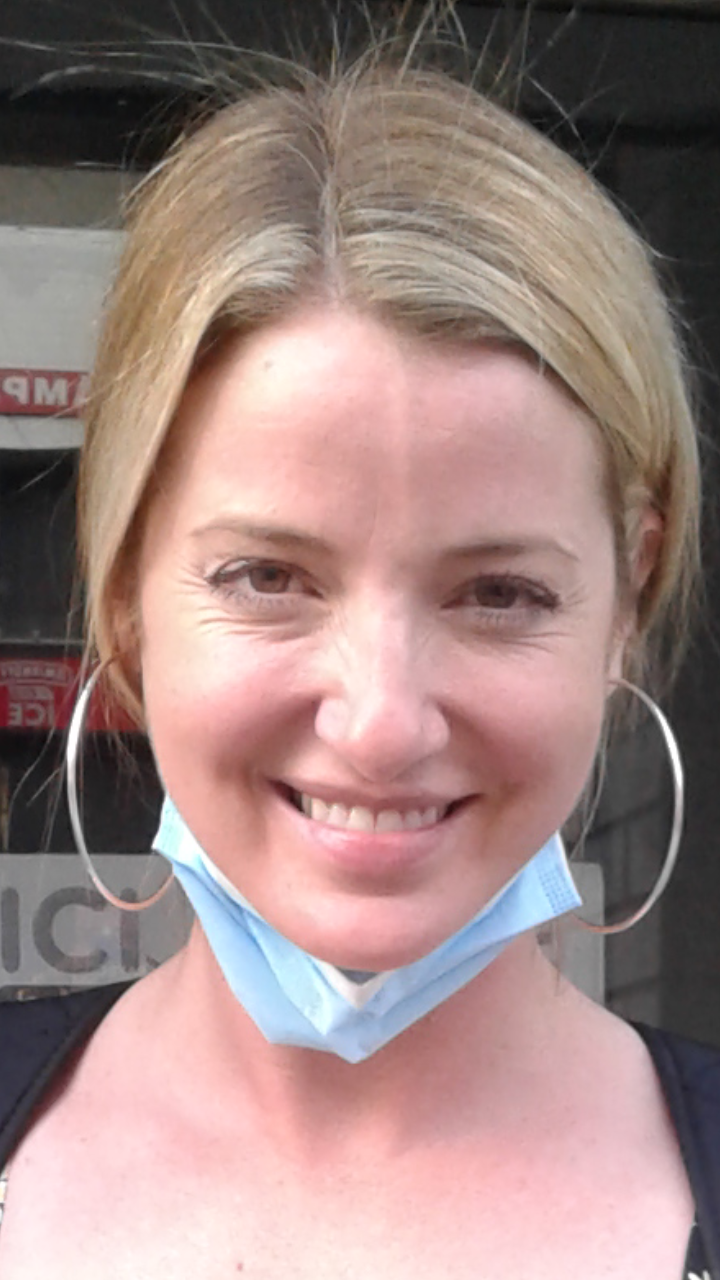
- Craig in 2021
- Occupations: Actress; model
- Years active: 2000–present

Kelly Craig is a model and actress.

Best known for her work in modeling, she was featured in the April 2006 edition of Elle Canada and Elle Québec.

Her first film role was as a stunt double for fellow model and actress Bridget Moynahan, in the 2000 film Coyote Ugly. However, her first character role was in the 2006 film adaptation of Frank Miller's 1998 graphic novel 300.

In 300, she played the role of the Oracle, a young Spartan girl who was chosen for her beauty and is guarded by the old Ephors, being frequently molested by them. Her words, spoken in a trance, are interpreted by the corrupt priests as a message that the Gods do not want King Leonidas to break the Carneia and attack the Persians. Although she appears only briefly in the film, a still from the film of her in a state of trance is featured as the sole image on one of the film posters.

== Filmography ==
Year	Title	Role	Notes
2006	300	Oracle Girl	Film
2017	Eye on Juliet	Abbey	Film
2018	Separated at Birth	Shelby	TV Movie
2018	The Detectives	Mary Smith	TV Series (1 episode)
2018	Fatal Vows	Sherry	TV Series (1 episode)
2020	The Bold Type	Caitlyn	TV Series (1 episode)
2020	I Want to Be Like You	C-801 to C-806	Short
2021	Two Wrongs	Caroline	TV Series (1 episode)
2022	Transplant	Truck Driver	TV Series (1 episode)
2022	Ghosts	Olga	TV Series (1 episode)
