= Goemon =

Goemon may refer to:

- Ishikawa Goemon (1558–1594), legendary ninja warrior and bandit hero
- Goemon Ishikawa XIII, his fictional descendant, created by Monkey Punch for his manga series Lupin III
- Goemon (film), a 2009 film by Kazuaki Kiriya
- Ganbare Goemon, a video game series
- Koji Nakagawa, a Japanese wrestler who previously wrestled as Goemon
