= Sky Captain and the World of Tomorrow =

2004 science fiction action-adventure film by Kerry Conran

- Theatrical release poster
- Directed by: Kerry Conran
- Written by: Kerry Conran
- Produced by: Jon Avnet; Sadie Frost; Jude Law; Marsha Oglesby
- Starring: Gwyneth Paltrow; Jude Law; Giovanni Ribisi; Michael Gambon; Bai Ling; Omid Djalili; Angelina Jolie
- Cinematography: Eric Adkins
- Edited by: Sabrina Plisco
- Music by: Edward Shearmur
- Production companies: Brooklyn Films II; Riff Raff Entertainment; Blue Flower; Filmauro
- Distributed by: Paramount Pictures (United States and United Kingdom); Filmauro Distribuzione (Italy)
- Release date: September 17, 2004
- Running time: 107 minutes
- Countries: United Kingdom; Italy; United States
- Language: English
- Budget: $70 million
- Box office: $57.9 million

Sky Captain and the World of Tomorrow (often shortened to Sky Captain) is a 2004 science fiction action-adventure film written and directed by Kerry Conran in his directorial debut, and produced by Jon Avnet, Sadie Frost, Jude Law and Marsha Oglesby. It stars Law, Gwyneth Paltrow, and Angelina Jolie.

Conran spent four years making a black and white teaser using a bluescreen set up in his living room and a Macintosh IIci. He was able to show it to Avnet, who was so impressed that Avnet spent two years working with him on his screenplay. No major studio was interested, but Avnet convinced Aurelio De Laurentiis to finance Sky Captain without a distribution deal (a worldwide distribution deal would later happen with Paramount Pictures).

Almost 100 digital artists, modelers, animators, and compositors created the multi-layered 2D and 3D backgrounds for the live-action footage, while the entire film was sketched out via hand-drawn storyboards and then recreated as CGI animatics. Ten months prior to shooting the live-action scenes, Conran first shot them with stand-ins in Los Angeles, then converted that footage to animatics so the actors could accurately envision the film.

Sky Captain received positive reviews, particularly for the style of filming that was used, though there was some criticism being directed at the plot and characterization. Despite being a box-office flop, generating only $57.9 million on a $70 million budget, the film has since gained a following and is regarded as a cult classic. It was one of the first major films, along with Casshern, Immortal (both 2004) and Sin City (2005), to be shot entirely on a "digital backlot", blending actors with CG surroundings.

== Plot ==
In a technologically advanced New York City in 1939, the zeppelin Hindenburg III moors itself atop the Empire State Building. Aboard the airship is Dr. Jorge Vargas, a scientist who arranges for a package containing two vials to be delivered to Dr. Walter Jennings. Afterwards, Dr. Vargas vanishes.

Polly Perkins, a reporter for The Chronicle, is looking into the disappearances of Vargas and five other renowned scientists. A cryptic message leads her to Radio City Music Hall, against the warnings of her editor, Mr. Paley, where she meets Dr. Jennings during a showing of The Wizard of Oz. He tells her that a Dr. Totenkopf is coming for him next. Suddenly, mysterious giant robots attack the city. The authorities call for "Sky Captain" Joe Sullivan, the city's hero, Perkins' former lover, and the commander of the mercenary air force the Flying Legion. While Joe engages the robots with his modified Curtiss P-40 pursuit fighter, Perkins photographs from the street with little regard for her safety. He disables one robot; the rest leave. News reports show similar attacks around the globe. The disabled robot is taken back to the Legion's air base so that technology expert Dex can examine it. Polly follows and persuades Joe to reluctantly let her in on the investigation.

She discovers Dr. Totenkopf was a former child prodigy and Germany's most brilliant scientist who ran a mysterious lab outside of Berlin where he and the missing scientists were working on a project dubbed the "World of Tomorrow". Her information takes them to the ransacked laboratory of a dying Dr. Jennings, while an assassin escapes. Just before he dies, Jennings gives Polly the two vials and states that they are crucial to Totenkopf's plans. Polly hides the vials and withholds the information from Joe. They return to the Legion's base just before it comes under attack from squadrons of ornithopter drones. Dex tracks the origin of the signal controlling the drones and notes it on a map before his capture.

Joe and Polly find Dex's map and fly to Nepal and then Tibet, where they meet Joe's old friend Kaji. He helps them locate an abandoned mining outpost in the Himalayas. Two guides working for Totenkopf force Polly to turn over the vials, locking the duo in a room full of dynamite. Joe and Polly escape just before the room explodes, knocking them unconscious and destroying most of Polly's film. They wake up together in the mythical Shangri-La. The Tibetan-speaking monks there tell of Totenkopf's enslavement of their people, forcing them to work in the uranium mines. Most were killed by the radiation, but the final survivor provides a clue to where Dr. Totenkopf is hiding.

With insufficient fuel to make it there, they run into a Royal Navy flying aircraft carrier commanded by another of Joe's former flames, Commander Franky Cook. Franky leads the attack on Totenkopf's island lair while Joe and Polly enter through an underwater inlet. Joe and Polly find themselves on an island with dinosaur-like creatures, which Polly hesitates to photograph as she has only two shots left. They find a secret subterranean facility in a mountain, where robots are loading animals, as well as the mysterious vials, onto a large "Noah's Ark" rocket. Joe and Polly are detected but Dex, piloting a flying barge, arrives with three of the missing scientists. They explain that Totenkopf has given up on humanity and seeks to start the world over again: the "World of Tomorrow". The vials are genetic material from humanity's greatest individuals which will produce the perfect Adam and Eve. If the rocket reaches space, the afterburners will ignite the atmosphere and kill everything on Earth, before the rocket repopulates the planet in Totenkopf's image.

As the group attempts to enter Dr. Totenkopf's lair, one scientist is electrocuted by the defense system. A hologram of Totenkopf appears, speaking of his hate for humanity and his plans to rebuild it as a new master race. Dex disables the lair's defenses and the group discovers Totenkopf's mummified corpse inside with a scrap of paper clutched in his hand: "forgive me". He died 20 years previously, but his machines have continued his plan. Joe decides to sabotage the rocket from the inside while the others escape. Polly tries to tag along but Joe kisses her and then knocks her out. Polly recovers, following Joe and saving him from Dr. Jennings' assassin, a female android. Joe and Polly then board the rocket. Before the rocket reaches 100 km, when its second stage is scheduled to fire and thereby incinerate the Earth, Polly pushes an emergency button that ejects all the animals in escape pods. Joe tries to disable the rocket only to be interrupted by the same assassin robot. He jolts the robot with its electric weapon and then uses it on the controls, disabling the rocket. Joe and Polly use the last pod to save themselves as the rocket explodes. Joe and Polly watch the animal pods splash down around their escape pod, while Commander Cook leads a group of flying aircraft carriers towards them. Polly then uses the last shot on her camera to take a picture of Joe rather than the animal pods. Joe notes that she had forgotten to take the lens cap off.

== Cast ==
- Jude Law as Joseph Sullivan/Sky Captain: He commands a private air force known as the Flying Legion. His personal aircraft is a modified Curtiss P-40D. In 2002, producer Jon Avnet showed Law the teaser trailer and the actor was very impressed by what he saw. He remembers, "All I got at that early stage was that he'd used pretty advanced and unused technology to create a very retrospective look". Avnet gave him the script to read and some preliminary artwork at which to look. Law said "What was clear was also that at the center was a really great cinematic relationship, which you could put into any genre and it would work. You know, the kind of bickering [relationship]. I always like to call it The African Queen meets Buck Rogers." Avnet wanted to work with Law because he knew that the actor had "worked both period, who worked both having theatrical experience, who worked on blue screen, who hadn't hit yet as a major action star." Law had just finished filming Cold Mountain (2003) and was intrigued by switching from on-location filming to filming completely on a soundstage. Sky Captain would be one of three Jude Law films released by Paramount Pictures in 2004, along with the remake of Alfie (2004) and Lemony Snicket's A Series of Unfortunate Events (2004). It also was one of six overall Jude Law films released that year.
- Gwyneth Paltrow as Polly Perkins, reporter for the New York Chronicle. Law believed so much in Conran's movie that he became one of the producers and used his clout to get Paltrow involved. Once she was suggested for the role, Law did not remember "any other name coming up. It just seems that she was perfect. She was as enthusiastic about the script and about the visual references that were sort of put to her, and jumped on board." Paltrow said in an interview, "I thought that this is the time to do a movie like this where it's kind of breaking into new territory and it's not your basic formulaic action-adventure movie."
- Angelina Jolie as Commander Francesca "Franky" Cook, commander of a Royal Navy flying aircraft carrier. Jolie had just arrived from the set of Lara Croft: Tomb Raider – The Cradle of Life (2003) and agreed to work on the movie for three days. Despite her small role, she reportedly had conducted hours of interviews with fighter pilots to absorb their jargon and get a feel for the role.
- Giovanni Ribisi as Dexter "Dex" Dearborn, ace mechanic of the Flying Legion. Ribisi met with Avnet and was not sure he wanted to do the movie; however, after seeing the teaser trailer, he signed on without hesitation.
- Michael Gambon as Mr. Paley, editor of the New York Chronicle newspaper
- Omid Djalili as Kaji, former comrade-in-arms from the Flying Legion
- Bai Ling as The Mysterious Woman, Totenkopf's henchwoman, who is also a gynoid
- Julian Curry as Dr. Jorge Vargas, a missing scientist
- Trevor Baxter as Dr. Walter Jennings, a scientist
- Peter Law as Dr. Kessler, a missing scientist. Peter Law is the father of Jude Law.
- Khan Bonfils as one of the double-agent guides working for Totenkopf (identified in the credits as "Creepy"; the other guide is "Scary")

Laurence Olivier had been deceased for nearly 13 years at the time of filming and was depicted in the film for the role of Dr. Totenkopf, the mysterious mad scientist and supervillain via computer manipulation of video and audio from when he was a young actor. The novelization written by Kevin J. Anderson gives the full names for Dex and Editor Paley as Dexter Dearborn and Morris Paley.

== Production ==
=== Background ===
Kerry Conran grew up on films and comic books of the 1930s and 1940s. His parents encouraged him and his brother Kevin to develop their creative sides. He studied at a feeder program for Disney animators at CalArts and became interested in 2-D computer animation. While there, he realized it was possible to apply some of the techniques associated with animation to live-action. Two years later, it seemed apparent to him that Hollywood would never take a chance on an inexperienced, first-time filmmaker, so he decided to make the movie himself.

=== Influences ===
Conran was influenced by the designs of Norman Bel Geddes, an industrial designer who did work for the 1933 Chicago World's Fair and designed exhibits for the 1939 New York World's Fair. Geddes also designed an Airliner Number 4 that was to fly from Chicago to London.

Another key influence was Hugh Ferriss, one of the designers for the 1939 New York World's Fair who designed bridges and huge housing complexes. He was an American delineator (one who creates perspective drawings of buildings) and architect. In 1922, skyscraper architect Harvey Wiley Corbett commissioned to draw a series of four step-by-step perspectives demonstrating the architectural consequences of the 1916 Zoning Resolution. These four drawings would later be used in his 1929 book The Metropolis of Tomorrow (Dover Publications, 2005, ISBN 0-486-43727-2).

Regarding the 1939 New York World's Fair itself and its futuristic theme of the World of Tomorrow, Conran noted: "... obviously the title refers to the World Expo and the spirit of that was looking at the future with a sense of optimism and a sense of the whimsical, you know, something that we've lost a lot in our fantasies. We're more cynical, more practical, ... I think what this film attempts to do is to take that enthusiasm and innocence and celebrate it-to not get mired in the practicality that we're fixated upon today."

Conran acknowledged his debt to German Expressionism, which was particularly evident in the opening scenes in New York City: "Early German cinema was born of just a completely different aesthetic than what we see nowadays. One of the last things I watched before starting this project was the Dr. Mabuse series that Lang had done—terribly inspirational, the use of art and propaganda even."

Conran summarized his influences: "We tried to approach it almost as though we lived in that era and were just another group of artists trying to make a work out of those pieces and inspirations. We wanted the film to feel like a lost film of that era. If we're a footnote in the history of pulp art and Golden Age comics, that'd be enough, that'd be great. If we even just inspire some people to go back and investigate some of that stuff, we'd have done enough."

Sky Captain has a number of commonalities with Hayao Miyazaki's anime movie Laputa: Castle in the Sky (1986). The sky pirates' focus on primitive mechanics, large airships, and military cultures is similar. Both stories center on an evil madman controlling an island of high technology, and the search for that island. Laputa has the evil madman searching for the island, but Sky Captain has the island as the madman's base from the beginning. Sky Captain's message is largely about the film genre, but Laputa has strong anti-war and anti-technology themes, found in most of Miyazaki's work. Both pay homage to the 1941 Superman animated short The Mechanical Monsters.

=== Teaser trailer ===
In 1994, Conran began assembling moviemaking tools, including a bluescreen in his living room. He was not interested in working his way through the system and instead wanted to follow the route of independent filmmakers like Steven Soderbergh. Initially, Kerry and his brother had nothing more than "just a vague idea of this guy who flew a plane. We would talk about all the obvious things like Indiana Jones and all the stuff we liked." Conran spent four years making a black and white teaser trailer in the style of an old-fashioned movie serial on his Macintosh IIci personal computer. Once finished, Conran showed it to producer Marsha Oglesby, who was a friend of his brother's wife and she recommended that he let producer Jon Avnet see it. Conran met Avnet and showed him the trailer. Conran told him that he wanted to make it into a movie. They spent two or three days just talking about the tone of the movie.

=== Pre-production ===
Avnet and Conran spent two years working on the screenplay, which included numerous genre-related references and homages, and developing a working relationship. Then, the producer took the script and the trailer and began approaching actors. In order to protect Conran's vision, Avnet decided to shoot the movie independently with a lot of his own money. The producer realized that "the very thing that made this film potentially so exciting for me, and I think for an audience, was the personal nature of it and the singularity of the vision, which would never succeed and never survive the development process within a studio."

Avnet convinced Aurelio De Laurentiis, through his company Filmauro, to finance the film without a distribution deal (Paramount Pictures would later acquire worldwide distribution rights to the film). Nine months before filming, Avnet had Conran meet the actors and begin rehearsals in an attempt to get the shy filmmaker out of his shell. Avnet set up a custom digital effects studio with a blue screen soundstage in an abandoned building in Van Nuys, California. A group of almost 100 digital artists, modelers, animators, and compositors created multi-layered 2D and 3D backgrounds for the live action footage yet to be filmed.

The entire movie was sketched out via hand-drawn storyboards and then re-created as computer-generated 3D animatics with all of the 2D background photographs digitally painted to resemble the 1939 setting. With the animatics as a guide, grids were created to map camera and actor movements with digital characters standing in for the real actors. The grids were made into actual maps on the blue screen stage floor to help the actors move around invisible scenery.

Ten months before Conran made the movie with his actors, he shot it entirely with stand-ins in Los Angeles and then created the whole movie in animatics so that the actors had an idea of what the film would look like and where to move on the soundstage. To prepare for the film, Conran had his cast watch old movies, such as Lauren Bacall in To Have and Have Not (1944) for Paltrow's performance and The Thin Man (1934) for the relationship between Nick and Nora that was to be echoed in the one between Joe and Polly. Avnet constantly pushed for room in this meticulously designed movie for the kind of freedom the actors needed, like being able to move around on the soundstage.

=== Principal photography and post-production ===
Conran and Avnet were able to cut costs considerably by shooting the entire movie in 26 days — far less than the three-to-four month schedules usually allotted to blockbuster films — on high-definition video using a Sony HDW-F900 and working on three blue screens, mainly on Stage 2 (George Lucas Stage) at Elstree Studios in London, England with one notable exception. Conran wrote a scene that was added later in which Polly talks to her editor in his office that was shot on a physical set because there was no time to shoot it on a blue screen soundstage. The footage from the HD camera was run through a switcher and then through a Macintosh computer running Final Cut Pro that allowed the filmmakers to line up the animatics with the live onstage footage. Conran said that without this innovation, "I don't know how we would have made this movie. It's really what allowed us to line up everything, given there was nothing there." After each day of shooting, footage was edited and sent overnight to editors in Los Angeles who added CG and sent it back.

After filming ended, they put together a 24-minute presentation and took it to every studio in June 2003. There was a lot of interest and Avnet selected the studio that gave Conran the most creative control. They needed studio backing to finish the film's ambitious visuals. At one point, the producer remembers that Conran was "working 18 to 20 hours a day for a long period of time. It's 2,000 some odd CG shots done in one year, and we literally had to write code to figure out how to do this stuff!" Most of the post-production work was done on Mac workstations using After Effects for compositing and Final Cut Pro for editing (seven workstations were dedicated to visual effects and production editing). The distinctive look of the film was achieved by running footage through a diffusion filter and then tinting it in black and white before color was blended, balanced and added back in.

Laurence Olivier, who died in 1989, posthumously appears as the villain and mad scientist Dr. Totenkopf. His likeness was produced using digitally manipulated archival BBC footage of the actor and thus adding one more film to his repertoire. A similar technique was used two years later in Superman Returns (2006) with Marlon Brando.

Avnet cultivated a calculated release for the movie by first moving its release date from mid-2004, one week before Spider-Man 2, to September. He courted the Internet press and finally made an appearance at San Diego Comic-Con with key cast members in an attempt to generate some advance buzz.

== Soundtrack ==
Sky Captain and the World of Tomorrow (Original Motion Picture Soundtrack)

Soundtrack album by Edward Shearmur
- Released: September 7, 2004 (original), September 12, 2017 (expanded)
- Genre: Soundtrack
- Labels: Sony (original), La-La Land Records (expanded)

Professional ratings
Review scores
Source	Rating
AllMusic	3/5 stars
Empire	3/5 stars
Filmtracks	4/5 stars
Movie Wave	4/5 stars
ScoreNotes	8/10 stars
SoundtrackNet	4.5/5 stars

The composer Edward Shearmur wrote the film's orchestral score in the style of Hollywood's golden-age composers, and the film's end-title sequence featured a new recording of the song "Over the Rainbow" sung by the American jazz singer Jane Monheit, which were all featured on Sony Classical's original motion picture soundtrack recording. La-La Land Records released a limited edition 2-disc set in 2017 with the complete score.

=== Sony Classical track listing ===
1. "The World of Tomorrow" – 1:07
2. "The Zeppelin Arrives" – 1:53
3. "The Robot Army" – 3:01
4. "Calling Sky Captain" – 3:26
5. "Back at the Base" – 2:49
6. "The Flying Wings Attack" – 6:31
7. "An Aquatic Escape" – 2:29
8. "Flight to Nepal" – 4:38
9. "Treacherous Journey" – 2:22
10. "Dynamite" – 2:26
11. "Three in a Bed" – 0:57
12. "Finding Frankie" – 5:02
13. "Manta Squadron" – 6:33
14. "h-770-d" – 1:14
15. "Flying Lizard" – 1:06
16. "Totenkopf's Ark" – 5:01
17. "Back to Earth" – 3:14
18. "Over the Rainbow" – 3:54

== Release ==
Sky Captain and the World of Tomorrow had high box office expectations, opening in first place on its September 17, 2004 release date and grossing US$15.5 million on its opening weekend. However, the film only grossed $37.7 million in North America, below its estimated $70 million budget. It grossed $20.1 million in the rest of the world, making its final worldwide tally $57.9 million. The film is considered a box office flop.

Production designer Kevin Conran, brother of director Kerry Conran, disputed this budget figure in a 2015 interview: "I take great issue with that [budget figure] personally and I'd like someone to show me where all that money went ... I don't support those numbers and I never have. We walked into Jon Avnet's office that first day and he said, 'What do you want for the production?' and we said $3 million. We could have done a version of this film for $3 million. It would have been black-and-white and sans name actors ... But even still, this whole thing was going to be under $20 million. How it went from 20 to 70, you tell me."

== Reception ==
On Rotten Tomatoes, the film has an approval rating of 71% based on 221 reviews, with an average rating of 6.8/10. The site's critical consensus states: "Sky Captain and the World of Tomorrow is slim on plot and characterization, but the visuals more than make up for it". On Metacritic the film has a score of 64 out of 100 based on reviews from 36 critics, indicating "Generally favourable reviews". Audiences surveyed by CinemaScore gave the film a grade B− on scale of A to F.

The Canadian network Space awarded it the 2005 Spacey Award for Best Science Fiction/Fantasy Film. Roger Ebert was among those who strongly supported the film, giving it a four out of a possible four stars and praising it for "its heedless energy and joy, it reminded me of how I felt the first time I saw Raiders of the Lost Ark. It's like a film that escaped from the imagination directly onto the screen, without having to pass through reality along the way". The film is also one of few to be awarded five out of five stars by IGN FilmForce. In his review for the Chicago Reader, J.R. Jones wrote, "This debut feature by Kerry Conran is a triumph not only for its technical mastery but for its good taste". Entertainment Weekly gave the film an "A−" rating, saying, "The investment is optimistic and wise; Sky Captain is a gorgeous, funny, and welcome novelty".

Other critics' enthusiasm was somewhat tempered. For instance, Stephen Holden of The New York Times lauded its visuals and its evocation of a bygone era but said that "the monochromatic variations on sepia keep the actors and their adventures at a refined aesthetic distance ... At times the film is hard to see. And as the action accelerates, the wonder of its visual concept starts giving way to sci-fi clichés". USA Today said that the film was "all style over substance, a clever parlor trick but a dull movie". Stephen Hunter, of The Washington Post, called it "a $70 million novelty item".

== Homages ==
First-time director Conran incorporated many references to classic genre films into his own movie:

The work of those artists and writers from the pulps and Golden Age of Comic Books like Airboy was really the template for us. To some extent we stole from it, to some extent we expanded on it – hopefully we added enough of our own sensibility. We tried to approach it almost as though we lived in that era and were just another group of artists trying to make a work comprised of those pieces and inspirations. We wanted the film to feel like a lost film of that era.

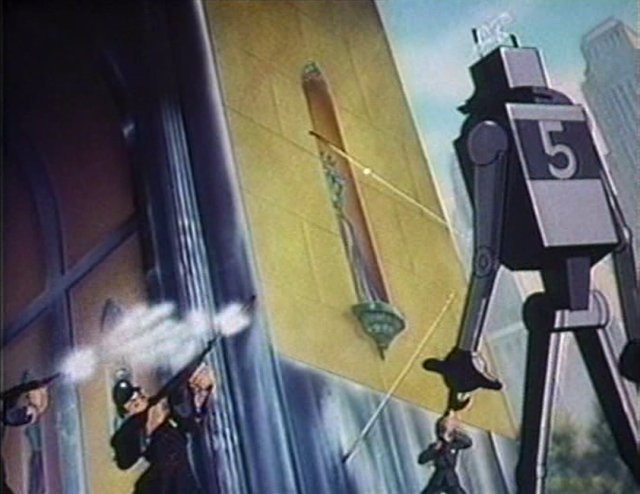
Robot #5 terrorizes the city in The Mechanical Monsters (1941).

The army of giant robots seen in the film – both flying over the city and later various models in Sky Captain's massive warehouse, particularly one designated as number "5" – are a homage to the Paramount Pictures Superman cartoon The Mechanical Monsters (1941), produced by Fleischer Studios. The radio signal tower calling for Sky Captain is a stylized version of the color RKO logo (the film was released after RKO's successor, RKO General, sold off their TV stations as a result of corporate misconduct). The giant robots heat rays use the same sound effects as the Martian flying machines from the 1953 version of The War of the Worlds.

When early in the film newspaper clippings from around the globe are shown, in the Japanese newspaper the iconic silhouette of Godzilla is clearly visible. Similarly, during the New York sequence when Sky Captain deploys a bomb to stop a giant robot, the shape of King Kong can be seen on the Empire State Building in the background. During the underwater dogfight sequence, a light momentarily displays the wreckage of a ship with the name Venture – the tramp steamer that sailed to Skull Island in the 1933 version of King Kong. The same scene shows what appears to be the wreckage of the RMS Titanic, and an ancient underwater city which seems to be a nod to the legend of Atlantis.

The villain's main logo bears striking similarities to the logo for Crimson Skies, a game universe that some critics noted bears stylistic and plot similarities to the film.

=== Pulp magazines and comic books ===
The Flying Legion is a homage to pulp magazine and comic book heroes such as G-8 and his Battle Aces, Captain Midnight, and the Blackhawk squadron. Production designer Kevin Conran, the brother of director Kerry Conran, based the design of the flying humanoid robots, in part, on the helmet worn by the DC Comics superhero Adam Strange and the flight controls for Commando Cody's rocket-pack.

== See also ==
- Crimson Skies
- Decopunk
- Dieselpunk
- Pulp magazine
- Retro-futurism
