= Kerry Conran =

American film director and screenwriter

- Born: Kerry Scott Conran; Flint, Michigan, United States
- Occupation(s): Film director, screenwriter
- Known for: Sky Captain and the World of Tomorrow (2004)

Kerry Scott Conran is an American film director and screenwriter, best known for creating and directing the 2004 pulp science fiction film Sky Captain and the World of Tomorrow.

== Early life and influences ==
Conran was born in Flint, Michigan. He was educated at the California Institute of the Arts. He grew up watching such classic adventure movies and serials as King Kong, Lost Horizon, Metropolis, and Flash Gordon on a local television channel.

He was impressed by the whimsy and imagination of these films. He explained in an interview with John Joseph Adams that the adventure films of the 1930s era were not limited by what was practical, but only by the imaginations of the creators. He stated that he found this element lacking in most modern adventure films, which he described as "almost too well informed... and more cynical". As a result, he had aspired ever since his childhood to create an adventure film or serial in the same vein as the aforementioned escapist adventures of the 1930s. He spent much of his childhood making short super-8 movies. Upon becoming an adult, he entered the California Institute of Arts. Although he was enrolled in a live-action course, he became enamored with the abilities of those in animation courses to create whatever was in their imagination. He realized that they were not bound by such things as practicality or the rules of physics, but only by their imaginations. As a result, he devised the idea of making a film with live actors, but computer-generated backgrounds.

== Career ==
When he had fully figured out how he was going to go about making the movie, he enlisted the help of his brother Kevin and a few friends. At first, he planned to make a feature-length seven-chapter serial, which he would release independently. He eventually decided to make only a six-minute teaser instead, as it would take him several decades to create the backgrounds for a full-length feature. He set up a blue-screen in his apartment, and some of his friends acted in the roles. He created the backgrounds for the black and white short over the course of four years with his Mac computer. He could not afford better equipment, so he used equipment given him in payment for projects that he worked on, such as desktop publishing of articles. His computer (including the equipment he earned) was outdated and slow. He dropped out of society, and spent all of his free time creating the short, working only enough to support himself and his project. He later remarked that he "had no life", and would sometimes hide under his desk in a fetal position, feeling tempted to give up on his project.

He modeled the tone and visuals of the short on the cinematography in The Third Man, and based the look of the robots featured in the short on those in the Superman cartoon The Mechanical Monsters. The short took four years to complete. When finished, it was entitled Sky Captain and the Flying Legion In: The World of Tomorrow - Chapter One: The Mechanical Monsters, but it is usually referred to merely as The World of Tomorrow.

Kevin Conran invited Marsha Oglesby, a movie producer and friend of his wife, to look at the short. She was impressed by the scope and ambition of the short, especially as it was made entirely in Kerry Conran's apartment. She referred the Conran brothers to producer Jon Avnet, who agreed to help the Conran brothers make a feature-length film, and found funding for the project. Kerry Conran wrote and directed the feature-length film, entitled Sky Captain and the World of Tomorrow, Kevin Conran served as the concept artist, production designer, and costume designer, and his younger sister Kirsten served as art director. At first, Kerry Conran intended for the film to be a seven-part black and white serial, but Jon Avnet convinced him to make it without chapters, and in color. As a result, Kerry Conran and visual effects supervisor Darin Hollings developed a color style based on two-strip and three-strip Technicolor. Sky Captain and the World of Tomorrow was filmed, for the most part, entirely on blue-screen, with backgrounds, lighting, and other effects added in post-production. However, due to time and budget constraints, one set was partially built, and another was fully built. Sky Captain and the World of Tomorrow was released in 2004, by Paramount Pictures. It was given fairly favorable reviews by critics, but did not do well at the box office.

Afterwards, Conran was slated to direct John Carter of Mars, an adaptation of the Edgar Rice Burroughs novel A Princess of Mars, after having initially turned it down twice. Before production could commence, Sherry Lansing stepped down from Paramount and the studio had lost interest in the project. Conran, who had replaced Robert Rodriguez, was replaced by Jon Favreau after leaving the project. Paramount executives decided not to continue with the project, citing their desire to put their resources toward the Star Trek franchise. Disney then picked up the option for Pixar's Andrew Stanton to direct. Conran planned to work on an original project with friend and former schoolmate Robert Gordon. He has stated that he prefers to adapt original material.

Conran directed a 2006 Christmas-themed Coca-Cola commercial entitled The Greatest Gift, on which he served as production designer along with other key Sky Captain and the World of Tomorrow collaborators, including Eric Adkins and Erik Jessen.

In 2012, Conran and Sky Captain and the World of Tomorrow collaborator Stephen Lawes co-directed a short film written by Conran entitled Gumdrop. Sky Captain collaborators Jon Avnet, Marsha Oglesby, Sean Cushing, Todd Toon, and Kevin Chalk were also involved in making the short. Conran also worked on the 2012 proof of concept short film Monster Roll, along with Sky Captain collaborators Dan Blank (who directed the short), Eric Adkins, Erik Jessen, and Takashi Takeoka.

Conran at one point was to direct Truckers for DreamWorks Animation before the project was shelved. He was to also collaborate with Sam Raimi on an adaptation of The Shadow and a separate project based on Doc Savage. Sony Pictures, which held the rights to both characters, lost interest in both projects sometime afterwards. Following a string of films that failed to go into production, Conran opted to step away from the limelight, "I decided I was just going to disappear, I'd just do my own stuff, and that's basically what I've been doing. I've not been idle, I've been doing stuff that's more about the experimentation [of Sky Captain]." He is open to making more films and has shown some admiration towards the Marvel Cinematic Universe.

In his interview with John Joseph Adams, he stated: "I have always come at this from the perspective of filmmaking and developed the techniques used in this film out of necessity and never really sought to interest other computer aficionados". However, he did acknowledge that his film had indeed become influential, albeit unintentionally: "That wasn't really the intention. Whether or not that what evolved from this maybe... which is a possibility. The intention was to tell that particular story with those particular visuals that we used.... and if history says it’s something else....".
