= Backlot =

Outdoor annex to a movie studio for shooting exterior scenes

RKO Forty Acres, a former backlot in Culver City, California

A backlot is an area behind or adjoining a movie studio containing permanent exterior buildings for outdoor scenes in filmmaking or television productions, or space for temporary set construction.

== Uses ==
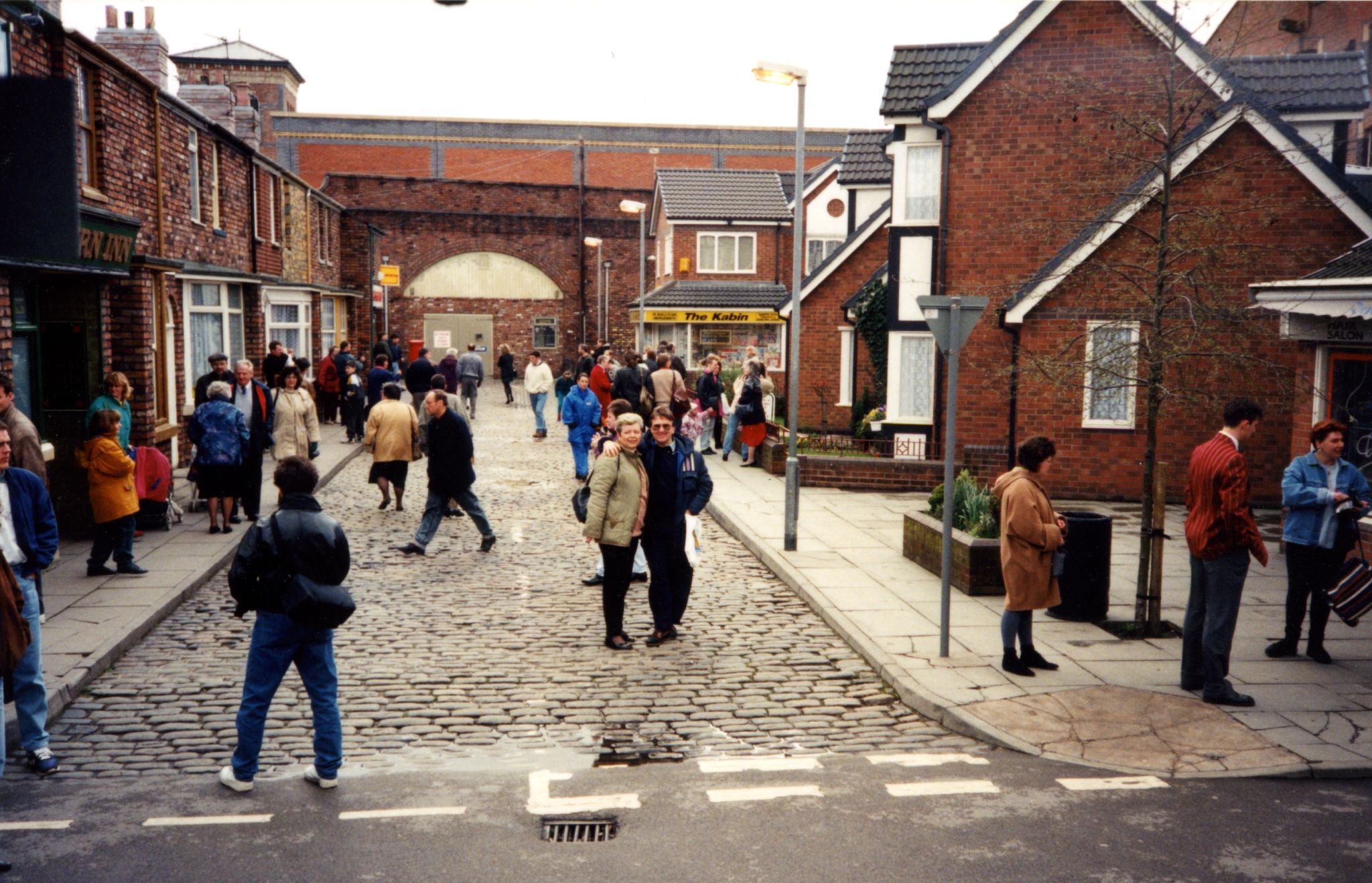
Coronation Street sets tour

Some movie studios build a wide variety of sets on the backlot, which can be modified for different purposes as need requires and "dressed" to resemble any time period or look. These sets include everything from mountains, forests, ships, to small-town settings from around the world, as well as streets from the Old West, to whole modern-day city blocks from New York City, Paris, Berlin, and London. There are streets that comprise an assortment of architectural styles, Victorian to suburban homes, and 19th century-style townhouses that encircle a central park with trees. An example of this is (the former) Warner Bros. Ranch in Burbank, California seen in the title sequence of Friends or, in the case of Universal Studios, the home of Norman Bates from the Hitchcock movie Psycho.

The shells, or façades, on a studio backlot are usually constructed with three sides and a roof, often missing the back wall and/or one of the side walls. The interior is an unfinished space, with no rooms, and from the back of the structure one can see the electrical wires, pipes, beams and scaffolding, which are fully exposed. Ladders are usually built into the structure, allowing performers to climb to an upper-floor window or the roof to perform scenes. Not all the buildings and houses are shells. Some are closed in with a fourth wall. When not otherwise in use, they serve as storage facilities for lighting and other production equipment. When in use, the structures are dressed by adding doors, window treatments and landscaping. L-shaped temporary walls are placed inside of doors to give the illusion of an interior. When not in use, the structures are usually stripped of this dressing.

Postmodern films such as Mel Brooks' Blazing Saddles and Kinji Fukasaku's Fall Guy, offered a rare, satirical look at the world behind the camera, and brought its audiences in for a behind-the-scenes tour of the Warner Bros. backlot and Toei's Kyoto Studios. Television shows such as Moonlighting and It's Garry Shandling's Show also broke the fourth wall, and gave audiences a peek at life on the other side of the camera.

Sets on a studio backlot are built to appear large, as if covering miles of ground on the big or small screen, while actually occupying only a few acres of the backlot.

At their peak, some backlots covered hundreds of acres around existing studios, and filmmakers rarely left the lot, as they would intercut the backlot shots with a handful of establishing shots filmed on location by a second unit.

== Demise ==
Today many studio backlots are gone or nearly gone. There are several reasons for this. Los Angeles, like the rest of the United States, went through an economic boom after World War II. This caused real estate prices (and property taxes linked to fair market value) to rise dramatically.

At the same time, during the 1950s, 1960s, and 1970s (the period when Hollywood underwent the transition from the Golden Age to New Hollywood), global movie audiences were increasingly irritated by films which were supposedly set all over the world, but obviously had been filmed in California. The primitive special effects technology of the era made it difficult to remove clear signs that a film had been shot in California, such as chaparral-covered hills at the horizon line. Audiences wanted to see actors in locations which were both exotic and authentic, not cheap Hollywood facsimiles. The mediocre box office performance of the 1967 film Camelot was blamed in part on this issue, which in turn marked the end of large-scale backlot production in Southern California.

By the early 1970s, the industry had transitioned to location shooting for the majority of outdoor scenes, and backlots were widely viewed as an obsolete, unwanted capital expenditure and a tax burden on studios. Many were razed and the land was either sold to developers or repurposed for theme parks (e.g., Universal Studios Hollywood) or office buildings (e.g., Century City). Since the late 1990s, the increased use of CGI and blue/green screen effects in big budget movies has accelerated the decline in the use of studio backlots, as more films are shot completely indoors.

== See also ==
- Cinema
- History of cinema
- Sound stage
- Movie ranch
- Location shooting
- Filming location
- Digital backlot
