= 300 (film) =

2006 film by Zack Snyder

- Theatrical release poster
- Directed by: Zack Snyder
- Screenplay by: Zack Snyder; Kurt Johnstad; Michael B. Gordon
- Based on: 300 by: Frank Miller; Lynn Varley
- Produced by: Gianni Nunnari; Mark Canton; Bernie Goldmann; Jeffrey Silver
- Starring: Gerard Butler; Lena Headey; David Wenham; Dominic West
- Cinematography: Larry Fong
- Edited by: William Hoy
- Music by: Tyler Bates
- Production companies: Warner Bros. Pictures; Legendary Pictures; Virtual Studios; Atmosphere Entertainment; Hollywood Gang Productions
- Distributed by: Warner Bros. Pictures
- Release dates: December 9, 2006 (Butt-Numb-A-Thon); March 9, 2007 (United States)
- Running time: 117 minutes
- Countries: United States; Canada
- Language: English
- Budget: $65 million
- Box office: $468.8 million

300 is a 2006 epic historical fantasy action film directed by Zack Snyder, who co-wrote the screenplay with Kurt Johnstad and Michael B. Gordon. Based on the 1998 Dark Horse Comics limited series of the same name by Frank Miller and Lynn Varley, the film, like its source material, is a retelling of the Battle of Thermopylae in the Greco-Persian Wars. The plot revolves around King Leonidas (Gerard Butler), who leads 300 Spartans into battle against the Persian "God-King" Xerxes (Rodrigo Santoro) and his invading army of more than 300,000 soldiers. As the battle rages, Queen Gorgo (Lena Headey) strives to rally support in Sparta for her husband. The film also features Michael Fassbender in his film debut.

The story is framed by a voice-over narrative by the Spartan soldier Dilios (David Wenham). As an unreliable narrator, Dilios introduces various historical inaccuracies and other fantastical elements, placing 300 within the genre of historical fantasy. 300 was filmed mostly with a superimposition chroma key technique to replicate the imagery of the original comics.

An unfinished cut of 300 premiered at the Austin Butt-Numb-A-Thon on December 9, 2006. The completed film then premiered at the Berlin International Film Festival on February 14, 2007, before being released in both conventional and IMAX screens in the United States on March 9, and on home media on July 31. The film received generally positive reviews from critics, who praised its visuals, action sequences, and style but received criticism from historians, who criticized its historical inaccuracies, most notably its depiction of the Persians, which some characterized as Persophobic. Grossing over $468.8 million, the film's opening was the 24th-largest in box office history at the time, and became the tenth highest-grossing film of 2007. The film earned a leading ten nominations at the 34th Saturn Awards, winning two for Best Action, Adventure, or Thriller Film and Best Director (for Snyder). A sequel, titled Rise of an Empire, based on Miller's previously unpublished graphic novel prequel Xerxes, was released on March 7, 2014.

== Plot ==
Dilios, a hoplite in the Spartan army, narrates the story of a Spartan king named Leonidas I from childhood to kingship through the Spartan child-rearing system and the Battle of Thermopylae.

A Persian herald enters Sparta one day, urging Leonidas to offer "earth and water" in submission to King Xerxes. Leonidas and the Spartan soldiers decline, throwing the herald, who insulted his wife Queen Gorgo, and his envoy into a bottomless pit. Visiting the Ephors, Leonidas proposes repelling the Persians through Thermopylae by funneling them into a narrow pass, allowing the Greeks' heavy infantry to defeat the numerically superior Persian light infantry. The Ephors warn Leonidas against waging war during the upcoming Carneia, and the Oracle corroborates their advice. As Leonidas angrily departs, an agent from Xerxes appears alongside a Spartan politician named Theron, who rewards the Ephors' covert support with gold and "fresh oracles".

Having been forbidden to mobilize Sparta's army, Leonidas gathers 300 soldiers, with many leaving behind sons to continue their name. Although they are confronted by Theron and the Council about defying the Ephors, they depart for the Hot Gates shortly afterwards. Joined by a few thousand Arcadians and their leader Daxos along with other Greeks, they traverse a village that was entirely pillaged by the Persians before reaching Thermopylae, where a storm sinks many Persian navy ships at the Aegean Sea. The Spartans then scout out a large Persian encampment and construct a wall using the bodies of slain Persian scouts as mortar. Meanwhile, Leonidas encounters Ephialtes, a deformed Spartan whose parents fled Sparta to avert certain infanticide. Looking to redeem his family name, Ephialtes details a secret goat path through which the Persians could outflank and surround the Spartans and requests to join Leonidas's army. Leonidas sympathetically declines, as despite Ephialtes' skilled thrust attack, his inability to raise his shield would compromise their phalanx formation.

Following their refusal to lay down their weapons, the Spartans utilize the narrowed pathway to repel many waves of the advancing Persian onslaught, including an arrow volley. Xerxes, impressed by their skills, personally approaches Leonidas and offers him immense wealth, power and control of all Greek forces. Leonidas declines, mocking the inferior quality of Xerxes' warriors. Xerxes sends in his elite guard, the Immortals, accompanied by the monstrous Über Immortal, but the Greeks triumph, suffering only a few Spartan casualties.

On the second day, Xerxes unsuccessfully dispatches new waves of detachments against the Spartans, including Slaves, war elephants, bombardiers, and an armored rhinoceros. Completely irate, he begins executing his own generals for their failures. Meanwhile, an embittered Ephialtes reveals the secret path to Xerxes in exchange for wealth, women, and a uniform. During the fight, Leonidas' loyal captain and friend Artemis suffers a personal tragedy when his eldest son Astinos is decapitated, compelling him to violently break formation and responsively kill several Persians in a vengeful, murderous rage. The Arcadians retreat upon learning of Ephialtes' betrayal, but Leonidas orders an injured but reluctant Dilios to return to Sparta and inform his compatriots of what has happened.

Gorgo approaches Theron for help in petitioning the Spartan Council for reinforcements, but Theron rapes her, and the following day, he treacherously attempts to defame her as an adulteress before the Council. Enraged, she kills him, revealing a bag of Xerxes' gold in his robe. Acknowledging his betrayal, the Council unanimously agrees in her favor. On the third day, the Persians, led by Ephialtes, traverse the secret path, encircling the Spartans. Xerxes' general and Ephialtes implore them to surrender, but the Spartans refuse, as Leonidas tells Ephialtes "May you live forever!" After a young, spirited and highly skilled Spartan soldier named Stelios kills the general, Xerxes commands his troops to attack, forcing Leonidas to throw his spear at him, which slices his face and proves his mortality. The remaining Spartans fight to the death, finally succumbing to an arrow barrage.

Inspired by Leonidas' sacrifice and Dilios' testimony before the Spartan Council, the Greeks mobilize an army, with Dilios heading the Spartan-led charge. After delivering a rousing emotional speech honoring King Leonidas and the 300 who sacrificed their lives a year prior, Dilios leads the Greeks into the Battle of Plataea against the Persians.

== Cast ==
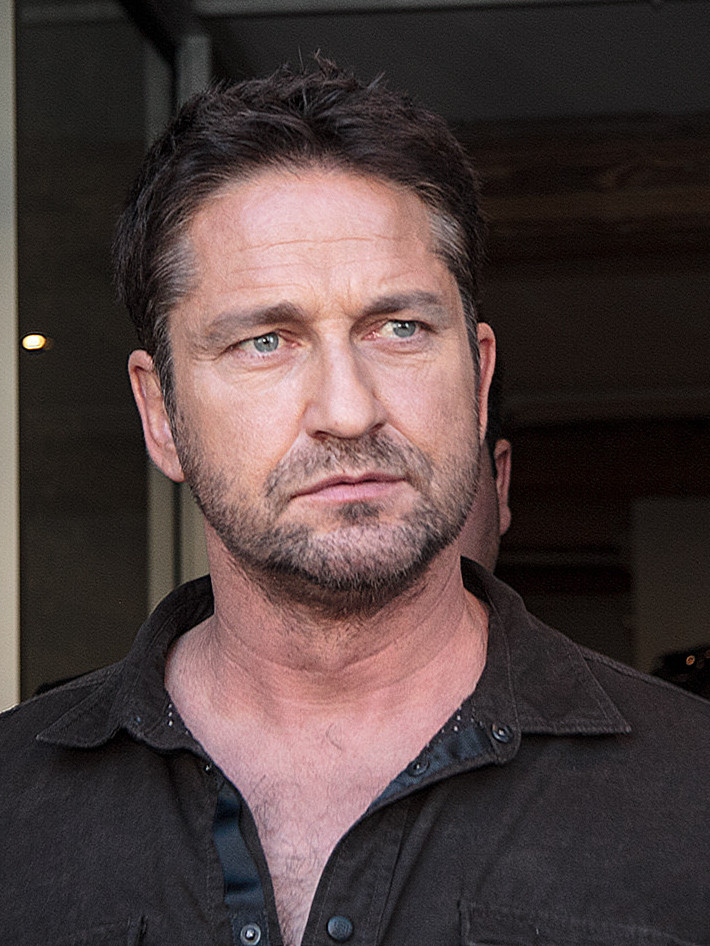
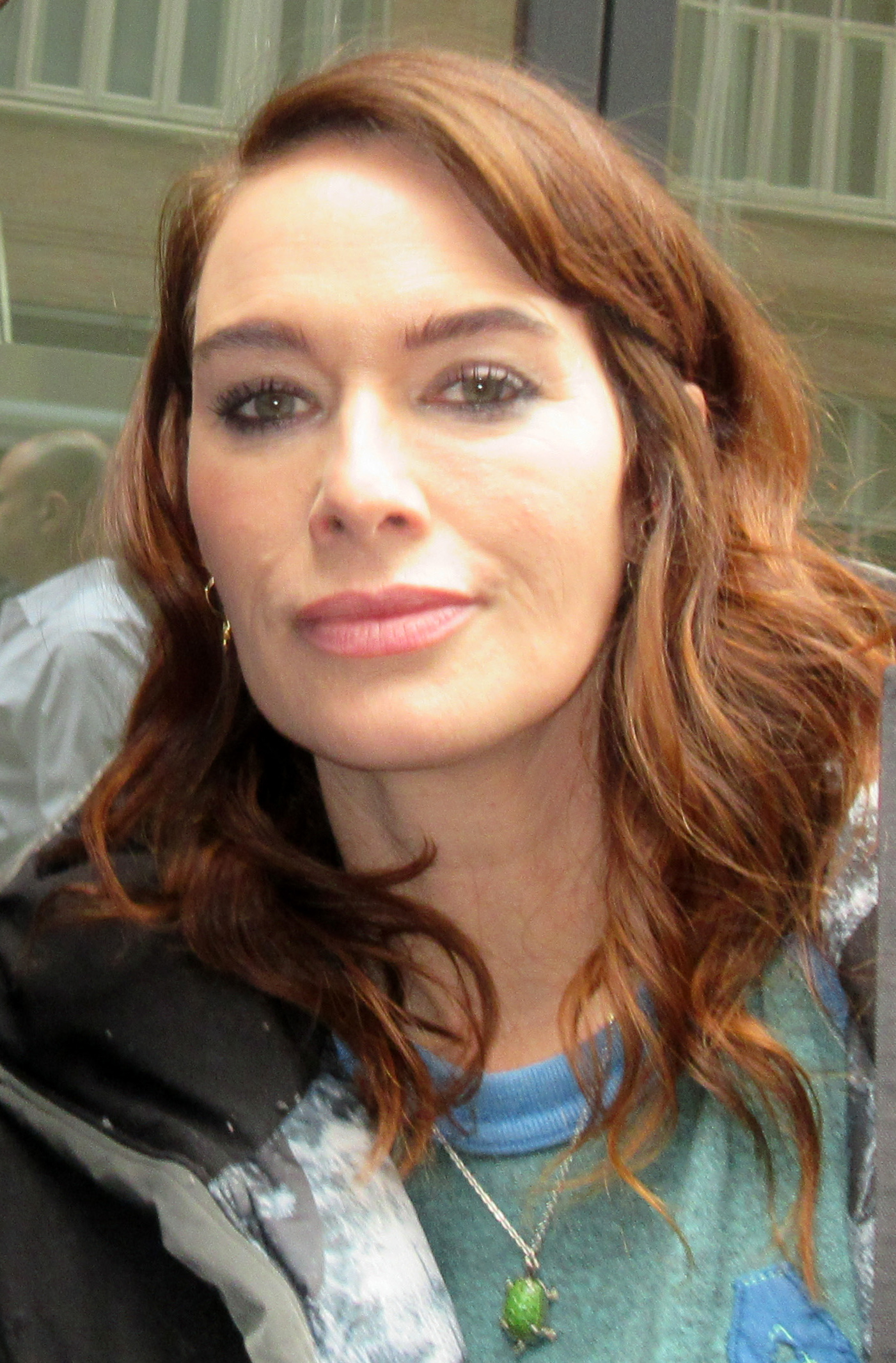
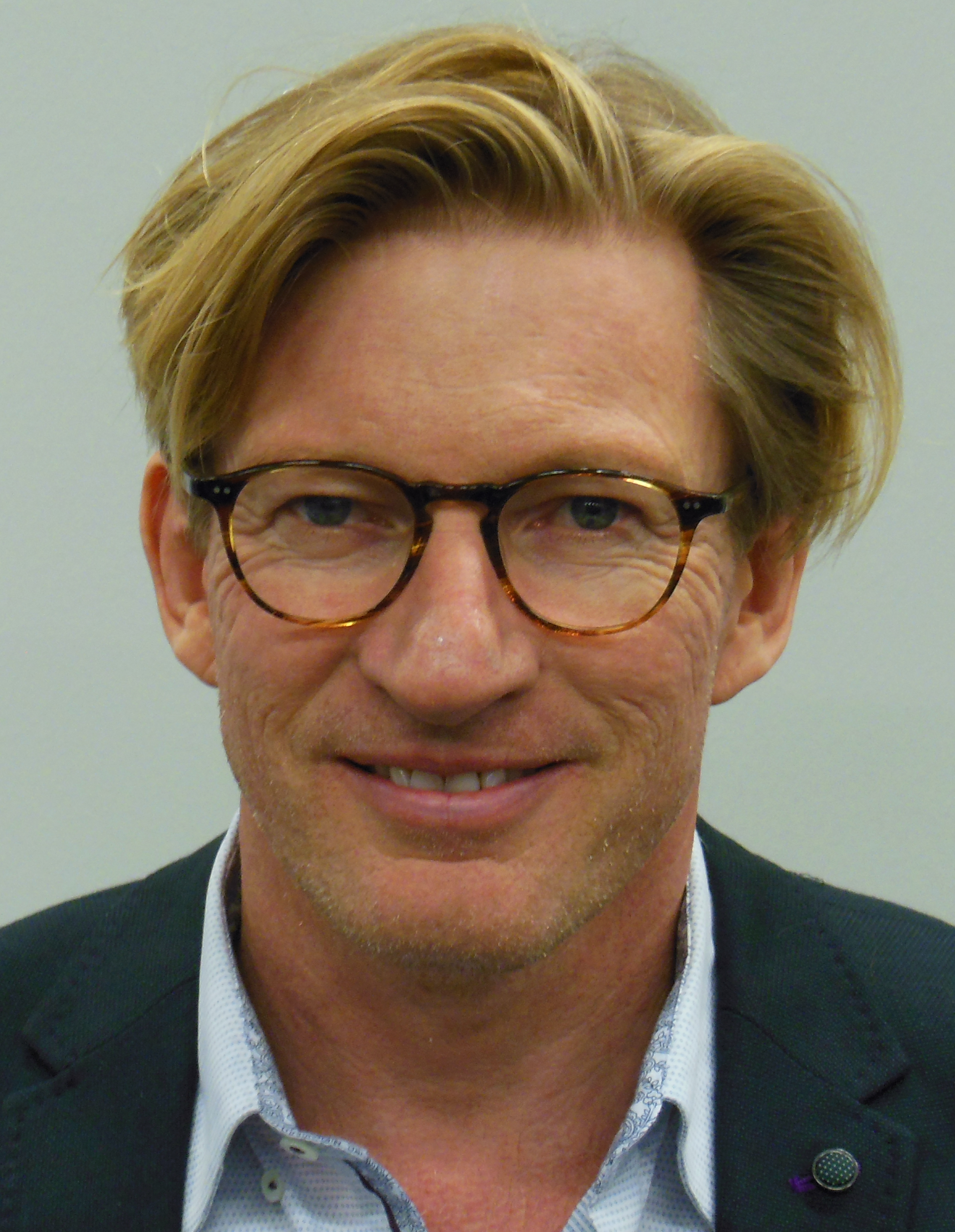
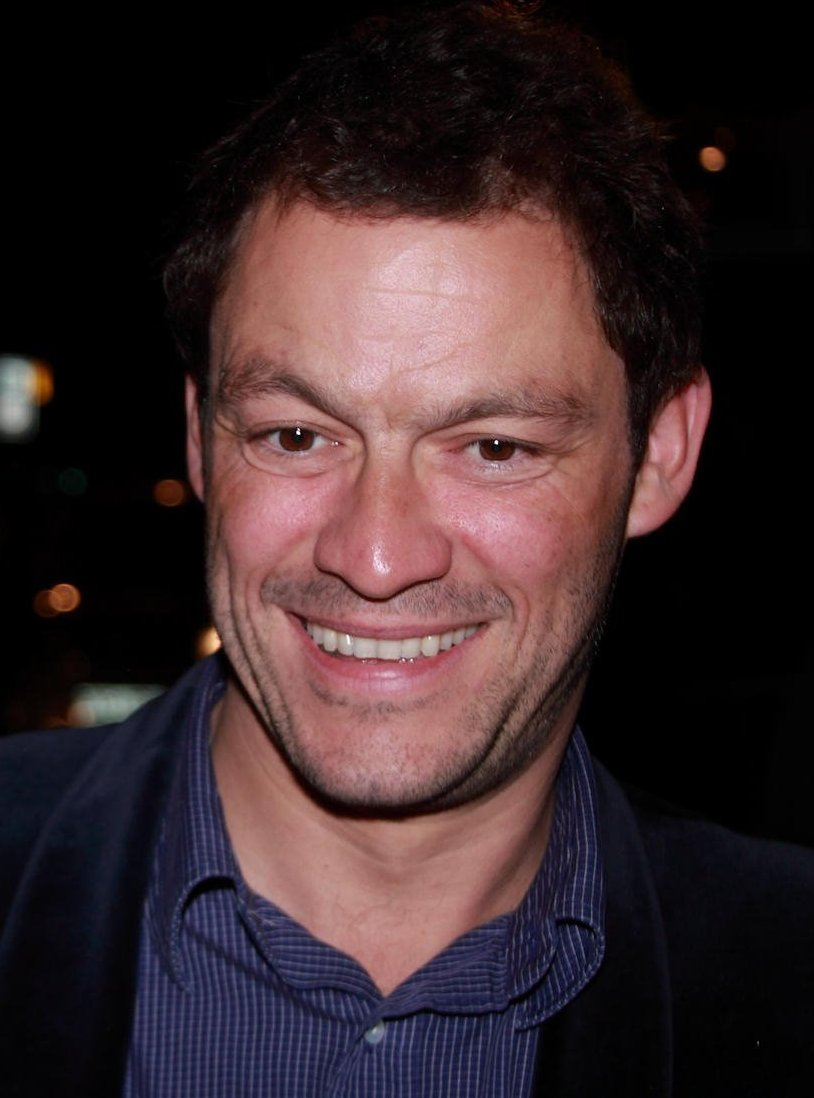
The film stars Gerard Butler, Lena Headey, David Wenham, and Dominic West.
- Gerard Butler as Leonidas, King of Sparta
  - Eli Snyder as young Leonidas (7/8 years old)
  - Tyler Neitzel as young Leonidas (15 years old)
- David Wenham as Dilios, narrator and Spartan soldier
- Lena Headey as Queen Gorgo, Queen of Sparta
- Giovanni Cimmino as Pleistarchus, son of Leonidas and Gorgo
- Dominic West as Theron, a corrupt Spartan politician
- Vincent Regan as Captain Artemis, Leonidas' loyal captain and friend
- Tom Wisdom as Astinos, Captain Artemis's eldest son
- Andrew Pleavin as Daxos, an Arcadian leader who joins forces with Leonidas
- Andrew Tiernan as Ephialtes, a deformed Spartan outcast and traitor
- Rodrigo Santoro as King Xerxes, the powerful and ruthless god-like king of Persia
- Stephen McHattie as the Loyalist, a loyal Spartan politician
- Michael Fassbender as Stelios, a young, spirited and highly skilled Spartan soldier
- Peter Mensah as a Persian messenger who gets kicked into the well by Leonidas
- Kelly Craig as Pythia, an Oracle to the Ephors
- Robert Maillet as Über Immortal (giant), a muscular and deranged Immortal who battles Leonidas during the Immortal fight
- Patrick Sabongui as the Persian General who tries to convince Leonidas to comply at the end of the battle
- Leon Laderach as Executioner, a hulking, clawed man who executes Xerxes's own men
- Tyrone Benskin as the whip-wielding Persian Emissary

== Production ==
=== Development ===
Above: the film version compared to the 1998 comic (below)

Producer Gianni Nunnari was not the only person planning a film about the Battle of Thermopylae, as director Michael Mann had already planned a film of the battle based on the book Gates of Fire. Nunnari discovered Frank Miller's graphic novel 300, which impressed him enough to acquire the film rights. 300 was jointly produced by Nunnari and Mark Canton while Michael B. Gordon wrote the script. Director Zack Snyder was hired in June 2004 as he had attempted to make a film based on Miller's novel before making his debut with the remake of Dawn of the Dead. Snyder then had screenwriter Kurt Johnstad rewrite Gordon's script for production and Frank Miller was retained as consultant and executive producer. Frank Miller's original graphic novel 300 was inspired by the film The 300 Spartans, which Miller first saw at age six.

The film is a shot-for-shot adaptation of the comic book, similar to the 2005 film adaptation of Sin City. Snyder photocopied panels from the comic book, from which he planned the preceding and succeeding shots. "It was a fun process for me... to have a frame as a goal to get to", he said. Like the comic book, the adaptation also used the character Dilios as a narrator. Snyder used this narrative technique to show the audience that the surreal "Frank Miller world" of 300 was told from a subjective perspective. By using Dilios' gift of storytelling, he was able to introduce fantasy elements into the film, explaining that "Dilios is a guy who knows how not to wreck a good story with truth". Snyder also added the subplot in which Queen Gorgo attempts to rally support for Leonidas.

Above: A scene during filming Below: The finished scene

Two months of pre-production were required to create hundreds of shields, spears and swords, some of which were recycled from Troy and Alexander. Creatures were designed by Jordu Schell, and an animatronic wolf and thirteen animatronic horses were created. The actors trained alongside the stuntmen, and even Snyder joined in. Upwards of 600 costumes were created for the film, as well as extensive prosthetics for various characters and the corpses of Persian soldiers. Shaun Smith and Mark Rappaport worked hand in hand with Snyder in pre-production to design the look of the individual characters, and to produce the prosthetic makeup effects, props, weapons and dummy bodies required for the production.

=== Filming ===
300 entered active production on October 17, 2005, in Montreal, and was shot over the course of sixty days in chronological order with a budget of $60 million. Employing the digital backlot technique, Snyder shot at the now-defunct Icestorm Studios in Montreal using bluescreens. Gerard Butler said that while he did not feel constrained by Snyder's direction, fidelity to the comic imposed certain limitations on his performance. David Wenham said there were times when Snyder wanted to precisely capture iconic moments from the comic book, and other times when he gave actors freedom "to explore within the world and the confines that had been set". Lena Headey said of her experience with the bluescreens, "It's very odd, and emotionally, there's nothing to connect to apart from another actor." Only one scene, in which horses travel across the countryside, was shot outdoors. The film was an intensely physical production, and Butler pulled an arm tendon and developed foot drop.

=== Post-production ===
Post-production was handled by Montreal's Meteor Studios and Hybride Technologies filled in the bluescreen footage with more than 1,500 visual effects shots. Visual effects supervisor Chris Watts and production designer Jim Bissell created a process dubbed "The Crush", which allowed the Meteor artists to manipulate the colors by increasing the contrast of light and dark. Certain sequences were desaturated and tinted to establish different moods. Ghislain St-Pierre, who led the team of artists, described the effect: "Everything looks realistic, but it has a kind of a gritty illustrative feel." Various computer programs, including Maya, RenderMan, and RealFlow, were used to create the "spraying blood". The post-production lasted for a year and was handled by a total of ten special effects companies.

== Music ==
In July 2005, composer Tyler Bates began work on the film, describing the score as having "beautiful themes on the top and large choir", but "tempered with some extreme heaviness". The composer had scored for a test scene that the director wanted to show to Warner Bros. to illustrate the path of the project. Bates said that the score had "a lot of weight and intensity in the low end of the percussion" that Snyder found agreeable to the film. The score was recorded at Abbey Road Studios and features the vocals of Azam Ali. A standard edition and a special edition of the soundtrack containing 25 tracks was released on March 6, 2007, with the special edition containing a 16-page booklet and three two-sided trading cards.

The score has caused some controversy in the film composer community, garnering criticism for its striking similarity to several other recent soundtracks, including James Horner and Gabriel Yared's work for the film Troy. The heaviest borrowings are said to be from Elliot Goldenthal's 1999 score for Titus. "Remember Us", from 300, is identical in parts to the "Finale" from Titus, and "Returns a King" is similar to the cue "Victorius Titus". On August 3, 2007, Warner Bros. Pictures acknowledged in an official statement:

... a number of the music cues for the score of 300 were, without our knowledge or participation, derived from music composed by Academy Award-winning composer Elliot Goldenthal for the motion picture Titus. Warner Bros. Pictures has great respect for Elliot, our longtime collaborator, and is pleased to have amicably resolved this matter.

== Marketing ==
The official 300 website was launched by Warner Bros. in December 2005. The "conceptual art" and Zack Snyder's production blog were the initial attractions of the site. Later, the website added video journals describing production details, including comic-to-screen shots and the creatures of 300. In January 2007, the studio launched a MySpace page for the film. The Art Institutes created a micro-site to promote the film.

At San Diego Comic-Con in July 2006, the 300 panel aired a promotional teaser trailer of the film, which was positively received. Despite stringent security, the trailer was subsequently leaked on the Internet. Warner Bros. released the official trailer for 300 on October 4, 2006, and later on it made its debut on Apple.com where it received considerable exposure. The background music used in the trailers was "Just Like You Imagined" by Nine Inch Nails. A second 300 trailer, which was attached to Apocalypto, was released in theaters on December 8, 2006, and online the day before. On January 22, 2007, an exclusive trailer for the film was broadcast during prime-time television. The trailers have been credited with igniting interest in the film and contributing to its box-office success.

In April 2006, Warner Bros. Interactive Entertainment announced its intention to make a PlayStation Portable game, 300: March to Glory, based on the film. Collision Studios worked with Warner Bros. to capture the style of the film in the video game, which was released simultaneously with the film in the United States. The National Entertainment Collectibles Association produced a series of action figures based on the film, as well as replicas of weapons and armor.

Warner Bros. promoted 300 by sponsoring the Ultimate Fighting Championship's light heavyweight champion Chuck Liddell, who made personal appearances and participated in other promotional activities. The studio also joined with the National Hockey League to produce a 30-second TV spot promoting the film in tandem with the Stanley Cup playoffs.

== Release ==
=== Theatrical ===
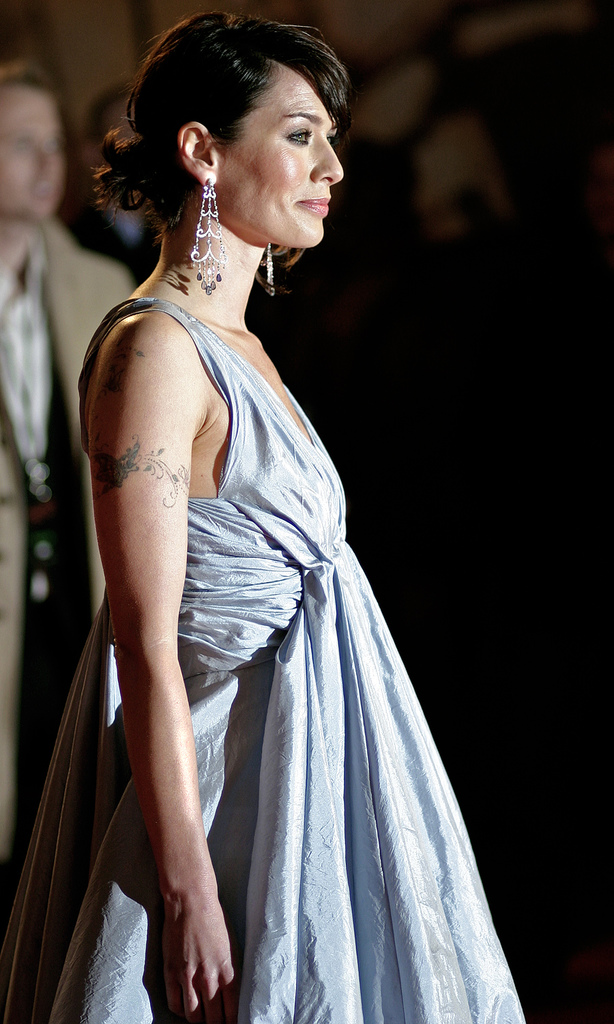
Lena Headey at the London premiere, 2007

In August 2006, Warner Bros. announced 300's release date as March 16, 2007, but in October the release was moved forward to March 9, 2007. An unfinished cut of 300 was shown at Butt-Numb-A-Thon film festival on December 9, 2006.

=== Home media ===
300 was released on DVD, Blu-ray Disc, and HD DVD on July 31, 2007, in region 1 territories, in both single-disc and two-disc editions. 300 was released in single-disc and steelcase two-disc editions on DVD, BD and HD DVD in region 2 territories beginning August 2007. On July 21, 2009, Warner Bros. released a new Blu-ray Disc entitled 300: The Complete Experience to coincide with the Blu-ray Disc release of Watchmen. This new Blu-ray Disc is encased in a 40-page Digibook and includes all the extras from the original release as well as some new ones. These features include a picture-in-picture feature entitled The Complete 300: A Comprehensive Immersion, which enables the viewer to view the film in three different perspectives. This release also includes a digital copy. An Ultra HD Blu-ray edition of the film was released on October 6, 2020.

On July 9, 2007, American cable channel TNT bought the rights to broadcast the film from Warner Bros. TNT started airing the film in September 2009. Sources say that the network paid between $17 million and just under $20 million for the broadcasting rights. TNT agreed to a three-year deal instead of the more typical five-year deal.

== Reception ==
=== Box office ===
300 was released in North America on March 9, 2007, in both conventional and IMAX theaters. It grossed $28,106,731 on its opening day and ended its North American opening weekend with $70,885,301, breaking the record held by Ice Age: The Meltdown for the biggest opening weekend in the month of March and for a spring release. Since then 300's spring release record was broken by Fast and Furious and 300's March record was broken by Tim Burton's Alice in Wonderland. 300's opening weekend gross is the 24th-highest in box office history, coming slightly below The Lost World: Jurassic Park but higher than Transformers. It was the third-biggest opening for an R-rated film ever, behind The Matrix Reloaded ($91.8 million) and The Passion of the Christ ($83.8 million). The film also set a record for IMAX cinemas with a $3.6 million opening weekend. The film grossed $468,879,361 worldwide.

300 opened two days earlier, on March 7, 2007, in Sparta, and across Greece on March 8. Studio executives were surprised by the showing, which was twice what they had expected. They credited the film's stylized violence, the strong female role of Queen Gorgo which attracted a large number of women, and a MySpace advertising blitz. Producer Mark Canton said, "MySpace had an enormous impact but it has transcended the limitations of the Internet or the graphic novel. Once you make a great movie, word can spread very quickly."

=== Critical response ===
The film received a standing ovation at its world premiere in front of 1,700 audience members at the Berlin International Film Festival on February 14, 2007. It had been panned at a press screening hours earlier, where many attendees left during the showing and those who remained booed at the end.

As of July 2024, on Rotten Tomatoes, the film had an approval rating of 61% based on 238 reviews, with an average rating of 6.10/10. The site's critical consensus reads, "A simple-minded but visually exciting experience, full of blood, violence, and ready-made movie quotes." As of October 2020, on Metacritic, the film had a weighted average score of 52 out of 100, based on 42 critics, indicating "mixed or average" reviews. Audiences polled by CinemaScore gave the film an average grade of "A−" on an A+ to F scale.

Some of the most unfavorable reviews came from major American newspapers. A. O. Scott of The New York Times described 300 as "about as violent as Apocalypto and twice as stupid", and he also criticized its color scheme and suggested that its plot includes racist undertones; Scott also poked fun at the buffed bodies of the actors who portrayed the Spartans, declaring that the Persian characters are "pioneers in the art of face-piercing", and declaring that the actors who played the Spartans had access to "superior health clubs and electrolysis facilities". Kenneth Turan wrote in the Los Angeles Times that "unless you love violence as much as a Spartan, Quentin Tarantino or a video-game-playing teenage boy, you will not be endlessly fascinated". Roger Ebert gave the film a 2 out of 4 rating, writing that "300 has one-dimensional caricatures who talk like professional wrestlers plugging their next feud". Some critics employed at Greek newspapers have been particularly critical, such as film critic Robby Eksiel, who said that moviegoers would be dazzled by the "digital action" but also feel irritated by the "pompous interpretations and one-dimensional characters".

Variety's Todd McCarthy described the film as "visually arresting" although "bombastic" while Kirk Honeycutt, writing in The Hollywood Reporter, praised the "beauty of its topography, colors and forms". Writing in the Chicago Sun-Times, Richard Roeper acclaimed 300 as "the Citizen Kane of cinematic graphic novels". Empire gave the film three out of five, writing, "Visually stunning, thoroughly belligerent and as shallow as a pygmy's paddling pool, this is a whole heap of style tinged with just a smidgen of substance." Comic Book Resources' Mark Cronan found the film compelling, leaving him "with a feeling of power, from having been witness to something grand". IGN's Todd Gilchrist acclaimed Zack Snyder as a cinematic visionary and "a possible redeemer of modern moviemaking".

=== Accolades ===
At the 2007 MTV Movie Awards, 300 was nominated for Best Movie, Best Performance for Gerard Butler, Best Breakthrough Performance for Lena Headey, Best Villain for Rodrigo Santoro, and Best Fight for Leonidas battling "the Über Immortal", but only won the award for Best Fight. 300 won both the Best Dramatic Film and Best Action Film honors in the 2006–2007 Golden Icon Awards presented by Travolta Family Entertainment. In December 2007, 300 won IGN's Movie of the Year 2007, along with Best Comic Book Adaptation and King Leonidas as Favorite Character. The movie received 10 nominations for the 2008 Saturn Awards, winning the awards for Best Director and Best Action/Adventure/Thriller Film. In 2009, National Review magazine ranked 300 number five on its 25 "Best Conservative Movies of the Last 25 Years" list.

=== Historical accuracy ===
In the actual Battle of Thermopylae, the Spartans had already joined an alliance with other Greek poleis against the Persians. During the Battle of Thermopylae, Xerxes's invasion of Greece coincided with a Spartan religious festival, the Carneia, in which the Spartans were not permitted to make war. Still, realizing the threat of the Persians and not wanting to appear as Persian sympathizers, the Spartan government, rather than Leonidas alone, decided to send Leonidas with his personal 300-strong bodyguard to Thermopylae. Other Greek poleis joined the 300 Spartan men and totaled somewhere between 5,000 and 6,000 total Greek troops. The historical consensus among both ancient chroniclers and current scholars was that Thermopylae was a clear Greek defeat, and the Persian invasion would be pushed back only in later ground and naval battles.

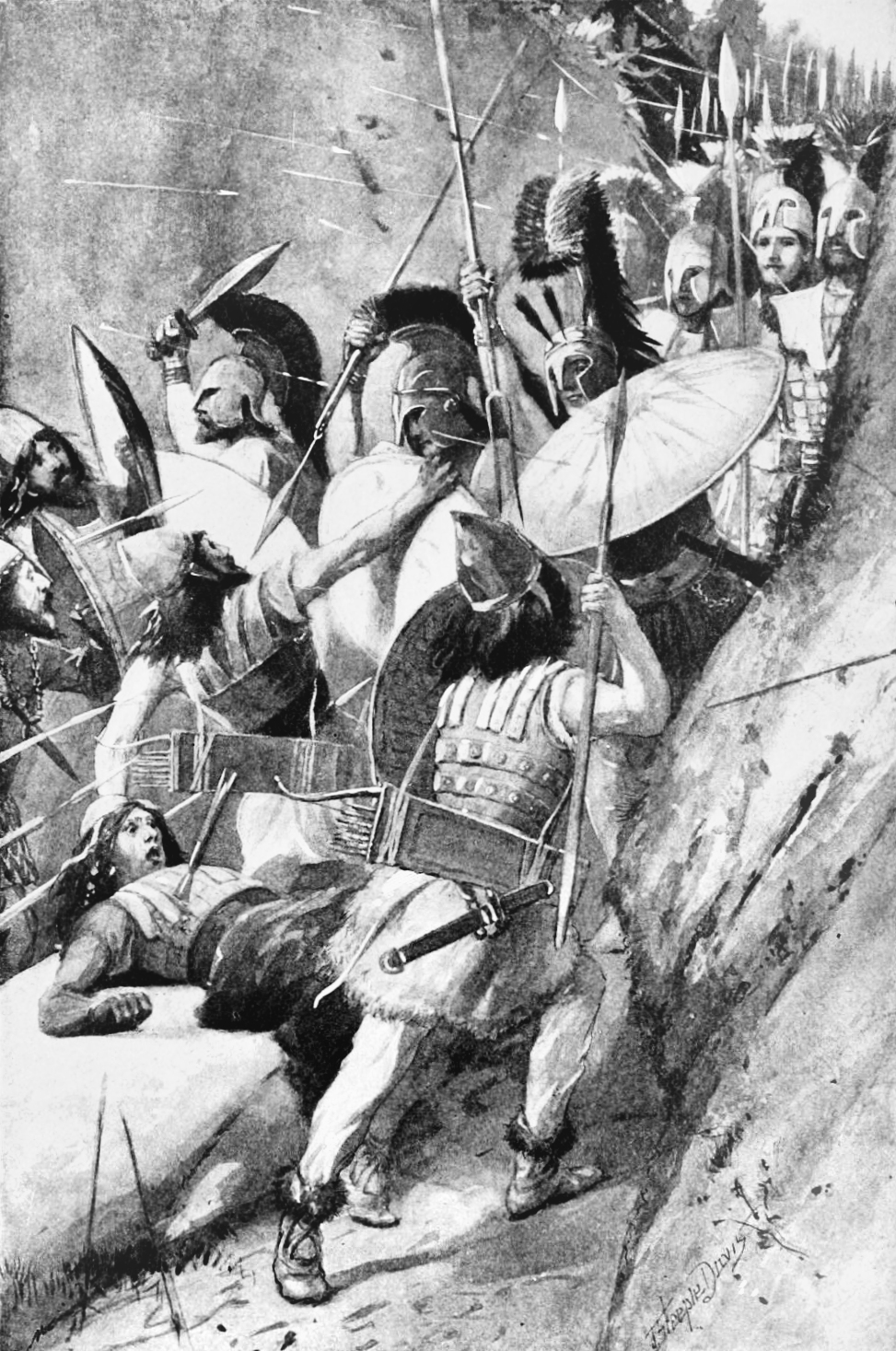
The films depicts the battle of Thermopylae as the 300 Spartans fighting the Persian army.

Since few records on the actual martial arts used by the Spartans survive aside from accounts of formations and tactics, the fight choreography, led by the stunt coordinator and fight choreographer Damon Caro, was a synthesis of different weapon arts with Filipino martial arts as the base.

Paul Cartledge, Professor of Greek History at Cambridge University, advised the filmmakers on the pronunciation of Greek names and said that they "made good use" of his published work on Sparta. He praised the film for its portrayal of "the Spartans' heroic code" and of "the key role played by women in backing up, indeed reinforcing, the male martial code of heroic honour", but he expressed reservations about its "'West' (goodies) vs 'East' (baddies) polarization". Cartledge wrote that he enjoyed the film but found Leonidas' description of the Athenians as "boy lovers" ironic since the Spartans themselves incorporated institutional pederasty into their educational system.

Ephraim Lytle, assistant professor of Hellenistic history at the University of Toronto, said that 300 selectively idealized Spartan society in a "problematic and disturbing" fashion and portrayed the "hundred nations of the Persians" as monsters and non-Spartan Greeks as weak. He suggested that the film's moral universe would have seemed "as bizarre to ancient Greeks as it does to modern historians". Lytle also commented, "Ephialtes, who betrays the Greeks, is likewise changed from a local Malian of sound body into a Spartan outcast, a grotesquely disfigured troll who by Spartan custom should have been left exposed as an infant to die. Leonidas points out that his hunched back means Ephialtes cannot lift his shield high enough to fight in the phalanx. This is a transparent defense of Spartan eugenics, and convenient given that infanticide could as easily have been precipitated by an ill-omened birthmark."

Victor Davis Hanson, a National Review columnist and former professor of classical history at California State University, Fresno, wrote the foreword to a 2007 reissue of the graphic novel and said that the film demonstrates a specific affinity with the original material of Herodotus in that it captures the martial ethos of ancient Sparta and represents Thermopylae as a "clash of civilizations". He remarked that Simonides, Aeschylus, and Herodotus viewed Thermopylae as a battle against "Eastern centralism and collective serfdom", which opposed "the idea of the free citizen of an autonomous polis". He also said that the film portrays the battle in a "surreal" manner and that the intent was to "entertain and shock first, and instruct second".

Touraj Daryaee, who is now Baskerville Professor of Iranian History and the Persian World at the University of California, Irvine, criticized the film's use of classical sources by writing:

Some passages from the Classical authors Aeschylus, Diodorus, Herodotus and Plutarch are spilt over the movie to give it an authentic flavor. Aeschylus becomes a major source when the battle with the "monstrous human herd" of the Persians is narrated in the film. Diodorus' statement about Greek valor to preserve their liberty is inserted in the film, but his mention of Persian valor is omitted. Herodotus' fanciful numbers are used to populate the Persian army, and Plutarch's discussion of Greek women, specifically Spartan women, is inserted wrongly in the dialogue between the "misogynist" Persian ambassador and the Spartan king. Classical sources are certainly used, but exactly in all the wrong places, or quite naively. The Athenians were fighting a sea battle during this.

Robert McHenry, the former editor-in-chief of Encyclopædia Britannica and the author of How to Know, said that the film "is an almost ineffably silly movie. Stills from the film could easily be used to promote Buns of Steel, or AbMaster, or ThighMaster. It's about the romanticizing of the Spartan 'ideal', a process that began even in ancient times, was promoted by the Romans, and has survived over time while less and less resembling the actual historical Sparta."

Snyder stated in an MTV interview that "the events are 90 percent accurate. It's just in the visualization that it's crazy.... I've shown this movie to world-class historians who have said it's amazing. They can't believe it's as accurate as it is." Nevertheless, he also said the film is "an opera, not a documentary. That's what I say when people say it's historically inaccurate." He was also quoted in a BBC News story as saying that the film is, at its core "a fantasy film". He also describes the film's narrator, Dilios, as "a guy who knows how not to wreck a good story with truth".

In an interview, Miller stated, "The inaccuracies, almost all of them, are intentional. I took those chest plates and leather skirts off of them for a reason. I wanted these guys to move and I wanted 'em to look good. I knocked their helmets off a fair amount, partly so you can recognize who the characters are. Spartans, in full regalia, were almost indistinguishable except at a very close angle. Another liberty I took was, they all had plumes, but I only gave a plume to Leonidas, to make him stand out and identify him as a king. I was looking for more an evocation than a history lesson. The best result I can hope for is that if the movie excites someone, they'll go explore the histories themselves. Because the histories are endlessly fascinating."

Kaveh Farrokh, in the paper "The 300 Movie: Separating Fact from Fiction", noted that the film falsely portrayed "the Greco-Persian Wars in binary terms: the democratic, good, rational 'Us' versus the tyrannical, evil and irrational, 'other' of the ever-nebulous (if not exotic) 'Persia'". He highlighted three points regarding the contribution of the Achaemenid Empire to the creation of democracy and human rights: "The founder of the Achaemenid Empire, Cyrus the Great, was the world's first emperor to openly declare and guarantee the sanctity of human rights and individual freedom.... Cyrus was a follower of the teachings of Zoroaster, the founder of one of the world's oldest monotheistic religions.... When Cyrus defeated King Nabonidus of Babylon, he officially declared the freedom of the Jews from their Babylonian captivity. This was the first time in history that a world power had guaranteed the survival of the Jewish people, religion, customs and culture." He abolished slavery.

=== General criticism ===
Before the release of 300, Warner Bros. expressed concerns about the political aspects of the film's theme. Snyder relates that there was "a huge sensitivity about East versus West with the studio". Media speculation about a possible parallel between the Greco-Persian conflict and current events began in an interview with Snyder that was conducted before the Berlin Film Festival. The interviewer remarked that "everyone is sure to be translating this [film] into contemporary politics". Snyder replied that he was aware that people would read the film through the lens of current events, but no parallels the film and the modern world were intended.

Outside current political parallels, some critics have raised more general questions about the film's ideological orientation. Slate's Dana Stevens compared the film to The Eternal Jew (1940) "as a textbook example of how race-baiting fantasy and nationalist myth can serve as an incitement to total war. Since it's a product of the post-ideological, post-Xbox 21st century, 300 will instead be talked about as a technical achievement, the next blip on the increasingly blurry line between movies and video games." Roger Moore, a critic for the Orlando Sentinel, relates 300 to Susan Sontag's definition of "fascist art". Indeed, the Lambda sign on the Spartans' shields in 300 formed the inspiration for the official symbol of the far-right Identitarian movement.

Newsday critic Gene Seymour, on the other hand, stated that such reactions are misguided, writing that "the movie's just too darned silly to withstand any ideological theorizing". Snyder himself dismissed ideological readings, suggesting that reviewers who critique "a graphic novel movie about a bunch of guys... stomping the snot out of each other" using words like "'neocon', 'homophobic', 'homoerotic' or 'racist'" are "missing the point". Snyder, however, also admitted to fashioning an effeminate villain specifically to make young straight males in the audience uncomfortable: "What's more scary to a 20-year-old boy than a giant god-king who wants to have his way with you?" The Slovenian critic Slavoj Žižek pointed out that the story represents "a poor, small country (Greece) invaded by the army of a much large[r] state (Persia)" and suggested the identification of the Spartans with a modern superpower to be flawed.

The writer Frank Miller said: "The Spartans were a paradoxical people. They were the biggest slave owners in Greece. But at the same time, Spartan women had an unusual level of rights. It's a paradox that they were a bunch of people who in many ways were fascist, but they were the bulwark against the fall of democracy. The closest comparison you can draw in terms of our own military today is to think of the red-caped Spartans as being like our special-ops forces. They're these almost superhuman characters with a tremendous warrior ethic, who were unquestionably the best fighters in Greece. I didn't want to render Sparta in overly accurate terms, because ultimately I do want you to root for the Spartans. I couldn't show them being quite as cruel as they were. I made them as cruel as I thought a modern audience could stand."

Michael M. Chemers, author of "'With Your Shield, or on It': Disability Representation in 300" in the Disability Studies Quarterly, said that the film's portrayal of the hunchback and his story "is not mere ableism: this is anti-disability". Frank Miller, commenting on areas in which he lessened the Spartan cruelty for narrative purposes, said: "I have King Leonidas very gently tell Ephialtes, the hunchback, that they can't use him [as a soldier], because of his deformity. It would be much more classically Spartan if Leonidas laughed and kicked him off the cliff."

=== Iranian criticism ===
The portrayal of King Xerxes (right) was a subject of criticism. Snyder said of Xerxes, "What's more scary to a 20-year-old boy than a giant god-king who wants to have his way with you?"

From its opening, 300 also attracted controversy over its portrayal of Persians. Officials of the Iranian government denounced the film. Some scenes in the film portray demon-like and other fictional creatures as part of the Persian army, and the fictionalized portrayal of Persian King Xerxes I has been criticised as effeminate. Critics suggested that it was meant to stand in stark contrast to the portrayed masculinity of the Spartan army. Steven Rea argued that the film's Persians were a vehicle for an anachronistic cross-section of Western aspirational stereotypes of Asian and African cultures.

The film's portrayal of ancient Persians caused a particularly strong reaction in Iran. Various Iranian officials condemned the film. The Iranian Academy of the Arts submitted a formal complaint against the film to UNESCO that called it an attack on the historical identity of Iran. The Iranian mission to the United Nations protested the film in a press release, and Iranian embassies protested its screening in France, Thailand, Turkey, and Uzbekistan. The film was banned in Iran, with it being considered American propaganda.

Reviewers in the United States and elsewhere "noted the political overtones of the West-against-Iran story line and the way Persians are depicted as decadent, sexually flamboyant and evil in contrast to the noble Greeks". With black market copies of the film already available in Tehran with the film's international release and news of the film's surprising success at the US box office, the film prompted widespread anger in Iran. Azadeh Moaveni of Time reported, "All of Tehran was outraged. Everywhere I went yesterday, the talk vibrated with indignation over the film." Newspapers in Iran featured headlines such as "Hollywood Declares War on Iranians" and "300 Against 70 Million", the latter being the size of Iran's population. Ayende-No, an independent Iranian newspaper, said, "The film depicts Iranians as demons, without culture, feeling or humanity, who think of nothing except attacking other nations and killing people." Four Members of Majles (the Iranian parliament) called on other Muslim countries to ban the film, and a group of Iranian film makers submitted a letter of protest to UNESCO regarding the film's misrepresentation of Iranian history and culture. The cultural advisor to Iranian President Mahmoud Ahmadinejad called the film an "American attempt for psychological warfare against Iran".

Moaveni identified two factors that may have contributed to the intensity of Iranian indignation over the film. Firstly, she described the timing of the film's release, on the eve of Nowruz, the Persian New Year, as "inauspicious". Secondly, Iranians tend to view the era depicted in the film as "a particularly noble page in their history". Moaveni suggested that 300's box office success compared with Alexander's failure (another spurious period epic dealing with Persians), was "cause for considerable alarm, signaling ominous U.S. intentions".

According to The Guardian, Iranian critics of 300, ranging from bloggers to government officials, described the movie "as a calculated attempt to demonise Iran at a time of intensifying U.S. pressure over the country's nuclear programme". An Iranian government spokesman described the film as "hostile behavior which is the result of cultural and psychological warfare". Moaveni reported that the Iranians with whom she interacted were "adamant that the movie was secretly funded by the U.S. government to prepare Americans for going to war against Iran".

== In popular culture ==
An example of the "This is Sparta" meme spawned from one of the movie's scenes.

300 has been spoofed in film, television, and other media, with the scene of Leonidas kicking the Persian herald into a pit in particular spawning the "This is Sparta!" internet meme during the late 2000s. Skits based upon the film have appeared on Saturday Night Live and Robot Chicken, the latter of which mimicked the visual style of 300 in a parody set during the American Revolutionary War, titled "1776". Other parodies include an episode of South Park named "D-Yikes!", the short film United 300 which won the 2007 MTV Movie Spoof Award, and "BOO!" by Mad magazine in its September 2007 issue #481, written by Desmond Devlin and illustrated by Mort Drucker. 20th Century Fox released Meet the Spartans, a spoof directed by Jason Friedberg and Aaron Seltzer. Universal Pictures once planned a similar parody, titled National Lampoon's 301: The Legend of Awesomest Maximus Wallace Leonidas.

300, particularly its pithy quotations, has been "adopted" by the student body of Michigan State University (whose nickname is the Spartans), with chants of "Spartans, what is your profession?" becoming common at sporting events starting after the film's release, and Michigan State basketball head coach Tom Izzo dressed as Leonidas at one student event. Nate Ebner, a football player with the New England Patriots in the National Football League and formerly with the Ohio State Buckeyes, was nicknamed "Leonidas," because of his intense workout regimen, and his beard.

== Sequel ==
In June 2008, producers Mark Canton, Gianni Nunnari and Bernie Goldmann revealed that work had begun on a sequel to 300, 300: Rise of an Empire. Legendary Pictures had announced that Frank Miller had started writing the follow-up graphic novel and that Zack Snyder was interested in directing the adaptation but moved on to develop and direct the Superman reboot and DC Extended Universe first installment Man of Steel. Noam Murro directed instead, while Zack Snyder produced. The film focused on the Athenian admiral, Themistocles, as portrayed by Australian actor Sullivan Stapleton. The sequel, 300: Rise of an Empire, was released on March 7, 2014, and achieved box office success with $337 million grossed worldwide from a budget of $110 million, despite receiving mixed reviews.

== See also ==
- List of historical films set in Near Eastern and Western civilization
- Laconophilia
