= Ayande-ye No =

Ayande-No (Persian: آینده نو; The New Future in English) is an independent Persian-language newspaper published in Iran.

== History and profile ==
Ayande-ye No was established in August 2006. The paper has a reformist stance. In February 2007, the newspaper launched its online edition.

In reaction to the 2007 film 300, an adaptation of Frank Miller's 1998 graphic novel, was widely criticized for its portrayal of Persian combatants at the Battle of Thermopylae. Ayende-No, in a front page said that "the film depicts Iranians as demons, without culture, feeling or humanity, who think of nothing except attacking other nations and killing people".
