= Goemon (film) =

- Original Japanese release poster
- Directed by: Kazuaki Kiriya
- Written by: Kazuaki Kiriya; Tetsurô Takita
- Produced by: Kazuaki Kiriya; Takashige Ichise
- Starring: Yōsuke Eguchi; Takao Osawa; Ryōko Hirosue
- Cinematography: Kazuaki Kiriya
- Edited by: Kazuaki Kiriya; Chisako Yokoyama
- Music by: Akihiko Matsumoto
- Production companies: Daiichi Shokai Co. Ltd; Dentsu; Dream Kid; Eisei Gekijo; Goemon Partners; Hot Toys Limited; Kinoshita Management, K.K.; Kiriya Pictures; Oz Company; Shochiku; TV Asahi; Warner Bros. Pictures; Yoshimoto Kogyo Company
- Distributed by: Warner Bros. Pictures
- Release date: May 1, 2009 (Japan)
- Running time: 128 minutes
- Country: Japan
- Language: Japanese
- Budget: $9 million
- Box office: $14.4 million

Goemon (Japanese: 五右衛門) is a 2009 Japanese action film written and directed by Kazuaki Kiriya. It is loosely based on the story of Ishikawa Goemon, a legendary outlaw hero who stole valuables from the rich and gave them to the poor. The film is a fictional account of Goemon's exploits and his role during the final phase of Sengoku period, particularly the period leading up to the decisive Battle of Sekigahara. Like Kiriya's previous film, Casshern, Goemon was filmed on a digital backlot, and made use of over 2,500 visual effects.

Goemon was released in North America on DVD and Blu-ray Disc by Funimation on April 19, 2011, and features an English dubbed audio track.

== Plot ==
In the middle of the bloody Sengoku period, a young Ishikawa Goemon watched his entire family assassinated for political reasons. While escaping with his caretaker, they were attacked by bandits until Goemon was saved by the warlord Oda Nobunaga. Goemon followed Nobunaga to his castle where the impressed warlord took him under his wing and the ninja Hattori Hanzō was assigned to train him alongside Kirigakure Saizō. Goemon was eventually assigned to protect Nobunaga's niece, Chacha who grew to like him. When Chacha left, she gave Goemon her favorite fan as a memento while Nobunaga gave him his double-bladed sword as reward for protecting his niece. Nobunaga was soon murdered by his generals Toyotomi Hideyoshi and Akechi Mitsuhide. After that, Hideyoshi betrayed and killed Mitsuhide to seemingly avenge Nobunaga, and then he became the new ruler of Japan. Goemon and Saizo parted ways; Saizo chose to remain in service to the Oda clan in hopes of rising to samurai status while Goemon chose to leave and be free. As a parting gift, Goemon divided his double-bladed sword in two and gave one half to Saizo.

Years later, Goemon becomes an outlaw with Sarutobi Sasuke, an inexperienced bounty hunter who tried in vain to capture him, as his personal attendant. During a festival, Goemon robs a treasure repository that houses a mysterious box which is referred to as "Pandora's Box" by foreigners. Ishida Mitsunari, a high ranking samurai serving under Hideyoshi, arrives to destroy the box but Goemon escapes with it. Unaware of the value of the box, Goemon throws it away upon finding it empty. It is later picked up a young pick-pocket named Koheita. The following day, Goemon learns of the box's value from Sasuke and returns to the city to find it. While searching in the slums, Goemon finds Koheita and his mother, who has just been murdered by a local samurai. Goemon saves Koheita and retrieves the box.

Saizo, now working under Mitsunari, and his ninja squad appear and confront Goemon over the box. Goemon evades Saizo's team except for Saizo himself and they engage in a fierce duel until Hattori Hanzo intervenes, causing Saizo to withdraw. Returning to the city with the box, Goemon examines it and discovers a map leading to a mysterious treasure. Following the map, Goemon and Sasuke are led to a ruined Buddhist temple where they find a hidden contract containing Hideyoshi and Mitsuhide's signatures. From it, Goemon learns of Hideyoshi's involvement in Nobunaga's death. Hanzo reappears and offers his old student a bag of gold for the contract. Seeking vengeance for his murdered lord, Goemon infiltrates Hideyoshi's palace and kills him. Goemon then reunites with Chacha for a short while before hiding himself. To his shock, Goemon discovers Hideyoshi enter Chacha's room, realizing he just killed his fake double. Later on, one of Hideyoshi's guards discovers Goemon and shoots him. Goemon is soon rescued by Saizo. Not long after, Hanzo takes Goemon to a waterfall to meet with Chacha. Chacha bids Goemon farewell after revealing that she has agreed to become Hideyoshi's concubine. Later, Tokugawa Ieyasu, Hanzo's new liege lord, arrives and asks Goemon to assassinate Hideyoshi in order to save the country.

Meanwhile, Mitsunari offers Saizo samurai status in return for killing Hideyoshi. During Hideyoshi and Chacha's wedding aboard a royal ship, Goemon prepares to kill him but he changes his mind. Moments later, all of Hideyoshi's escort ships are destroyed by explosives set by Saizo and his team, and then they assassinate Hideyoshi. Believing Hideyoshi to be dead, Mitsunari turns on Saizo and shoots him. However, Hideyoshi and Saizo survive. Unaware of Mitsunari's betrayal, Hideyoshi interrogates Saizo, who is soon saved by Goemon. Saizo then races to save his family, only to discover that Mitsunari has kidnapped his infant child and killed his wife. Saizo is recaptured and executed through death by boiling along with his child after he falsely confesses that he is Goemon. With the help of Saizo's team, Goemon storms through the palace until he reaches Hideyoshi, whom he finally kills, and then he rescues Chacha. With Hideyoshi dead, a power struggle between Tokugawa and Mitsunari begins and Goemon, having enough of the conflict, decides to intervene.

Goemon charges into the battle wearing Nobunaga's armor and carrying his fully repaired double-bladed sword. His appearance instills fear on the warring armies as they believe Nobunaga has returned. Goemon fights through the armies until he reaches and kills Mitsunari during a solar eclipse, causing Mitsunari's army to retreat. Goemon then charges through Tokugawa's army, but Hanzo intercepts him mid-way. Goemon immobilizes Hanzo by pinning his foot to the ground with a broken sword blade, allowing him to approach Tokugawa. As Goemon closes in to kill Tokugawa, he is mortally wounded by Sasuke. It is later revealed that he is only holding Chacha's fan; Goemon actually planned to get Tokugawa to promise that there will finally be peace. When Tokugawa agrees, Goemon leaves the battlefield. Goemon struggles to make his way back to Chacha, but he dies of his wounds while watching the fireflies.

== Cast ==
| Character | (Japan) Japanese actor | (United States) English dubbing |
|---|---|---|
| Ishikawa Goemon | Yōsuke Eguchi | Travis Willingham |
| Young Goemon | Tokimasa Tanabe | unknown |
| Kirigakure Saizō | Takao Osawa | Troy Baker |
| Young Saizō | Takeru Satoh | unknown |
| Chacha | Ryōko Hirosue | unknown |
| Young Chacha | Mayuko Fukuda | unknown |
| Sarutobi Sasuke | Gori | Todd Haberkorn |
| Toyotomi Hideyoshi | Eiji Okuda | Christopher Sabat |
| Akechi Mitsuhide | Kazuaki Kiriya | unknown |
| Ishida Mitsunari | Jun Kaname | unknown |
| Tokugawa Ieyasu | Masatō Ibu | Kent Williams |
| Oda Nobunaga | Hashinosuké Nakamura | unknown |
| Hattori Hanzō | Susumu Terajima | unknown |
| Rikyū Sen | Mikijirō Hira | unknown |
| Matahachi | Tetsuji Tamayama | unknown |
| Gao | Choi Hong-man | unknown |
| Yugiri | Erika Toda | unknown |

=== English dubbing staff ===
- Dubbing director:
- Dubbing studio: Funimation
- Media: DVD/Blu-ray Disc

== Reception ==
The film was nominated at the Asian Film Awards in 2010 for the categories of Best Costume Designer (Vaughan Alexander and Tina Kalivas) and Best Visual Effects (Takuya Fujita and Kôji Nozaki).

According to Twitch Film, "Goemon is going to be a divisive film ... It fits in well with their live action catalog of films like Shinobi: Heart Under Blade and yet it feels like a live action anime." According to a DVD Verdict review by Paul Pritchard, Goemon "entertains with its combination of imaginative visuals and exciting action sequences, but leaves you wanting for more". The Blu-ray Disc version was "highly recommended" by Blu-ray.com.

== Soundtrack ==
The soundtrack to Goemon, composed by Akihiko Matsumoto, was released in Japan on April 22, 2009, by Columbia Music Entertainment. The film's theme song, "Rosa -Movie Mix-", composed by Yoshiki and performed by Violet UK, was released on iTunes seven days later on April 29, 2009.
