= Digital backlot =

Type of motion-picture set

A digital backlot or virtual backlot is a motion-picture set that is neither a genuine location nor a constructed studio; the shooting takes place entirely on a stage with a blank background (often a greenscreen) that will later on project an artificial environment put in during post-production. Digital backlots are mainly used for genres such as science fiction, where building a real set would be too expensive or outright impossible.

== Notable films ==
Among the first films to introduce the technique was Mini Moni the Movie by Shinji Higuchi in 2002, predated by Rest In Peace by Stolpskott Film (2000). Others include:

=== Released ===
- Rest in Peace (Sweden, 2000) – Shot entirely with green-screen. Some sections fully CGI.
- Casshern (Japan, 2004) – Shot on celluloid. A few practical set pieces used.
- Able Edwards (United States, 2004) – Shot digitally on Canon XL1 cameras.
- Immortal (France, 2004) – Shot on celluloid. Also showed CGI characters interacting with live actors.
- Sky Captain and the World of Tomorrow (United States, 2004) – Shot digitally on Sony CineAlta cameras.
- Sin City (United States, 2005) – Shot digitally on CineAlta cameras. Three practical sets used.
- MirrorMask (United States/United Kingdom, 2005) – Shot on celluloid. 80% of film uses digital backlot. Some practical set pieces used.
- The Cabinet of Dr. Caligari (United States, 2005) – Shot digitally.
- 300 (United States, 2007) – Shot on celluloid. Two practical sets used.
- Speed Racer (United States, 2008) – Directed by the Wachowskis. Three practical sets used.
- The Spirit (United States, 2008) – Director Frank Miller shot the film with the same techniques he and Robert Rodriguez used on Sin City.
- Avatar (United States, 2009) – Directed by James Cameron. Two practical sets used.
- Goemon (Japan, 2009) – The second film from Casshern helmer Kazuaki Kiriya.
- Alice in Wonderland (United States, 2010) – Directed by Tim Burton. Practical sets used.
- Sin City: A Dame to Kill For (United States 2014) – Co-directed by Robert Rodriguez and Frank Miller. Sequel to Sin City.

=== Upcoming ===
- Tribes of October

== See also ==
- Computer-generated imagery
- Digital cinema
- Digital cinematography
- Filmizing
- Live-action/animated film
- virtual studio
