= The Mechanical Monsters =

- Title card from The Mechanical Monsters
- Directed by: Dave Fleischer
- Story by: Seymour Kneitel; Isidore Sparber
- Based on: Superman by: Jerry Siegel; Joe Shuster
- Produced by: Max Fleischer
- Starring: Bud Collyer; Joan Alexander; Tedd Pierce
- Music by: Sammy Timberg; Winston Sharples (uncredited); Lou Fleischer (uncredited)
- Animation by: Steve Muffati; George Germanetti
- Color process: Technicolor
- Production company: Fleischer Studios
- Distributed by: Paramount Pictures
- Release date: November 28, 1941
- Running time: 9 minutes (one reel)
- Language: English

The Mechanical Monsters is the second of seventeen animated Technicolor short films based upon the DC Comics character Superman. Produced by Fleischer Studios, the short details Superman opposing a villainous inventor and his army of robots. It was originally released by Paramount Pictures on November 28, 1941.

== Plot ==
Full film

As word spreads about a bank robbery committed by a villainous inventor via an army of robots he created, Clark Kent is covering a museum exhibition that showcases the world's rarest jewels for the Daily Planet. He is greeted by Lois Lane, who intends to cover the story as well, just before one of the inventor's robots infiltrates the museum, with the police failing to stop it. Museum visitors, including Clark and Lois, soon flee as the robot begins loading the jewels into a compartment within its torso. While Clark phones in the story, Lois sneaks into the robot's compartment before it leaves the museum and takes to the sky. Clark notices Lois is gone as he goes back into the phone booth to become Superman.

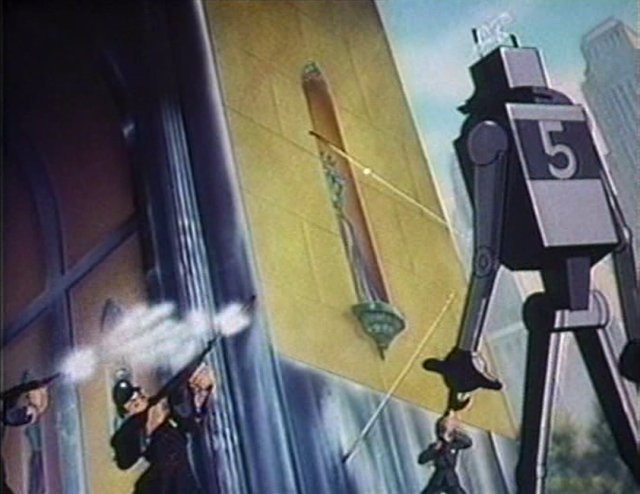
A scene from the short detailing one of its titular robots on the attack.

Flying high above the city, Superman spots the robot and uses his X-ray vision to see Lois inside it. He lands on the robot and struggles to open its compartment before it maneuvers itself into an inverted position and throws him off into an overhead power line, tangling him in its wires. Its compartment opens up and all the jewels spill out, while Lois holds onto its hatch for dear life until the robot flips back over and arrives at its creator's lair as Superman frees himself from the wires. When Lois refuses to tell the inventor what became of the jewels at his demand, he begins lowering her towards a pot of molten metal in what appears to be an industrial foundry.

Superman soon infiltrates the inventor's lair, only to oppose his robots; they appear to gain the upper hand, but Superman is undeterred and vanquishes them all as the inventor is sent running. He then threatens to drop Lois into the metal's pot if Superman comes closer, but he manages to save her and shields himself and Lois from the metal using his cape when the inventor attempts to douse them with it. Superman soon seizes the inventor before escaping with Lois in tow. The stolen jewels and bank money are recovered while the inventor gets sent to jail. Afterwards, Clark compliments Lois for her article covering the whole story; she remarks that she owed it all to Superman.

== Cast ==
- Bud Collyer as Clark Kent / Superman
- Joan Alexander as Lois Lane
- Tedd Pierce as Police Officer / Inventor of the Mechanical Monsters
- George Lowther or Grant Richards as the Opening Narrator (unconfirmed)

== Production notes ==
The short film marks the only instance in which Superman is depicted using X-ray vision in a Fleischer short.

Superman's aerial abilities are limited to leaping long distances and heights, and he does not explicitly fly yet. The Fleischers, after being dissatisfied with the results of this in animation, successfully petitioned National Comics to allow them to depict Superman with the ability to fly, a superpower eventually added to the comics by 1943.

== References in later works ==
The Mechanical Monsters is the first story (from any medium) that features Clark Kent using a telephone booth to discard his street clothes and become Superman. This plot device would thereafter become commonly associated with the character.

The Mechanical Monsters is referenced in Hayao Miyazaki's animated film Castle in the Sky.

The short film was parodied on The Disney Afternoon series The Shnookums & Meat Funny Cartoon Show in the Pith Possum segment "Darkness on the Edge of Black" (part of episode 2).

Historians also point out the similarity between the robot in episode 155 of the anime series Lupin the Third Part II, "Farewell My Beloved Lupin" (also written and directed by Hayao Miyazaki), and the ones in The Mechanical Monsters.

One of the short's titular robots is seen on display in Superman's Fortress of Solitude in the 2007 animated film Superman: Doomsday. As well as in the Legion of Superheroes episode, "Message in a Bottle."

During a second season episode of the HBO drama television series The Wire, a character can be seen watching The Mechanical Monsters on television, paralleling a robbery that is about to occur.

In 2011, animator Robb Pratt posted the short Superman Classic to his YouTube channel. In the short, the hero confronts giant robots, most of which are seen flying in the same manner as the ones from the short; at one point, he picks up a toy robot that also somewhat resembles one of them.

In 2013, Sean "Smeghead" Moore, creator of the web series Cinematic Excrement, created a humorous commentary track for the short.

Between 2013 and 2015, comic book creator Brian Fies released a webcomic entitled The Last Mechanical Monster, which acts as a sequel to The Mechanical Monsters.

In the Young Justice episode, "Og Htrof Dna Reuqnoc!", the second news report about Superman is shown to have been broadcast on November 28 at 19:41 and accounts his battle with "mechanical monsters".
