= Carneia =

Ancient Greek festival

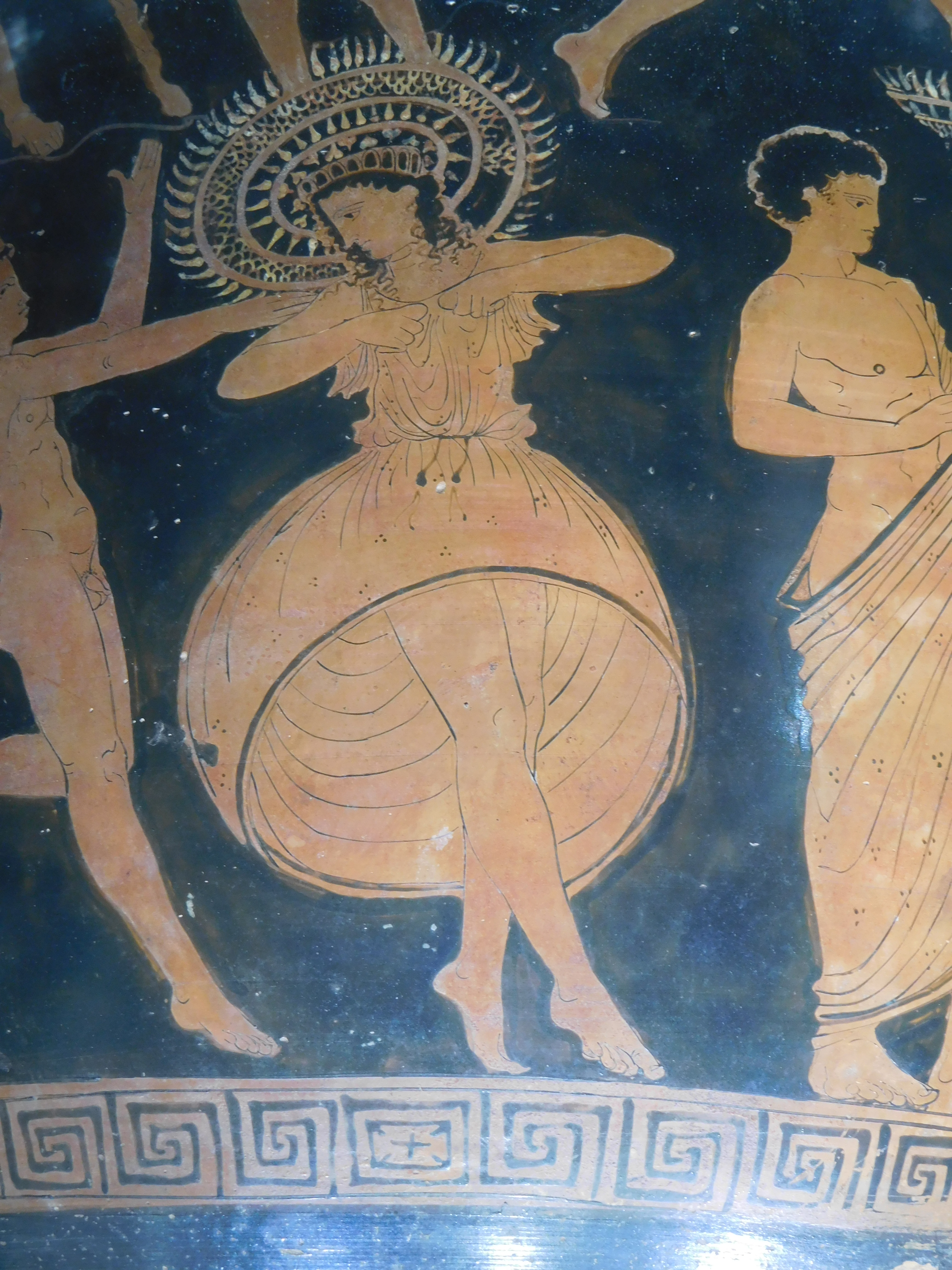
Male dancer at festival of Apollo Karneios, wearing kalatiskos hat in the temple of Karneios, 5th century BC, from Ceglie del Campo

Carneia (Ancient Greek: Κάρνεια or Καρνεῖα) or Carnea (Κάρνεα) was one of the tribal traditional festivals of Sparta, the Peloponnese and Doric cities in Magna Grecia, held in honor of Apollo Karneios. Whether Carneus (or Carnus) was originally an old Peloponnesian divinity subsequently identified with Apollo, or merely an "emanation" from him, is uncertain; but there seems no reason to doubt that Carneus means "the god of flocks and herds" (Hesychius, s.v. Κάρνος), in a wider sense, of the harvest and the vintage. The chief centre of his worship was Sparta, where the Carneia took place every year from the 7th to the 15th of the month Carneus (i.e. Metageitnion, August). During this period all military operations were suspended.

== Background ==
The Carneia appears to have been at once agrarian, military and piacular in character. In the last aspect it is supposed to commemorate the death of Carnus, an Acarnanian seer and favourite of Apollo, who, being suspected of espionage, was slain by one of the Heraclidae during the passage of the Dorians from Naupactus to Peloponnesus. By way of punishment, Apollo visited the army with a pestilence, which only ceased after the institution of the Carneia. The tradition is probably intended to explain the sacrifice of an animal (perhaps a later substitute for a human being) as the representative of the god. The agrarian and military sides of the festival are clearly distinguished.

The importance attached to the festival and its month is shown in several instances. It was responsible for the delay which prevented the Spartans from assisting the Athenians at the Battle of Marathon. Again, when Epidaurus was attacked in 419 by Argos, the movements of the Spartans under Agis against the latter were interrupted until the end of the month, while the Argives (on whom, as Dorians, the custom was equally binding), by manipulating the calendar, avoided the necessity of suspending operations.

This festival is also the reason behind the dispatch of a small advance guard under Leonidas instead of the main Spartan force during the Battle of Thermopylae.

The Carneia was also celebrated in the city of Cyrene in North Africa, as attested in Pindar's fifth Pythian ode and Callimachus's hymn to Apollo.

== Details ==
Five unmarried youths (Ancient Greek: Καρνεᾶται) were chosen by lot from each [tribe] for four years, to superintend the proceedings, the officiating priest being called Ancient Greek: ἀγητής ("leader"). A man decked with garlands (possibly the priest himself) started running, pursued by a band of young men called Ancient Greek: σταφυλοδρόμοι ("running with bunches of grapes in their hands"); if he was caught, it was a guarantee of good fortune to the city; if not, the reverse.

In the second part of the festival nine tents were set up in the country, in each of which nine citizens, representing the phratries (or obae), feasted together in honour of the god (for huts or booths extemporized as shelters; see W. Warde Fowler in Classical Review, March 1908, on the country festival in Tibullus ii. I). According to Demetrius of Scepsis (in Athenaeus iv. 141), the Carneia was an imitation of life in camp, and everything was done in accordance with the command of a herald. In regard to the sacrifice, which doubtless formed part of the ceremonial, all that is known is that a ram was sacrificed at Thurii. Other indications point to the festival having assumed a military character at an early date, as might have been expected among the warlike Dorians, although some scholars deny this. The general meaning of the agrarian ceremony is clear, and has numerous parallels in north European harvest-customs, in which an animal (or man disguised as an animal) was pursued by the reapers, the animal if caught being usually killed; in any case, both the man and the animal represent the vegetation spirit. E. H. Binney in Classical Review (March 1905) suggests that the story of Alcestis was performed at the Carneia (to which it may have become attached with the name of Apollo) as a vegetation drama, and "embodied a Death and Resurrection ceremony."
