= Chalcis (disambiguation) =

Chalcis (Greek: Χαλκίς) is a city on the Euripus Strait between the island of Euboea and the Greek mainland.

Other cities of Antiquity:

- Chalcis (Aeolis), a town of ancient Aeolis, now in Turkey
- Chalcis (Aetolia), a town of ancient Aetolia
- Chalcis (Elis), a town of ancient Elis
- Chalcis (Epirus), a town of ancient Epirus
- Chalcis ad Belum, modern Qinnasrin, Syria
- Chalcis (Thrace), modern Inecik in European Turkey
- Chalcis ad Libanum, possibly modern Anjar, Lebanon

It can be also:

- Chalcis Mountain, near the Chalcis in Aetolia
- Chalcis Province, a province in Euboea, Central region in Decentralized Administration of Thessaly and Central of Greece
- Chalcis (wasp), a genus of Chalcid wasp
- Chalcis (mythology), the naiad.

== See also ==
- Colchis
