= Gavrolimni =

Gavrolimni Γαβρολίμνη
- Community
- Location within Greece
- Coordinates: 38°22′59″N 21°37′46″E
- Country: Greece
- Administrative region: Western Greece
- Regional unit: Aetolia-Acarnania
- Municipality: Nafpaktia
- Municipal unit: Chalkeia

Area
  - Community: 11.7 km^{2} (4.5 sq mi)
- Elevation: 100 m (330 ft)

Population (2021)
  - Community: 294
  - Density: 25.1/km^{2} (65.1/sq mi)
- Time zone: UTC+2 (EET)
  - Summer (DST): UTC+3 (EEST)
- Postal code: 300 14
- Area code: 26340
- Vehicle registration: ME

Gavrolimni (Greek: Γαβρολίμνη, also: Greek: Γαυρολίμνη) is a village and a community in Aetolia-Acarnania, western Greece, part of the municipality of Nafpaktia.

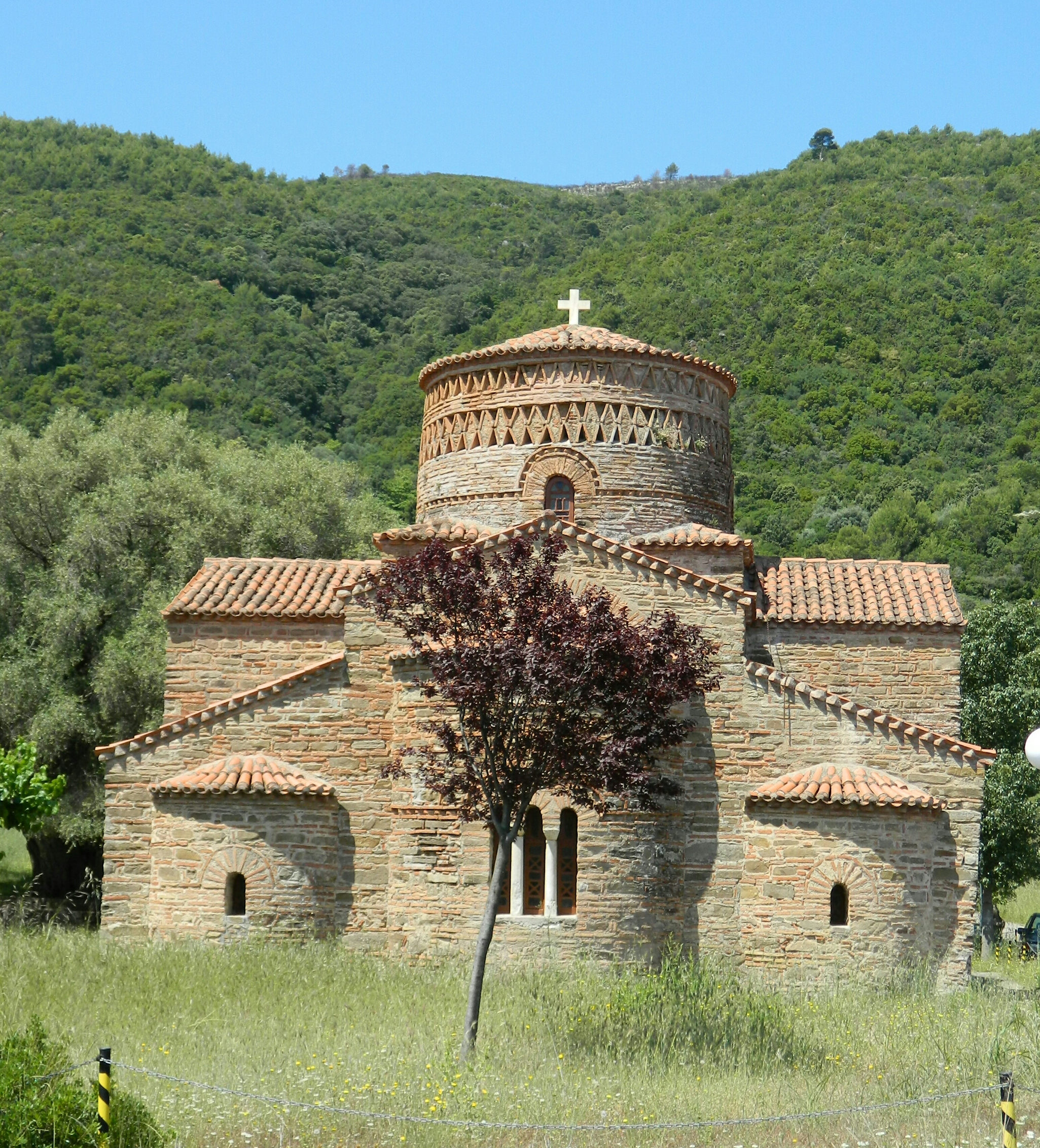
The Byzantine monastery of Panagia Panaxiotissa

== Geography ==
Gavrolimni lies at about 100 meters elevation, at the foot of the hill Kaliakouda, between the mountains Klokova and Varasova. Further north is the Evinos river. It lies 13 km northwest of Antirrio, 18 km west of Nafpaktos and 18 km east of Messolonghi. The Greek National Road 5 (Patras-Antirrio-Agrinio-Ioannina) runs through the southern part of the village. The A5 motorway passes south of the village. 2 km north of the village, in a valley where pine trees, olive trees and cypresses grow, lies the late 10th century monastery of Panagia Panaxiotissa.

== History ==
After the Greek War of Independence, Gavrolimni became part of independent Greece. In 1841 it became part of the municipality of Nafpaktos. Between 1912 and 1994 it was an independent community. In 1994, the village became part of the municipality of Chalkeia. In 2011, it became part of the municipality of Nafpaktia.

=== Historical population ===
Census	Village/Community
1844	170
1920	475
1928	249
1940	465
1951	486
1961	505
1971	478
1981	407
1991	436
2001	332
2011	187
2021	294

The Gavrolimni municipal basketball court in Chania.
