= Agrapidokampos =

Agrapidokampos Αγραπιδόκαμπος
- Settlement
- Location within Greece
- Coordinates: 38°23′35″N 21°43′31″E
- Country: Greece
- Geographic region: Western Greece
- Regional unit: Aetolia-Acarnania
- Municipality: Nafpaktia
- Municipal unit: Antirrio
- Community: Makyneia
- Elevation: 280 m (920 ft)

Population (2021)
  - Total: 4
- Time zone: UTC+2 (EET)
  - Summer (DST): UTC+3 (EEST)
- Postal code: 303 00
- Area code: 26340
- Vehicle registration: ME

Agrapidokampos (Greek: Αγραπιδόκαμπος) is a settlement forming part of the community of Makyneia in Aetolia-Acarnania, Greece. At the 2021 census, it had 4 inhabitants. The village is located 5 km north of Makyneia, 8 km northwest of Antirrio and 10 km west of Nafpaktos.

== History ==
The name of the village literally means the "field of wild pears". Ancient ruins have been preserved on the ridge between Agrapidokampos and Velvina, in the area named Elliniko. Agrapidokampos was a village of the earlier municipality of Nafpaktos until 1912, when it became part of the community of Riza (Makyneia). In 1989, Agrapidokampos became part of the municipality of Antirrio which is a municipal unit of Nafpaktia since 2011.
