= Kryoneri, Aetolia-Acarnania =

Kryoneri Κρυονέρι
- Settlement
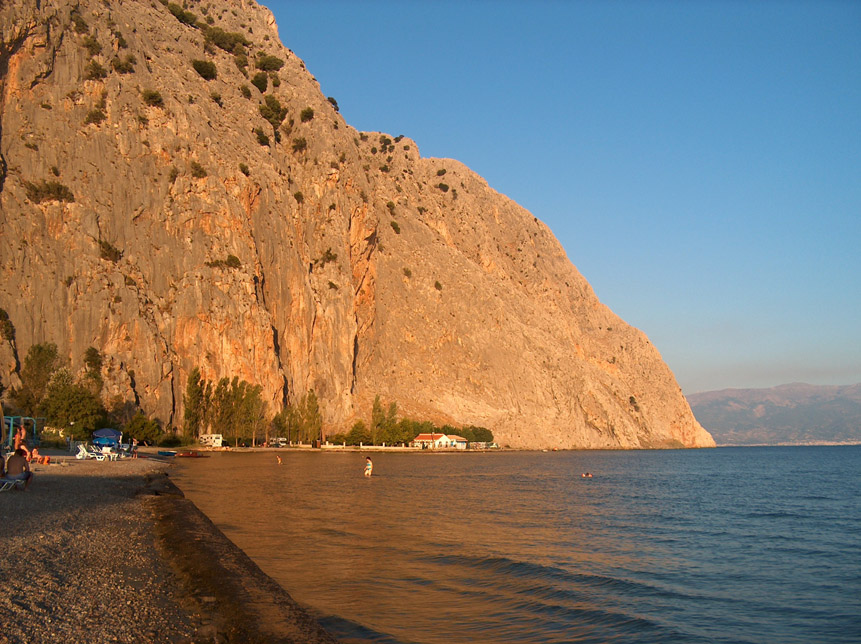

- Location within Greece
- Coordinates: 38°20′42″N 21°35′40″E
- Country: Greece
- Geographic region: Western Greece
- Regional unit: Aetolia-Acarnania
- Municipality: Nafpaktia
- Municipal unit: Chalkeia
- Community: Galatas

Population (2021)
  - Total: 74
- Time zone: UTC+2 (EET)
  - Summer (DST): UTC+3 (EEST)
- Postal code: 300 14
- Area code: 26310
- Vehicle registration: ME

Kryoneri (Greek: Κρυονέρι) is a seaside settlement in the community of Galatas, located about 14 km east from Messolonghi and west of Antirrio in Nafpaktia, Aetolia-Acarnania, Greece.

== Description ==
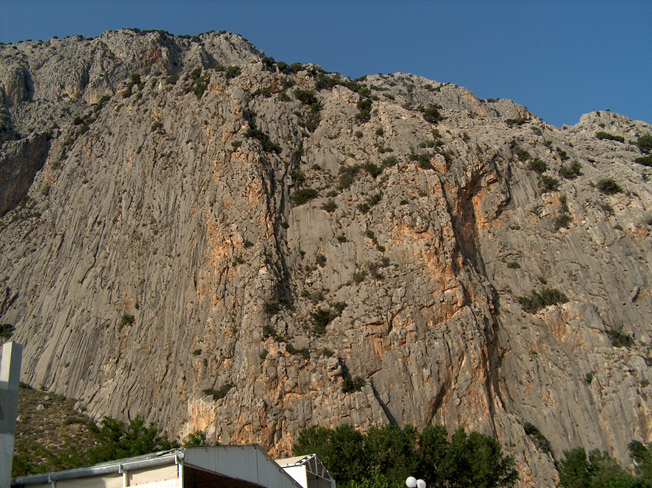
Varasova as seen from the beach

Kryoneri is situated on the northeast coast of the Gulf of Patras and lies next to the Varasova mountain, one of the most popular rock climbing areas in Greece.

== History ==
With the Kapodistrias reform of 1997, Kryoneri became part of the municipality of Chalkeia, which since 2011 is a municipal unit of the municipality of Nafpaktia.

=== Population history ===
Census	Settlement
1991	87
2001	122
2011	94
2021	74

== Notable people ==
- Giannis Tsimitselis, actor
