= Riza, Aetolia-Acarnania =

Riza
- Settlement
- Location within Greece
- Coordinates: 38°21′24″N 21°42′11″E
- Country: Greece
- Geographic region: Western Greece
- Regional unit: Aetolia-Acarnania
- Municipality: Nafpaktia
- Municipal unit: Antirrio
- Community: Makyneia
- Elevation: 50 m (160 ft)

Population (2021)
  - Total: 152
- Time zone: UTC+2 (EET)
  - Summer (DST): UTC+3 (EEST)
- Postal code: 303 00
- Area code: 26930
- Vehicle registration: ME

Riza (Greek: Ρίζα meaning roots, outside Aetolia-Acarnania: Riza Nafpaktias) is a settlement in Aetolia-Acarnania, Greece. It is part of the community of Makyneia, within the municipality of Nafpaktia.

== Geography ==
Riza is situated at the foot of the mountain Klokova, near the northeast coast of the Gulf of Patras, 6 km northwest of Antirrio. Its elevation is 50 m amsl. The Greek National Road 5 (Antirrio-Agrinio-Ioannina), which has recently been bypassed by the A5 motorway, passes through the village. In the vicinity there is a thermal spring where the water heats to 37 °C at 255 m depth and is rich in hydrogen sulfide.

== History ==
Riza was an independent community between 1912 and 1916. It was part of the community of Mamako (after 1980: Makyneia) between 1916 and 1989, when it became part of the municipality Antirrio. It became part of Nafpaktia in 2011.

=== Historical population ===
Historical population
Year	Pop.	±%
1991	148	—
2001	144	−2.7%
2011	160	+11.1%
2021	152	−5.0%
