= Agios Polykarpos, Aetolia-Acarnania =

Agios Polykarpos
- Settlement
- Location within Greece
- Coordinates: 38°21′03″N 21°42′10″E
- Country: Greece
- Geographic region: Western Greece
- Regional unit: Aetolia-Acarnania
- Municipality: Nafpaktia
- Municipal unit: Antirrio
- Community: Makyneia

Population (2021)
  - Total: 26
- Time zone: UTC+2 (EET)
  - Summer (DST): UTC+3 (EEST)
- Postal code: 303 00
- Area code: 26340
- Vehicle registration: ME

Agios Polykarpos (Greek: Άγιος Πολύκαρπος) is a seaside settlement in Nafpaktia, Aetolia-Acarnania, Greece, located 6 km west of Antirrio and 15 km southwest of Nafpaktos. According to the 2021 census, it had 26 inhabitants.

== Description ==
The settlement is named after the church of Saint Polycarpus.

In 1981, Agios Polykarpos became a settlement of the community of Makyneia. In 1989, Agios Polykarpos became part of the municipality of Antirrio, which is a municipal unit of the municipality of Nafpaktia since 2011.
