= Velvina, Aetolia-Acarnania =

Velvina Βελβίνα
- Community
- Location within Greece
- Coordinates: 38°23′50″N 21°45′54″E
- Country: Greece
- Administrative region: Western Greece
- Regional unit: Aetolia-Acarnania
- Municipality: Nafpaktia
- Municipal unit: Nafpaktos
- Elevation: 170 m (560 ft)

Population (2021)
  - Community: 43
- Time zone: UTC+2 (EET)
  - Summer (DST): UTC+3 (EEST)
- Postal code: 303 00
- Area code: 26340
- Vehicle registration: ME

Velvina (Greek: Βελβίνα) is a village and a community in the municipal unit of Nafpaktos in Nafpaktia, Aetolia-Acarnania, Greece. According to the 2021 census, it had 43 inhabitants.

The village is about 9 km west of Nafpaktos. It is located at the foot of a northeastern foothill of Klokova and is on the right bank of the creek named Varia. In the vicinity toward the south is the ancient city of Molykreio, where an ancient temple is located.

== History ==
Formerly part of the municipality of Nafpaktos, it became part of the community of Moui Agiou Georgiou (renamed to Molykreio in 1919) in 1912. Velvina became an independent community in 1946. It rejoined the municipality of Nafpaktos in 1997, and became part of the municipality of Nafpaktia in 2011.

=== Historical population ===
Historical population
Year	Pop.	±%
2001	99	—
2011	57	−42.4%
2021	43	−24.6%
