= Platanitis =

Platanitis Πλατανίτης
- Settlement
- Location within Greece
- Coordinates: 38°21′43″N 21°46′38″E
- Country: Greece
- Administrative region: Western Greece
- Regional unit: Aetolia-Acarnania
- Municipality: Nafpaktia
- Municipal unit: Antirrio
- Community: Molykreio

Population (2021)
  - Total: 672
- Time zone: UTC+2 (EET)
  - Summer (DST): UTC+3 (EEST)
- Postal code: 300 20
- Area code: 26340
- Vehicle registration: ME

Platanitis (Greek: Πλατανίτης) is a settlement belonging to the community of Molykreio in Nafpaktia, Aetolia-Acarnania, Greece.

== Geography ==
Platanitis is situated at the northwestern shore of the Gulf of Corinth, about 4 km northeast of Antirrio and the Rio–Antirrio bridge and 6.5 km southwest of Nafpaktos. The Greek National Road 48/E65 (Antirrio-Nafpaktos-Livadeia) runs through the village. There is a stone bridge over the small stream Platanorema (Kakavos), built in the late 19th century. Uphill towards the northwest is the smaller settlement of Ano Platanitis, also part of the community of Molykreio.

== History ==
In 1951 Platanitis was recognized as a settlement within the community of Molykreio. In 1989, it became part of the municipality of Antirrio and in 2011 it became part of the municipality of Nafpaktia.

=== Historical population ===
Historical population
Year	Pop.	±%
1991	171	—
2001	363	+112.3%
2011	606	+66.9%
2021	672	+10.9%
