= Macynia =

Coordinates: 38°21′20″N 21°43′26″E

Macynia or Makynia (Ancient Greek: Μακυνία), Macyna or Makyna (Μακύνα), or Macyneia or Makyneia (Μακύνεια), was a coastal town of ancient Aetolia at the foot of the eastern slope of Mount Taphiassus. According to Strabo it was built after the return of the Heraclidae into Peloponnesus. It is called a town of the Ozolian Locrians by the poet Archytas of Amphissa, who describes it in a hexameter line: "the grape-clad, perfume-breathing, lovely Macȳna." It is also mentioned in an epigram of Alcaeus of Messene, who was a contemporary of Philip V of Macedon. Pliny mentions a mountain Macynium, which must have been part of Mount Taphiassus, near Macynia, unless it is indeed a mistake for the town.

Its site is tentatively located near the modern Makyneia.
