= Archytas (disambiguation) =

Archytas (428–347 BC) was an Ancient Greek philosopher, mathematician, astronomer, statesman, and strategist

Archytas can also refer to:

- Archytas of Amphissa, a Greek poet who lived around the 3rd or 4th century BCE
- Archytas of Mytilene, an ancient Greek musician whose date is uncertain
- Archytas (crater), a lunar impact crater
- Archytas (fly), a genus of flies in the family Tachinidae
- 14995 Archytas, a main-belt asteroid
