= Galatas, Aetolia-Acarnania =

Galatas Γαλατάς
- Community
- Location within Greece
- Coordinates: 38°21′9″N 21°33′36″E
- Country: Greece
- Administrative region: Western Greece
- Regional unit: Aetolia-Acarnania
- Municipality: Nafpaktia
- Municipal unit: Chalkeia

Area
  - Community: 27.7 km^{2} (10.7 sq mi)

Population (2021)
  - Community: 965
  - Density: 34.8/km^{2} (90.2/sq mi)
- Time zone: UTC+2 (EET)
  - Summer (DST): UTC+3 (EEST)
- Postal code: 300 14
- Area code: 26310
- Vehicle registration: ME
- Website: www.galatas.gr

Galatas (Greek: Γαλατάς) is a village and a community in western Chalkeia, Nafpaktia, Aetolia-Acarnania, Greece located at 14 m above sea level. The community includes the village Kryoneri.

== Geography ==
Galatas sits at the foot of the mountain Varasova, at the left bank of the river Evinos. It lies 2 km east of Evinochori, 11 km east of Missolonghi, 18 km west of Antirrio and 25 km west of Nafpaktos. The Greek National Road 5 (Patras-Antirrio-Agrinio-Ioannina) and the A5 motorway pass north of the village.

== History ==
Galatas had its own train station on the currently abandoned railway line from the port of Kryoneri to Agrinio via Missolonghi and Stamna. Between 1912 and 1997, Galatas was an independent community. In 1997, the village became part of the municipality of Chalkeia, which became part of the new municipality of Nafpaktia in 2011.

=== Historical population ===
Census	Village	Community
2001	988	1,098
2011	976	1,070
2021	891	965
