= Tsoukalaiika =

Tsoukalaiika may refer to the following places in Greece:

- Tsoukalaiika, Achaea, a village in the municipal unit Vrachnaiika, Achaea
- Tsoukalaiika, Messenia, a village in the municipal unit Meligalas, Messenia
