= Rhieia =

Ancient Greek athletic festival

The first version of this article has been based in the text of el:Ρίεια of the Greek Wikipedia published under GFDL.

Rhieia (Greek: Ρίεια, modern transliterations: Rieia or Riia) was a sporting event that took place during the ancient times. The game was held in the town of Antirrio. Little information about the games is now available and manuscripts are now lost.
