= 10th-century Byzantine domes =

The cross-in-square is the most common church plan from the 10th century until the fall of Constantinople in 1453. This type of plan, with four columns supporting the dome at the crossing, was best suited for domes less than 7 meters (23 ft) wide and, from the 10th to the 14th centuries, a typical Byzantine dome measured less than 6 meters (20 ft) in diameter. For domes beyond that width, variations in the plan were required such as using piers in place of the columns and incorporating further buttressing around the core of the building. The distinctive rippling eaves design for the roofs of domes began in the 10th century. In mainland Greece, circular or octagonal drums became the most common.

== Constantinople ==
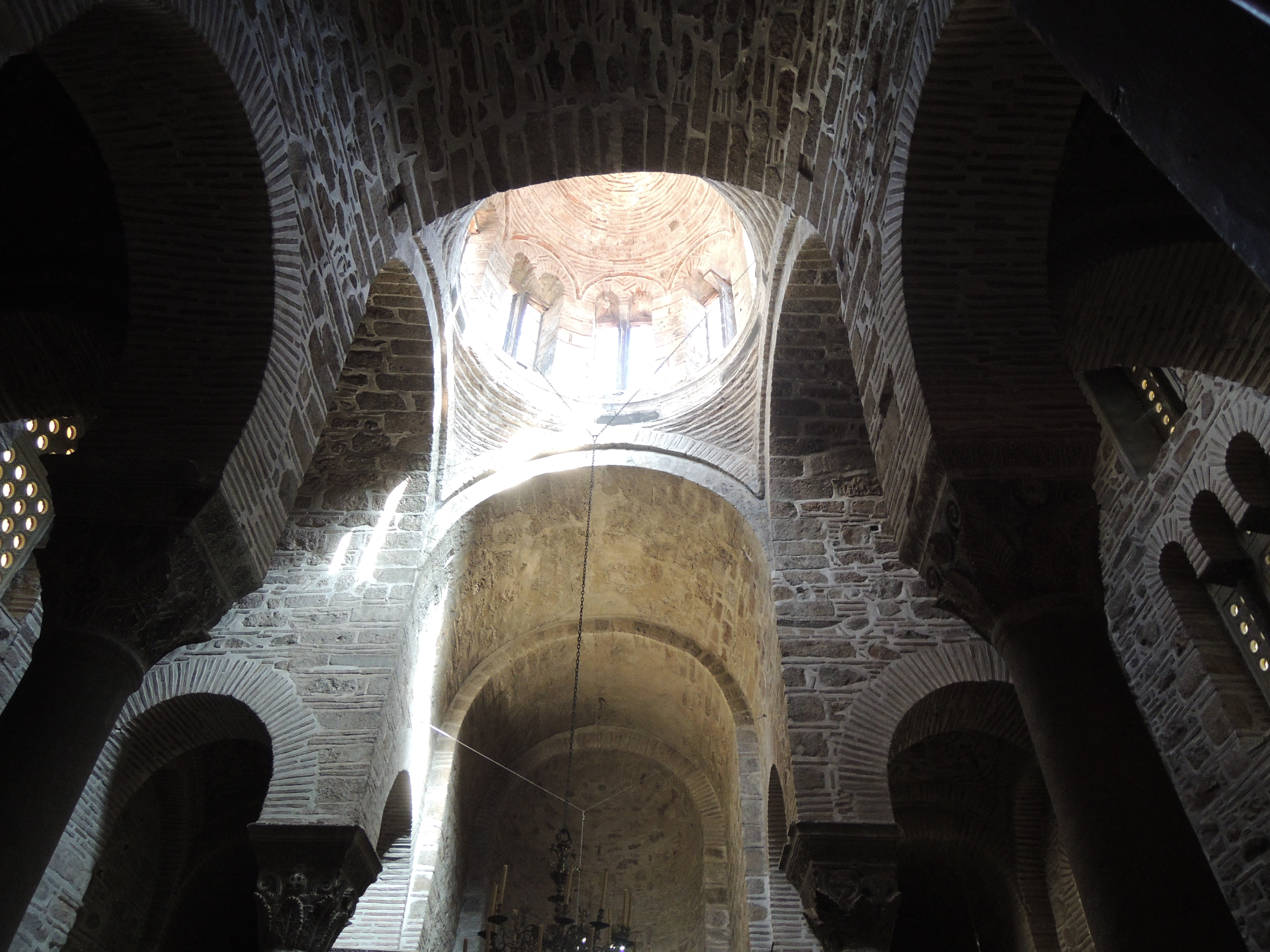
The Hosios Loukas Panagia church near Distomo, Greece

In the Middle Byzantine period, more complex plans emerge, such as the integrated chapels of Theotokos of Lips, a monastic church in Constantinople that was built around 907. It included four small chapels on its second floor gallery level that may have been domed.

The palace chapel of the Myrelaion in Constantinople was built around 920 as a cross-in-square church and remains a good example. Another example of a 10th century cross-in-square church in Constantinople is A. Ioannēs en tō Troullō.

John I Tzimiskes built a chapel with a dome and two semidomes near the Great Palace and dedicated to Christ the Savior. It may have been built on an elevated platform. It was demolished in 1804.

== Greece ==
The earliest cross-in-square in Greece is the Panagia church at the monastery of Hosios Loukas, dated to the late 10th century, but variations of the type can be found from southern Italy to Russia and Anatolia. They served in a wide variety of church roles, including domestic, parish, monastic, palatial, and funerary.

Other examples of 10th century cross-in-square churches include the katholicon of the Great Lavra monastery, A. Germanos in Prespa, Panagia Panaxiotissa Church, Church of the Holy Apostles in Athens, the katholikon of Vatopedi monastery, the chapel of A. Dēmētrios at Vatopedi monastery, the katholikon of the Monastery of Iviron, the A. Ioannēs prod. chapel at the Monastery of Iviron, and the old katholikon of Xenophontos Monastery.

== Cyprus ==
A. Antonios in Kellia, Cyprus is a 10th century cross-in-square church.

== Southern Italy ==
In southern Italy, examples include the 8th or 10th century Tempietto di Seppannibale, the 10th century church of San Giorgio dei Martiri, and the 10th century church of San Pietro in Otranto. That southern Italy was reconquered and ruled by a Byzantine governor from about 970 to 1071 explains the relatively large number of small and rustic Middle Byzantine-style churches found there, including the Cattolica in Stilo and S. Marco in Rossano. Both are cross-in-square churches with five small domes on drums in a quincunx pattern and date either to the period of Byzantine rule or after.

== See also ==
- List of Roman domes
- History of architecture
