= Damaskinos of Athens =

Greek politician and priest (1891–1949)

His Beatitude Damaskinos
- Archbishop of Athens
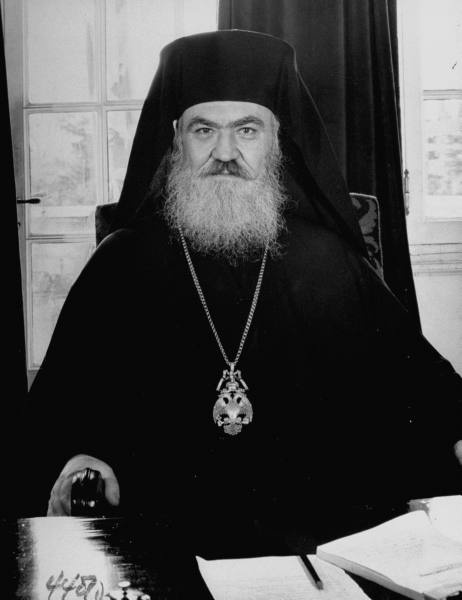
- Archbishop Damaskinos, 1945

Regent of Greece
- In office 31 December 1944 – 27 September 1946
- Prime Minister: Georgios Papandreou; Nikolaos Plastiras; Petros Voulgaris; Himself; Panagiotis Kanellopoulos; Themistoklis Sofoulis; Panagiotis Poulitsas; Konstantinos Tsaldaris
- Preceded by: George II (as King of the Hellenes)
- Succeeded by: George II (as King of the Hellenes)

Prime Minister of Greece
- In office 17 October 1945 – 1 November 1945
- Monarch: George II
- Regent: Himself
- Preceded by: Petros Voulgaris
- Succeeded by: Panagiotis Kanellopoulos
- Archbishop of Athens
- Installed: 2 July 1941
- Term ended: 20 May 1949
- Predecessor: Chrysanthus
- Successor: Spyridon

Personal details
- Born: Dimitrios Papandreou (Δημήτριος Παπανδρέου); 3 March 1891 Dorvitsa, Kingdom of Greece
- Died: 20 May 1949 (aged 58) Athens, Kingdom of Greece

Archbishop Damaskinos Papandreou (Greek: Αρχιεπίσκοπος Δαμασκηνός Παπανδρέου), born Dimitrios Papandreou (Greek: Δημήτριος Παπανδρέου; 3 March 1891 – 20 May 1949), was the archbishop of Athens and All Greece from 1941 until his death in 1949. He was also the regent of Greece between the pull-out of the German occupation force in 1944 and the return of King George II to Greece in 1946. His rule was between the liberation of Greece from the Axis occupation of Greece during World War II and the Greek Civil War.

== Early life ==
He was born Dimitrios Papandreou (no relation to the Papandreou political family from Achaea) in Dorvitsa, Greece. He enlisted in the Hellenic Army during the Balkan Wars. He was ordained a Greek Orthodox Church priest in 1917. In 1922, he was made Bishop of Corinth. He spent the early 1930s as an ambassador of the Ecumenical Patriarch in the United States, where he labored to help organize the Greek Orthodox Archdiocese of America.

== Election to the Archbishopric of Athens ==
In 1938, he was elected Archbishop of Athens, taking the name Damaskinos. Ioannis Metaxas, dictator of Greece at the time, objected to Damaskinos and forced the cancellation of his election and the appointment of Metropolitan Chrysanthus to the post. After the 1941 German invasion of Greece and the fall of the Greek government, the Metropolitans who had elected Damaskinos seized the opportunity to eject Chrysanthus from the throne (with German agreement, as the latter had refused to be present at the oath-taking ceremony of the quisling Prime Minister Georgios Tsolakoglu), and Damaskinos was reinstalled.

== Nazi occupation ==
The Archbishop of Athens was the spiritual leader of the Greek Orthodox people of Athens and All Greece, and Damaskinos worked very hard to live up to his position during those hard times. He frequently clashed with the German authorities and the Quisling government. The Germans took Greeks hostage and threatened to execute their hostages in the event of resistance. Damaskinos often visited hostages in prison the night before their executions to offer spiritual comfort to the doomed. The archbishop frequently sent his lawyer, Iannis Yeorgakis, to argue for freedom on behalf of Greeks tried in German military courts. In December 1942, Yeorgakis was banned from representing Greeks before the military courts after supposedly insulting a military judge. Initially, Yeorgakis accompanied those convicted by the military courts to their executions to offer moral support, but he found this duty to be so hollowing and heart-breaking that he ceased.

In 1943, the Germans began the extermination of the Jews of Greece, and their deportations to Nazi concentration camps. Damaskinos formally protested the actions of the occupational authorities.

Damaskinos first spoke out on behalf of the Jews in March 1943 when he published public letters addressed to Prime Minister Konstantinos Logothetopoulos of the Hellenic State and Günther Altenburg of the Auswärtiges Amt, which together with the Wehrmacht administered Greece. Using his moral authority as archbishop of Athens, Damaskinos also had 19 distinguished Greeks from the arts, the law, academia and business worlds co-sign his letter. Referring to the deportation of the Jews of Thessaloniki to the Auschwitz death camp, which already began earlier in March 1943, Damaskinos wrote that he and others in the Orthodox faith followed the words of St. Paul that "there is neither Jew nor Greek". Altenburg in his reply to the archbishop denied that the Jews of Thessaloniki (which was one of the largest Jewish communities in the Balkans) were being exterminated when they arrived in Poland, claiming that they were merely sent to Poland to work in factories while Logothetopoulos never replied.

According to the International Raoul Wallenberg Foundation, the appeal of Damaskinos and his fellow Greeks is unique as no document similar to the protest against the Nazis during World War II has come to light in any other European country.

The letter in part reads:

The Greek Orthodox Church and the Academic World of Greek People Protest against the Persecution... The Greek people were... deeply grieved to learn that the German Occupation Authorities have already started to put into effect a program of gradual deportation of the Greek Jewish community... and that the first groups of deportees are already on their way to Poland...

According to the terms of the armistice, all Greek citizens, without distinction of race or religion, were to be treated equally by the Occupation Authorities. The Greek Jews have proven themselves... valuable contributors to the economic growth of the country [and] law-abiding citizens who fully understand their duties as Greeks. They have made sacrifices for the Greek country, and were always on the front lines of the struggle of the Greek nation to defend its inalienable historical rights...

In our national consciousness, all the children of Mother Greece are an inseparable unity: they are equal members of the national body irrespective of religion... Our holy religion does not recognize superior or inferior qualities based on race or religion, as it is stated: 'There is neither Jew nor Greek' and thus condemns any attempt to discriminate or create racial or religious differences. Our common fate both in days of glory and in periods of national misfortune forged inseparable bonds between all Greek citizens, without exemption, irrespective of race...

Today we are... deeply concerned with the fate of 60,000 of our fellow citizens who are Jews... we have lived together in both slavery and freedom, and we have come to appreciate their feelings, their brotherly attitude, their economic activity, and most important, their indefectible patriotism...

Damaskinos went on to publish the letter, even though the local Schutzstaffel (SS) commander, Jürgen Stroop, threatened to execute him by firing squad. Damaskinos's famous response to him was:

According to the traditions of the Greek Orthodox Church, our prelates are hanged, not shot. Please respect our traditions!

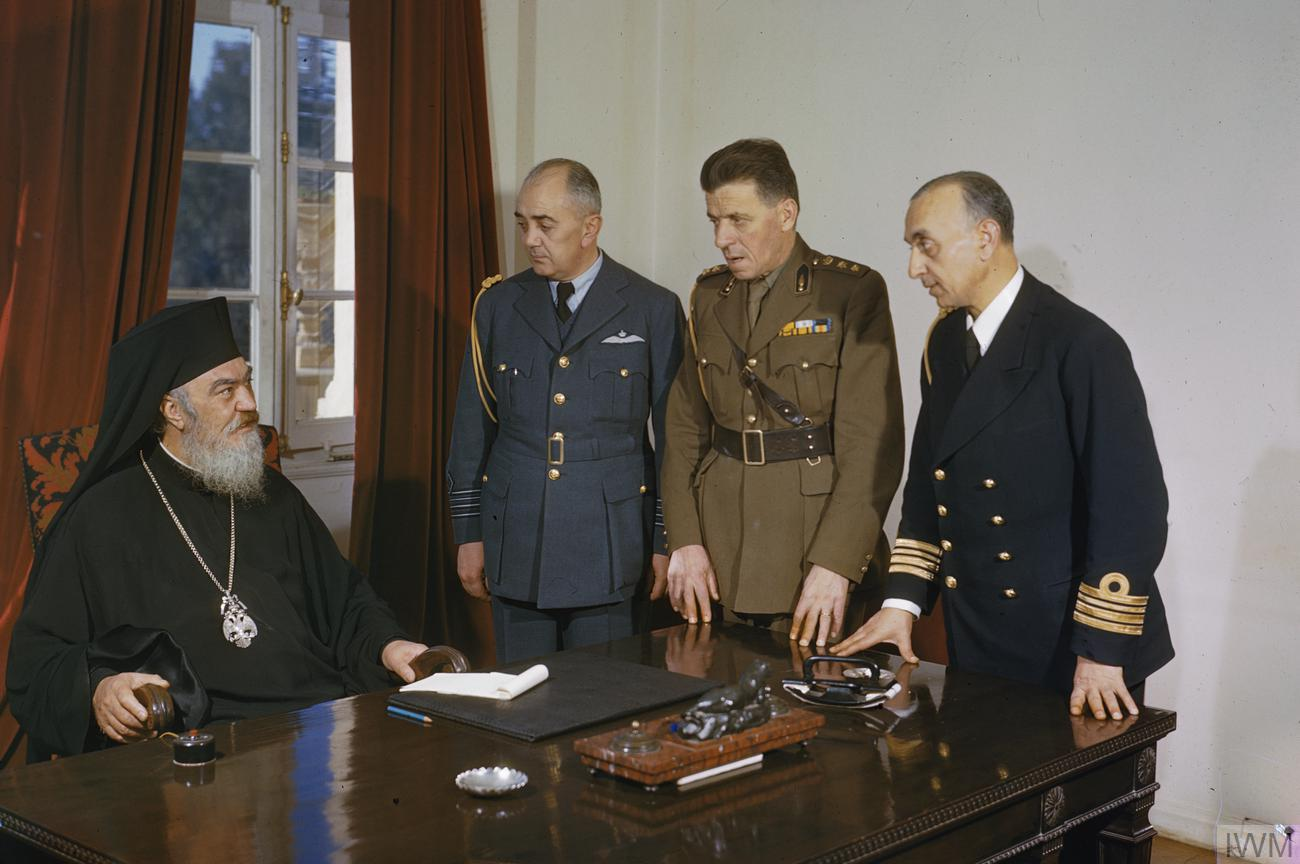
Damaskinos as regent of Greece with the chiefs of the armed forces, February 1945

When the occupying forces decided to execute 50 Greeks in retaliation for sabotage, Archbishop Damaskinos went in person to the office of the supreme German military commander, who initially refused to receive him. In response, the Archbishop stayed in the building and waited for him. Finally, after some persistence, the commander let him in, and after a discussion, the commander revoked his decision to execute Damaskinos.

The churches under his jurisdiction were also ordered quietly by Damaskinos to distribute Christian baptismal certificates to Jews fleeing the Nazis, thus saving thousands of Romaniote Jews in and around Athens. Damaskinos advised his priests to do everything they could to help the Jews and to hide those for whom it was not possible to forge baptismal certificates. For his actions in saving Greek Jews during the Holocaust, he was named among the Righteous Among the Nations distinction by Yad Vashem.

== After the liberation ==
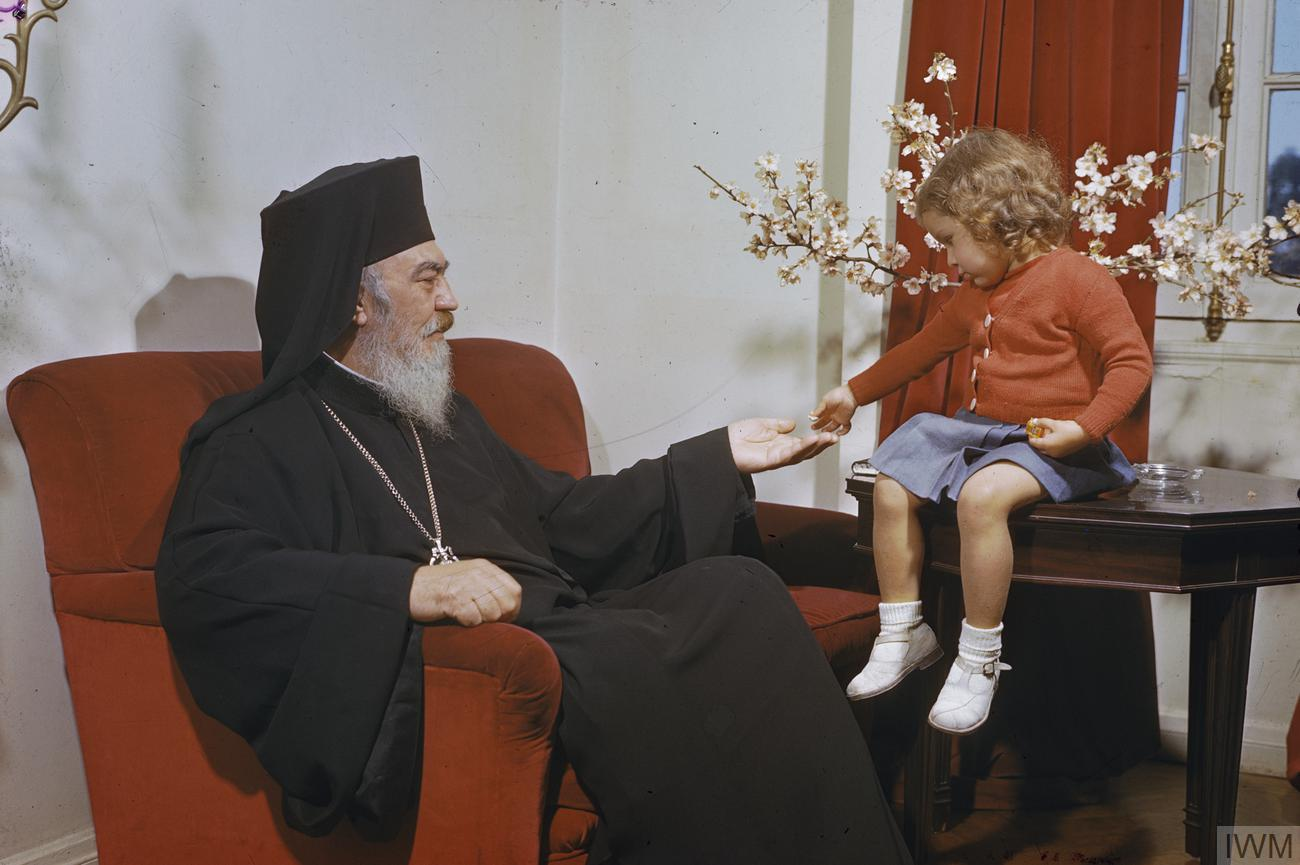
Damaskinos, Archbishop and Regent of Greece, with Chloe, daughter of his adviser John Georgakis, Athens, 15 February 1945.

After the occupation ended, Damaskinos was proclaimed regent of Greece until a referendum was held for the return of King George II from exile. Harold Macmillan, the junior British minister in charge of Mediterranean affairs, met Damaskinos on 14 December 1944 and wrote his impression:

"I was impressed by the wide grasp of European politics, the good sense, humor, and courage of this ecclesiastic. He is willing to accept the regency, but realises the difficulties. He shares our view that there must be no reprisals and no counter-revolution".

The king was opposed to the idea of a regency and used his friendship with Winston Churchill to turn the prime minister completely against Damaskinos, saying he was both a Communist and a collaborator. Based on what he had heard from the king, Churchill called Damaskinos a "pestilent priest, a survival from the Middle Ages". During this time, fighting broke out between pro-royalist Greek soldiers and communist partisans in the Dekemvriana events. He took control of the situation in his early term, appointing himself Prime Minister in late 1945. Though he wielded little power in his latter term, Damaskinos continued to call for peace and order in the country.

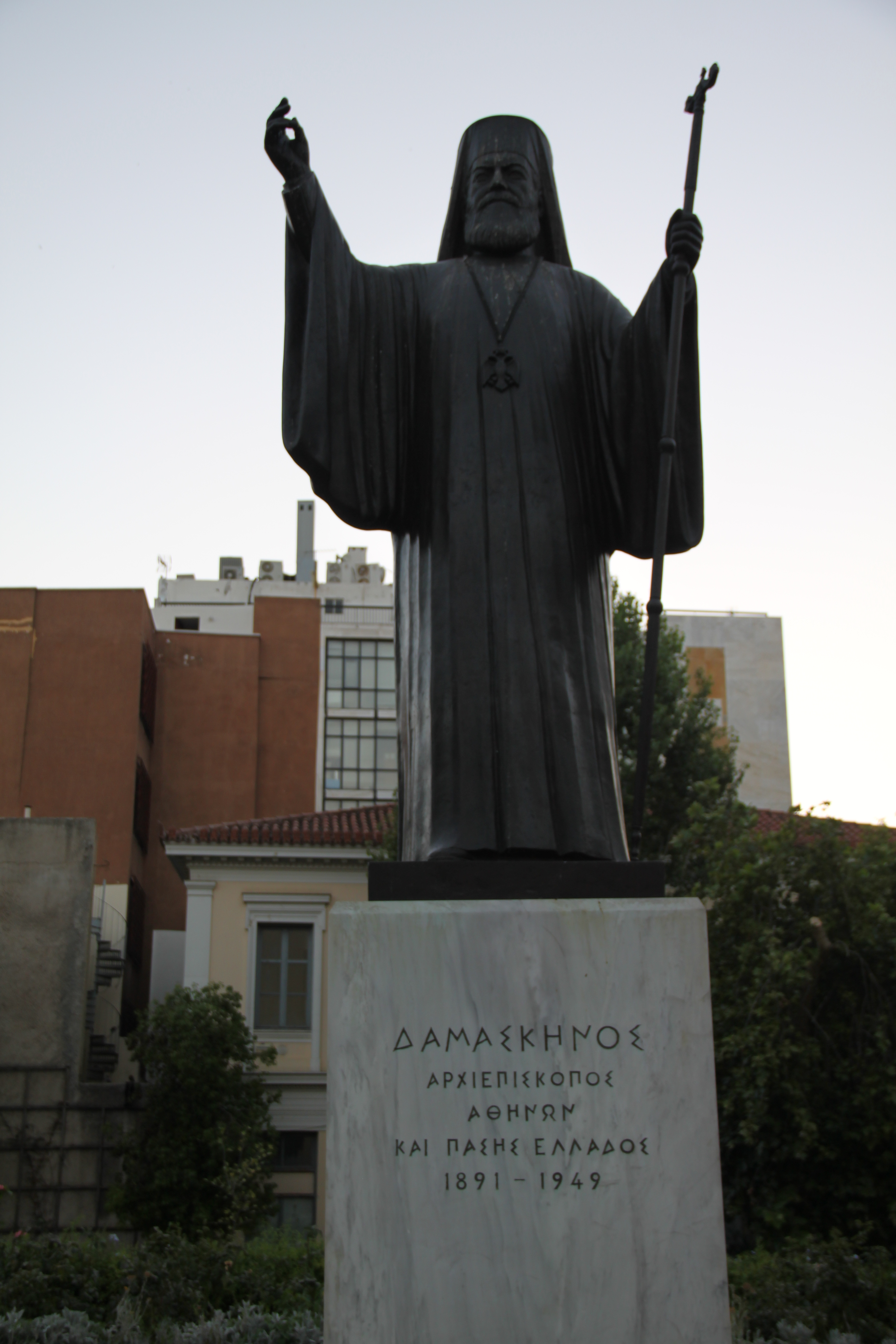
A statue in Athens

During the Dekemvriana fighting in Athens, Churchill visited the city and first met Damaskinos on Christmas Day 1944 aboard HMS Ajax. After meeting him, Churchill completely changed his view of him, writing: "It was impossible to doubt that Damaskinos greatly feared the Communists‘ involvement in Greek affairs...Generally he impressed me with a good deal of confidence". On Boxing Day 1944, Churchill again met Damaskinos and wrote, "I was already convinced that he was the outstanding figure in the Greek turmoil". The same day, Damaskinos chaired a conference aimed at a peaceful solution to the crisis, attended by members of both EAM and the government. At the conference, it was agreed that King George II would not return at once as he wanted, Damaskinos would continue as Regent, the prime minister Georgios Papandreou would resign in favor of General Nikolaos Plastiras and a ceasefire would be proclaimed to end the fighting. On 3 January 1945, Damaskinos swore in a new government headed by Plastiras, which was described as "wholly republican and moderately left-wing".

On 12 January 1945, a truce ended the fighting, and the ELAS (Note: The armed section of the left-wing EAM movement) forces were pulled out of Athens to a distance of 70 miles from the capital. However, EAM refused to release the hostages it had taken, which led Damaskinos in a press statement to state: "I deeply regret that during the negotiations for a truce it was not made possible to settle the question of the hostages". A conference at Varkiza to settle the conflict opened on 2 February 1945, where it was agreed on 11 February after much difficult negotiation that EAM would release its hostages and disarm in exchange for an amnesty, the end of martial law, and a promise to purge from the civil service those Greeks who had collaborated with the Germans. On 12 February 1945, the Treaty of Varkiza as the peace agreement was signed. On 14 February, Churchill visited Athens on his way home from the Yalta conference and rode in an open car with Damaskinos through the streets of Athens being loudly cheered by 40,000 Athenians.

After fighting began to die down, he relinquished his position and recalled the king formally on September 28, 1946. On 5 July 1947, Damaskinos became a founding member of the Queen's Fund (Vasiliki Pronia), a charity founded by Queen Frederica to assist with the children left homeless by the Greek Civil War. He died in Athens in 1949.

== Sources ==
- Brewer, David (2016). Greece The Decade of War, Occupation, Resistance, and Civil War. I.B. Tauris. ISBN 978-1780768540.

Eastern Orthodox Church titles
Preceded by Chrysanthus	Archbishop of Athens and All Greece; 1941–1949	Succeeded by Spyridon
Political offices
Preceded by Petros Voulgaris	Prime Minister of Greece; October 17, 1945 – November 1, 1945	Succeeded by Panagiotis Kanellopoulos
