= Makyneia =

Makyneia Μακύνεια
- Community
- Location within Greece
- Coordinates: 38°20′53″N 21°43′40″E
- Country: Greece
- Administrative region: Western Greece
- Regional unit: Aetolia-Acarnania
- Municipality: Nafpaktia
- Municipal unit: Antirrio

Population (2021)
  - Community: 548
- Time zone: UTC+2 (EET)
  - Summer (DST): UTC+3 (EEST)
- Postal code: 303 00
- Area code: 26340
- Vehicle registration: ME

Makyneia (Greek: Μακύνεια) is a seaside village and a community in Nafpaktia, Aetolia-Acarnania, Greece. The community includes the villages Agrapidokampos, Agios Polykarpos and Riza.

Makyneia is situated on the northeast coast of the Gulf of Patras, 4.5 km west of Antirrio. The Greek National Road 5 (Patras-Antirrio-Agrinio-Ioannina), which has recently been bypassed by the A5 motorway (also the E55), passes through the village.

== History ==
Settlement at Makyneia, under various names, including the ancient town of Macynia, dates back to the ancient times, may be as early as the Homeric age. It was a town of western Locris and later Aetolia. Until 1980, the settlement was known as Kato Mammako (Κάτω Μαμμάκω).

=== Historical population ===
Census	Village	Community
2001	280	464
2011	377	563
2021	366	548
