= Pyllini =

Pyllini Πυλλήνη
- Municipal unit
- Location within the regional unit

- Location within Greece
- Coordinates: 38°32′N 21°49′E
- Country: Greece
- Administrative region: West Greece
- Regional unit: Aetolia-Acarnania
- Municipality: Nafpaktia

Area
  - Municipal unit: 124.0 km^{2} (47.9 sq mi)

Population (2021)
  - Municipal unit: 676
  - Municipal unit density: 5.45/km^{2} (14.1/sq mi)
- Time zone: UTC+2 (EET)
  - Summer (DST): UTC+3 (EEST)

Pyllini (Greek: Πυλλήνη or Πυλήνη) is a former municipality in Aetolia-Acarnania, West Greece, Greece. Since the 2011 local government reform it is part of the municipality Nafpaktia, of which it is a municipal unit. The municipal unit has an area of 123.966 km^{2}. Population 676 (2021). The seat of the municipality was in Simos.

== Subdivisions ==
The municipal unit Pyllini is subdivided into the following communities (constituent villages in brackets):

- Famila (Platanias, Sykea, Famila)
- Anthofyto (Anthofyto, Leptokarya)
- Gavros (Gavros, Koutsogiannaiika)
- Dorvitsa
- Eleftheriani
- Milea
- Palaiopyrgos (Palaiopyrgos, Perivolia)
- Pokista
- Simos (Simos, Kampos, Palaiochori)
- Stranoma (Stranoma, Ano Kampos, Kato Kampos, Loutra Stachtis)
- Stylia (Stylia, Agia Tiada)
