= Dorvitsa =

Dorvitsa Δορβιτσά
- Community
- Location within Greece
- Coordinates: 38°33′22″N 21°47′38″E
- Country: Greece
- Administrative region: Western Greece
- Regional unit: Aetolia-Acarnania
- Municipality: Nafpaktia
- Municipal unit: Pyllini

Population (2021)
  - Community: 24
- Time zone: UTC+2 (EET)
  - Summer (DST): UTC+3 (EEST)

Dorvitsa (Greek: Δορβιτσά, also Δορβιτσιά - Dorvitsia) is a village in Aetolia-Acarnania, Greece. It is part of the municipal unit Pyllini within the municipality of Nafpaktia.
