= Panagia Panaxiotissa Church =

- Ναός Παναγίας Παναξιώτισσας
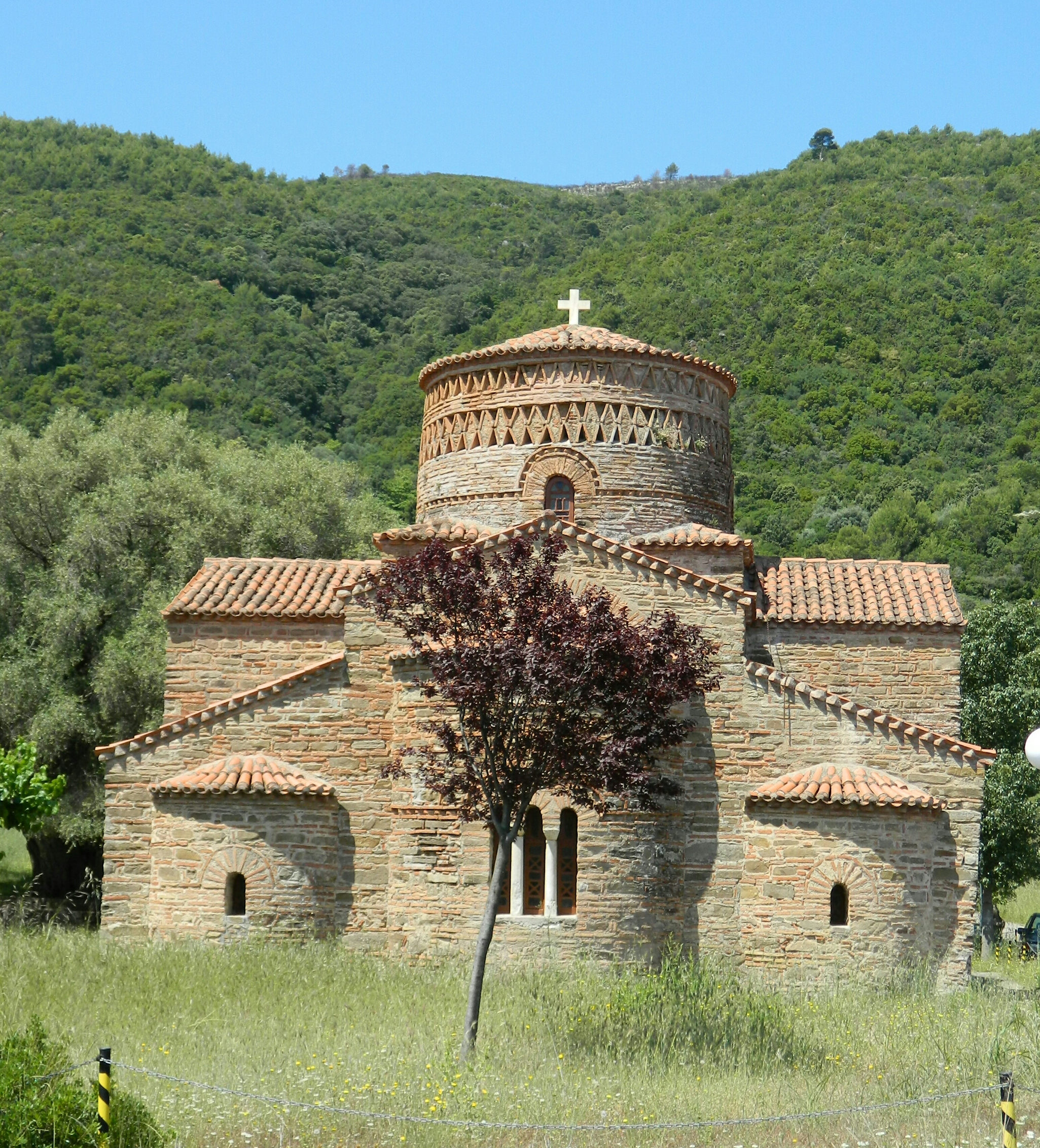

- Location within Greece
- 38°23′53″N 21°37′34″E
- Location: Gavrolimni, Aetolia-Acarnania
- Country: Greece
- Language: Greek
- Denomination: Greek Orthodox

History
- Status: Open

Architecture
- Completed: 10th century

Administration
- Metropolis: Metropolis of Nafpaktos and Agios Vlasios

The Panagia Panaxiotissa Church (Greek: Ναός Παναγίας Παναξιώτισσας) is located approximately 2 kilometers outside the village of Aetolia-Acarnania Trikorfo and is one of the most important attractions of the area.

It is the catholicon of a Byzantine monastery. The origin of the nickname "Panaxiotissa", which is probably unique in the Orthodox area, is not clear. It is interpreted by many as "She who deserved everything", while others believe that it is due to a paraphrase of the toponym of the location of the church (Panaktzi - Panaktziotissa - Panaxiotissa).

The cultural association of the village "Progressive Landscape Association of Gavrolimni Panagia Panaxiotissa" takes its name from the church.

== History ==
The well-known Greek archaeologist Anastasios Orlandos, studying the morphological elements of the temple, places its construction in the second half of the 10th century. In a more recent investigation in the surrounding area of the temple, 13 sculpted members were recorded, dating back chronologically to the Early Christian period, apparently indicating the existence of an Early Christian Basilica at the site. It seems, therefore, that the Middle Byzantine monument was built on the ruins of a pre-existing early Christian basilica.

== Architecture ==
The church of Panaxiotissa is a typical example of the architectural type of the cruciform inscribed with a dome. In the eastern part there are three semicircular arches and in the western narthex, on each side of which there are entrances leading to the inner space. The cross is clearly visible on the roof, in the center of which rises the elaborate and truly impressive brick dome. Internally the temple is covered with arches. The temple is built with limestone, mortar and bricks. From what can be seen in its original form, the interior of the temple was adorned with elaborate hagiographies, of which only one survives today.

In the vicinity of the church, one can also find the ruins of various buildings, which probably belong to the functional areas of the former monastery, as well as the now-ruined olive mill of the village, which is located in close proximity to the church and which operated approximately until the decade of 1960.
