= Molykreio =

Molykreio Μολύκρειο
- Community
- Location within Greece
- Coordinates: 38.3592°N 21.7513°E
- Country: Greece
- Administrative region: Western Greece
- Regional unit: Aetolia-Acarnania
- Municipality: Nafpaktia
- Municipal unit: Antirrio

Population (2021)
  - Community: 968
- Time zone: UTC+2 (EET)
  - Summer (DST): UTC+3 (EEST)
- Postal code: 300 20
- Area code: 26340
- Vehicle registration: ME

Molykreio (Greek: Μολύκρειο) is a village and a community in Nafpaktia, Aetolia-Acarnania, Greece. The community includes the villages Ano Platanitis, Fragkaiika and Platanitis.

The village is about 4 km north of Antirrio and the Rio–Antirrio bridge, and 8 km southwest of Nafpaktos.

== History ==
The village Molykreio, which was named Moui Agiou Georgiou before 1919, became part of the municipality of Antirrio in 1989. In 2011, it became part of the municipality of Nafpaktia.

=== Historical population ===
Census	Village	Community
2001	229	708
2011	186	959
2021	161	968
