= Chrysanthus of Athens =

Archbishop of Athens and all Greece from 1938 to 1941

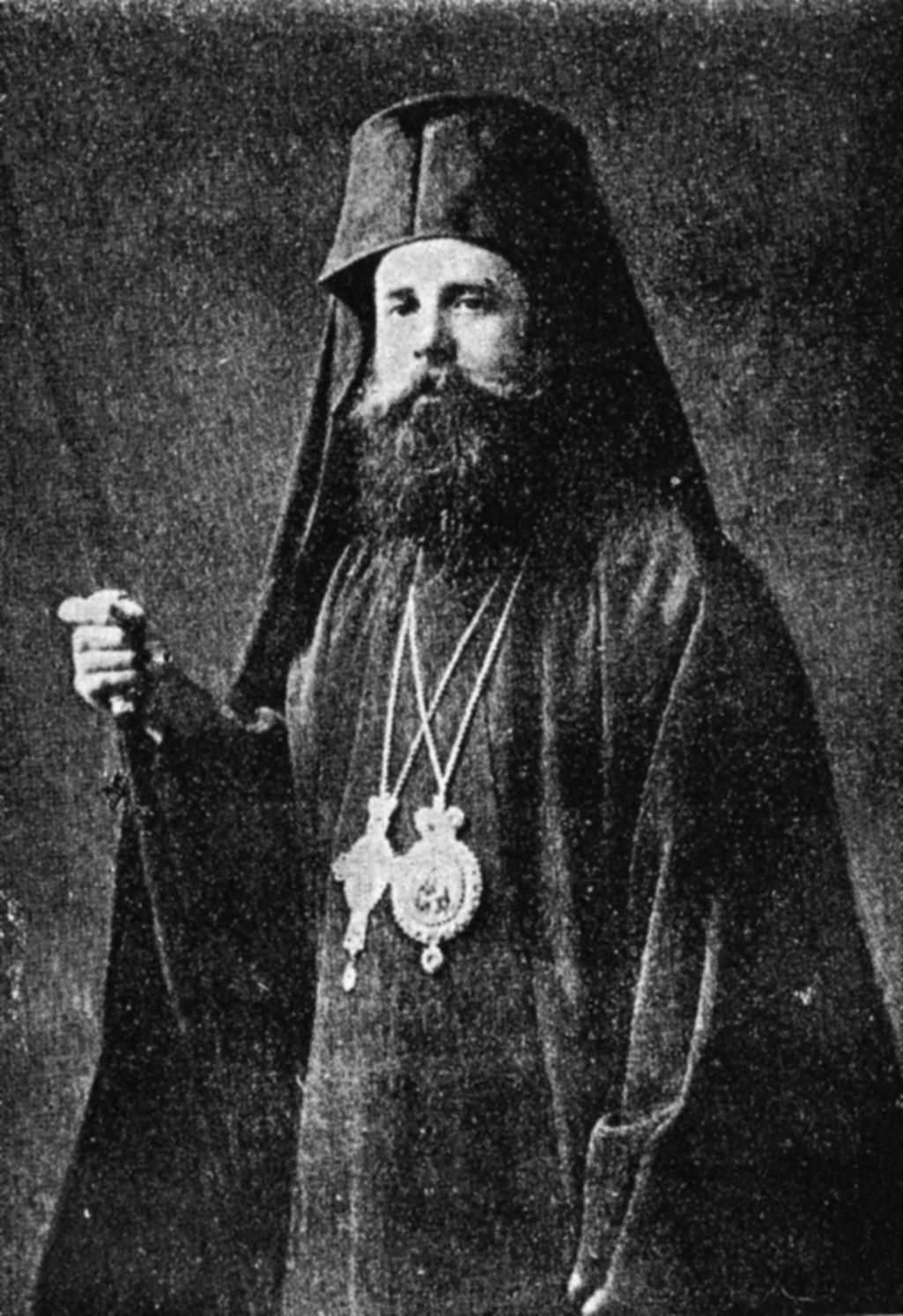
Archbishop Chrysanthus

Archbishop Chrysanthus of Athens (Greek: Αρχιεπίσκοπος Χρύσανθος; 1881 – 28 September 1949), born Charilaos Filippidis (Χαρίλαος Φιλιππίδης), was the Archbishop of Athens and all Greece between 1938 and 1941.

He was born in 1881 in Gratini, Thrace, then part of the Ottoman Empire. In 1903 he became a deacon and began his service in the Metropolis of Trebizond (modern day Trabzon) as a teacher at the Secondary School of the city, where he taught religious classes. He studied theology at the school of Halki then transferred to Lausanne in Switzerland and then to Leipzig in Germany. In 1913 he became the Metropolitan of Trebizond. The events of the First World War greatly impacted his life. In April 1916 – just ahead of the Russian invasion – he was handed control of the city by the local Ottoman administration. The Russians kept him as governor, even though he helped the local Turkish population return to the city and re-establish their institutions – to their dismay. During the war he grew in favour of an independent Pontus, which would protect its different ethnic groups. At the 1919 Paris Peace Conference he proposed the creation of the Republic of Pontus. For this he was condemned to death by the Turkish nationalist forces in 1920. He could not return to his post in Trabzon.

He became archbishop of Athens in 1938 and held the post until he resigned in the aftermath of the German invasion of Greece, after refusing to swear-in the collaborationist government of Georgios Tsolakoglou. He was succeeded by Damaskinos. He died on 28 September 1949 in Athens.
