= Chalcis (Elis) =

Chalcis or Chalkis (Ancient Greek: Χαλκίς) was a town of ancient Elis. Strabo locates it in an area of the region of Triphylia called Macistia, near a river also called Chalcis, a spring called Cruni (currently called Tavla) and not far from the city of Samicum. Both Cruni and Chalcis are named by Homer in the Odyssey, and both are also cited in the Homeric Hymn to Apollo.
