= Chalcis (Aeolis) =

Chalcis (Ancient Greek: Χαλκίς) was a town of ancient Aeolis, placed by Stephanus of Byzantium across from Lesbos. Bronze coins dated to the fourth century BCE inscribed «ΧΑ» are attributed to the town.

Its site is unlocated; however, it has been suggested that it could be located on the Turkish island of Çiplak Ada, located among an archipelago of numerous islands between Lesbos and Asia Minor. Herodotus knew this archipelago as that of the "Hundred Islands" (Ancient Greek: Ἑκατόννησοι, romanized: Hekatonesoi) and mentions that there were Aeolian cities but he does not mention the names of any of them.
