= Archytas of Mytilene =

Ancient Greek musician

Archytas (Ancient Greek: Ἀρχύτας) of Mytilene was a celebrated musician of ancient Greece. In his "Life of Archytas", Diogenes Laërtius says that there were four, perhaps five men of this name; Archytas of Tarentum, a polymath and disciple of Pythagoras, was the main subject of the biography, but Diogenes mentions Archytas of Mytilene second, and relates an anecdote about the musician: that once when criticized for speaking too softly, he replied, "my instrument speaks for me".

In the Deipnosophistae, Athenaeus of Naucratis mentions that Archytas wrote an essay on flute playing, Περὶ Αὐλῶν (Peri Aulon, "about flutes"); but here the musician seems to be identified with Archytas of Tarentum. Athenaeus says that Archytas was a flute player, like many Pythagoreans. Whether Peri Aulon is the work of the musician or the philosopher is uncertain.

== Bibliography ==
- Laërtius, Diogenes. "Pythagoreans: Archytas" . Lives of the Eminent Philosophers. Vol. 2:8. Translated by Hicks, Robert Drew (Two volume ed.). Loeb Classical Library.
- Athenaeus, Deipnosophistae.
- Dictionary of Greek and Roman Biography and Mythology, William Smith, ed., Little, Brown and Company, Boston (1849).
- August Pauly, Georg Wissowa, et alii, Realencyclopädie der Classischen Altertumswissenschaft (Scientific Encyclopedia of the Knowledge of Classical Antiquities, abbreviated RE or PW), J. B. Metzler, Stuttgart (1894–1980).
