= Varasova =

Mountain in Greece

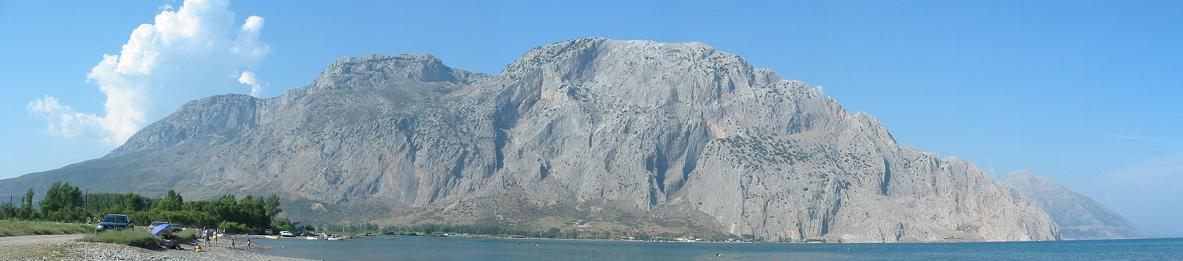
- Varasova from Kryoneri

Highest point
- Elevation: 917 m (3,009 ft)
- Coordinates: 38°21′49″N 21°35′31″E

Naming
- Pronunciation: Greek: [vaˈrasova]

Geography
- Location within Greece
- Location: southern Aetolia-Acarnania

Varasova (Greek: Βαράσοβα) is a limestone mountain in the southern part of Aetolia-Acarnania in western Greece. It was known as Chalcis (Ancient Greek: Χαλκίς) in antiquity, and there was an ancient Aetolian town at its foot named Chalcis, Hypochalcis or Chalceia (hence the name of the current administrative unit Chalkeia). It rises steeply from the coast of the Gulf of Patras to 917 m elevation. It is situated just east of the mouth of the river Evinos, 3 km east of Galatas, 14 km east of Missolonghi and 18 km northwest of Patras. 8 km to its east is the mountain Klokova. There are several rock climbing routes on the steep south and southwest faces of the Varasova.

It is referred to as the Mount Athos of Rumelia or Western Greece, due to the large number of churches and monasteries (around 72) built in the Byzantine and the Ottoman period. Several still exist today, including the 9th-18th century cave monastery of Agios Nikolaos near Kryoneri, which is only accessible by boat. It is an important natural site, notable as the only place in the world where the plant Centaurea heldreichii grows.

Local tradition tells us that the Titans endeavoured to throw this rock into the sea, so that it might form a bridge between the two coasts; but the rock proved too heavy, and was dropped where we see it today.

== Gallery ==
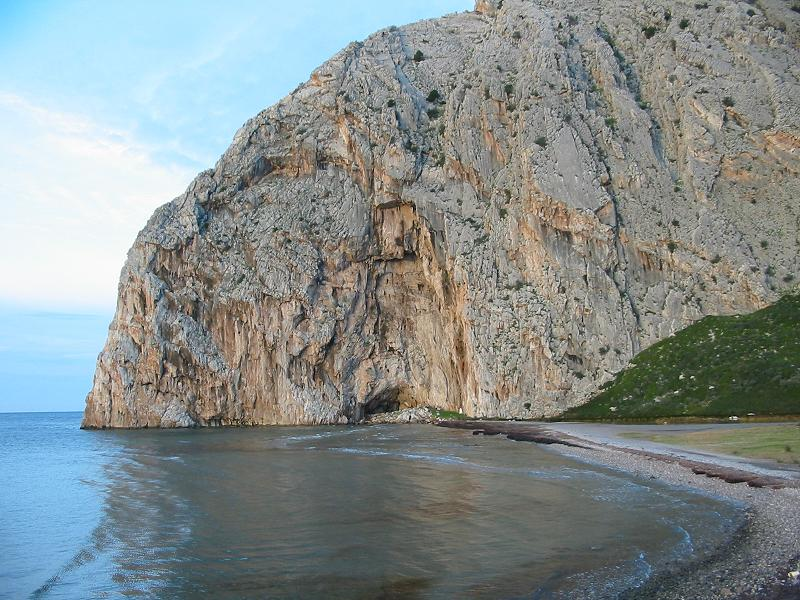
East side of Varasova, Kato Vasiliki

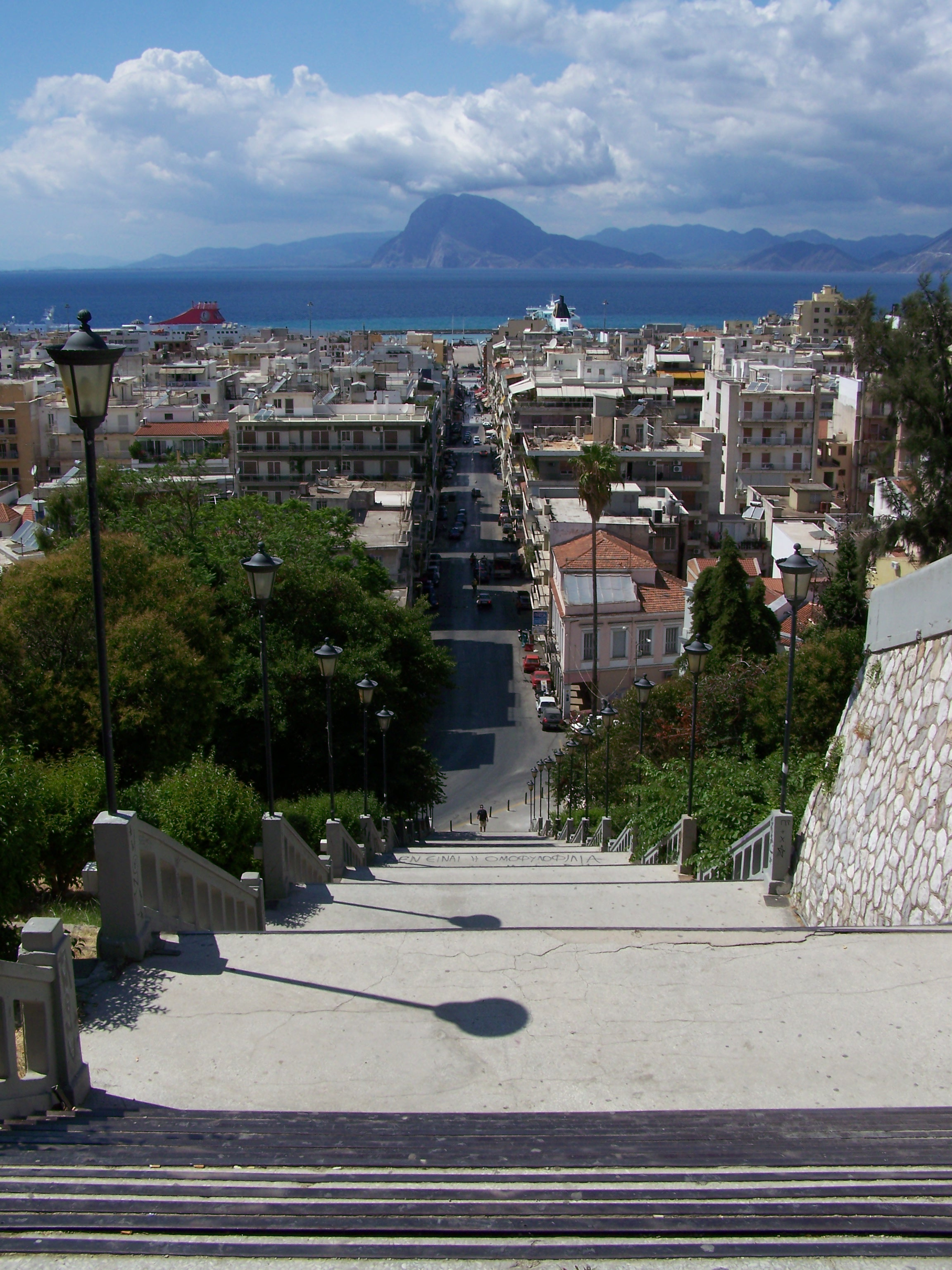
Varasova from Patras

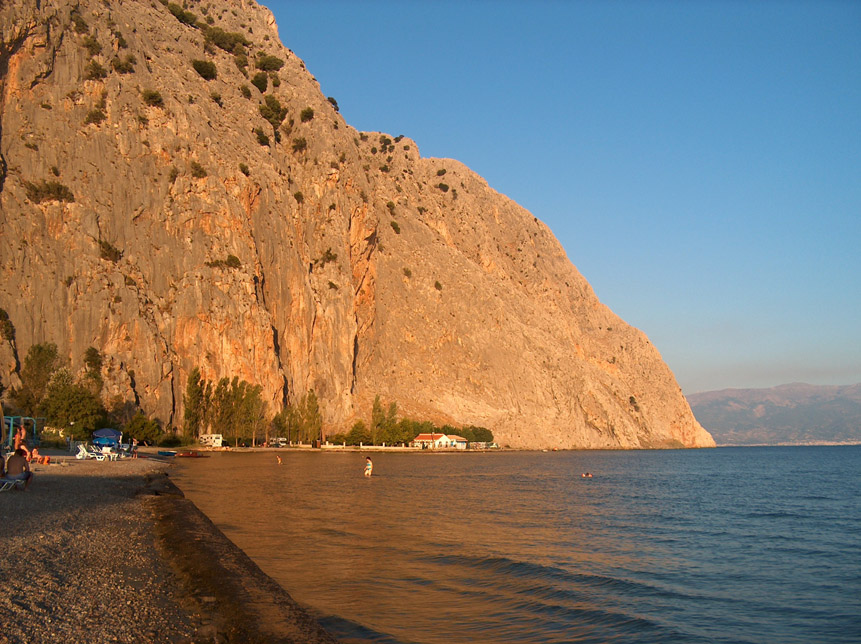
Varasova from Kryoneri

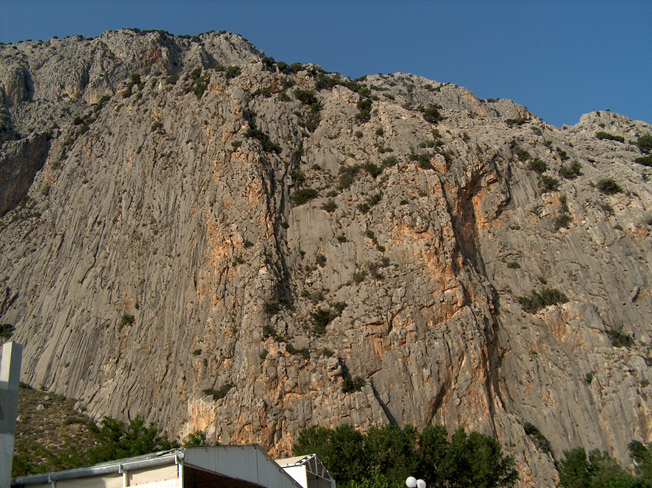
Varasova, Kryoneri

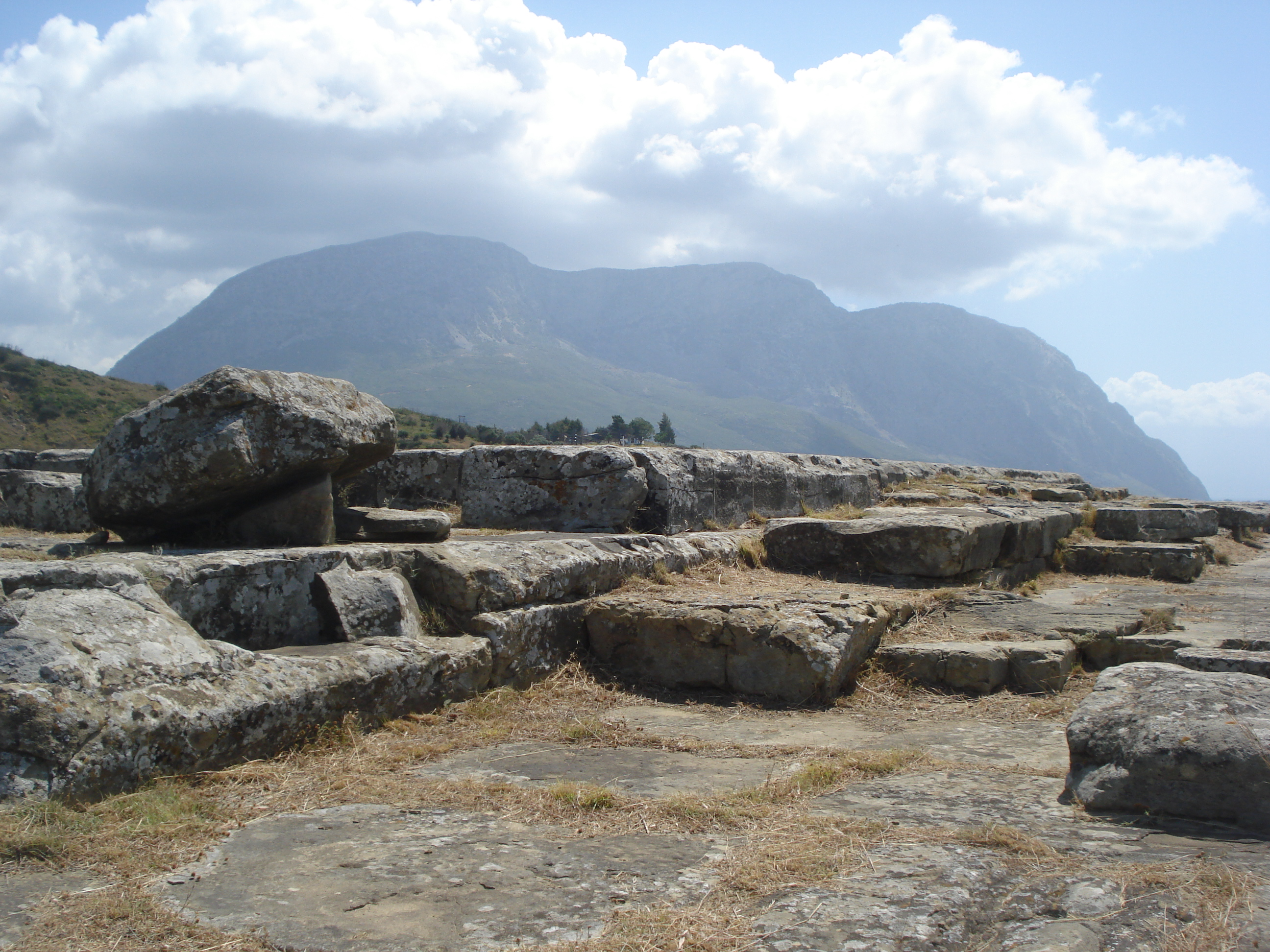
Varasova from ancient Calydon

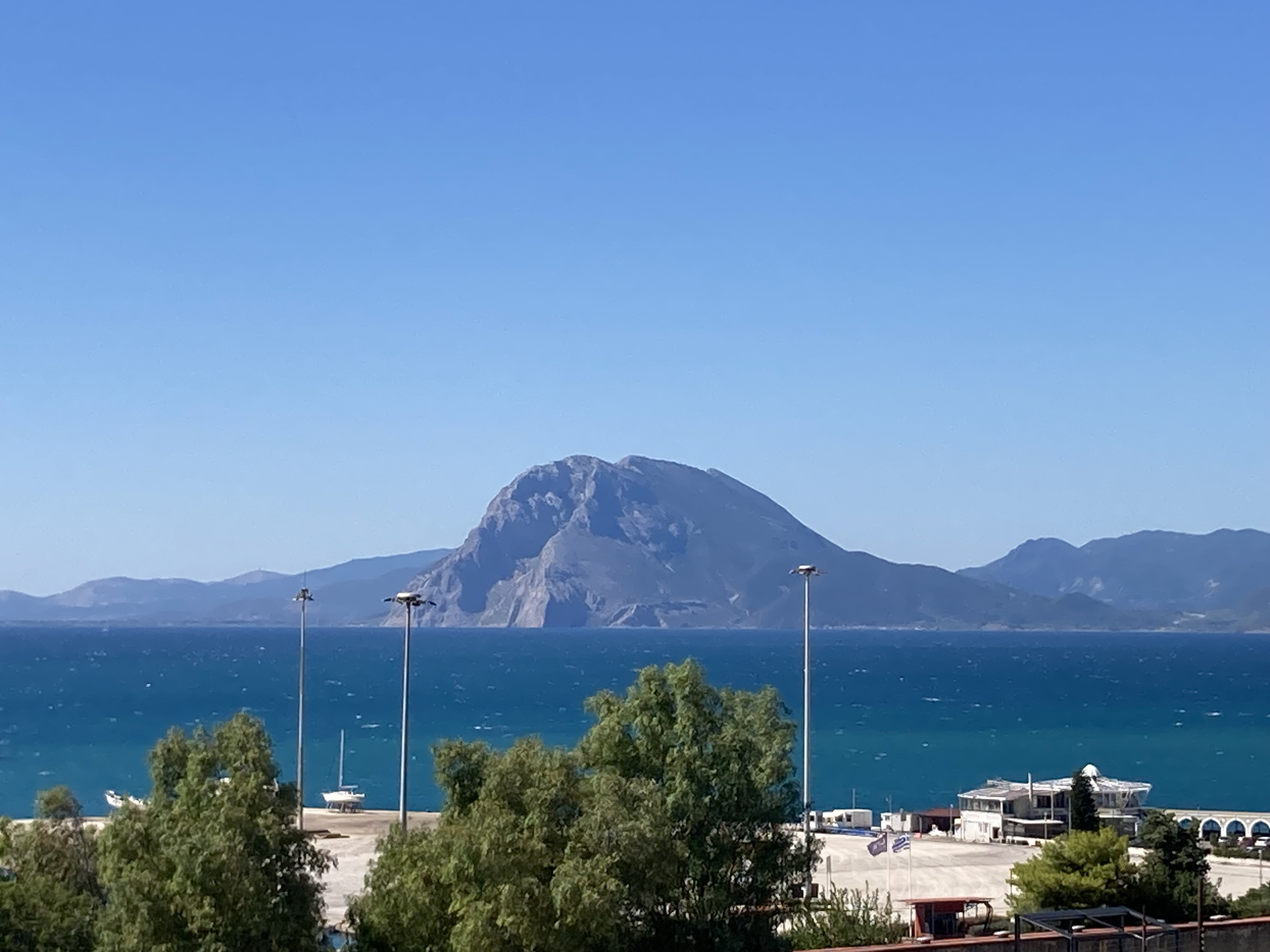
Mount Varasova very prominently viewed from Patras, Greece.

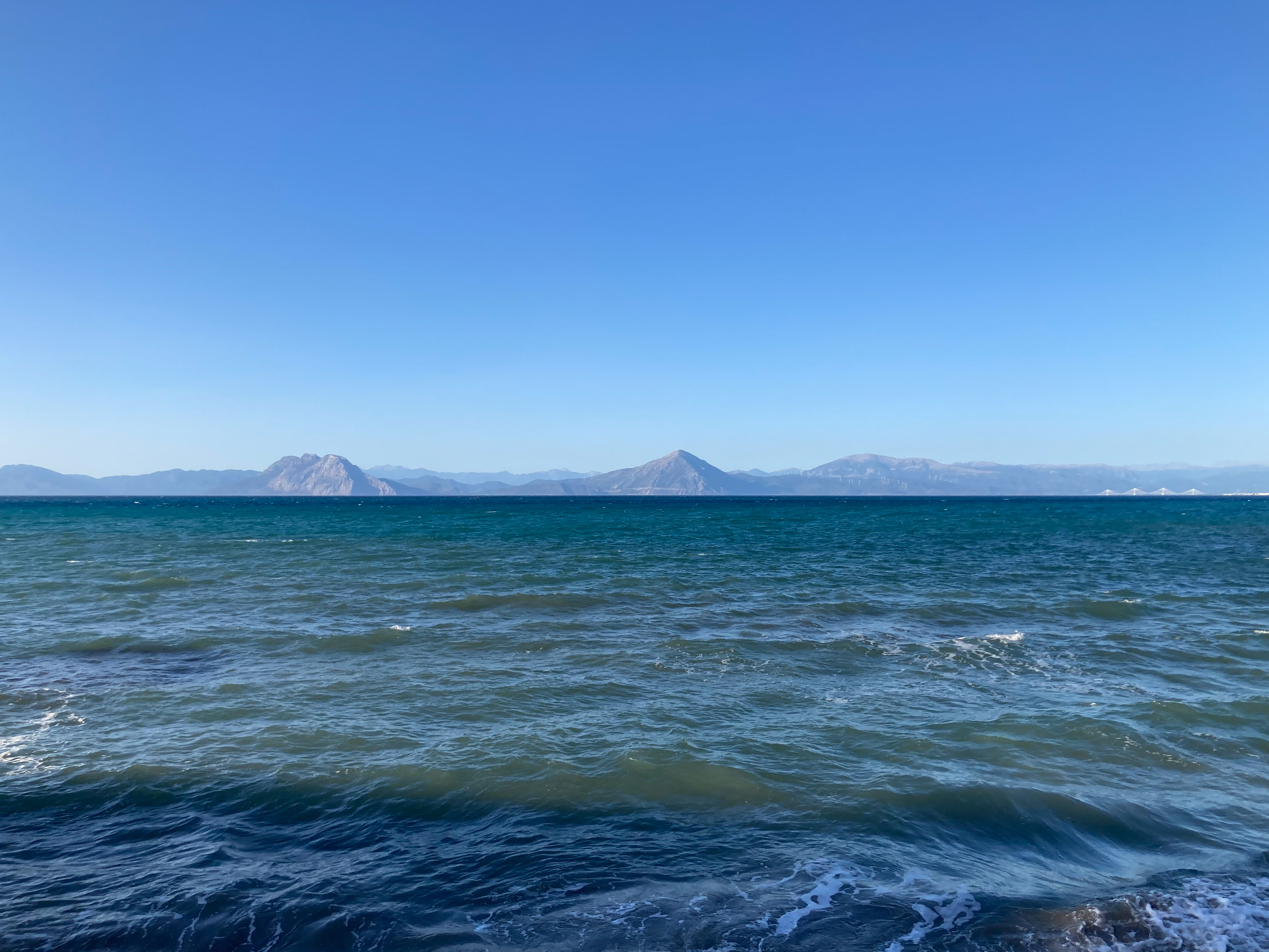
Varasova (and Klokova) viewed from Tsoukaleika.
