= Chalcis (Aetolia) =

Town of ancient Aetolia

Coordinates: 38°20′57″N 21°36′50″E

Chalcis or Chalkis (Ancient Greek: Χαλκίς), also called Chalceia (Χάλκεια) and Hypochalcis (Ὑποχαλκίς), was a town of ancient Aetolia, situated upon the coast, at a short distance east of the mouth of the Evenus, and at the foot of a mountain of the same name, whence it was called Hypochalcis. Chalcis is one of the five Aetolian towns spoken of by Homer, who gives it the epithet of ἀγχίαλος (anchialos, "near the coast"), in the Catalogue of Ships in the Iliad. It continued to be mentioned in the historical period, by Thucydides, Polybius, and Strabo.

Its site is identified as near the modern Kato Vasiliki.
