= Tsoukalaiika, Achaea =

Tsoukalaiika Τσουκαλαίικα
- Community
- Location within Greece
- Coordinates: 38°9′N 21°38′E
- Country: Greece
- Administrative region: West Greece
- Regional unit: Achaea
- Municipality: Patras
- Municipal unit: Vrachnaiika

Area
  - Community: 3.68 km^{2} (1.42 sq mi)
- Elevation: 10 m (33 ft)

Population (2021)
  - Community: 493
  - Density: 134/km^{2} (347/sq mi)
- Time zone: UTC+2 (EET)
  - Summer (DST): UTC+3 (EEST)
- Postal code: 250 02
- Vehicle registration: AX

Tsoukalaiika (Greek: Τσουκαλαίικα, also: Τσουκαλέικα) is a village and a community in the municipal unit of Vrachnaiika in the northern part of Achaea, Greece. It is on the southwestern edge of the metropolitan area of Patras, on the Gulf of Patras, 13 km southwest of Patras city centre. It is located on the Greek National Road 9 (Patras - Pyrgos - Pylos) and the railway from Patras to Pyrgos.

== Historical population ==
| Year | Population |
|---|---|
| 1981 | 448 |
| 1991 | 338 |
| 2001 | 447 |
| 2011 | 393 |
| 2021 | 493 |

== Gallery ==
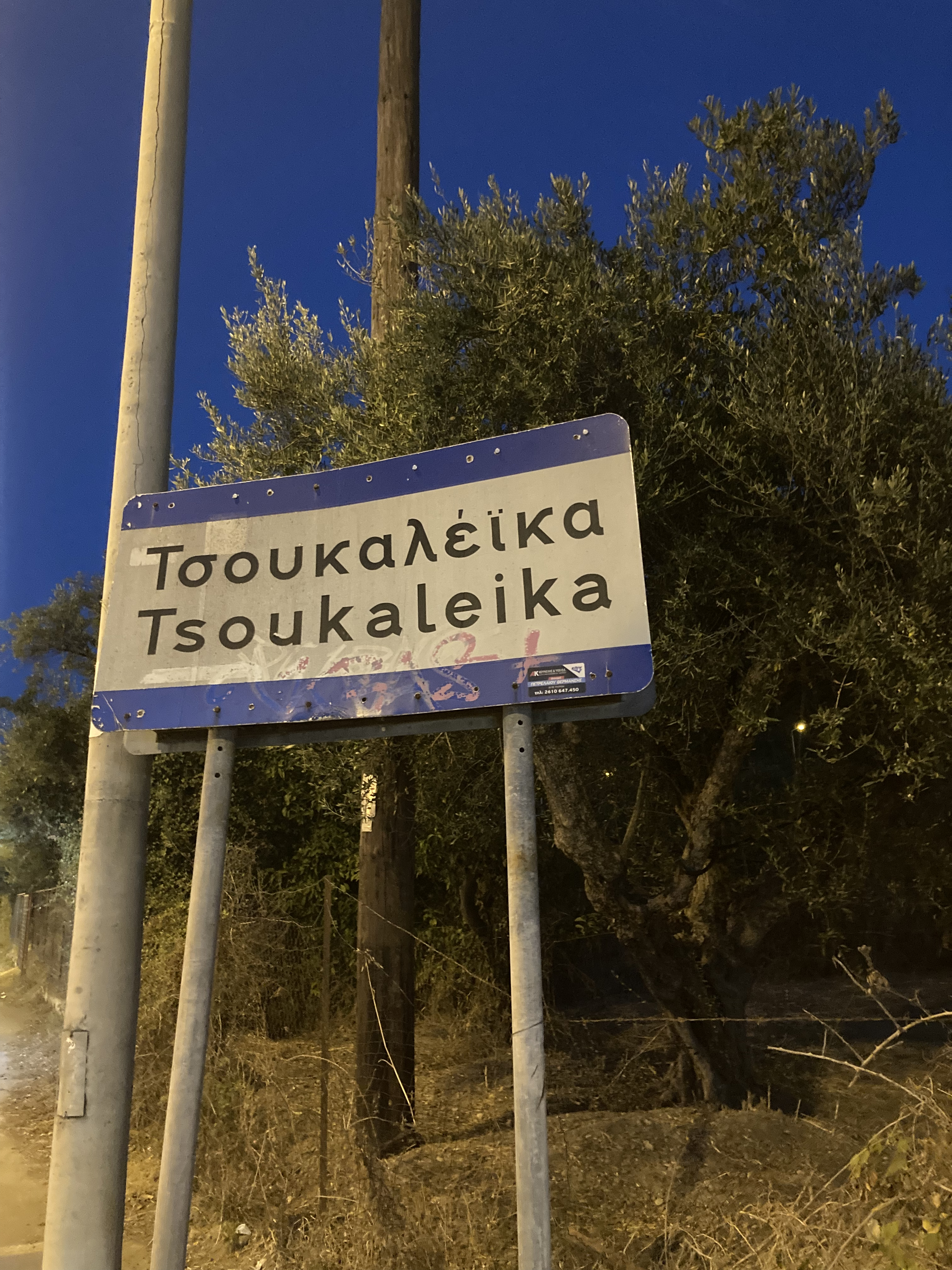
A sign showing you are entering Tsoukaleika.

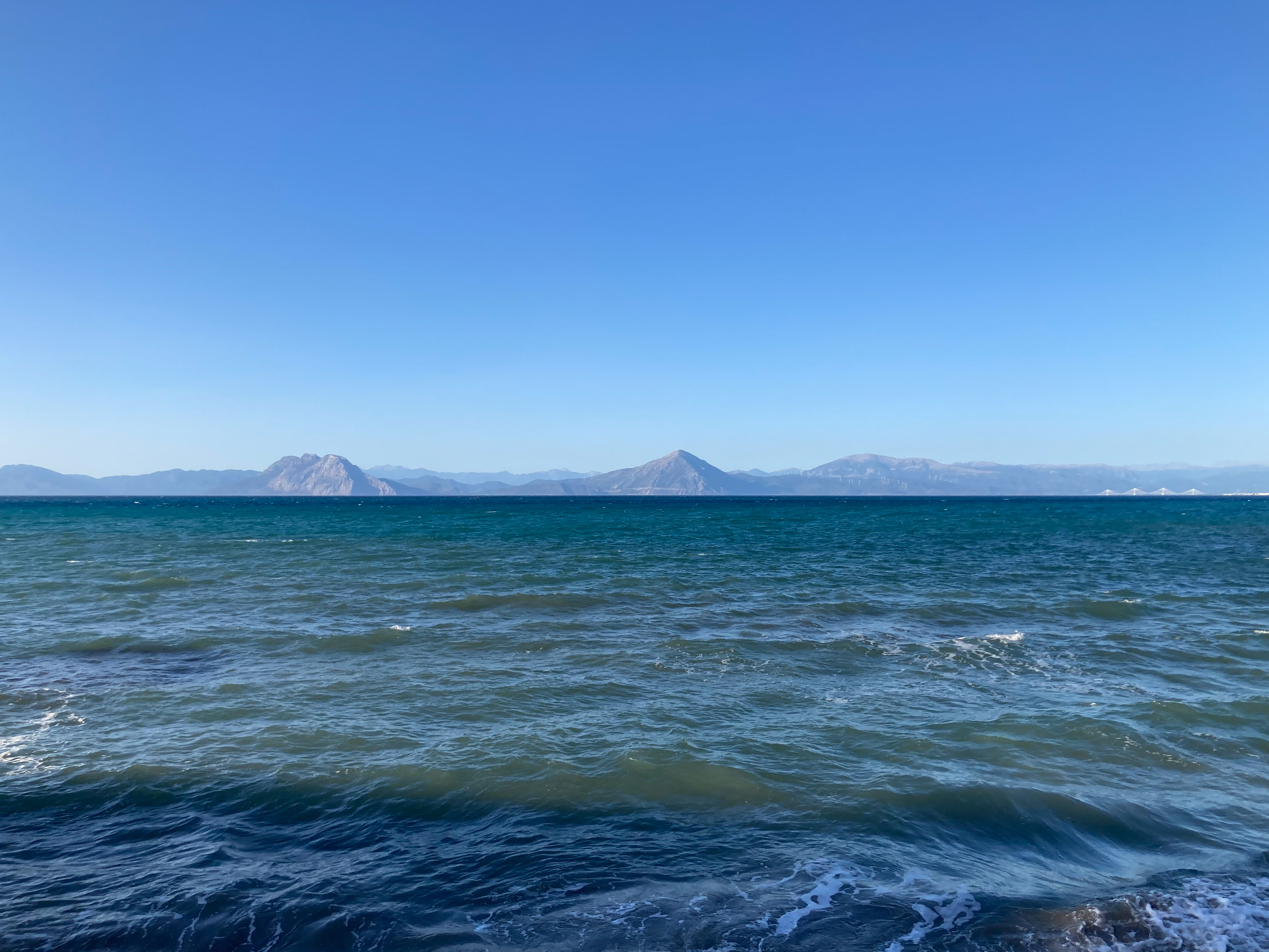
Patraic Gulf, with the Mountains Varasova, Klokova and Rigani and the Rio-Antirrio Bridge as viewed from Tsoukaleika.

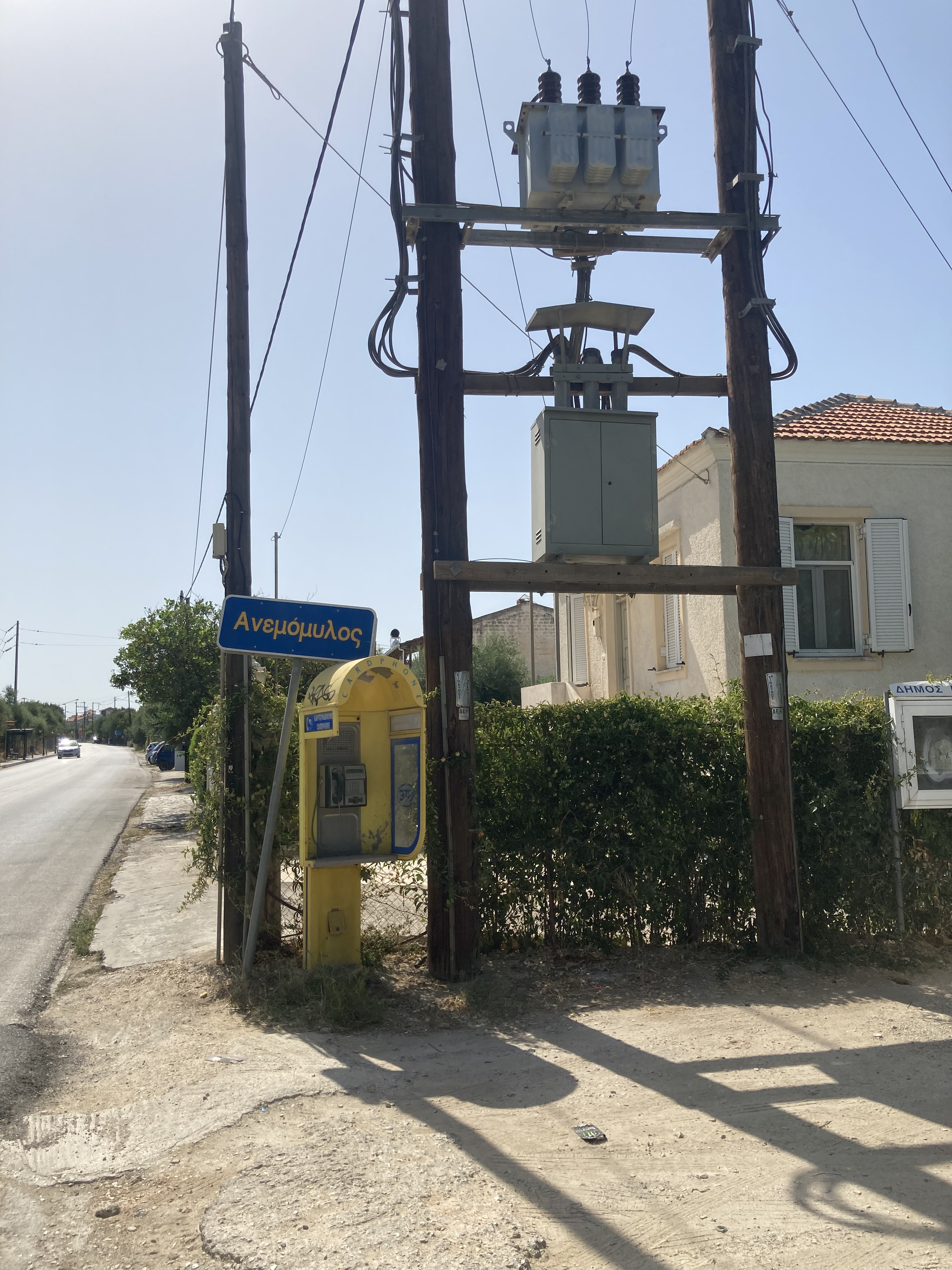
The hamlet of Anemomylos (Windmill) which has a playground.

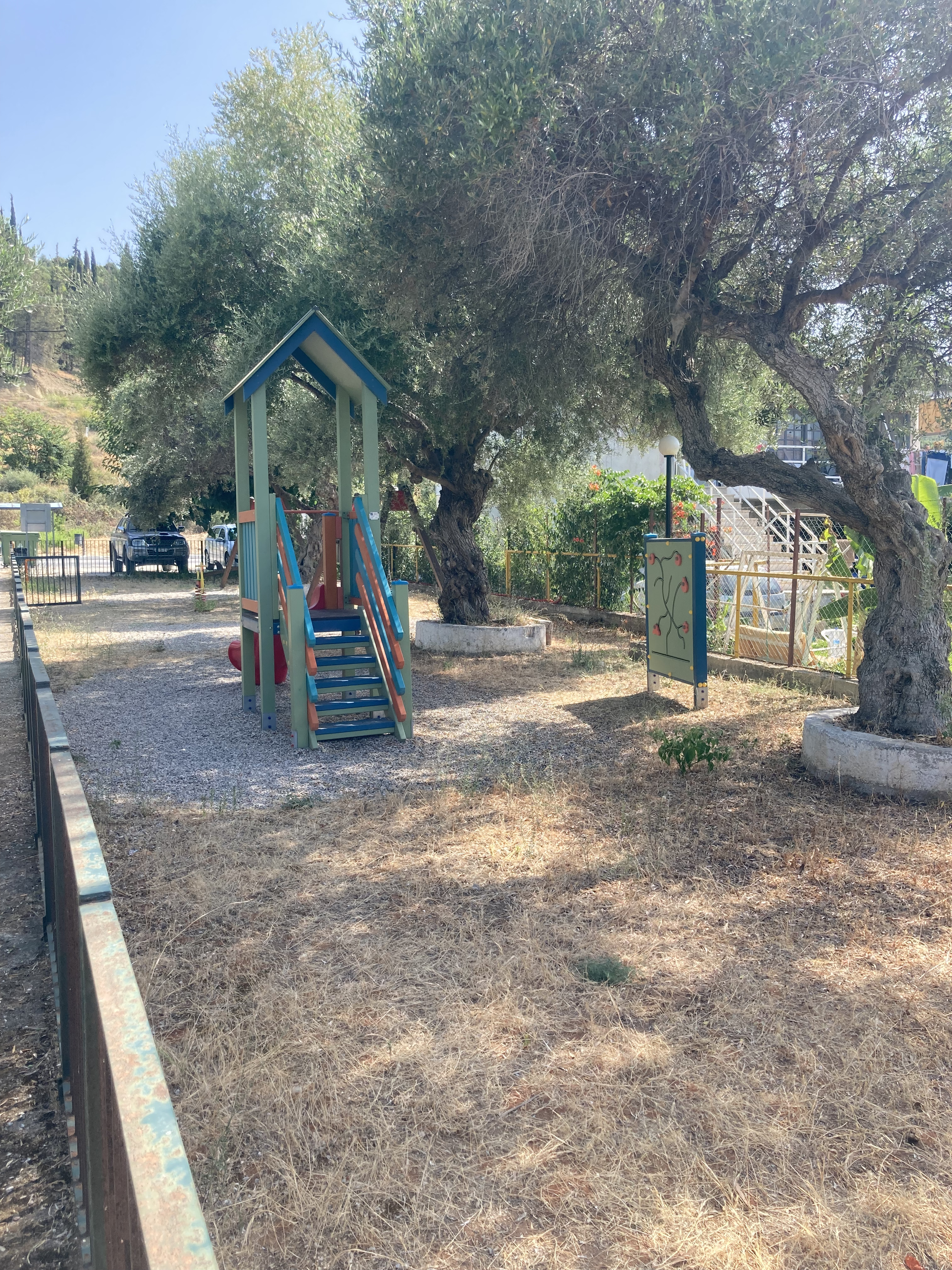
The playground at Anemomylos.

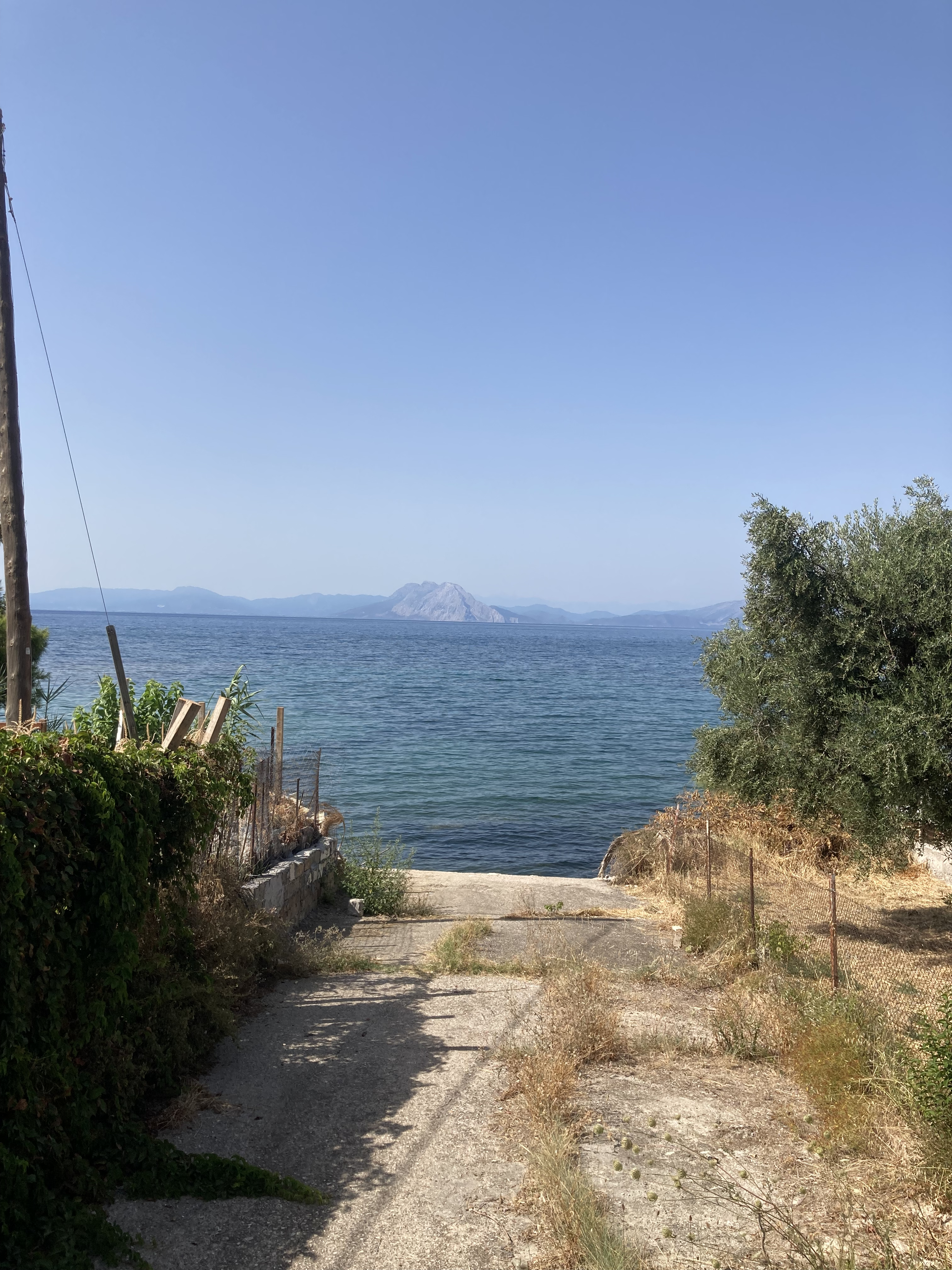
The view of Varasova and the Patraic Gulf from Anemomylos playground.

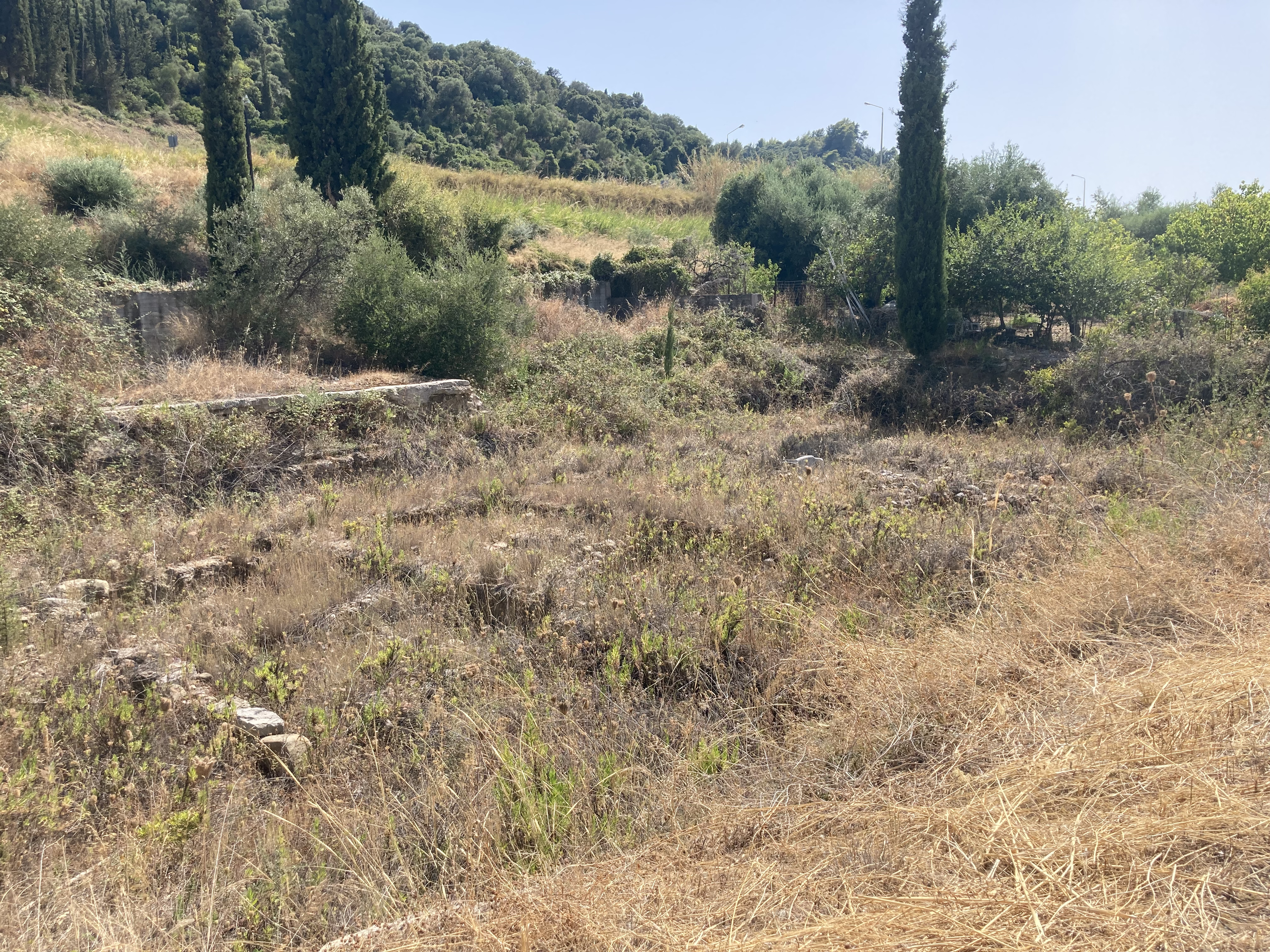
Ancient ruins of buildings near the bus stop in Tsoukaleika.

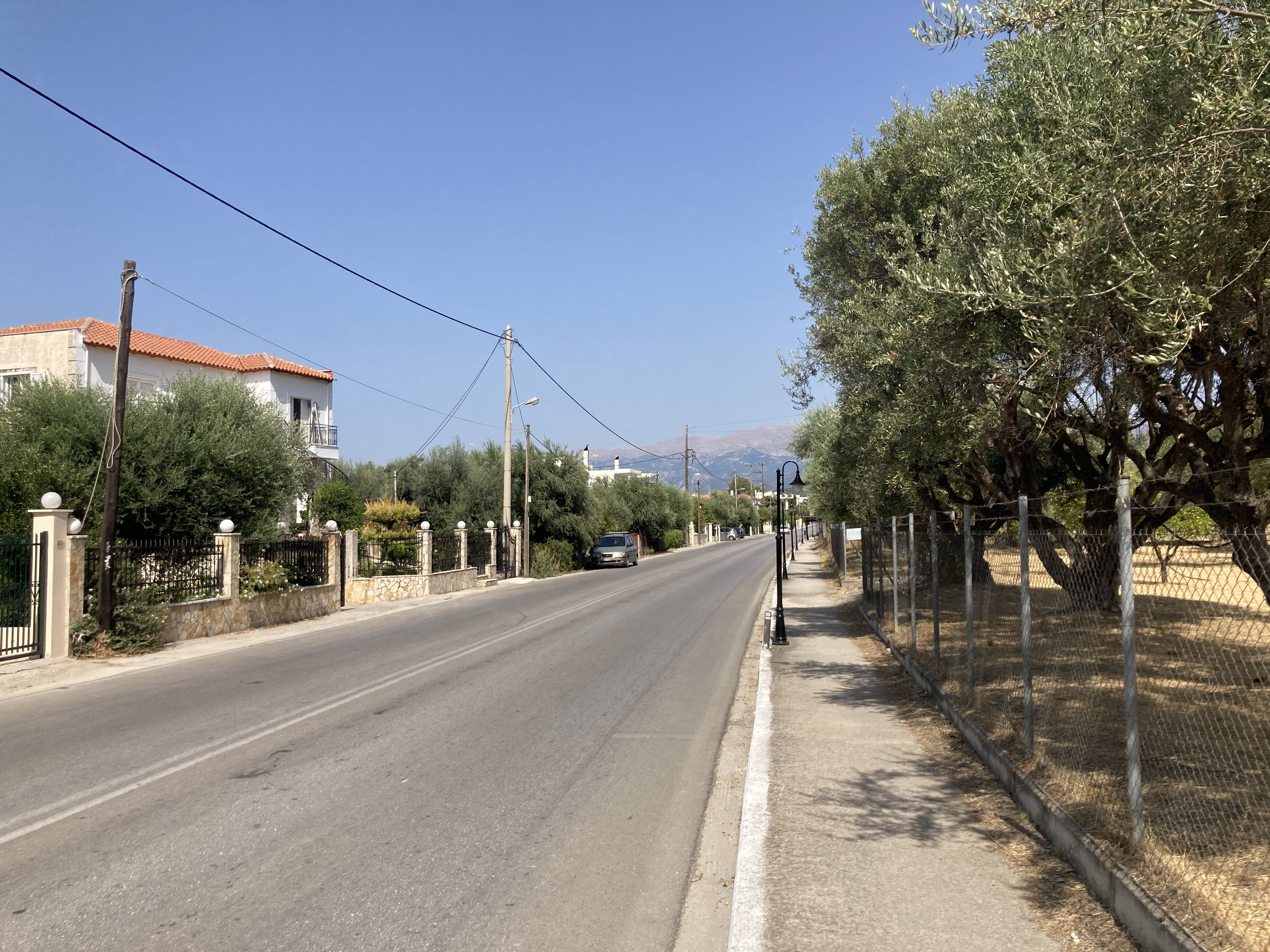
The main road in Tsoukaleika with Panachaiko in the background.

== See also ==
- List of settlements in Achaea
