= Chalkeia =

Chalkeia Χάλκεια
- Municipal unit
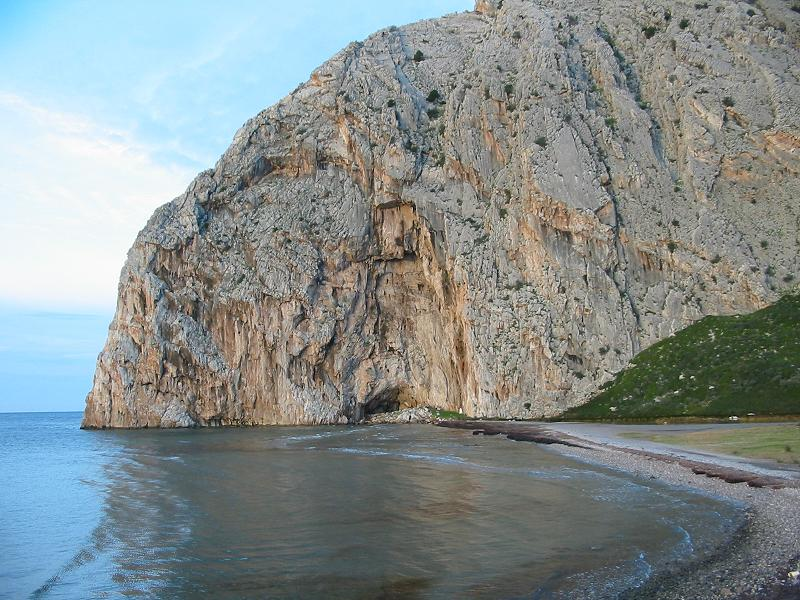
- Limnopoula, Kato Vasiliki

- Location within the regional unit

- Location within Greece
- Coordinates: 38°23′N 21°38′E
- Country: Greece
- Administrative region: West Greece
- Regional unit: Aetolia-Acarnania
- Municipality: Nafpaktia

Area
  - Municipal unit: 114.2 km^{2} (44.1 sq mi)

Population (2021)
  - Municipal unit: 2,219
  - Municipal unit density: 19.43/km^{2} (50.33/sq mi)
- Time zone: UTC+2 (EET)
  - Summer (DST): UTC+3 (EEST)
- Postal code: 300 14
- Area code: 26340

Chalkeia (Greek: Χάλκεια) is a former municipality in Aetolia-Acarnania, West Greece, Greece. Since the 2011 local government reform it is part of the municipality Nafpaktia, of which it is a municipal unit. The municipal unit has an area of 114.189 km^{2}. Population 2,219 (2021). The seat of the municipality was in Trikorfo.

== Subdivisions ==
The municipal unit Chalkeia is subdivided into the following communities (constituent villages in brackets):

- Trikorfo
- Ano Vasiliki
- Vasiliki (Kato Vasiliki, Perama)
- Gavrolimni
- Galatas (Galatas, Kryoneri)
- Kalavrouza (Kato Kalavrouza, Kalavrouza)
- Perithori
