= Archytas of Amphissa =

Ancient Greek poet

Archytas (Ancient Greek: Ἀρχύτας) of Amphissa was a Greek poet who was probably a contemporary of Euphorion of Chalcis, about 300 BCE, since it was a matter of doubt with the ancients themselves whether the epic poem Γέρανος (Geranos) was the work of Archytas or Euphorion.

Plutarch quotes from him a hexameter verse concerning the country of the Ozolian Locrians. Two other lines, which he is said to have inserted in the poem Hermes of Eratosthenes, are preserved in the writings of Stobaeus. He seems to have been the same person whom Diogenes Laërtius calls an epigrammatist, and upon whom Bion of Smyrna wrote an epigram which he quotes.
