= Klokova =

Mountain in Greece

Klokova (Κλόκοβα)
- Taphiassos
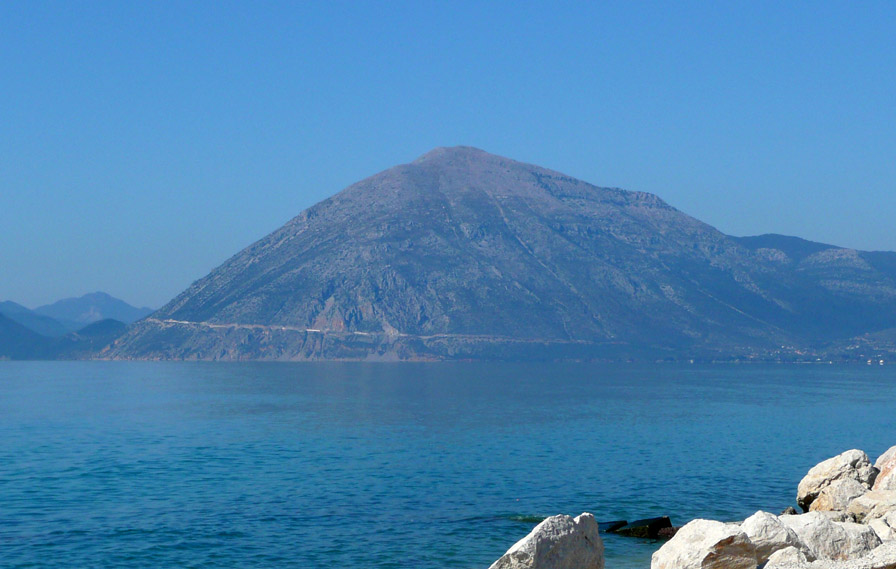
- View of Klokova from Rio in Achaea

Highest point
- Peak: Klokova
- Elevation: 1,039 m (3,409 ft)
- Coordinates: 38°21′43″N 21°40′57″E

Geography
- Location within Greece
- Country: Greece
- Regional unit: Aetolia-Acarnania

Klokova (Greek: Κλόκοβα, also known as Paliovouna (Παλιοβούνα)) is a mountain in the southeast of Aetolia-Acarnania, in western Greece. In classical antiquity, the mountain was known as Taphiassus (Ταφιασσός). Its highest point is 1,039 m.

== Geography ==
The mountain is located nearly 6 km west of Antirrio and sits on the northeast shore of the Gulf of Patras. A nearby mountain range is Arakynthos to the northwest, separated from Klokova by the river Evinos.

The National Road 5 runs along the southern foot of the mountain. This was once used for main traffic between Antirrio and Messolonghi as well as Ioannina, the traffic now carried by the A5 Ionia Odos motorway (part of the E55) running in the southern portion underneath with the Klokova Tunnel, which is 2.8 km long and was opened to traffic on 12 April 2017.

== Mythology ==
According to Greek mythology, Nessus and other centaurs were buried on the hill of Taphiassus. Nessus tried to carry Deianeira across the Evinos river, which led Hercules to kill him. The decomposition of their bodies made water flowing at the foot of the hill to be ""bleak and with blood clots...".

== Gallery ==
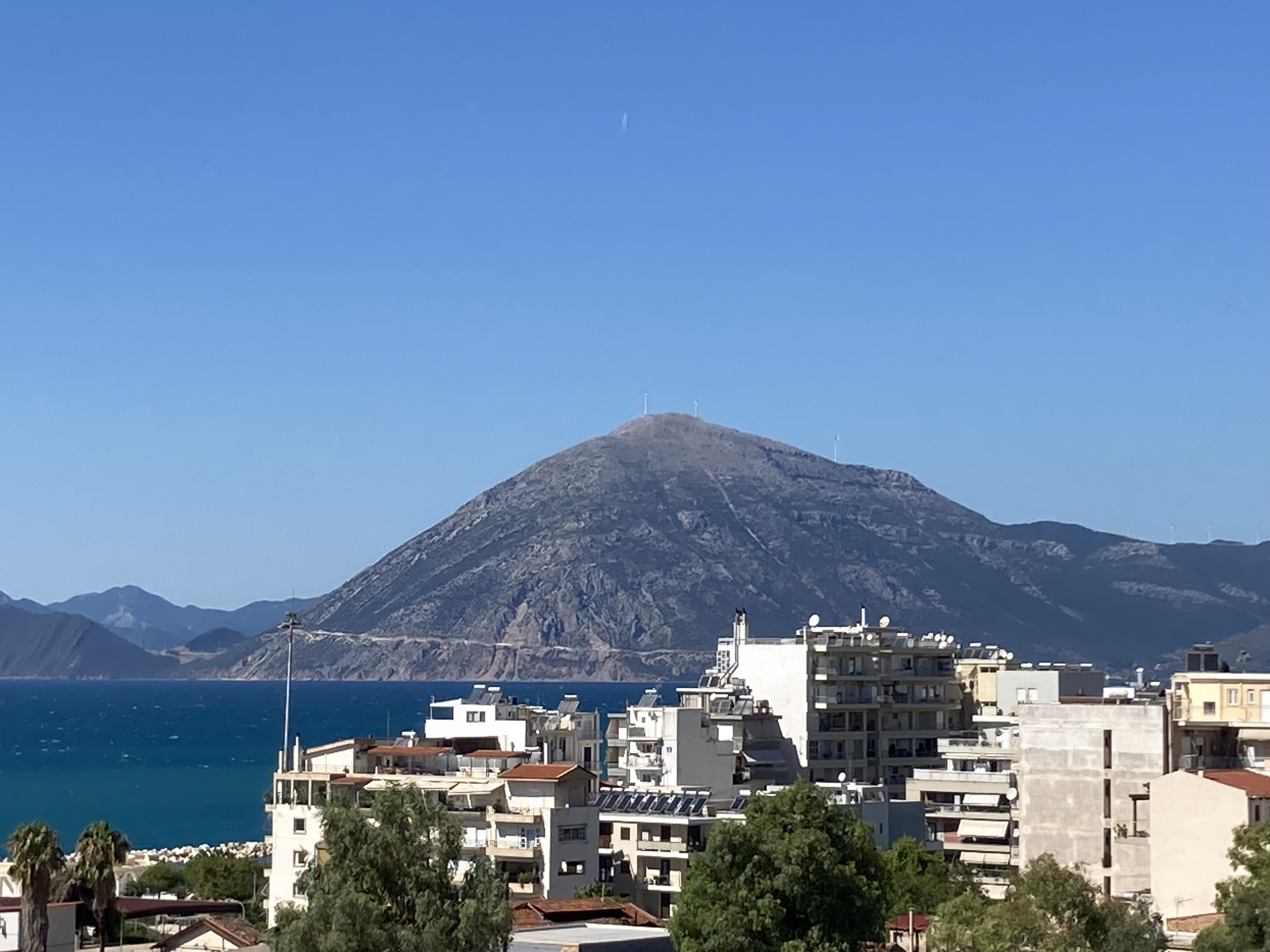
Mount Klokova viewed from Patras, Greece.

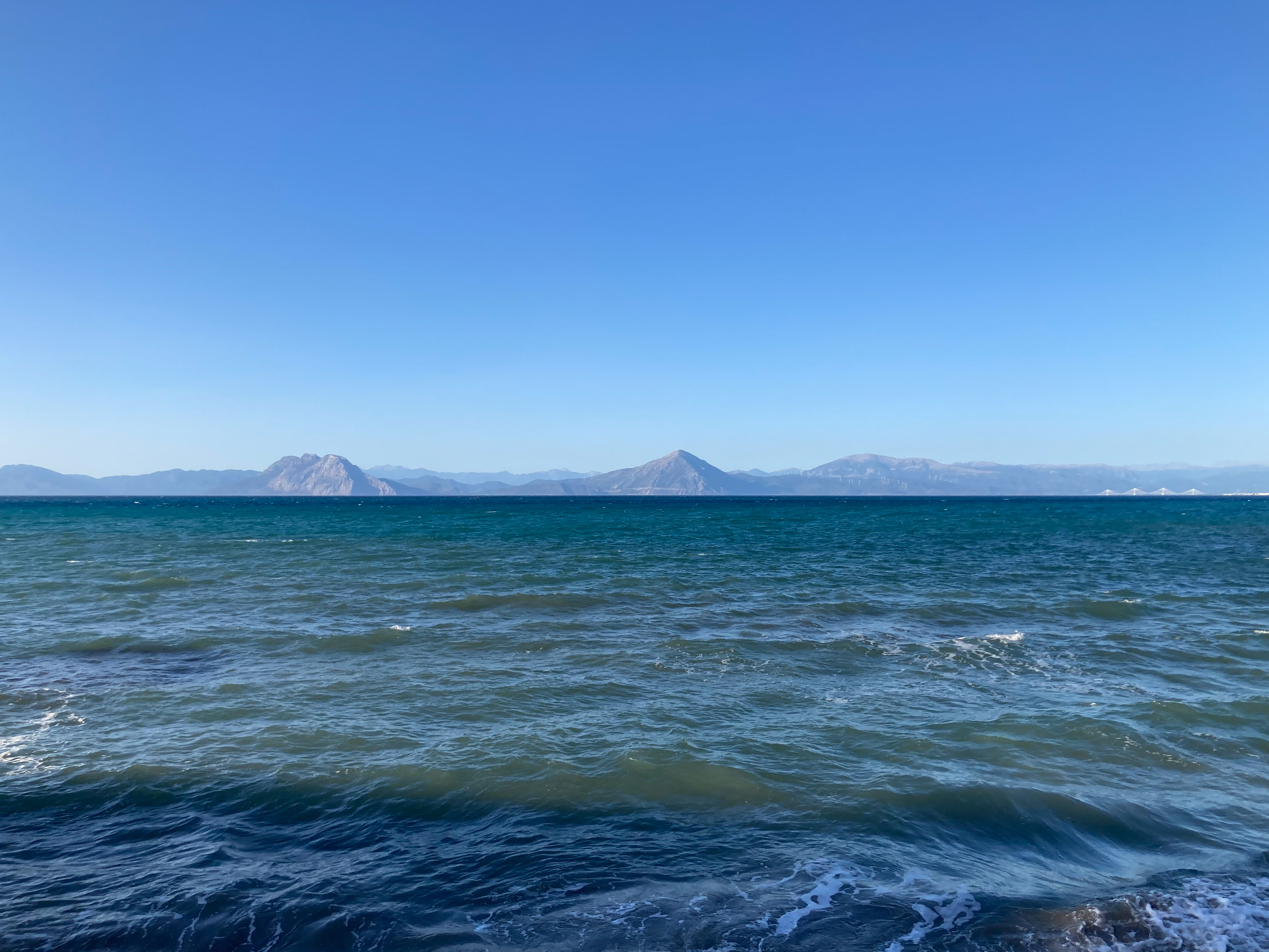
A view of several mountains, including Klokova from Tsoukaleika.

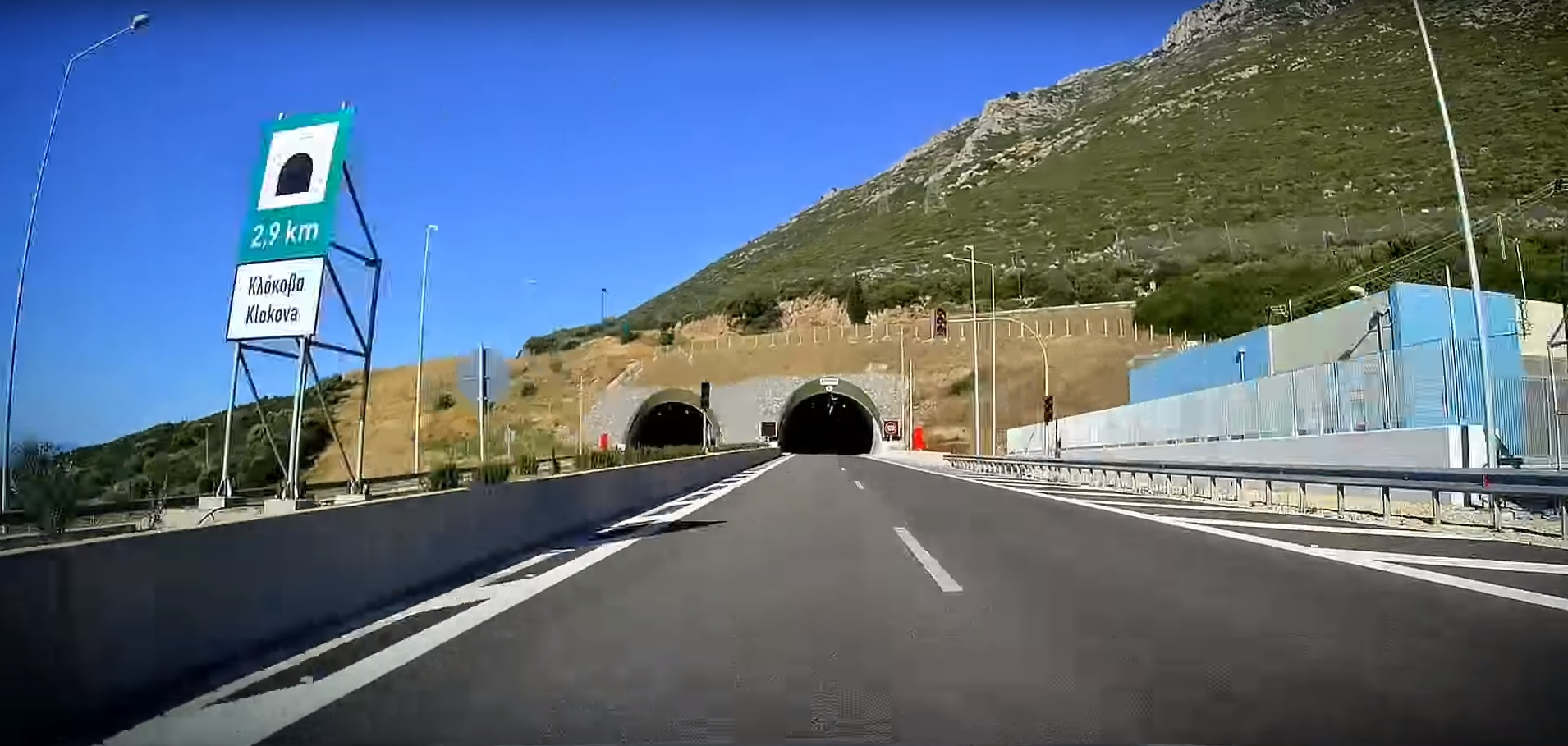
A view of the Klokova Tunnel.
