= Antirrio =

Town in Aetolia, Greece

Antirrio Αντίρριο
- Municipal unit
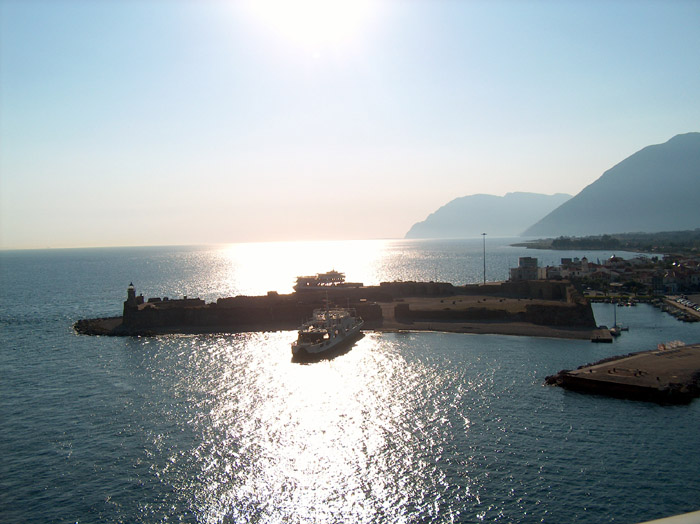
- The Castle of Antirrio

- Location within the regional unit

- Location within Greece
- Coordinates: 38°19′52″N 21°45′47″E
- Country: Greece
- Administrative region: West Greece
- Regional unit: Aetolia-Acarnania
- Municipality: Nafpaktia

Area
  - Municipal unit: 50.8 km^{2} (19.6 sq mi)
- Elevation: 5 m (16 ft)

Population (2021)
  - Municipal unit: 2,603
  - Municipal unit density: 51.2/km^{2} (133/sq mi)
  - Community: 1,087
- Time zone: UTC+2 (EET)
  - Summer (DST): UTC+3 (EEST)
- Postal code: 300 20
- Area code: 26340
- Vehicle registration: ME

Antirrio (Greek: Αντίρριο, pronounced [aˈndirio], Latin: Antirrhium) is a town and a former municipality in Aetolia-Acarnania, West Greece, Greece. Since the 2011 local government reform it is part of the municipality Nafpaktia, of which it is a municipal unit. The municipal unit has an area of 50.794 km^{2}.

It is situated on the north side of the narrow (2.4 km) Strait of Rio, which separates the Gulf of Patras in the west from the Gulf of Corinth in the east. Since August 2004 the Rio–Antirrio bridge connects northwestern Greece with the Peloponnese. The name Antirrio means "opposite Rio".

== Subdivisions ==
The municipal unit Antirrio is subdivided into the following communities (constituent villages in brackets):

- Antirrio (Antirrio, Karaoulia, Myrtia, Spartorachi)
- Makyneia (Makyneia, Agios Polykarpos, Agrapidokampos, Riza)
- Molykreio (Molykreio, Ano Platanitis, Fragkaiika)

== Historical population ==
Year	Community	Municipal unit
1981	916	-
1991	676	2,531
2001	1,100	-
2011	1,076	2,598
2021	1,087	2,603

== Geography ==
Antirrio is situated at the western entrance of the Gulf of Corinth. It is 3 km northwest of Rio, 10 km north of Patras and 9 km southwest of Naupactus. 8 km to the northwest is the 1,039 m high mountain Klokova (also known as Paliovouna), rising steeply from the Gulf of Patras coast. The Rio–Antirrio bridge, carrying Motorway 5, connects it with the Peloponnese peninsula. Greek National Road 5 connects it with Missolonghi and northwestern Greece, Greek National Road 48 with Naupactus and Livadeia.

== The port of Antirrio ==
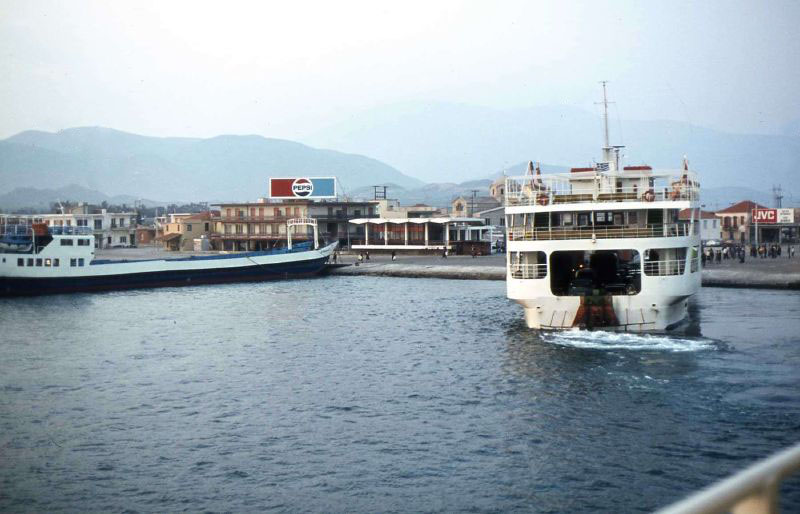
Port of Antirrio (1981)

The Port of Antirrio is served by ferries that carry traffic between the Peloponnese and northwestern Greece. Its significance has decreased since the opening of the Rio-Antirrio bridge in 2004. It is still in use as a ferry port for hazardous cargo and by users attracted by the scenic route or the lower fare for crossing the Rio-Antirrio strait. Adjacent to the port there is a lighthouse and the Castle of Antirrio.

On the eastern pier of Antirrio port there is the Antirrio RTS (Regional Traffic Service) which is part of the national Vessel traffic service system of Greece (Officially called Vessel Traffic Management and Information System). The RTS of Antirrio includes a building with the necessary electronics/communication equipment and a sensors/radar mast of 20m height. On top of the mast there is a remotely controlled CCTV camera, VHF antennas and the antenna of the coastal surveillance and navigation radar GEM RT02-25D.

== See also ==
- List of settlements in Aetolia-Acarnania
