= Nafpaktia =

Municipality in Aetolia, Greece

Nafpaktia Ναυπακτία
- Municipality
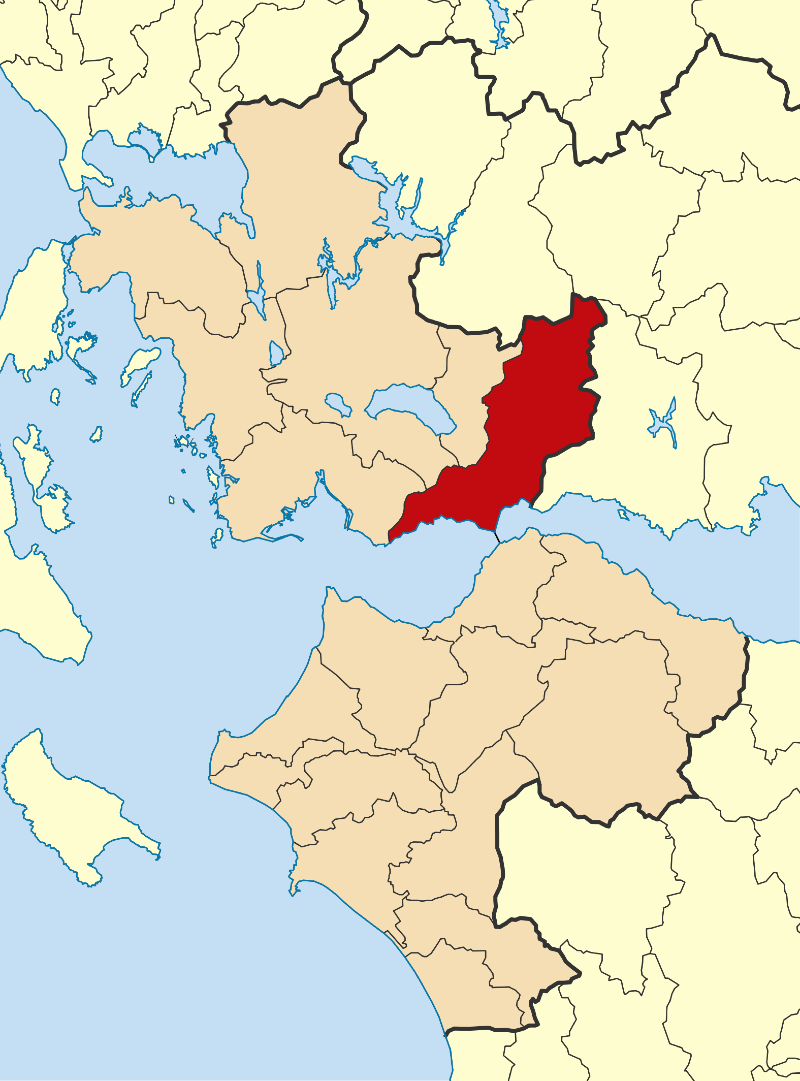

- Location within Greece
- Coordinates: 38°23′N 21°49′E
- Country: Greece
- Administrative region: Western Greece
- Regional unit: Aetolia-Acarnania
- Seat: Nafpaktos

Government
  - Mayor: Vasileios Gizas (since 2019)

Area
  - Municipality: 876.2 km^{2} (338.3 sq mi)

Population (2021)
  - Municipality: 25,065
  - Density: 28.61/km^{2} (74.09/sq mi)
- Time zone: UTC+2 (EET)
  - Summer (DST): UTC+3 (EEST)
- Website: www.nafpaktos.gr

Nafpaktia (Greek: Ναυπακτία), known in Ancient Greek as Naupactia, is the historical name for the region around the port town of Nafpaktos (Naupactus) in Central Greece. It is administered as a municipality of the Aetolia-Acarnania regional unit, with Nafpaktos as its seat. The municipality has an area of 876.209 km^{2}.

== Administration ==
The municipality Nafpaktia was formed at the 2011 local government reform by the merger of the following 6 former municipalities, that became municipal units:

- Antirrio
- Apodotia
- Chalkeia
- Naupactus
- Platanos
- Pyllini

=== Province ===
The province of Nafpaktia (Greek: Επαρχία Ναυπακτίας) was one of the provinces of the Aetolia-Acarnania Prefecture. Its territory corresponded with that of the current municipality Nafpaktia. It was abolished in 2006.

== Geography ==
The approximately 60 villages of the region are built at altitudes of 700 to 1,000 m (2,300–3,300 ft) and are located from 30 to 90 km (19–56 mi) away from Nafpaktos.

Villages include Elatou, built in a pine forest; Ano Chora, which used to be called Megali Lobotina and has a population of 30; and Katafygio, formerly Amorani, which is at an altitude of 650 m (2,130 ft) and is 33 km (21 mi) from Nafpaktos.
