= Chalaion =

Chalaion (Ancient Greek: Χάλαιον) may refer to:

- Chalai (Thessaly), a town in ancient Thessaly, Greece
- Chalaeum, a town in ancient Locris, Greece
