= Hyle (disambiguation) =

Hyle is a philosophical concept.

Hyle may also refer to:

- Hyle (Boeotia), a town of ancient Boeotia, Greece
- Hyle (Cyprus), a town of ancient Cyprus
- Hyle (Locris), a town of ancient Locris, Greece
- Michael William Hyle (1901-1967), American Roman Catholic bishop
