= Eupalium =

Coordinates: 38°24′54″N 21°56′11″E

Eupalium or Eupalion (Ancient Greek: Εὐπάλιον), or Eupolium or Eupolion (Εὐπόλιον), or Eupalia (Εὐπαλία) was one of the chief towns of Ozolian Locris, situated near the sea, and between Naupactus and Oeantheia. It was the place chosen by Demosthenes for the deposit of his plunder, in 426 BCE; and it was shortly afterwards taken by Eurylochus, the Spartan commander, along with Oeneon. After the time of Alexander the Great, Eupalium fell into the hands of the Aetolians; and Philip V of Macedon, when he made a descent upon the Aetolian coast in 207 BCE, landed at Erythrae, which is described by Livy as near Eupalium. This Erythrae was probably the port of Eupalium.

Eupalium's site is located near Kastro Soule.
