= Ap (water) =

Vedic Sanskrit term for "water"

Ap (áp-) is the Vedic Sanskrit term for "water", which in Classical Sanskrit only occurs in the plural āpas (sometimes re-analysed as a thematic singular, āpa-), whence Hindi āp. The term is from Proto Indo-European *h_{x}ap "water". (Note: The word has many cognates in archaic European toponyms, e.g., Mess-apia, and perhaps also Avon, from Old Brythonic abona or Welsh afon (pronounced [ˈavɔn]), both meaning 'river'.) The Indo-Iranian word also survives as the Persian word for water, āb, e.g. in Punjab (from panj-āb "five waters"). In archaic ablauting contractions, the laryngeal of the Proto Indo-European root remains visible in Vedic Sanskrit, e.g. pratīpa- "against the current", from *proti-h_{x}p-o-. In Tamil, āppu refers to water in old Tamil poetry.

In the Rigveda, several hymns are dedicated to "the waters" (āpas): 7.49, 10.9, 10.30, 10.137. In the oldest of these, 7.49, the waters are connected with the drought of Indra. Agni, the god of fire, has a close association with water and is often referred to as Apām Napāt offspring of the waters. In Vedic astrology, the female deity Apah is the presiding deity of the Purva Ashadha asterism, meaning "first of the aṣāḍhā", with aṣāḍhā "the invincible one" being the name of the greater constellation.

In Hindu philosophy, the term refers to water as an element, one of the Panchamahabhuta, or "five great elements". In Hinduism, it is also the name of the deva Varuna a personification of water, one of the Vasus in most later Puranic lists.

== See also ==
- Varuna, the god of water
- Samudra, the sea god
- Abzu, the Sumerian primeval waters
- Aban or āpō, the Avestan concept of "the waters"
- Doab, spit of land lying between two confluent rivers
- Old European hydronymy
- Rigvedic rivers
- Sea and river deity
