= Hessus (Locris) =

Ancient Greek town in Ozolian Locrians

Hessus or Hessos (Ancient Greek: Ἡσσός) was a town of the Ozolian Locrians, upon the coast of the Corinthian Gulf, and on the road to Naupactus.

Its site is unlocated.
