= Phaestus (disambiguation) =

Phaistos is an ancient city in Crete, Greece.

Phaistos (ancient Greek: Φαιστός), also Latinised at Phaestos and Phaestus may also refer to:

- Phaestus (Elis), a town of ancient Elis, Greece
- Phaestus (Locris), a town of ancient Locris, Greece
- Phaestus (Thessaly), a town of ancient Thessaly, Greece
