= Teichium =

Coordinates: 38°29′16″N 21°59′37″E

Teichium or Teichion (Ancient Greek: Τείχιον) was a town in Aetolia Epictetus, on the borders of Locris, and one day's march from Crocyleium.

Its site is tentatively located near the modern Teichio.
