= Poteidania =

Ancient town in Aetolia Epictetus, modern Greece

Coordinates: 38°27′12″N 22°00′10″E

Poteidania (Ancient Greek: Ποτειδανία) or Potidania (Ποτιδανία) was a town in Aetolia Epictetus, on the borders of Ozolian Locris, and one day's march from Oeneon.

Its site is tentatively located near the modern Kampos. The village Poteidania is on 850 m. altitude and is located right in hillside of the mountain Trikorfo. The population is 346 based on census of 2001. The whole village extends to 28.679 s.m. There are multiple ways to reach the village. The first one is taking the highway of Athens-Lamia and cross the Rio-Antirrio bridge to reach Nafpaktos. From there you continue to Efpalio and 23 km after Efpalio there is a sign for Potidania. It is about half an hour from Nafpaktos. The other way to reach the village is from Amfissa, taking the way to Lidoriki and from there continue to Efpalio and the rest follows as previously.

This village is worth visiting not for the human constructions but for the beauty of nature. The village is full of trees and especially with firs and has many mini waterfalls nearby. In this beautiful environment with clean and fresh running water everywhere, people have built stone fountains with benches and wooden tables that someone could stop and take a rest. The view from the village is pretty stunning.

Since it is a mountainous village, there are many small paths inside the forest that lead you to nice places, such as small churches or river Mornos etc. and it is totally worth to visit. The paths are fully signaled and visitors can easily follow the directions to reach their destination with safety. The wild nature makes the experience unique and everyone would love to go again and again.

Every year during the summer, the association of the village organises big cultural events for the local people but also to attract tourists and other visitors from near villages. The programme includes notable theatrical pieces with famous actors, speeches that everyone can participate, discuss and share his opinion but it also includes concerts with well-known singers.
