= Chalai =

Chalai may refer to:

- Chalai, a name used in parts of Southern India and in Sri Lanka for fish called sardine
- Chalai, Sri Lanka, a place north of Mullaitivu
  - Battle of Chalai, fought 2009 during the Sri Lankan civil war
- Chalai (Thessaly), a town of ancient Thessaly, Greece
