= Fethiye Mosque (Nafpaktos) =

Former mosque in Nafpaktos, Greece

- Φετιχιέ Τζαμί
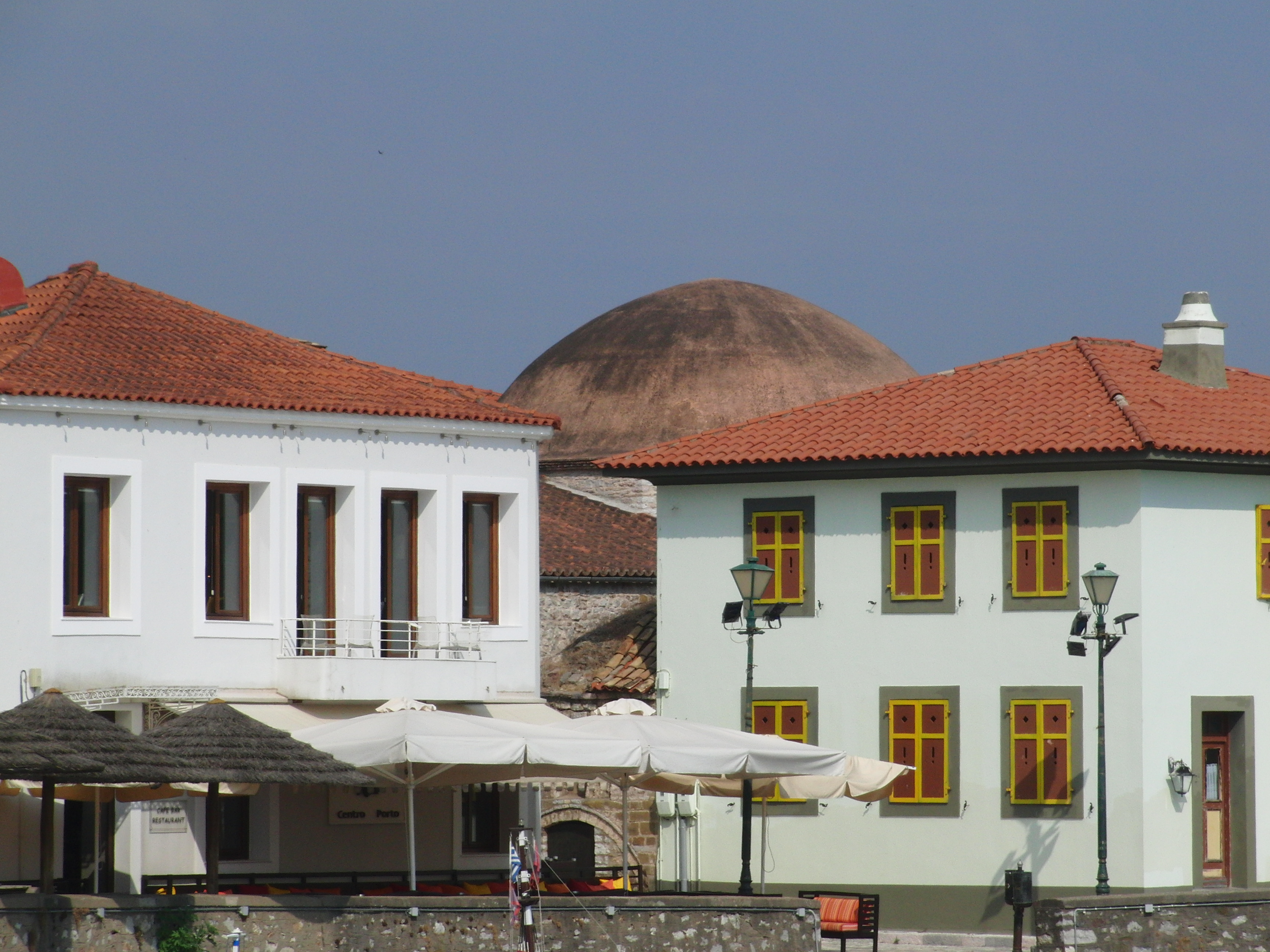
- The dome of the former mosque seen from the harbour of the modern town

- Location of the former mosque in Greece

Religion
- Affiliation: Islam (former)
- Ecclesiastical or organizational status: Mosque (1499–1820s)
- Status: Abandoned (as a mosque); Repurposed (for cultural use)

Location
- Location: Nafpaktos, Aetolia-Acarnania
- Country: Greece
- Interactive map of Fethiye Mosque
- Coordinates: 38°23′33″N 21°49′48″E

Architecture
- Type: Mosque
- Style: Ottoman
- Completed: 1499
- Dome: 1

The Fethiye Mosque (Greek: Φετιχιέ τζαμί; Turkish: Fethiye Camii, lit. 'Mosque of the Conquest') is a former mosque in Nafpaktos, Greece. Completed in 1499 during the Ottoman era, the mosque was abandoned during the 1820s; and was repurposed for cultural use.

It was built on the orders of Sultan Bayezid II immediately after the capture of the city from the Venetians in 1499, and was the city's main mosque throughout the Ottoman period. It was also known as the Bayezid-i Veli Mosque after its founder. The mosque has been extensively restored and now functions as an exhibition hall.

== See also ==
- Islam in Greece
- List of former mosques in Greece
- Ottoman Greece
