= Olpae (Locris) =

Olpae or Olpai (Ancient Greek: Ὄλπαι) was a fortress of Ozolian Locris.
