= Hylates =

Ancient Cypriot god

Coordinates: 34°40′23″N 32°51′49″E

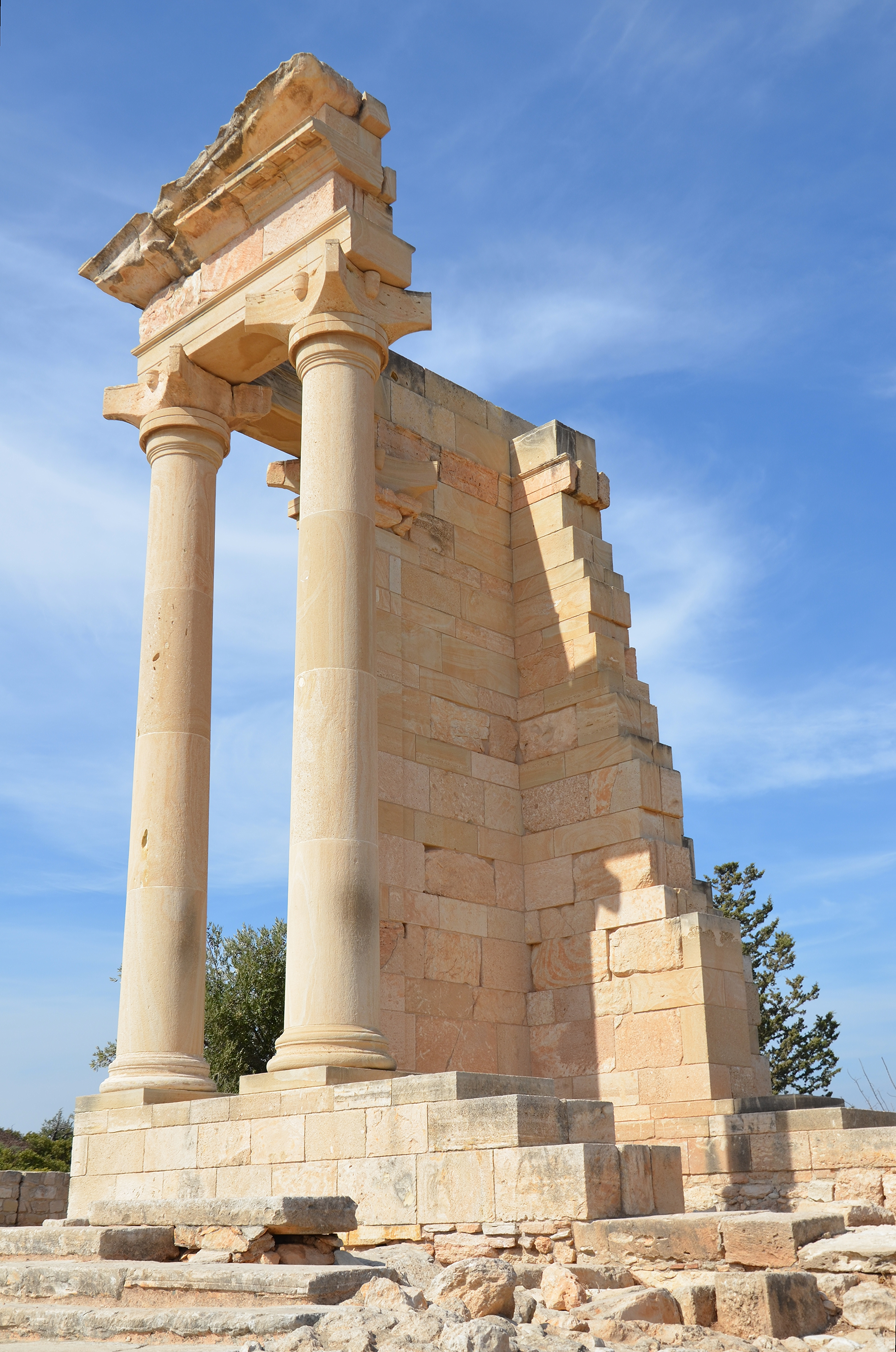
The temple of Apollo at Kourion

Hylates (Ancient Greek: Ὑλάτης) was a god worshipped on the island of Cyprus who was later likened to the Greek god Apollo. His name probably derives from ὑλακτέω [ʰylaktéō] "barking" or ὕλη [ʰýlē] "forest".

An important sanctuary was located in Kourion.

Stephanus of Byzantium also mentions the Cypriot cities of Amamassos, Erystheia, Hyle, and Tembros as places where Apollo Hylates was worshipped. John Tzetzes adds that Apollo received the epithet Hylates from Hyle, a location near the region of Kourion.

== The Sanctuary of Apollo Hylates in Kourion ==
The sanctuary is located about 2.5 kilometres (1.6 mi) west of the ancient town of Kourion along the road which leads to Pafos. It was one of the main religious centres of ancient Cyprus, where Apollo was worshipped as god of the woodlands. It seems that the worship of Apollo on this site began as early as the eighth century BC and continued until the fourth century AD. The site has undergone many extensions and alterations in different periods. The majority of the monuments as they can be seen today belong to the site's first century AD restorations. A wall from which one could enter the site via the Kourion Gate and the Pafos Gate surrounds the sanctuary.

Originally the site consisted of a temple, traces of which survive in the foundations of the present temple; a circular monument, which was probably destined for processions or dances around a grove of sacred trees; and a formalized archaic altar and precinct. During the Roman period the site was extended with the addition of the South and North Buildings, which may have been used for the display of votives or the accommodation of visitors. Terracotta figurines and pottery that were accumulated in the temple from the fifth century BC to the Roman period were buried in the votive pit. A long street running from south to north leads to the Temple of Apollo Hylates, which was built in the Late Classical or Early Hellenistic period on the ruins of the archaic temple. In the first century AD the temple was rebuilt with a different architectural style, with Nabatean columns. A small building south of the precinct may have been a priest's house. Along the external east side of the walls are the palaestra where athletes once exercised and played games, and the baths.

== Literature ==
- Buitron, Diana; Birge, Darice. "Sanctuary of Apollo Hylates, Kourion, 1980. Excavations; the Cult". In: American Journal of Archaeology, vol 85.2, Boston 1981. pp. 187–188.
- Buitron-Oliver, Diana et al., The sanctuary of Apollo Hylates at Kourion. Excavations in the Archaic precinct. Studies in Mediterranean Archaeology 109, 1996. ISBN 91-7081-094-X.
- Glover, Stephen C. "Sanctuaries of Apollo Hylates at Dhrymou and Chytroi". In: American Journal of Archaeology, Band 86.2, Boston: 1982. pp. 265–266.
- Hollinshead, Mary B. "Review: "The Sanctuary of Apollo Hylates at Kourion, edited by David Soren"". In: American Journal of Archaeology Band 93.4, Boston: 1989. pp. 623–624.
- Mitford, T. B. (1960). "A Cypriot Oath of Allegiance to Tiberius". The Journal of Roman Studies. 50 (1–2): 75–79. doi:10.2307/298288. JSTOR 298288. S2CID 162555511.
- Scranton, Robert (1967). "The Architecture of the Sanctuary of Apollo Hylates at Kourion". Transactions of the American Philosophical Society. 57 (5): 3–85. doi:10.2307/1006122. JSTOR 1006122.
- Senff, Reinhard. "Kurion". In: Hubert Cancik, Helmuth Schneider u. Manfred Landfester (Hrsgg.). Der Neue Pauly Vol. 6 Iul–Lee, Stuttgart 1999.
- Sinos, S. The Temple of Apollo Hylates at Kourion and the Restoration of its south-west corner. Athens: 1990.
- Soren, D. The Sanctuary of Apollo Hylates at Kourion. Tucson: 1987.
