= Giannis Vlachogiannis =

Greek writer

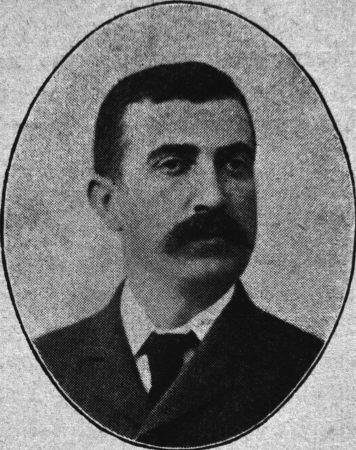
Giannis Vlachogiannis

Giannis Vlachogiannis or Vlachos (Greek: Γιάννης Βλαχογιάννης/Βλάχος; Nafpaktos, 27 July 1867 – Athens, 23 August 1945) was a Greek historian and writer.
