= Dafni, Aetolia-Acarnania =

Dafni Δάφνη
- Community
- Location within Greece
- Coordinates: 38°25′16″N 21°52′05″E
- Country: Greece
- Administrative region: Western Greece
- Regional unit: Aetolia-Acarnania
- Municipality: Nafpaktia
- Municipal unit: Nafpaktos

Population (2021)
  - Community: 772
- Time zone: UTC+2 (EET)
  - Summer (DST): UTC+3 (EEST)

Dafni is a village and a community in the municipality of Nafpaktia, Aetolia-Acarnania, Greece. The community consists of the villages Dafni (also Ano Dafni), Kato Dafni (the largest village of the community) and Trypou, now uninhabited. During the centuries of Ottoman occupation, Dafni was located higher up in the hills in an area called now Old Dafni (Paliodafni); of that settlement only the foundations of a few houses survive. The name Dafni means laurel. It comes either from the laurel plant that is indigenous to the area or from small plants called also dafni that grow in abundance on the banks of the nearby river Mornos (its alternative but rarely used name is Dafnos).

The settlement of Kato Dafni began in the early 20th century and before World War II it had less than 20 houses. Now it is a thriving and rapidly growing part of Nafpaktos. Its landmarks are the impressive St Paraskevi Cathedral, the construction of which is still ongoing, and the Mornos river bridge with its five arches, constructed in 1939 as part of Greece's preparation for the war. The river is now mostly dry; its water is used for farm irrigation but most of it is diverted to the municipal water supply of Athens.

Dafni in general and Kato Dafni in particular, have a cultural history. locals, most of them retired, gather at its roadside cafes to analyze geopolitical issues and world affairs. Politics and international events receive daily scrutiny by people keeping abreast through radio, television and newspapers. Financial issues, mainly capital markets, are analyzed as well. Nothing escapes the antennae of these idle pensioners who have formed closed groups with thought and animated by cultural concerns. Among them are retired teachers of all levels of education ranging from kindergarten to university.

The area's agricultural products include olives, figs and oranges, with significant land dedicated to orange groves.

Kato Dafni's water was considered to have therapeutic properties and before the cortisone era many used it to treat skin diseases.

Dafni has been visited by famous contemporaries including the Italian poet and Nobel laureate Eugenio Montale. Due to language barriers he was unable to converse with the groups of Kato Dafni's passionate discussants.
