= Tolophon =

Coordinates: 38°22′10″N 22°17′24″E

Tolophon (Ancient Greek: Τολοφών), also Tolphon (Τολφών), was a town of the Ozolian Locrians, possessing a large harbour according to Dicaearchus.

Its site is located near modern Agioi Pantes/Vidavi/Marmara.
