= Stamatis Stamatiou =

Greek journalist, writer and politician

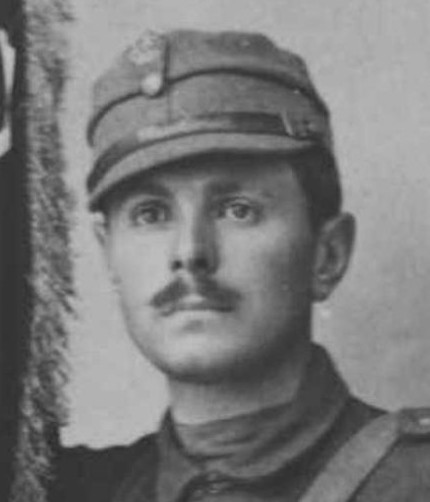
- Stamatiou in the Second Balkan War (1913).

Stamatis Stamatiou (Nafpaktos 1881 - Thessaloniki 9 July 1946) was a Greek journalist, author, cartoonist and politician. As a journalist and author he is more widely known with his initials "Stam. Stam.", his usual signature. He served as prefect in prefectures of Macedonia and Crete.

== Early life and studies ==
He was born in Nafpaktos in 1881. His parents were Georgios and Vassiliki Stamatiou (née Andreopoulou). His younger brother was Haris Stamatiou (1890-1951), also a journalist and an author.

He got involved in journalism from a very young age, first writing for the ''Diaplasis ton Paidon'' and later working for the Akropolis of Vlassis Gavriilidis. He graduated from the Lycee Leonin of Athens and studied law at the University of Athens.

He spent the Balkan Wars in the Greek Army while working as a journalist and writing military stories. In a heroic feat, when a reserve corporal, in July 1913, he stole a red flag when fighting against the Bulgarians in the battle of Strumica in July 1913. For this action, he was honoured with a promotion to the rank of sergeant.

== Prefect ==
Stamatiou was a Venizelist. In the 1910s he served as vice-governor in Sidirokastro, later in Kastoria. He took part in the National Defense Movement. He was prefect of Florina (1917-1918), Pella (1918-1920, 1922–1924), Drama (1924-1925) and Rethymno (1929-1933).

== Humorist and cartoonist ==
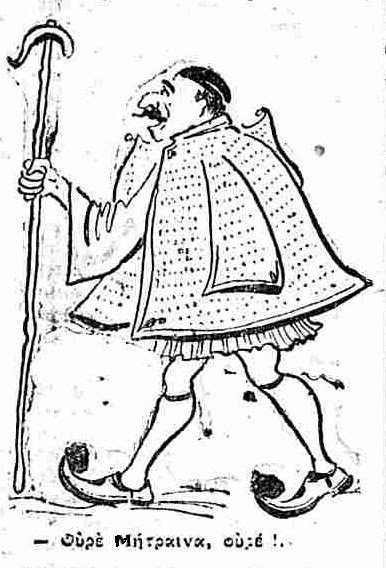
A cartoon by Stam. Stam depicting «Mitros», a characteristic type of Roumeliote villager (around 1930).

Stamatiou wrote many humorous stories in various newspapers and journals (Akropolis, Ethnos, Μπουκέτο, κ.ά.). His writings, written in a Roumeliote dialect and accompanied by his cartoons, were signed by his initials "Stam. Stam." and were generally titled "Stories from the village." This was the title of the book containing some of his humorous stories in 1946. In 1974 another volume of humorous stories was published under the title "Humorous and satirical" (Greek: Εύθυμα και σατιρικά).

== Last years and death ==
During the Greco-Italian War of 1940-1941 he followed the Greek Army as a war correspondent till Pogradec. During the Occupation, his health suffererd. He died in Thessaloniki on July 9, 1946.

Stamatiou received the Silver Cross of the Order of the Saviour for his offer to the Greek nation. He also received the title of Knight of the Legion of Honour from the government of France in 1918.

He got married in 1922 with Theano Dodou, from Edessa, where he spent the last years of his life.

Η. The Society of Nafpaktian Studies held a philological conference in Stamatiou's and his brother's, Haris's, honour in 1999.
