= Tritaea (Locris) =

Coordinates: 38°24′44″N 22°18′57″E

Tritaea or Triteia (Ancient Greek: Τρίτεια) was a town of the Ozolian Locrians, described by Stephanus of Byzantium as lying between Phocis and the Ozolian Locrians. During the Peloponnesian War, the town was one of several that were forced to provide hostages to the Lacedaemonian army in 426 BCE. Several inscriptions mentioning the town have been found. One of them refers to an agreement of sympoliteia signed with the bordering city of Chalaeum, according to which the inhabitants of each of the towns could own or lease land in the neighboring one.

Its site is located near modern Penteoria.
