= Ipnus =

Ipnus or Ipnos (Ancient Greek: Ἴπνος) was a town of the Ozolian Locrians, of uncertain site.

Its site is unlocated.
