= Crocyleium =

Town

Coordinates: 38°26′57″N 21°58′01″E

Crocyleium or Krokyleion (Ancient Greek: Κροκύλειον) was a town in Aetolia Epictetus, on the borders of Locris, and one day's march from Potidania.

Its site is tentatively located near the modern Filothei.
