= Erythrae (Locris) =

Coordinates: 38°24′27″N 21°56′40″E

Erythrae or Erythrai (Ancient Greek: Ἐρυθραί) was a town of the Ozolian Locrians, probably the harbour of Eupalium.

The site of Erythrae is tentatively identified with the modern site of Monastiraki.
