= Messapia =

Messapia may refer to:

- The ancient region occupied by the extinct Messapii tribe
- The modern region of Salento, roughly equivalent to the ancient region
- Messapia (Locris)
- Messapia, Greece
