= Messapia (Locris) =

Messapia (Ancient Greek: Μεσσαπία) was a town in Ozolian Locris.

Its site is unlocated.
