= Chalaeum =

Coordinates: 38°22′41″N 22°23′14″E

Chalaeum or Chalaion (Ancient Greek: Χάλαιον) or Chaleion (Χάλειον) or Chaleos (Χαλεώς) was an ancient town on the coast of the Locri Ozolae, near the borders of Phocis. Pliny the Elder erroneously calls it a town of Phocis. During the Peloponnesian War, the town was one of several that were forced to provide hostages to the Lacedaemonian army in 426 BCE. Several inscriptions mentioning the town have been found. One of them refers to an agreement of sympoliteia signed with the bordering city of Tritaea, according to which the inhabitants of each of the towns could own or lease land in the neighboring one.

Its site has been located near modern Galaxidi.
