= Oeneon =

Coordinates: 38°24′56″N 21°58′24″E

Oeneon or Oineon (Ancient Greek: Οἰνεών), also Oenoa or Oinoa (Οἰνόα) and Oenoe or Oinoe (Οἰνόη), was a town of the Ozolian Locrians, east of Naupactus, possessing a port and a sacred enclosure of the Nemeian Zeus, where Hesiod was said to have been killed. It was from this place that Demosthenes set out on his expedition into Aetolia in 426 BC, and to which he returned with the remnant of his forces.

The site of Oeneon is located at Klima Efpalio/Magoula.
