= Hyle (Locris) =

Hyle (Ancient Greek: Ὕλη) was a town in Ozolian Locris in ancient Greece, from which the river Hylaethus perhaps derived its name.

Its site is unlocated.
