= Phaestus (Locris) =

Phaestus or Phaestos or Phaistos (Ancient Greek: Φαιστός) was a town of the Ozolian Locrians, with a port called the port of Apollo Phaestius.

The site of Phaestus is tentatively placed at Kisseli Panormos (38°22′22″N 22°14′56″E).
