= Hyle (Cyprus) =

Ancient Cyprus site

Hyle (Ancient Greek: Ὕλη) was a town in ancient Cyprus, with a sanctuary of Apollo, whence Apollo was called Hyletes (or Hylates). Its site is unlocated.
