= Chalai (Thessaly) =

Coordinates: 39°08′57″N 22°34′07″E

Chalai or Chalaion was a town in Phthiotis in ancient Thessaly. The town's name is not attested directly, but s extrapolated from its demonym, Χαλαῖος.

Its site has been located at a place called Tsournati, where archaeological remains from the Archaic and Classical periods have been found.
