= Nafpaktos =

Town in Western Greece

Nafpaktos Ναύπακτος
- Municipal unit
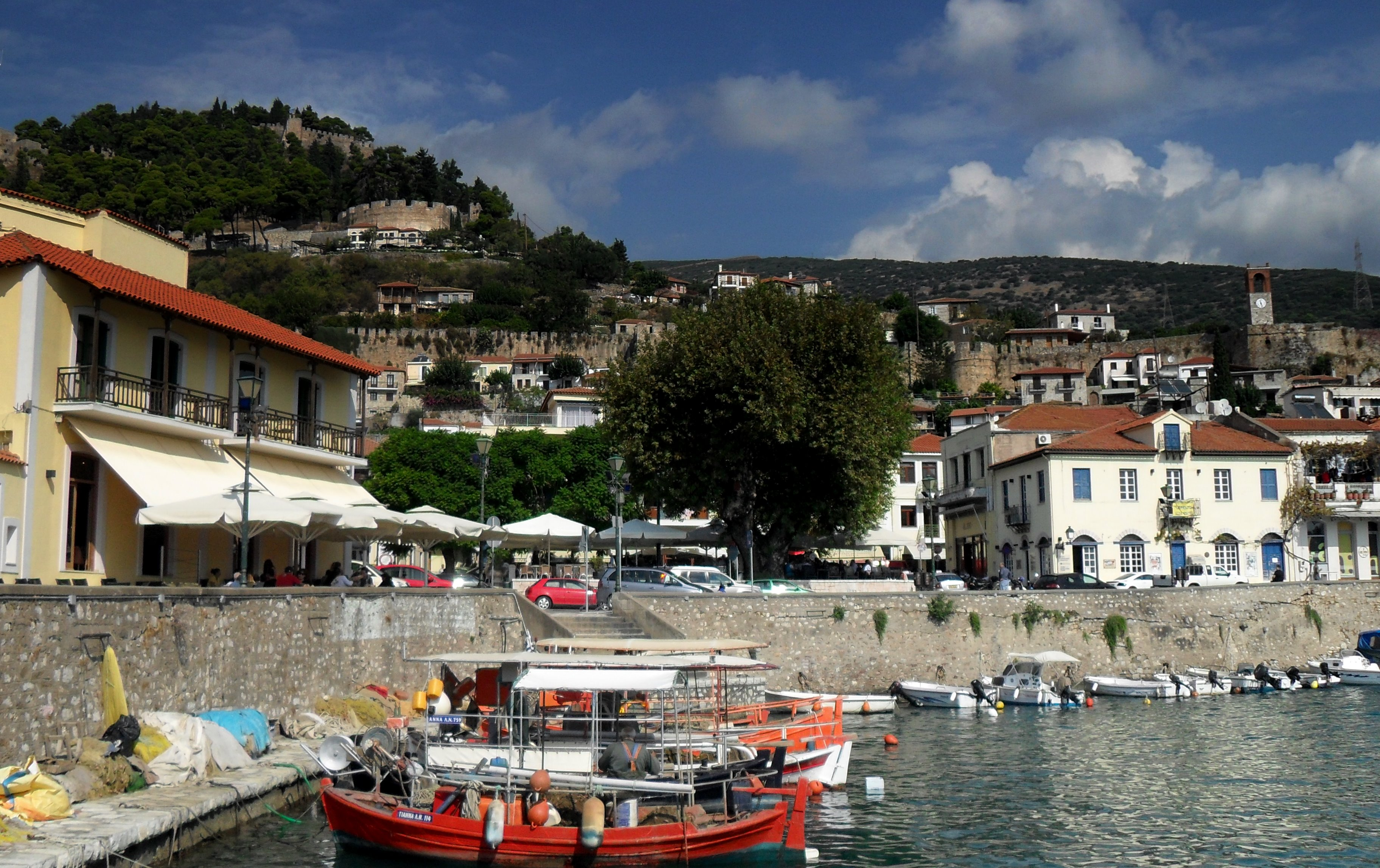
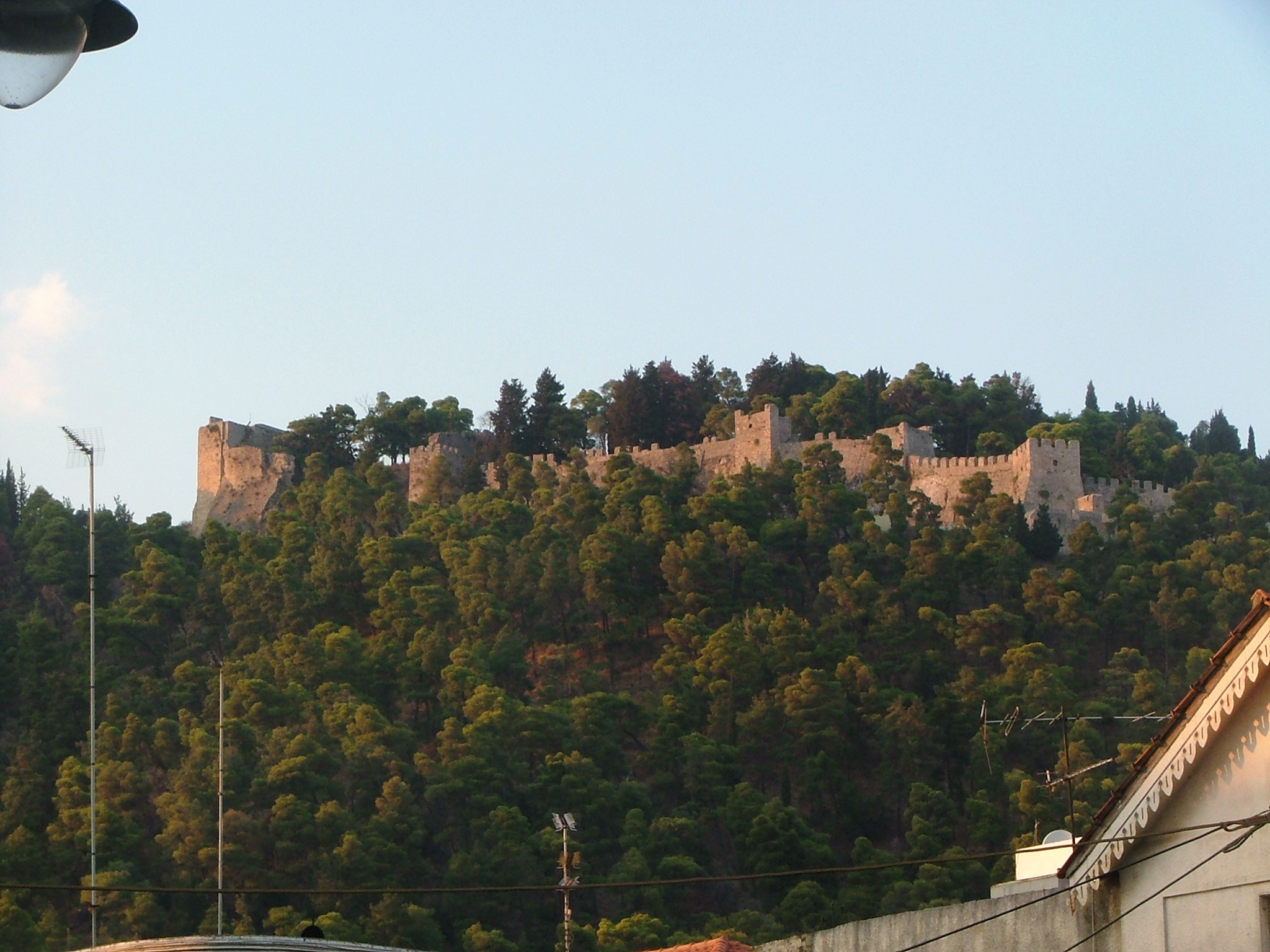
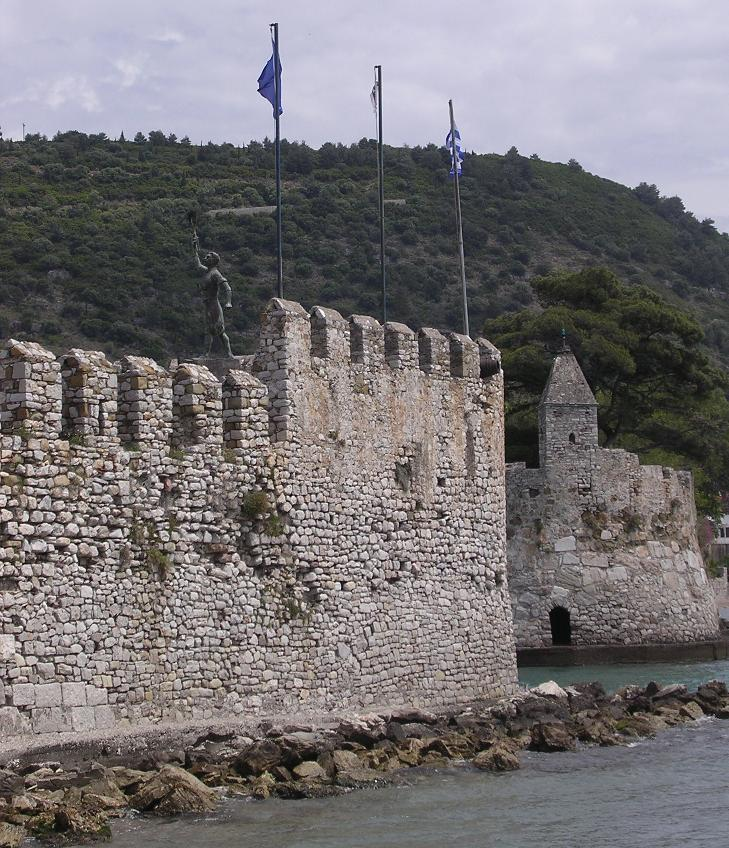
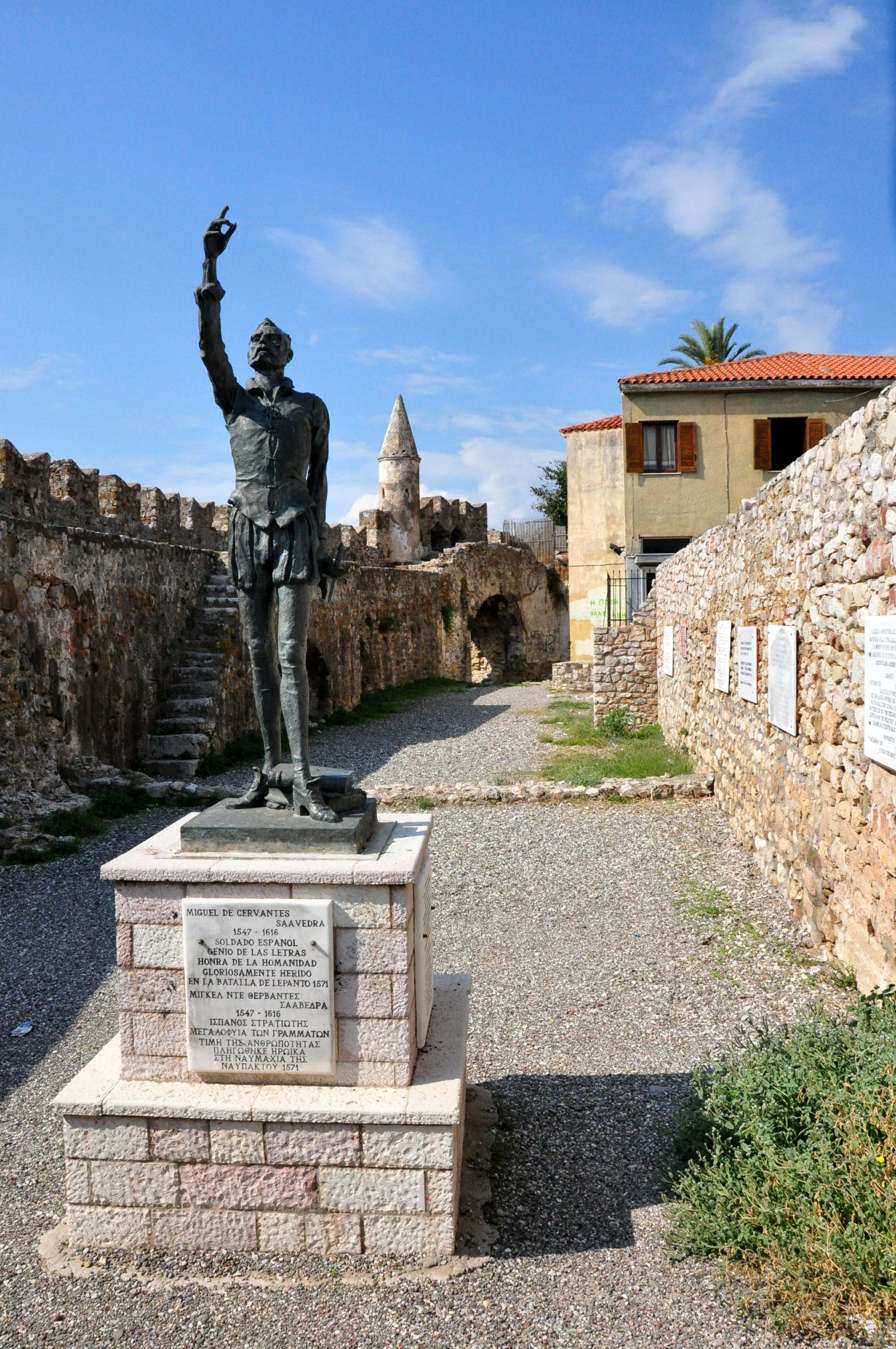
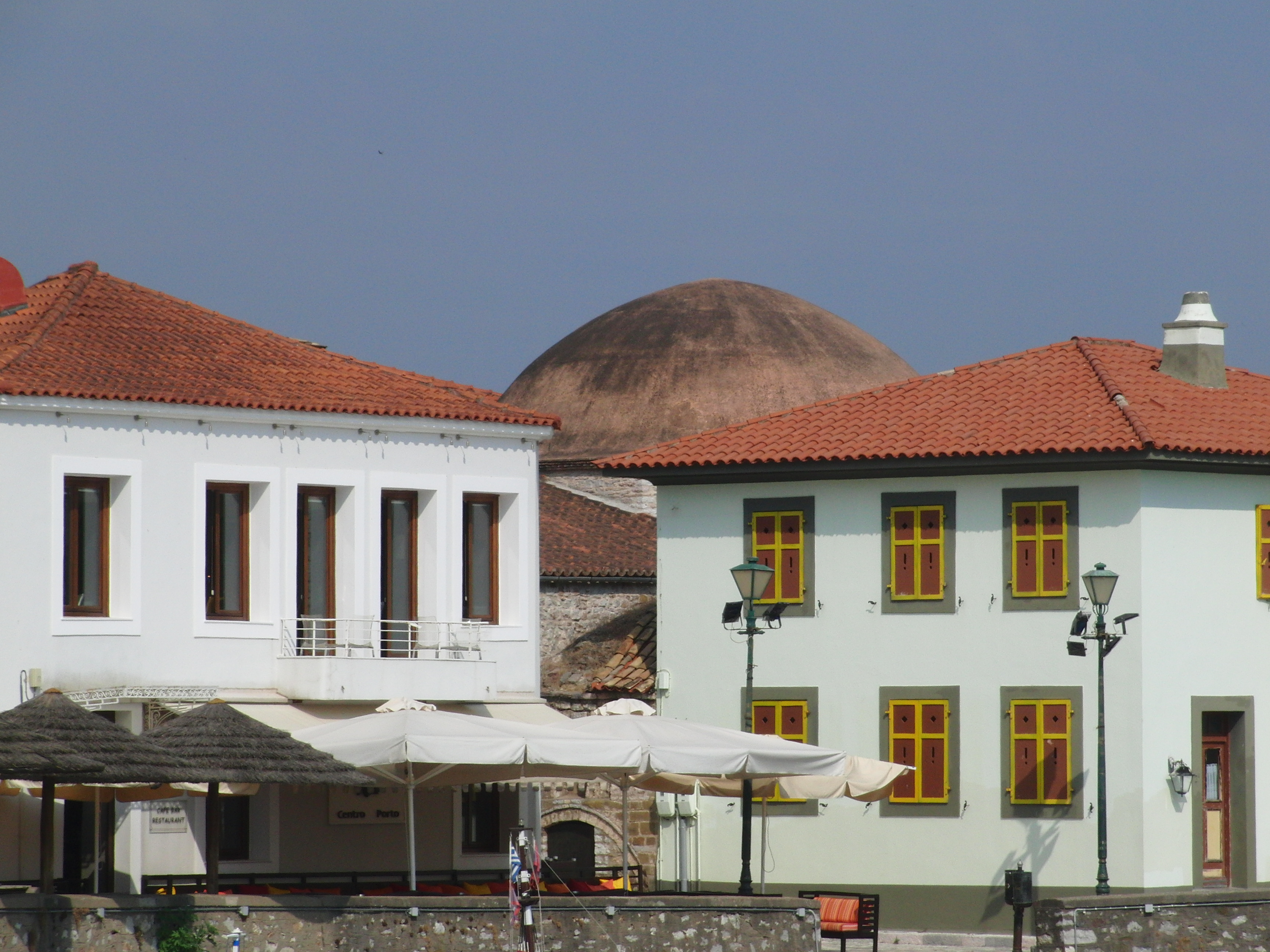
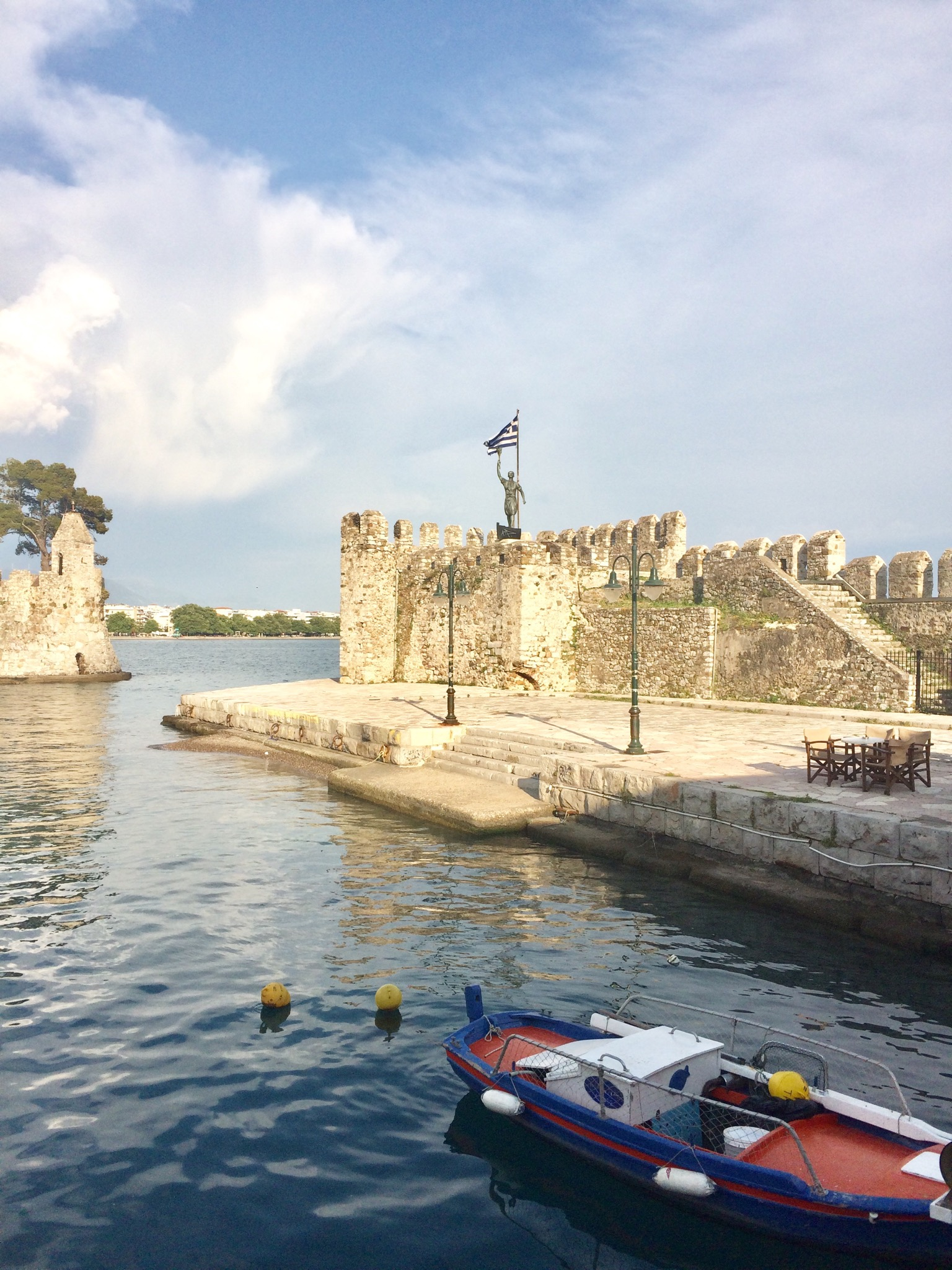
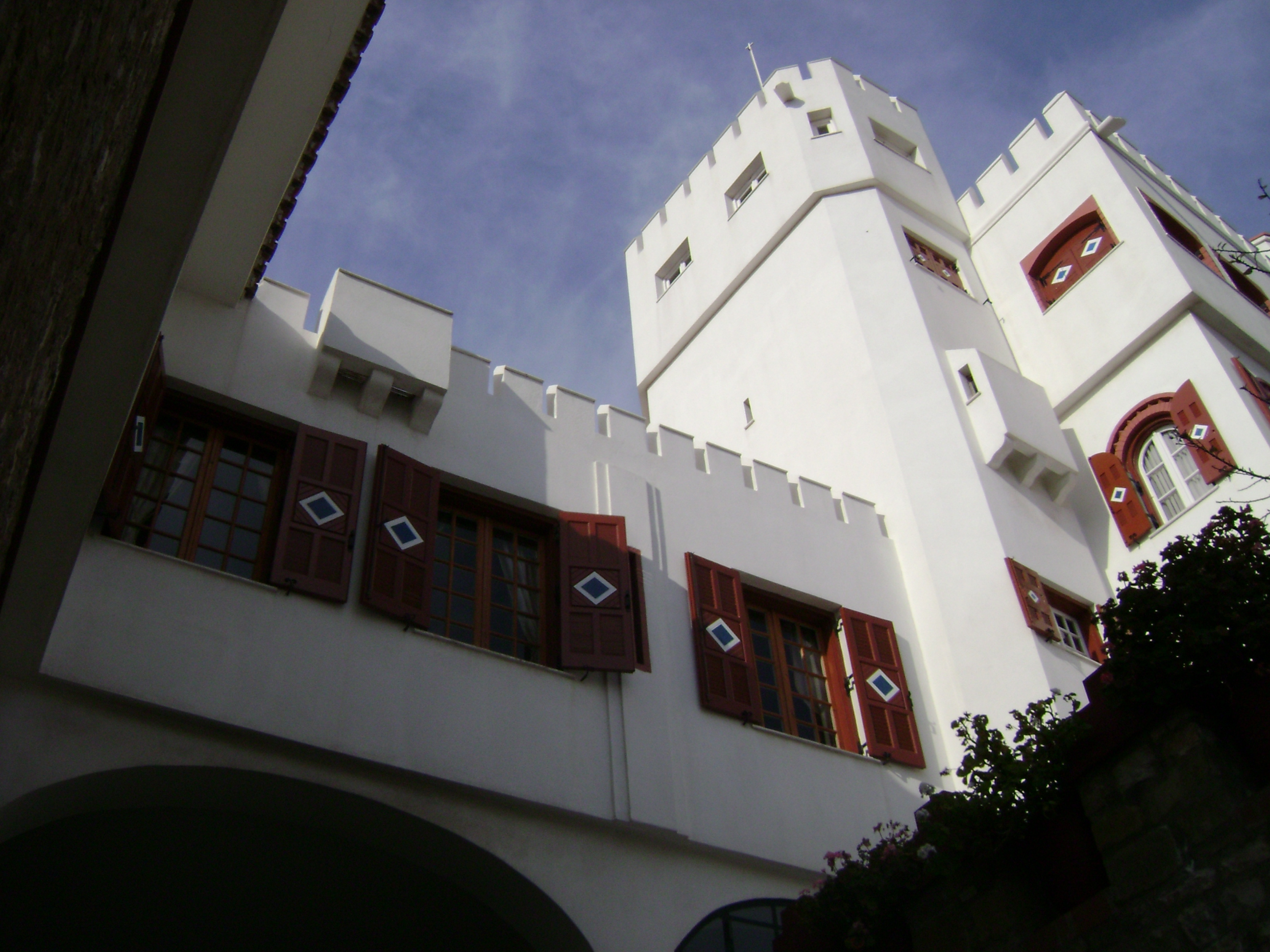
- Clockwise from top right: Old Port of Naupactus, Nafpaktos' Port Fortifications, Old Houses with Fethiye Mosque in the back, Botsaris Tower Museum, Giorgos Anemogiannis Statue in the Port Fortifications, Miguel de Cervantes Statue, Venetian Fortress of Lepanto

- Location within Greece
- Coordinates: 38°23′38″N 21°49′50″E
- Country: Greece
- Administrative region: West Greece
- Regional unit: Aetolia-Akarnania
- Municipality: Nafpaktia

Area
  - Municipal unit: 159.9 km^{2} (61.7 sq mi)
- Highest elevation: 15 m (49 ft)
- Lowest elevation: 0 m (0 ft)

Population (2021)
  - Municipal unit: 17,154
  - Municipal unit density: 107.3/km^{2} (277.9/sq mi)
  - Community: 12,950
- Time zone: UTC+2 (EET)
  - Summer (DST): UTC+3 (EEST)
- Postal code: 303 00
- Area code: 26340
- Vehicle registration: ME
- Website: www.nafpaktos.gr

Nafpaktos (Greek: Ναύπακτος) or Naupactus, is a town and a former municipality in Nafpaktia, Aetolia-Acarnania, West Greece, situated on a bay on the north coast of the Gulf of Corinth, 3 km (2 mi) west of the mouth of the river Mornos.

It is named for Naupaktos (Ναύπακτος, Latinized as Naupactus), an important Athenian naval station in the Peloponnesian War. As a strategically crucial possession controlling access to the Gulf of Corinth, Naupaktos changed hands many times during the Crusades and the Ottoman–Venetian Wars. It was under Venetian control in the 15th century, and came to be known by the Venetian form of its name, Lepanto. It fell to the Ottoman Empire in 1499 and was used as a naval station by the Ottoman Navy in the 16th century, being the site of the decisive victory by the Holy League in the Battle of Lepanto in 1571. Except for a brief period of Venetian control in 1687–1699, Lepanto remained under Ottoman control until Greek independence in 1829.

The modern municipality was incorporated in 1946, and later merged into the larger Nafpaktia municipality in the 2010 reform. Nafpaktos is now both the name of a municipal unit within Nafpaktia and of the town proper within the Nafpaktos unit. The municipal district has an area of 159,947 square kilometres (61,756 square miles), with a population close to 20,000 as of 2011.

The town is 9 km (6 mi) northeast of Antirrio, 18 km (11 mi) northeast of Patras, 35 km (22 mi) east of Missolonghi and 45 km (28 mi) southeast of Agrinio. The Greek National Road 48/E65 (Antirrio – Nafpaktos – Delphi – Livadeia) passes north of the town.

== Name ==
The ancient name Naupaktos (Ναύπακτος) means "boatyard" (from ναύς naus "ship" and πήγ- pêg- "to fix, fasten"). It was later Latinized as Naupactus. By the late medieval period, the local name had evolved into Nepahtos (Νέπαχτος), Epaktos or Epahtos (Έπακτος, Έπαχτος). By the "Franks" (Latins) it was called Neopant, Nepant or Lepant. French sources of the 14th century give Nepant or Neopant; Venetian sources have Nepanto or Lepanto.

The name was adapted in Ottoman Turkish from Greek Νέπαχτος as Aynabahti or İnebahtı.

The original ancient name was revived in modern Greece in the 19th century.

== History ==
=== Antiquity ===
In Greek legend, Naupactus is the place where the Heraclidae built a fleet to invade the Peloponnese.

In Classical Antiquity, it was an important town of the Locri Ozolae and the best harbour on the northern coast of the Corinthian Gulf. The town was situated just within the entrance of this gulf, a little east of the promontory Antirrhium. It is said to have derived its name from the Heracleidae having here built the fleet with which they crossed over to Peloponnesus.

Though Naupactus was indebted for its historical importance to its harbour at the entrance of the Corinthian gulf, it was probably originally chosen as a site for a city on account of its strong hill, fertile plains, and copious supply of running water. After the Greco-Persian Wars it fell into the power of the Athenians, who settled there the Messenians, who had been compelled to leave their country at the end of the Third Messenian War in 464 BCE, and during the Peloponnesian War it was the headquarters of the Athenians in all their operations in Western Greece, and the scene of the Battle of Naupactus in 429 BCE. After the Battle of Aegospotami the Messenians were expelled from Naupactus, and the Locrians regained possession of the town. Afterwards it passed into the hands of the Achaeans, from whom, however, it was wrested by Epaminondas. Philip II of Macedon gave it to the Aetolians, and hence it is frequently called a town of Aetolia. The Aetolians vigorously defended Naupactus against the Romans for two months in 191 BCE. Ptolemy calls it a town of the Locri Ozolae, to whom it must therefore have been assigned by the Romans after Pliny's time.

Pausanias saw at Naupactus a temple of Poseidon near the sea, a temple of Artemis, a cave sacred to Aphrodite, and the ruins of a temple of Asclepius. The Roman playwright Plautus mentions Naupactus in his comedy Miles Gloriosus as the destination of an Athenian master (Pleusicles) who is on a diplomatic mission to the city.

Naupactus is mentioned in the 6th-century list of Hierocles, but it was destroyed by an earthquake in 551/2, during the reign of Justinian I.

=== Medieval and early modern history ===
The town and its hinterland were hit by an epidemic coming from Italy in 747/8 and almost deserted. From the late 9th century, probably the 880s, it was capital of the Byzantine thema of Nicopolis. At the same time, its bishopric was elevated to a metropolis. During the 9th–10th centuries, the town was an important harbour for the Byzantine navy and a strategic point for communication with the Byzantine possessions in southern Italy.

A rebellion of the local populace, which led to the death of the local strategos George, is recorded during the early reign of Constantine VIII (r. 1025–28). In 1040, the town did not take part in the uprising of Peter Delyan, and although attacked by the rebel army, alone among the towns of the theme of Nicopolis, it resisted successfully. St. Nicholas of Trani is recorded as having departed for Otranto in 1094 from the port. The history of the town over the next two centuries is obscure; during the visit of Benjamin of Tudela in 1165, there was a Jewish community of about 100 in the town.

Following the dissolution of the Byzantine Empire after the Fourth Crusade, it became part of the Despotate of Epirus. Under its metropolitan, John Apokaukos, the see of Naupactus gained in importance and headed the local synod for the southern half of the Epirote domains. In 1294, the town was ceded to Philip I, Prince of Taranto as part of the dowry of Thamar Angelina Komnene. The ruler of Thessaly, Constantine Doukas, attacked Epirus in the next year and captured Naupactus, but in 1296 handed most of his conquests back to the Angevins, and Naupactus became a major Angevin base on the Greek mainland.

In 1304 or 1305, the Epirotes recovered Naupactus during a war with the Angevins, but handed it back when peace was concluded in 1306. The town briefly became part of the Serbian Empire during the 1350s.

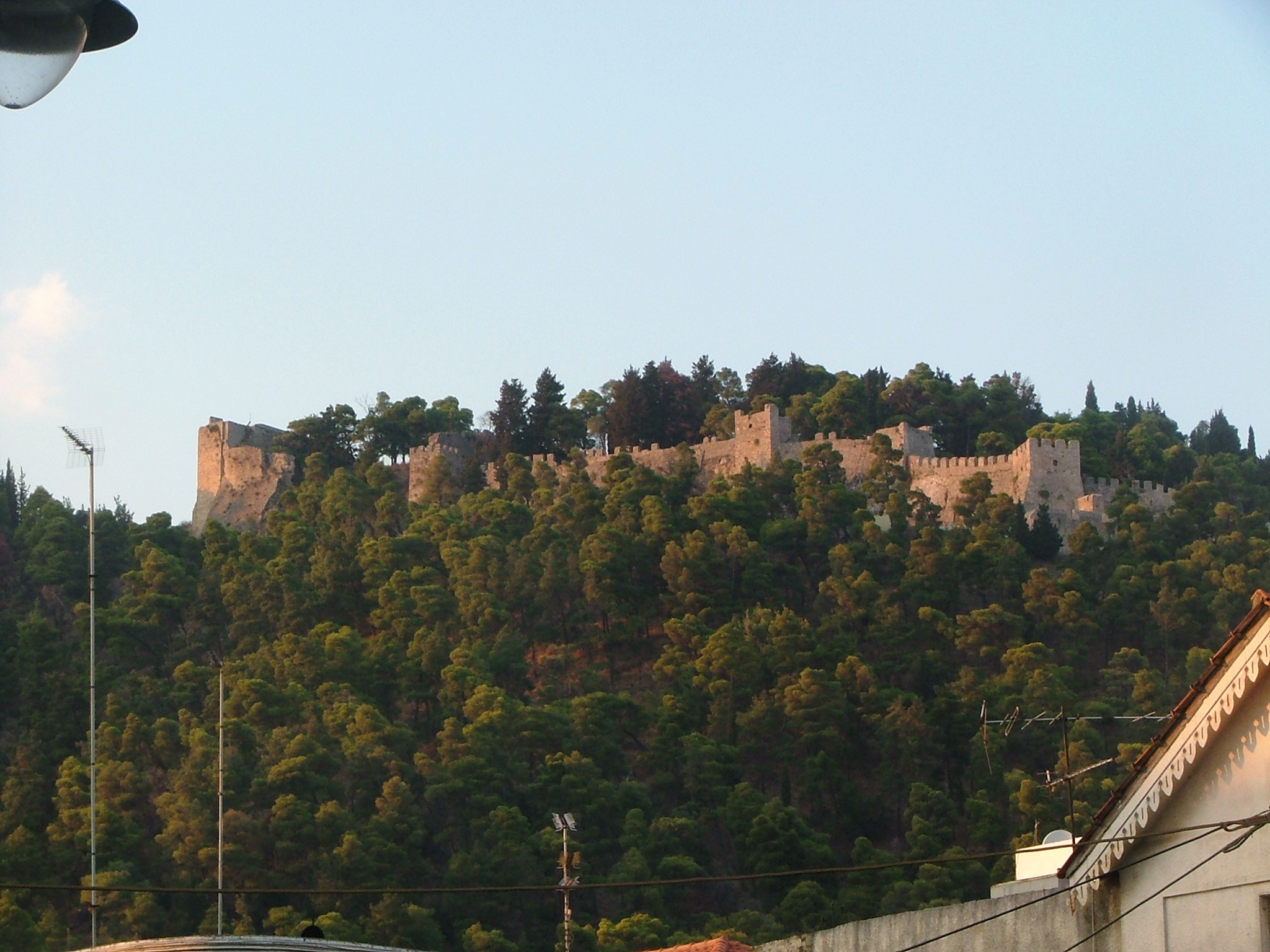
The Venetian fortress.

In 1361 the town was captured by the Catalans of the Duchy of Athens. In 1376 or 1377 it fell to John Bua Spata, an Albanian despot of Arta. It was briefly occupied Knights Hospitaller in 1378, and, now wedged between the expanding lands of the Count of Cephalonia Carlo I Tocco and the Ottoman possessions, sold to the Republic of Venice by Paul Spata in 1407.

After 1449, the town was an isolated Venetian exclave in Ottoman territory, as the Ottomans completed their conquest of the rest of Epirus and Aetolia-Acarnania. The town was important to Venice, as it secured their trade through the Corinthian Gulf, and the Republic took care to erect strong fortifications to secure its possession. In the end, the fortress fell to the Ottomans in 1499, during the Second Ottoman–Venetian War.

The Battle of Lepanto, National Maritime Museum, Greenwich/London.

Under the Ottomans, Naupactus was known as Aynabahtı, İnebahtı and was the seat of an Ottoman province. In 1521 (Hijri 927) the town had 509 Christian, 84 Jewish, and 28 Roma households. The mouth of the Gulf of Lepanto was the scene of the great sea battle in which the naval power of the Ottoman Empire was nearly completely destroyed by the united Spanish, Papal, and Venetian forces (Battle of Lepanto, October 7, 1571). In 1687 it was recaptured by the Venetians, but was again restored to the Ottomans in 1699, by the Treaty of Karlowitz. Among those who fought in the Battle of Lepanto was Miguel de Cervantes, the most famous Spanish writer; there is a statue located at the port, in his honour.

=== Modern history ===
Nafpaktos became part of independent Greece in March 1829. It was incorporated as a commune in 1912 and as an independent municipality in 1946. In the 1997 reform, Nafpaktos municipality was enlarged by the incorporation of 13 communes. In the 2010 reform, Nafpaktos municipality was merged with five other municipalities to form Nafpaktia municipality, and the town of Nafpaktos proper is now a communal district within the Nafpaktos municipal district of Nafpaktia municipality.

Naupactus suffered damage from the 2007 Greek forest fires.

== Ecclesiastical history ==
The metropolitan see of Naupactus depended on the pope of Rome until 733, when Leo III the Isaurian annexed it to the Patriarchate of Constantinople.

The zealous youth St. Nicholas of Trani after a failed attempt at the mortifications of cenobitic life at the Hosios Loukas monastery in Boetia set sail in the spring of 1094 on a pilgrimage to Rome for the Solemnity of Sts. Peter and Paul. His pious habit of evangelizing the sailors with constant proclamations (in Greek kerygma from κηρύσσω, meaning "to cry or proclaim as a herald") of the phrase Kyrie Eleison according to legend, led them to throw him overboard. He made it ashore in Italy, but was not hospitably received and died some months later aged just 19. Miraculous cures led to him being publicly acclaimed as worthy of veneration by the Bishop of Trani at the Council of Bari in 1098.

Under Frankish rule, there were about 20 archbishops in the 14–15th centuries. The city remains a titular see of the Roman Catholic church.

The see was attached to the Church of Greece after the Greek War of Independence. It was suppressed in 1900, replaced by the see of Acarnania and Naupactia, whose seat is at Missolonghi.

== Residents ==
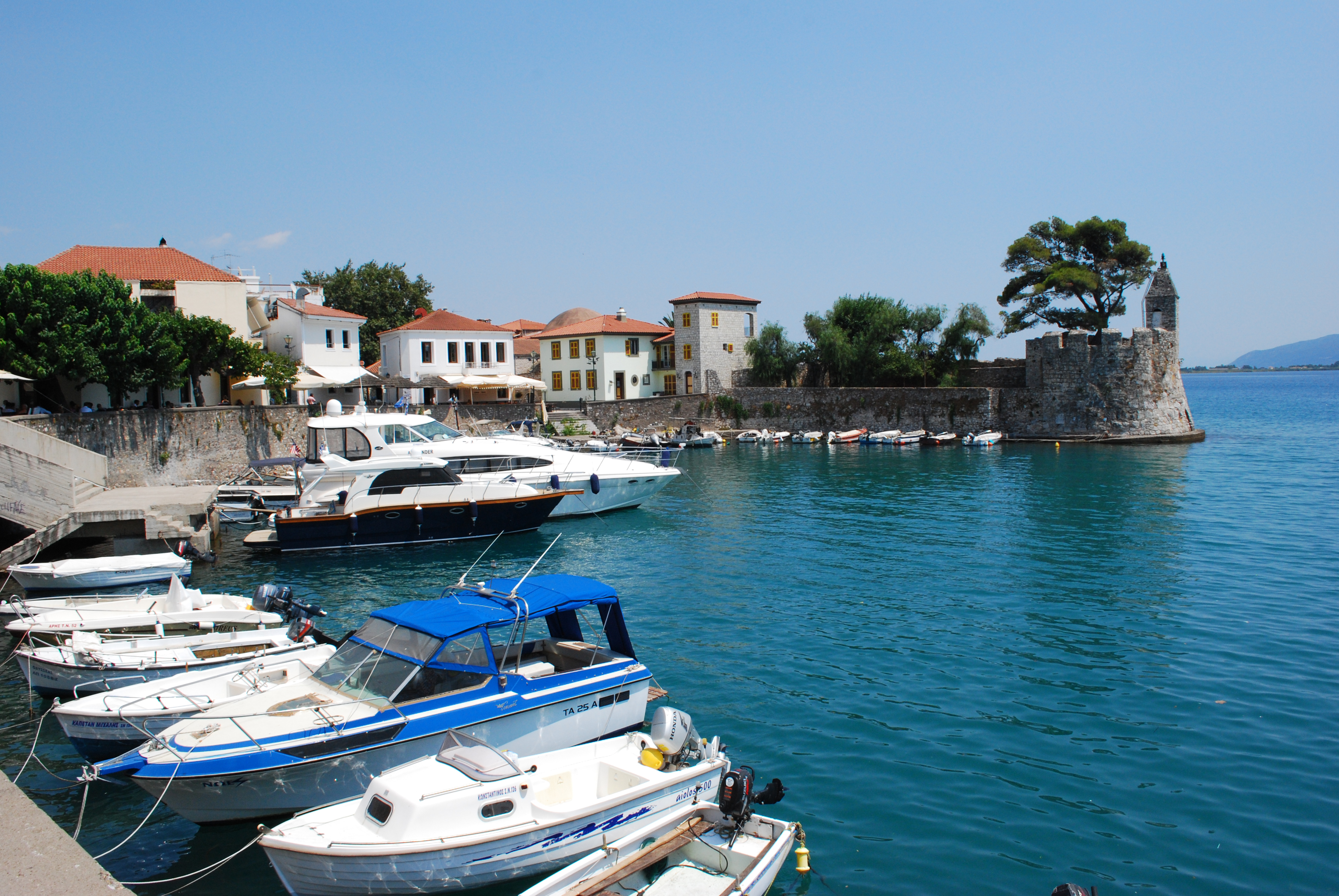
View of the port.

Today the population is about 19,768 people according to the 2011 census. Residential homes align with the Gulf of Corinth over a length of about 3 km (2 mi) and a width of about 1 km (0.6 mi). The port divides the beachfront in two parts. The Western part is called Psani, while the Eastern part Gribovo. Naupactus sits on a shoulder of a mountain range on the north while farmlands dominate the western part. The EO48 road passes through Nafpaktos, with the Thermopylae–Antirrio National Road (European route E65) bypassing the town to the north, at an elevation of 150 to 200 m (492 to 656 ft) above sea level. The bypass has contributed significantly in lowering the number of heavy trucks passing through the narrow streets of the town.

== Landmarks ==
- The port and castle provide the main attraction for the town, both with well kept Venetian vestiges. Shops, cafés and bars dot the immediate area, while two cafes are also located within the castle walls.
- The port also includes monuments commemorating the Battle of Lepanto (1571), and there is also a statue of Miguel de Cervantes by the Mallorcan artist Jaume Mir.
- Playgrounds can be found in Psani and Gribovo, along with a beach volleyball court (with spectator stands), and a soon-to-be-completed skateboard park.
- Nafpaktos is also home to a local museum.
- The Fethiye Mosque, the city's largest Ottoman-era mosque.

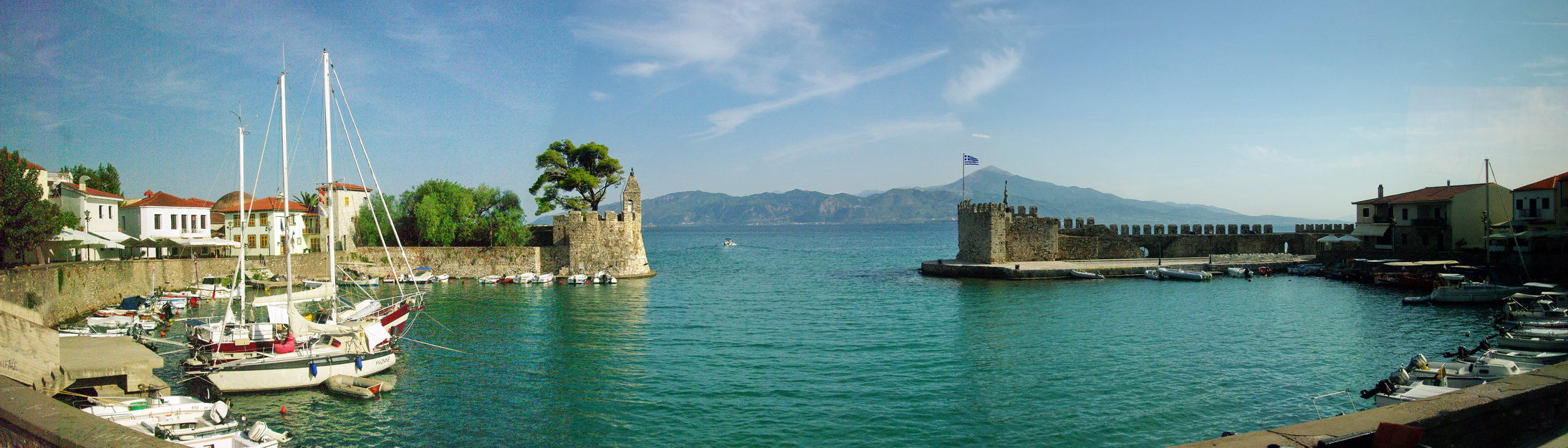
Panoramic view of the port.

== Subdivisions ==
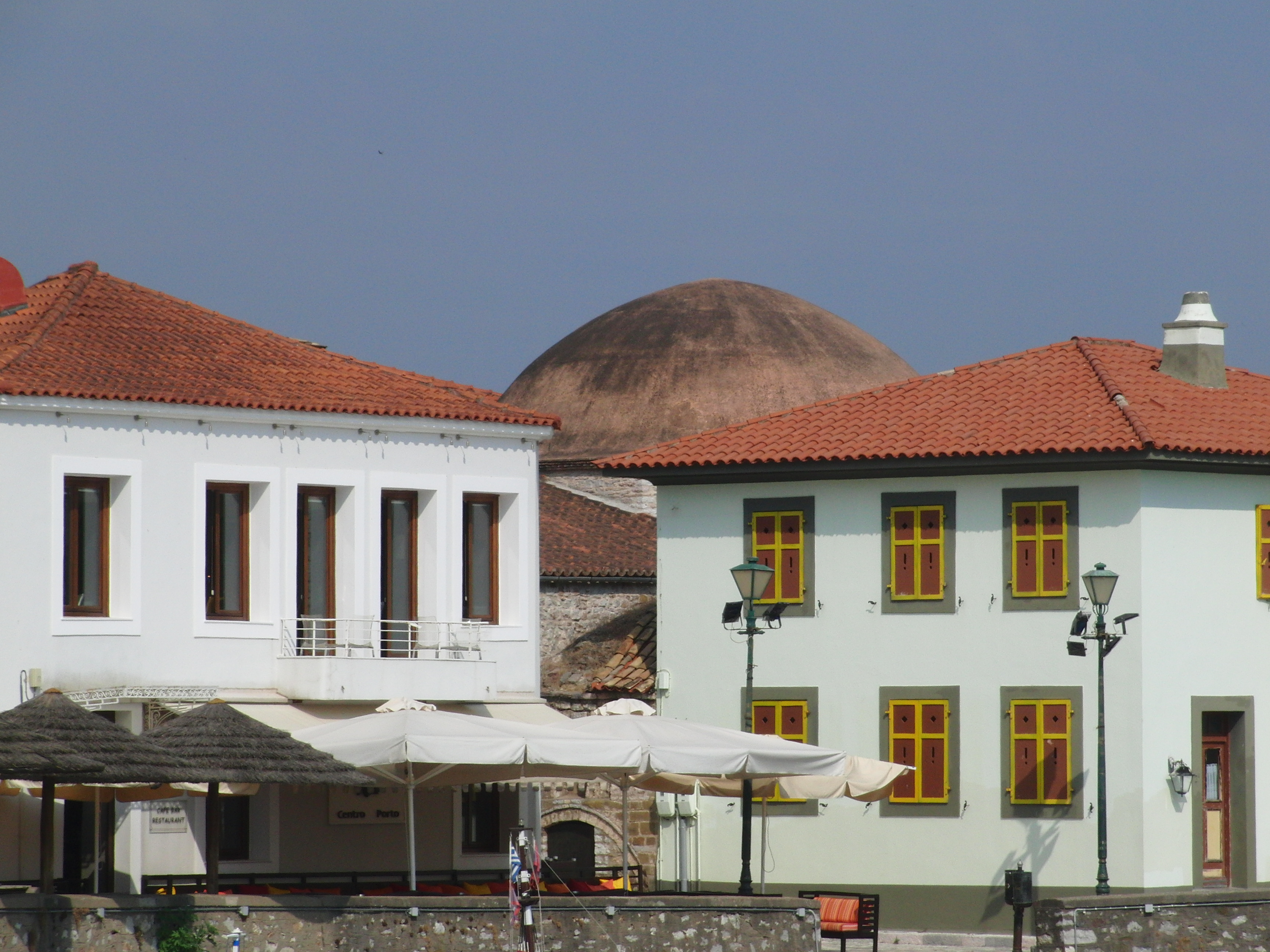
Houses by the port.

The municipal unit Nafpaktos is subdivided into the following communities (constituent villages in brackets):

- Afroxylia (Ano Afroxylia, Kato Afroxylia)
- Dafni (Dafni, Kato Dafni)
- Lygias
- Mamoulada (Kato Mamoulada, Mamoulada)
- Nafpaktos
- Neokastro (Neokastro, Paliampela)
- Palaiochoraki (Palaiochoraki, Mikro Palaiochoraki)
- Pitsinaiika (Pitsinaiika, Kastraki, Sykia)
- Riganio (Riganio, Diasello, Poros)
- Skala
- Velvina
- Vlachomandra (Vlachomandra, Gefyra Bania, Sfikaaika)
- Vomvokou (Vomvokou, Agios Vasileios, Lefka Vomvokous, Marmara)
- Xiropigado

== Nearest places ==
- Antirrio (west)
- Katafygio: One of the traditional villages in Mountainous Nafpaktia.
- Ano Chora (north): One of the traditional villages of Mountainous Nafpaktia
- Kentriki (north): One of the traditional villages of Mountainous Nafpaktia
- Aspria (north): One of the traditional villages of Mountainous Nafpaktia
- Chomori: One of the traditional villages of Mountainous Nafpaktia
- Elatovrisi: One of the traditional villages of Mountainous Nafpaktia with famous natural spring water.
- Skala: Village found in the hills minutes from the town centre; overlooks the town itself
- Skaloma: beaches
- Hiliadou: Part of the strip of beachside villages outside of Nafpaktos (Hiliadou-Monastiraki-Skaloma); sandy beach makes it a popular destination for residents of Nafpaktos and tourists
- Klepa: One of the villages in Mountainous Nafpaktia
- Platanos
- Ampelakiotissa: One of the traditional villages in Mountainous Nafpaktia
- Eleftheriani: Another one of the traditional villages of Mountainous Nafpaktia, which is renowned for its wonderful "Panegiri" a festival for Agia Paraskevi

== Historical population ==
Year	Town population	Municipal unit population
1981	9,012	–
1991	10,854	15,045
2001	12,924	18,231
2011	13,415	17,701
2021	12,950	17,154

== Media ==
=== Television ===
- Lepanto TV

== Notable people ==
- Agelaus (3rd century BC), politician
- John Apokaukos (died 1233), Metropolitan of Naupactus from 1200 to 1232
- Georgios Athanasiadis-Novas (1893–1987), lawyer, politician and former Prime Minister of Greece
- Evangelia Platanioti (1994), Olympic synchronized swimmer and reality TV contestant
- Alekos Fassianos (1935–2022), Greek painter
- Giannis Vlachogiannis (1867–1945), Greek historian and writer
- Stamatis Stamatiou (1881–1946), Greek journalist, author, cartoonist and politician

== Gallery ==
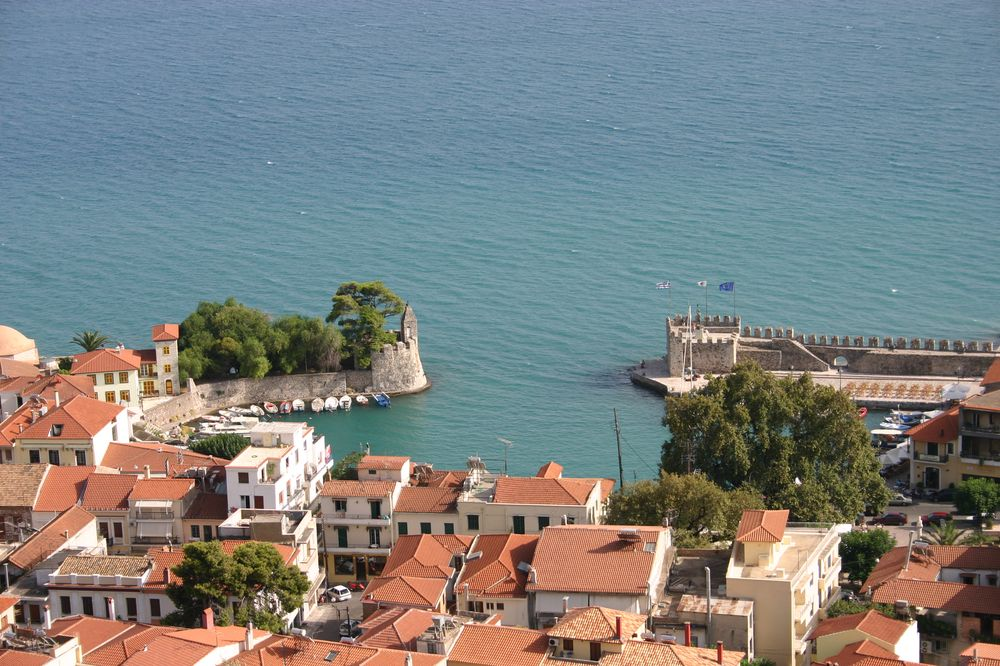
View from the fortress

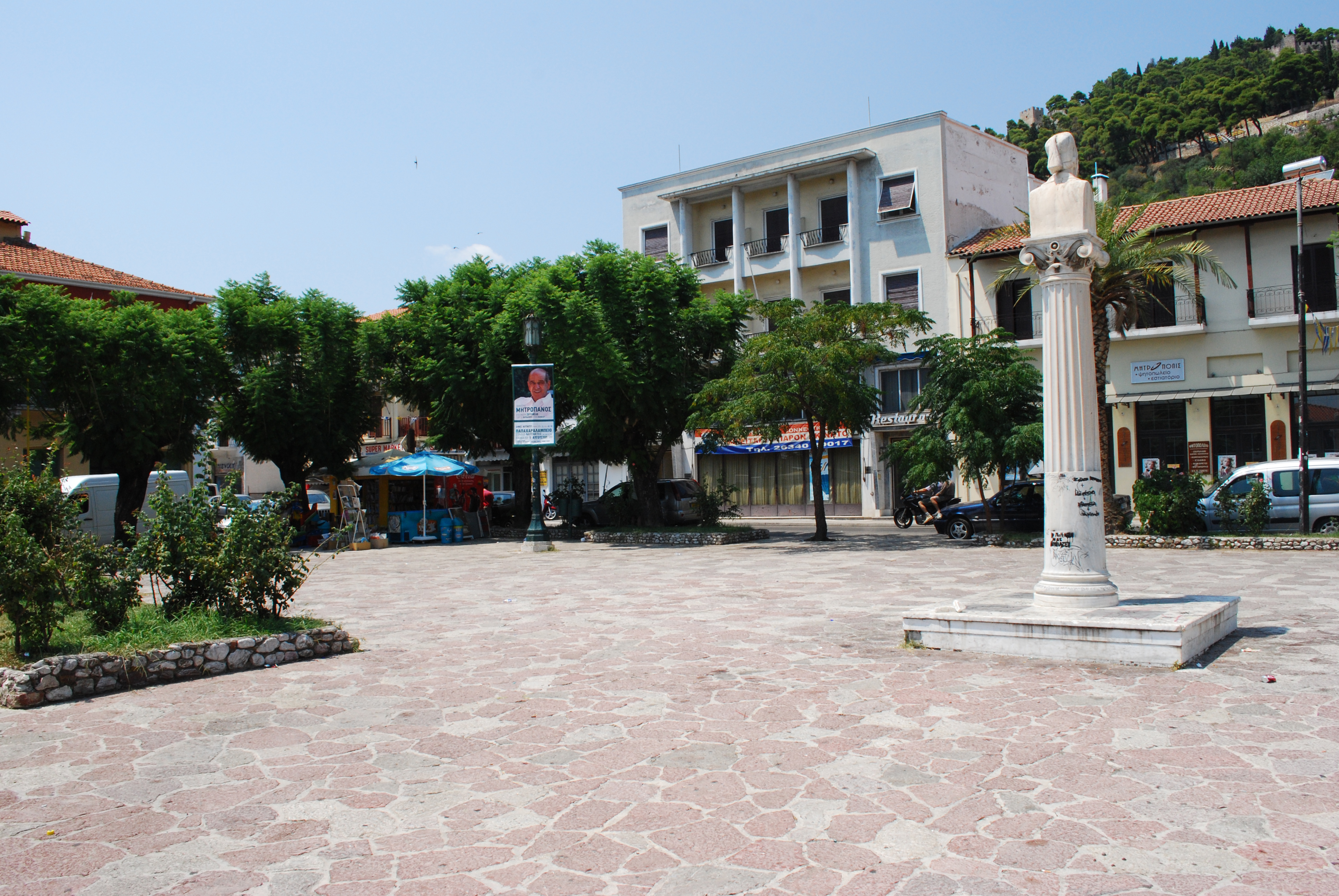
A square

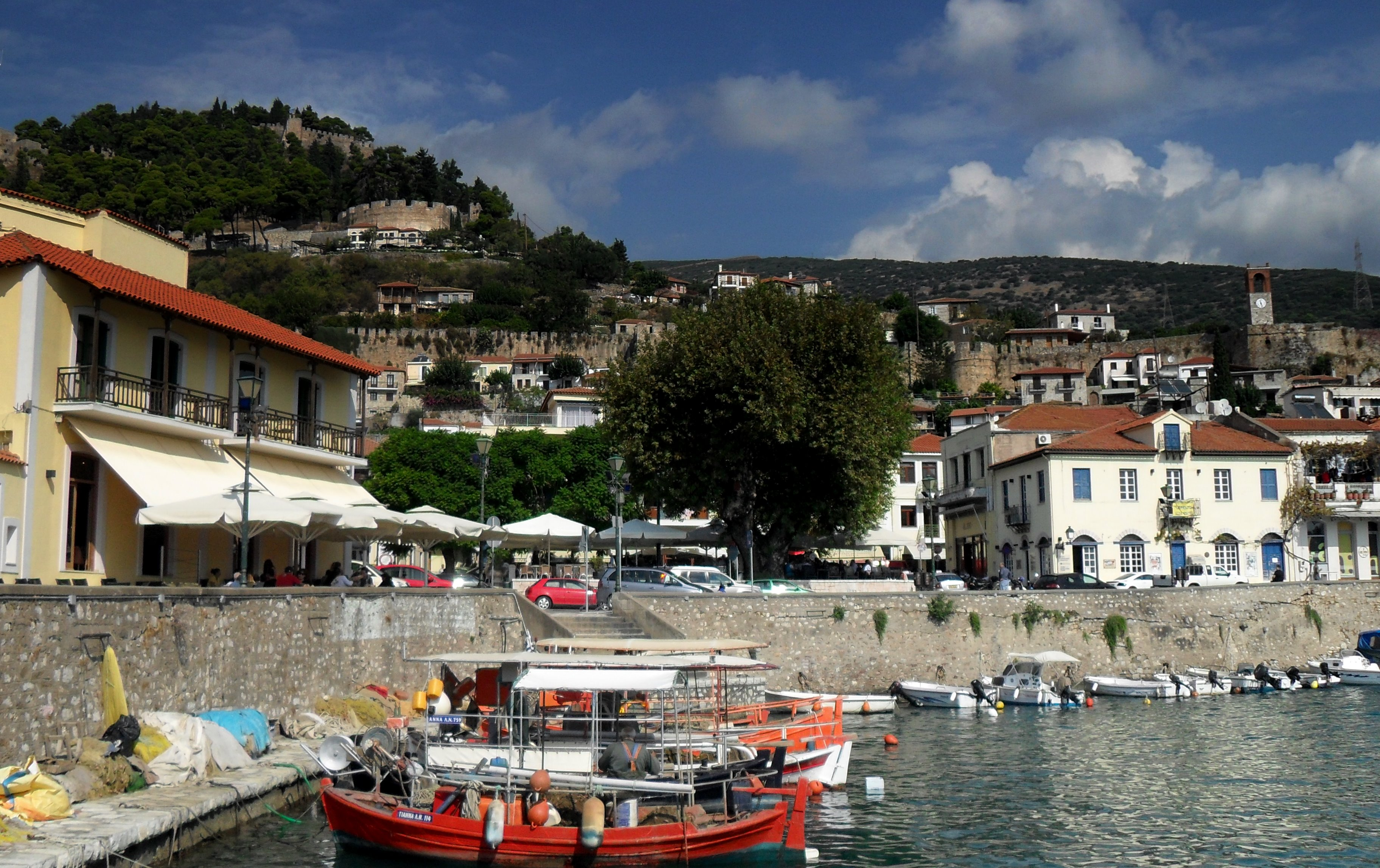
View from the port towards the fortress

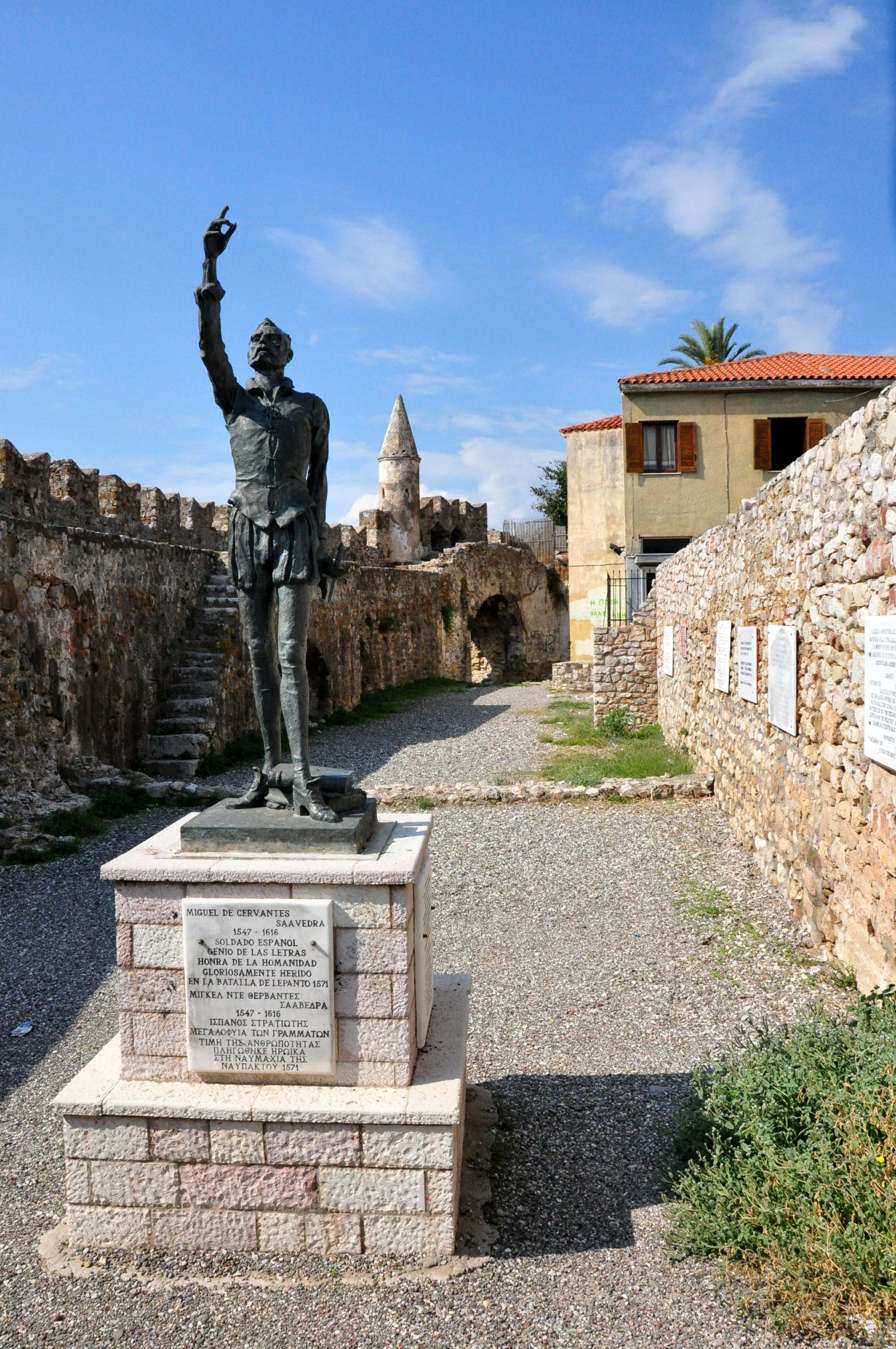
Statue of Miguel de Cervantes at the port (he took part at the Battle of Lepanto)

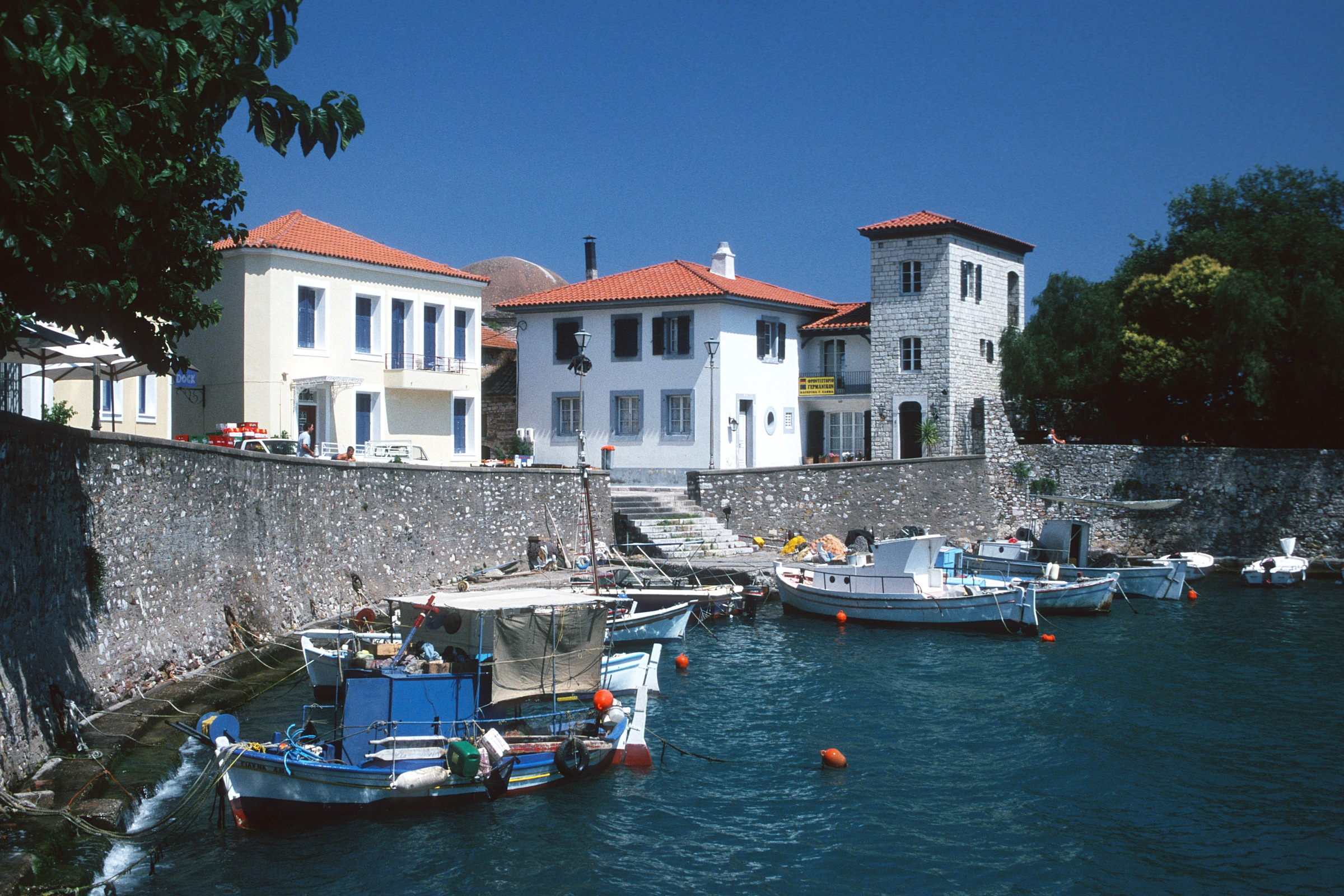
View of the old harbour

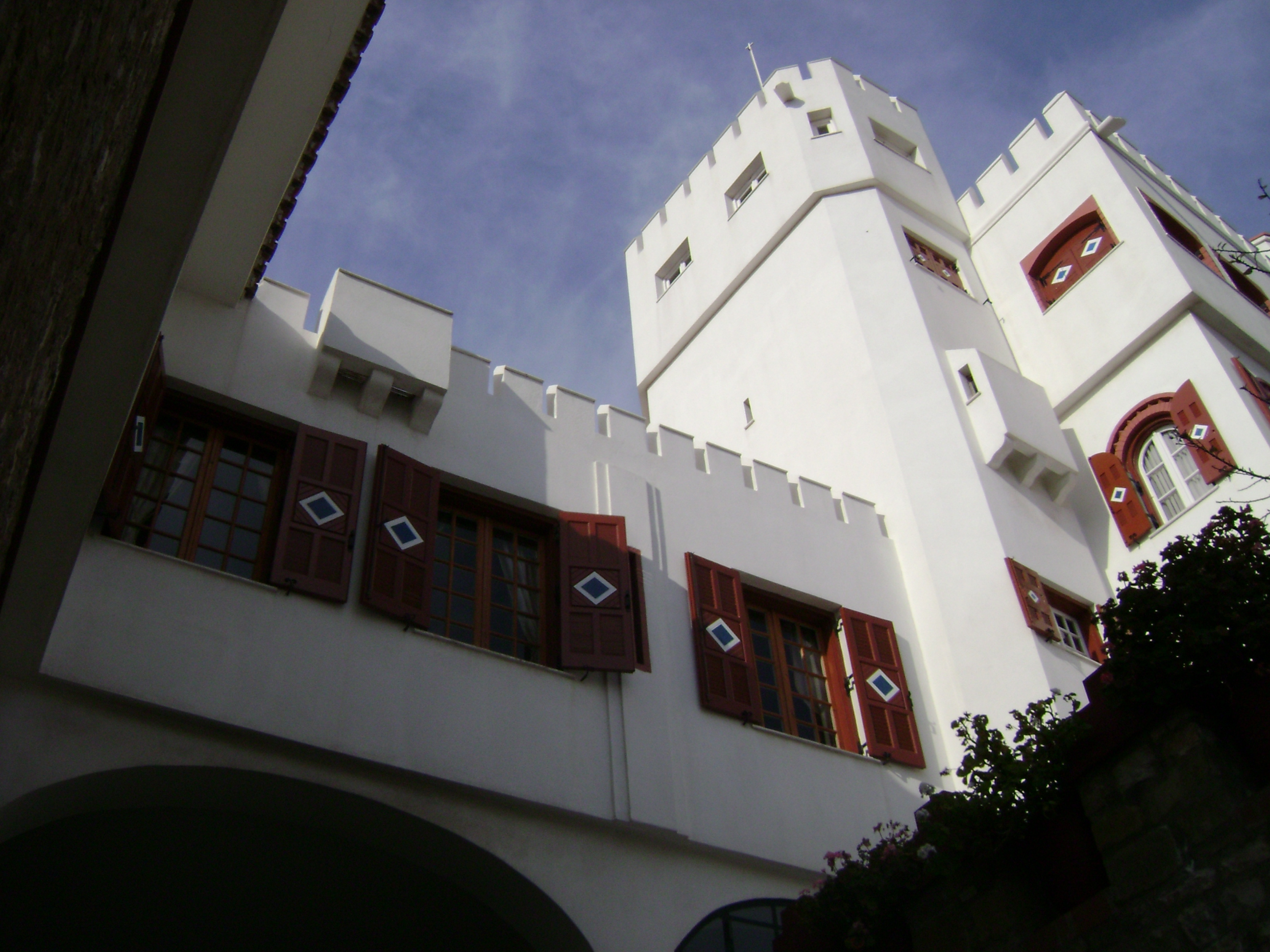
Botsaris tower museum

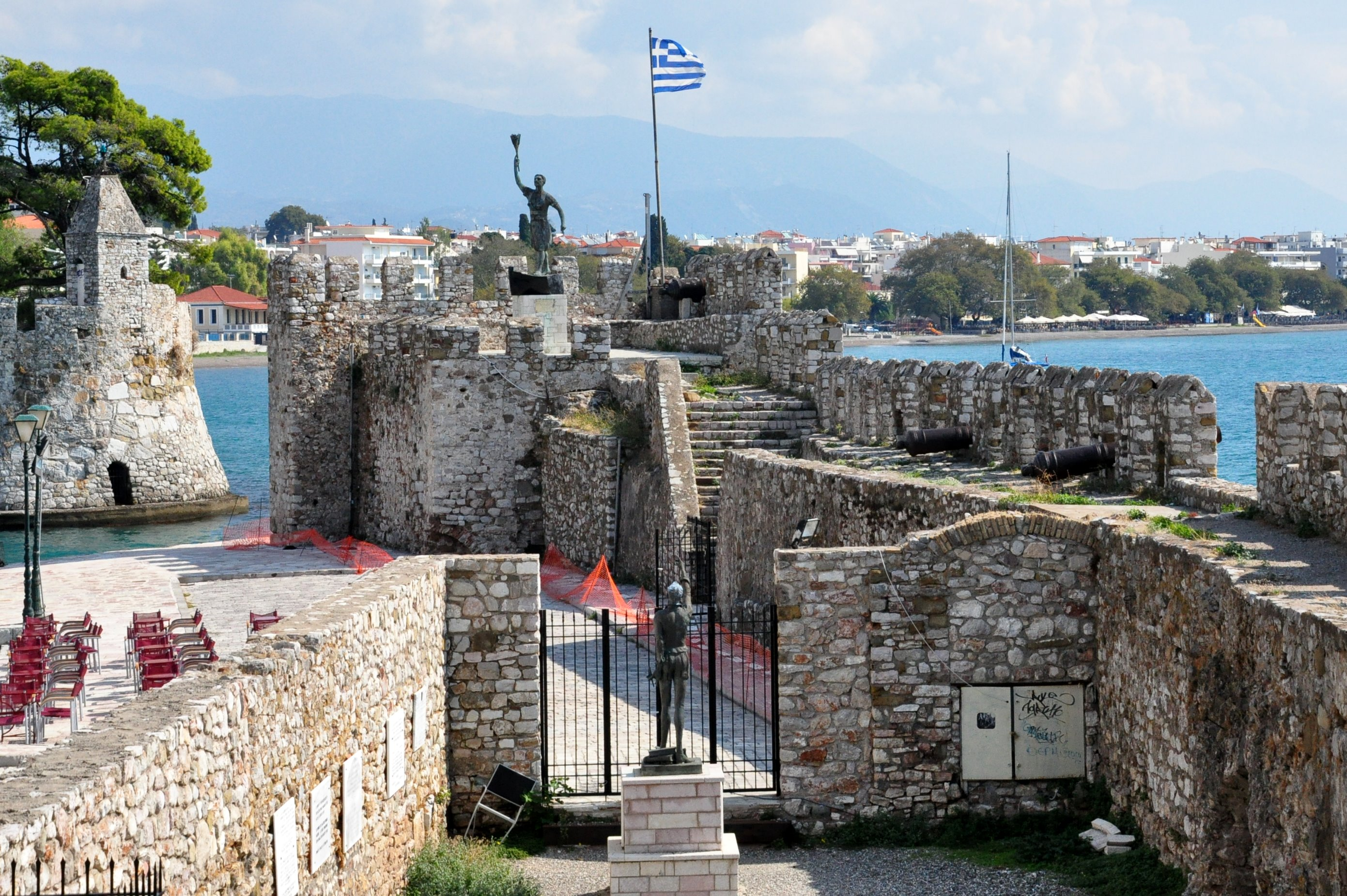
Fortifications of the port

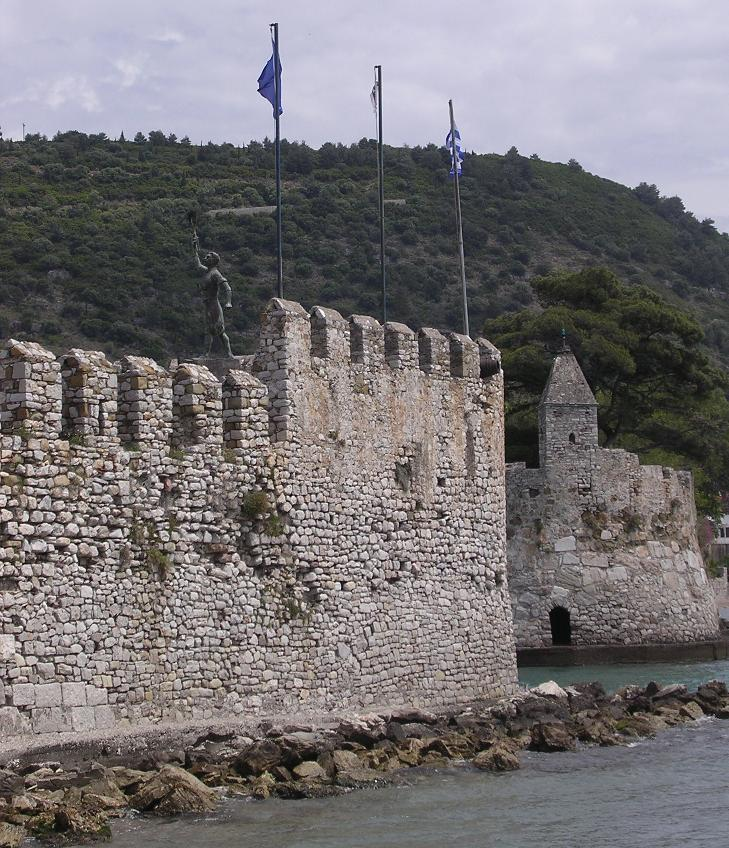
Fortifications along the sea wall

== International relations ==
Nafpaktos is twinned with:

- Cinque Terre, Italy
- Dubrovnik, Croatia
- Pontevedra, Spain

Note: the American town of Lepanto, Arkansas takes its name from the Battle of Lepanto rather than directly from the Greek town.

== Sports teams ==
- Nafpaktiakos Asteras F.C.

== See also ==
- List of settlements in Aetolia-Acarnania

== Sources ==
- This article incorporates text from a publication now in the public domain: Chisholm, Hugh, ed. (1911). "Naupactus". Encyclopædia Britannica. Vol. 19 (11th ed.). Cambridge University Press. pp. 278–279.
- Fine, John V. A. (1994) [1987]. The Late Medieval Balkans: A Critical Survey from the Late Twelfth Century to the Ottoman Conquest. Ann Arbor, Michigan: University of Michigan Press. ISBN 978-0-472-10079-8.
- Gregory, T. E. (1991). "Naupaktos". In Kazhdan, Alexander (ed.). The Oxford Dictionary of Byzantium. Oxford and New York: Oxford University Press. pp. 1442–1443. ISBN 0-19-504652-8.
- Nesbitt, John; Oikonomides, Nicolas, eds. (1994). Catalogue of Byzantine Seals at Dumbarton Oaks and in the Fogg Museum of Art, Volume 2: South of the Balkans, the Islands, South of Asia Minor. Vol. 2. Washington, DC: Dumbarton Oaks Research Library and Collection. ISBN 0-88402-226-9.
- Veikou, Myrto (2012). Byzantine Epirus: A Topography of Transformation. Settlements of the Seventh-Twelfth Centuries in Southern Epirus and Aetoloacarnania, Greece. BRILL. ISBN 978-9004221512.
