= Greek National Road 99 =

Trunk road in Greece

National Road 99
- Εθνική Οδός 99
- Route of the EO99 road, in blue

Route information
- Length: 5.56 km (3.45 mi)
- Existed: 9 July 1963–present

Major junctions
- North end: Heraklion
- South end: Knossos

Location
- Country: Greece
- Regions: Crete
- Primary destinations: Heraklion; Knossos

Highway system
- Highways in Greece; Motorways; National roads
← EO97	→ EO

Greek National Road 99 (Greek: Εθνική Οδός 99), abbreviated as the EO99, is a national road in central Crete. The EO99 runs between Heraklion and the archaeological site of Knossos, and is one of five national roads on the island.

== Route ==
The EO99 is officially defined as a north–south road within the Heraklion regional unit: the EO99 branches off the EO90 near the Port of Heraklion, and heads south towards Knossos, just outside the city. The EO99 also connects with the A90 motorway (formerly the New EO90), which bypasses central Heraklion.

== History ==
Ministerial Decision G25871 of 9 July 1963 created the EO99 from the old EO66, which existed by royal decree from 1955 until 1963, and followed the same route as the current EO99.
