= National roads in Greece =

Route classification in Greece

- Marker for the National Road 2 (EO2)

System information
- Formed: 28 June 1928 (original); 23 July 1963 (current)

Highway names
- National roads: EOx, EOxa

System links
- Highways in Greece; Motorways; National roads

National roads (Greek: Εθνική Οδός, romanized: Ethniki Odos) are a network of all-purpose trunk roads in Greece. They are less important than a motorway but more important than a provincial road. The layout of the national road network varies a lot, ranging from winding two-lane single carriageways to fast multi-lane dual carriageways: some of the latter are expressways (οδός ταχείας κυκλοφορίας, odos tacheias kykloforias) with motorway-like restrictions, but expressways in Greece are not limited to national roads.

The first known network of national roads in Greece was created in June 1928: the current network was defined in July 1963, and has been updated many times since then. Most national roads have route numbers that begin with "EO" in uppercase, non-continuously from EO1 to EO99, but most that were added later (such as Thessaloniki Inner Ring Road) have no number. Before the creation of the modern motorway network in July 1973, national roads were the most important type of roads for intercity travel in Greece.

== History ==
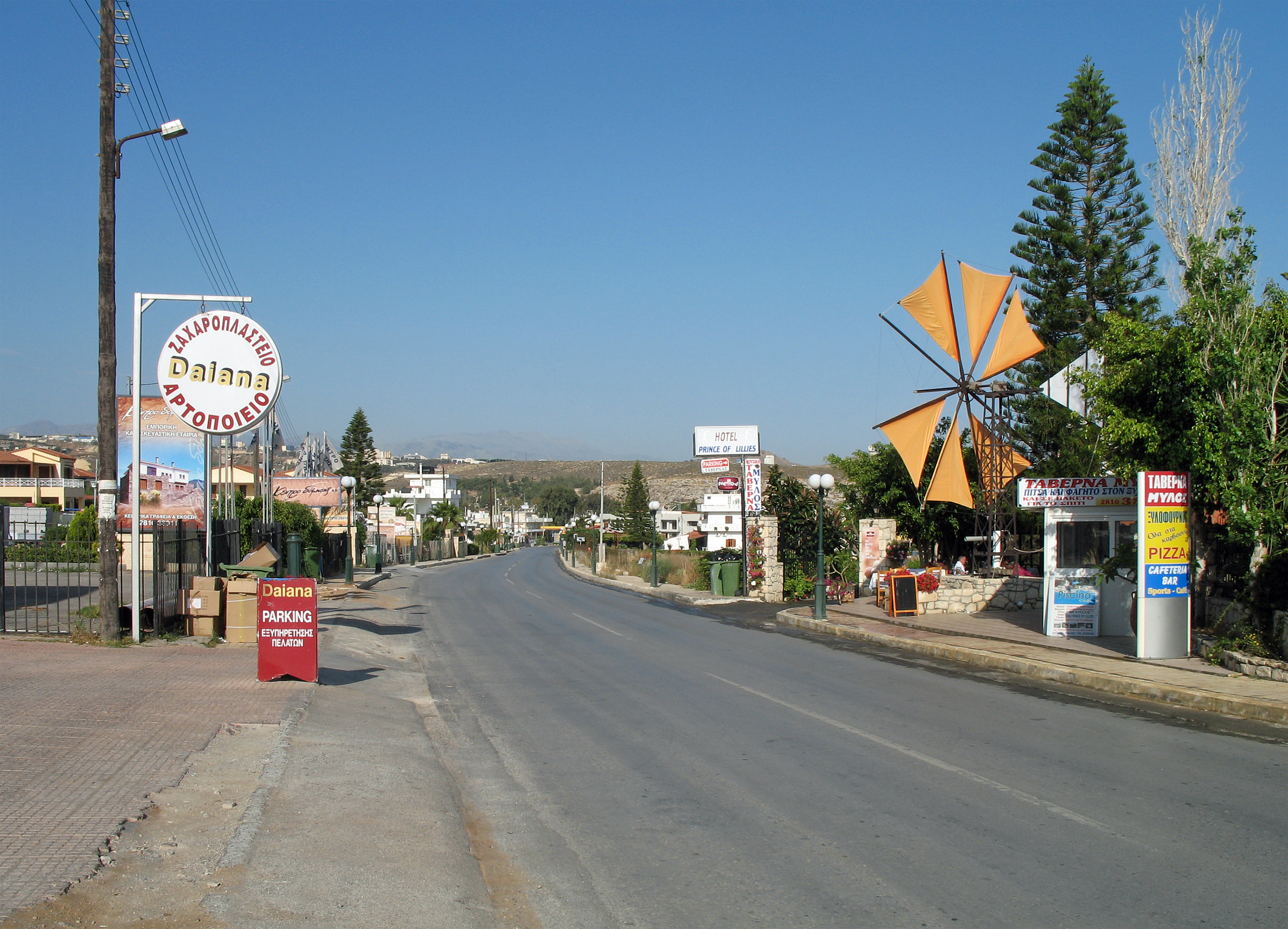
The EO90 near Heraklion, Crete

A presidential decree of 28 June 1928 created the first known national road network in Greece, consisting of roads numbered EO1 to EO198. The first network lasted until 9 August 1955, when a royal decree created the second network: the second network was the first to cover the current territory of Greece, and consisted of roads numbered EO1 to EO95. The second network was itself replaced by Ministerial Decision Γ25871 of 9 July 1963, which established the first 84 national roads of the current (third) network, numbered non-continuously from EO1 to EO99.

In 1995, additional sections of national road were added by Ministerial Decisions DMEO/e/oik/827 (for the islands), DMEO/e/oik/779 (for the Peloponnese), and DMEO/e/O/1308 (for the rest of Greece), although not all of them were numbered. The decrees also subdivided the national road network into three categories: basic, secondary and tertiary.

In 1998, the National Statistical Service of Greece (ESYE, now the Hellenic Statistical Authority) added more sections of national road, but the numbers in the list were for statistical purposes only.

== List of national roads ==
=== National Roads with a number ===
For national roads first introduced in 1963, destinations that did not appear in the original list (or were added later) are in italics: numbered national roads that were introduced after 1963 are highlighted in blue.

Road	Route	Notes	Ref.
EO1	Athens – Metamorfosi … Sfendali – Oinofyta … Longos – Kamena Vourla – Thermopylae … Lamia – Stylida – Almyros – Velestino – Larissa – Tempi – Leptokarya … Katerini – Alexandreia – Chalkidona – Gefyra – Polykastro – Evzonoi – Border with North Macedonia	The A1 replaced the Metamorfosi–Sfendali, Oinofyta–Martino–Atalanti–Longos, Thermopylae–Lamia and Leptokarya–Katerini sections of the EO1.	
EO1a	Agia Marina – Stylida – Achinos … Nikaia – Larissa … Thessaloniki (Palaio Stathmou)	The EO1a was not in the 1963 list: the A1 replaced almost all of the EO1a.	
EO2	Border with Albania (Krystallopigi) – Vatochori – Pisoderi – Florina – Edessa – Giannitsa – Chalkidona – Thessaloniki – Efkarpia … Lagyna – Lagkadikia – Amphipolis – Kavala – Toxotes – Xanthi – Lagos – Komotini – Mesi – Alexandroupolis – Feres – Ardani – Border with Turkey (Evros bridge)	The A2 replaced the Thessaloniki (Efkarpia)–Lagyna section of the EO2.	
EO3	Elefsina – Thebes – Livadeia – Bralos – Lamia – Farsala – Larissa – Elassona – Servia – Kozani … Mavrodendri – Ptolemaida – Vevi – Florina – Border with North Macedonia (Niki)	The A27 replaced the Kozani–Mavrodendri section of the EO3.	
EO4	Alexandreia – Veria – Kastanea – Polymylos – Kozani		
EO5	Rio – Antirrio – Missolonghi – Agrinio – Amfilochia – Arta – Filippiada – Ioannina		
EO6	Volos – Larissa – Trikala – Kalabaka – Mourgani bridge – Katara – Metsovo – Ioannina – Igoumenitsa		
EO7	Corinth – Nemea station – Argos – Tripoli – Megalopolis – Kalamata	The EO7 does not serve Nemea, but instead the former railway station of the same name.	
EO8	Athens – Corinth – Kiato – Derveni – Aigio – Rio – Patras		
EO8a	Elefsina (bypass) … Corinth (bypass) … Kastellokampos – Patras	The EO8a was not in the 1963 list: the A8 replaced almost all of the EO8a.	
EO9	Patras – Kato Achaia – Pyrgos – Kyparissia – Pylos – Methoni		
EO9a	Tsakona – Kalo Nero	The EO9a was not in the 1963 list.	
EO10	Isthmia – Kato Almyri – Nea Epidavros – Ancient Theatre of Epidaurus	The EO10 was not in the 1963 list.	
EO12	Lagyna (EO2) – Strymoniko … Mitrousi – Serres – Mesorrachi – Drama – Kavala	The A25 replaced the Strymoniko–Mitrousi section of the EO12.	
EO13	Katerini – Agios Dimitrios – Elassona (EO3)		
EO14	Drama (EO12) – Paranesti – Stavroupoli – Xanthi		
EO15	Mourgani bridge – Grevena – Siatista (Bara) – Neapoli – Kastoria – Trigono – Agios Germanos		
EO16	Thessaloniki – Arnaia – Ierissos		
EO16a	Agios Prodromos (EO16) – Polygyros	The EO16a used to branch off the EO16 at Palaiokastro.	
EO17	Ioannina – Dodoni		
EO19	Nicopolis (EO21) – Kanallaki – Paramythia – Neraida (Menina) – Filiates – Sagiada – Border with Albania (Mavromati)	Formerly the EO18 from 1963 to 1995, the EO19 was renumbered and extended from Neraida towards the border with Albania at Mavromati in 1995.	
EO20	Kozani – Siatista (Bara) – Neapoli – Tsotyli – Pentalofos – Eptachori – Konitsa – Kalpaki – Ioannina		
EO21	Filippiada – Preveza		
EO22	Kalpaki (EO20) – Border with Albania (Kakavia)		
EO24	Corfu – Palaiokastritsa		
EO25	Corfu – Achilleion (loop)	The southern end of the EO25 is a loop around Achilleon (Greek: Γύρος Άχιλλείου).	
EO26	Elassona – Deskati – Agiofyllo (EO15)		
EO27	Amfissa – Bralos		
EO28	Larissa Airport road		
EO29	Distomo (Steni) – Hosios Loukas		
EO30	Arta – Vourgareli – Trikala – Karditsa – Neo Monastiri – Farsala – Mikrothives – Nea Anchialos – Volos		
EO31	Aigio – Pteri – Kalavryta		
EO33	Patras – Tripotama – Levidi		
EO34	Volos – Neochori – Tsagkarada – Chorefto	The EO34 and EO34a run concurrently between Karavoma and Chorefto.	
EO34a	Volos – Portaria – Chorefto	The EO34 and EO34a run concurrently between Karavoma and Chorefto.	
EO35	Zakynthos – Keri		
EO36	Mytilene – Kalloni		
EO38	Lamia – Karpenisi – Agrinio – Thermo		
EO39	Tripoli – Sparta – Gytheio		
EO40	Agrinion Airport road		
EO42	Amfilochia – Vonitsa – Lefkada		
EO44	Thebes – Chalcis – Aliveri – Lepoura		
EO46	Tanagra Airport road		
EO48	Livadeia – Arachova – Delphi – Amfissa – Pentapoli (for Lidoriki) – Nafpaktos – Antirrio	In 1978, the EO48 was realigned away from Lidoriki, due to the creation of a reservoir.	
EO50	Argostoli – Sami		
EO51	Ardani – Didymoteicho – Orestiada – Kastanies – Border with Turkey	The road between Kastanies and the Bulgarian border at Ormenio is part of the unnumbered EO52.	
EO53	Alexandroupolis – Aisymi – Mega Dereio – Mikro Dereio	The EO53 from Mikro Dereio to the border with Bulgaria near Gorno Lukovo is unbuilt.	
EO54	Athens – Gerakas (Stavros) – Rafina		
EO55	Xanthi (EO14) – Echinos – Border with Bulgaria (Aegean Pass)	The road between Dimario and the border with Bulgaria opened on 20 January 2026.	
EO56	Athens – Piraeus		
EO57	Drama – Kato Nevrokopi – Border with Bulgaria (Exochi)		
EO58	Elefsina Airport road		
EO59	Mesorrachi – Amphipolis		
EO60	Megara Airport road		
EO62	Samos – Karlovasi Port		
EO63	Serres (EO12) – Melenikitsi … Melenikitsi – Sidirokastro – Neo Petritsi … Promachonas – Border with Bulgaria (Kulata)	The A25 replaced the Neo Petritsi–Promachonas section of the EO63, and left another gap at Melenikitsi.	
EO64	Kato Achaia – Araxos	According to the 1955 royal decree, the EO64 was an airport road for Araxos Airport, from 1955 to 1963.	
EO65	Diavata (EO2) – Kilkis – Drosato – Border with North Macedonia (Doirani) / Rodopoli – Strymonas bridge	The EO65 splits into two branches at Drosato: it was extended twice, from Kilkis to Rodopoli and the border with North Macedonia at Doirani in 1995, and from Rodopoli the bridge over the Strymonas near Neo Petritsi in 1998.	
EO66	Nemea station (EO7) – Nemea – Psari – Skoteini – Kandila – Levidi		
EO67	Thessaloniki Airport road		
EO68	Fichti – Mycenae		
EO69	Thasos (Limenas) – Limenaria		
EO70	Argos – Nafplio – Ancient Theatre of Epidaurus / Palaia Epidavros	The EO70 splits into two branches at Lygourio.	
EO71	Nea Anchialos Airport road		
EO72	Tripoli Airport road		
EO73	Thermi – Mytilene – Kratigos	The EO73 was not in the 1963 list.	
EO74	Tripoli – Levidi – Vytina – Olympia – Pyrgos		
EO75	Kallimasia – Chios – Kardamyla		
EO76	Megalopolis – Andritsaina – Temple of Apollo Epicurius		
EO77	Chalcis – Istiaia – Aidipsos		
EO78	Andravida Airport road		
EO79	Agios Merkourios – Skala Oropou		
EO80	Triodos (Aris) Airport road		
EO81	Agios Stefanos (Oeum) – Kapandriti – Kalamos – Amphiareion		
EO82	Sparta – Kalamata – Messini – Velika – Chatzis – Pylos		
EO83	Athens – Kifissia – Agios Stefanos (Oeum) – Marathon – Rafina		
EO84	Sparta – Mystras		
EO85	Rafina – Porto Rafti … Tzonima – Lavrio	The EO85 from Porto Rafti to Tzonima is unbuilt. The Register of National Roads claims that the EO85 continued on to Markopoulou, before following the EO89 to Lavrio.	
EO86	Dafni – Krokees – Molaoi – Monemvasia	The western end of the EO86 was later moved to Dafni.	
EO87	Pallini – Spata		
EO88	Rhodes (Maritsa) Airport road		
EO89	Gerakas (Stavros) – Lavrio – Sounion		
EO90	Kissamos (Kasteli) – Chania – Rethymno – Heraklion – Agios Nikolaos – Sitia		
EO91	Athens – Andrea Syngrou Avenue – Vouliagmeni – Sounion		
EO92	Kasteli Airport road		
EO94	Chania (Souda) Airport road		
EO95	Rhodes – Kolymbia – Lindos		
EO97	Heraklion – Phaistos – Agia Galini		
EO99	Heraklion – Knossos		

=== National Roads without a number ===
Sections of national roads with no official number were defined in 1995 and 1998: nearly all numbers that appeared in the 1998 Register of National Roads were used for statistical purposes only.

Road	Route	Notes	Ref.
EO	Ptolemaida – Vevi – Florina (new road)	ESYE number: EO3β	
EO	Koila (EO3) – Drepano (EO4)	ESYE number: EO3γ	
EO	Drepano (EO4) – Petrana (EO3)	ESYE number: EO4β	
EO	Vatero – Koila	ESYE number: EO20β	
EO	Thermopylae – Bralos … Chrisso – Itea – Nafpaktos – Antirrio	ESYE number: EO27α	
EO	Agios Nikolaos – Actium	ESYE number: EO42β	
EO	Chalcis – Vathy – Chalcis (via Euripus Bridge)	ESYE number: EO44β. The A11 replaced most of this road, between Schimatari and Vathy.	
EO	Kastanies – Ormenio – Border with Bulgaria	ESYE number: EO52	
EO	Liti (EO12) – Nea Santa	ESYE numbers: EO65β (Thessaloniki) and EO65γ (Kilkis)	
EO	Vouliagmenis Avenue	ESYE number: EO80	
EO	Vrysia – Airport	ESYE number: EO100	
EO	Igoumenitsa – Morfi – Preveza – Actium	ESYE number: EO102. The A52 replaced part of this road, between Actium and Vonitsa.	
EO	Fraxyla – Limpochoviti	ESYE number: EO102β	
EO	Amphipolis – Nea Peramos – Kavala	ESYE number: EO105	
EO	Nea Diagonios (Thessaloniki – Kalamaria)	ESYE number: EO105γ. The A24 replaced most of this road, between Kalamaria and Nea Moudania.	
EO	Larissa Southern Bypass	ESYE number: EO108	
EO	Thessaloniki Inner Ring Road	ESYE number: EO111	
EO	Arnissa – Antigonos (EO3)		
EO	Egaleo Ring Road	The A65 replaced almost all of this road.	
EO	Hymettus Ring Road (Argyroupoli – Papagou)	The A62 replaced part of this road, east of Papagou.	
EO	Kymis Avenue		
EO	Lamia Eastern Bypass		
EO	Piraeus – Drapetsona – Keratsini – Schisto – Skaramagas		

== Signage ==
Current national road marker

Old national road marker

National road markers consist of a blue rectangle with a white border and white numerals: the marker design is a recolour of the marker for the German Bundesstraße. The current design was introduced in 2003, as part of the Guidelines for the Design of Road Projects (Greek: Οδηγία Μελετών Οδικών Έργων, ΟΜΟΕ): it replaced the original design introduced in 1974, which consisted of a white shield with a blue border and blue numerals. Direction signs on national roads have a blue background, with yellow Greek text and white English text.

National roads markers rarely appeared on direction signs, which usually show just the destinations and distances. In 2003, the Guidelines for the Design of Road Projects provided for the use of national road markers on motorway direction signs.

== Historic EO111 road ==
From 28 June 1928 to 9 August 1955, the EO111 was a national road that ran between Tripoli and Lygies (south of Patras), via Levidi and Tripotama, with the section between Lygies and Patras being part of the EO103. The historic EO111 is today part of the EO33 and EO74, although the EO111 deviated from the route of the EO33 between Pangrataika Kalyvia and Tripotama, via Kleitoria and Aroania, instead of Paos: however, the EO111 is still used locally to refer to the national road between Tripoli and Patras.

== See also ==
- National roads to airports in Greece
- Highways in Greece
- International E-road network in Greece

== Bibliography ==
- Ministerial Decision DMEO/e/oik/827/1995 (in Greek), 4 August 1995 (FEK B' 735/28.08.1995, pp. 8800–8801). Archived from the original on 1 November 2025. Retrieved 1 November 2025.
- Ministerial Decision DMEO/e/oik/779/1995 (in Greek), 24 July 1995 (FEK B' 800/14.09.1995, pp. 9399–9400). Archived from the original on 1 November 2025. Retrieved 1 November 2025.
- Ministerial Decision DMEO/e/O/1308/1995 (in Greek), 15 December 1995 (FEK B' 30/19.01.1996, pp. 227–229). Archived from the original on 21 September 2025. Retrieved 28 October 2025.
- "Μητρώο Εθνικών Οδών" [Register of National Roads] (PDF) (in Greek). Athens: Hellenic Statistical Authority. 1998. pp. 13–20. Archived from the original (PDF) on 8 June 2019.
