= Greek National Road 81 =

Trunk road in Greece

Coordinates: 38.2644°N 23.8591°E

National Road 81
- Εθνική Οδός 81
- Route of the EO81 road, in blue

Route information
- Length: 24.7 km (15.3 mi)
- Existed: 9 July 1963–present

Major junctions
- South end: Agios Stefanos (Oeum)
- North end: Amphiareion

Location
- Country: Greece
- Regions: Attica
- Primary destinations: Agios Stefanos (Oeum); Kapandriti; Kalamos; Amphiareion

Highway system
- Highways in Greece; Motorways; National roads
← EO80	→ EO82

Greek National Road 81 (Greek: Εθνική Οδός 81), abbreviated as the EO81, is a single carriageway road in Attica, Greece. It connects the northern suburbs of Athens with Kalamos, near the north coast of Attica.

== Route ==
The EO81 is officially defined as a north–south route located within the East Attica regional unit. It branches off the EO83 at Agios Stefanos (Oeum) and heads north towards the Amphiareion, passing through Kapandriti and Kalamos. The EO81 runs parallel to the A1 motorway between Agios Stefanos and the settlement of Taxiarches.

== History ==
Ministerial Decision G25871 of 9 July 1963 created the EO81 from the old EO9, which existed by royal decree from 1955 until 1963, and followed the same route as the current EO81.
