= Greek National Road 89 =

Trunk road in Greece

Coordinates: 37.8562°N 23.9331°E

National Road 89
- Εθνική Οδός 89
- Route of the EO89 road, in blue

Route information
- Length: 53.3 km (33.1 mi)
- Existed: 9 July 1963–present

Major junctions
- North end: Gerakas (Stavros)
- South end: Sounion

Location
- Country: Greece
- Regions: Attica
- Primary destinations: Gerakas (Stavros); Lavrio; Sounion

Highway system
- Highways in Greece; Motorways; National roads
← EO88	→ EO90

Greek National Road 89 (Greek: Εθνική Οδός 89), abbreviated as the EO89, is a road in East Attica, Greece. It connects Gerakas with Sounio, via Koropi and Lavrio. Between Gerakas and Koropi it has lost importance after the opening of the A6 motorway. There are plans to upgrade the section between Koropi and Lavrio to motorway standards, by constructing junctions to replace the traffic lights and generally upgrading the road. This new road may carry the designation A61.

== Route ==
According to the Government Gazette in 1963, the EO89 runs from Stavros (near Gerakas) to Sounio, via Lavrio. The present alignment of the EO89 bypasses Koropi, Markopoulo, Keratea, although the original route ran through these settlements: in addition, the original alignment ran from Keratea to Lavrio via the hamlet of Plaka, instead of Dipseliza. The road continues to run through Glyka Nera and Paiania, as the A6 bypasses them.

The route currently has connections with:

- The EO54 at Stavros (Gerakas)
- The A6 and A64 at separate junctions near Koropi
- The EO85 at Keratea
- The EO91 at Sounio

== History ==
Ministerial Decision G25871 of 9 July 1963 created the EO89 from the old EO5, which existed by royal decree from 1955 until 1963, and followed the same route as the current EO89.

== Unrealised plans ==
Ministerial Decision DOY/oik/5776 of 4 December 2015 stated plans to extend the eastern end of the A6 motorway from Markopoulo to Lavrio, replacing parts of the EO89.
