= Greek National Road 87 =

Trunk road in Greece

National Road 87
- Εθνική Οδός 87
- Route of the EO87 road, in blue

Route information
- Length: 5.34 km (3.32 mi)
- Existed: 9 July 1963–present

Major junctions
- North end: Pallini
- South end: Spata

Location
- Country: Greece
- Regions: Attica
- Primary destinations: Pallini; Spata

Highway system
- Highways in Greece; Motorways; National roads
← EO86	→ EO88

Greek National Road 87 (Greek: Εθνική Οδός 87), abbreviated as the EO87, is a national road in East Attica, Greece. It is a local road that connects the town of Spata to the EO54.

== Route ==
According to the Government Gazette in 1963, the EO87 is a branch of EO54 from Pallini to Spata. According to the map of the national and provincial road network by the General Secretariat of Infrastructure (of the Ministry of Infrastructure and Transport) in April 2026, the EO87 heads south along the Ethnikis Antistaseos road from Pallini (the northern end), before heading south east along Spaton: the EO87 also crosses the A62 motorway, but does not connect with it.

== History ==
Ministerial Decision G25871 of 9 July 1963 created the EO87 from the old EO6, which existed by royal decree from 1955 until 1963, and followed the same route as the current EO87.
