= Greek National Road 97 =

Trunk road in Greece

Coordinates: 35.0792°N 24.9905°E

National Road 97
- Εθνική Οδός 97
- Route of the EO97 road, in blue

Route information
- Length: 69.3 km (43.1 mi)
- Existed: 9 July 1963–present

Major junctions
- North end: Heraklion
- South end: Agia Galini

Location
- Country: Greece
- Regions: Crete
- Primary destinations: Heraklion; Phaistos; Agia Galini

Highway system
- Highways in Greece; Motorways; National roads
← EO95	→ EO99

Greek National Road 97 (Greek: Εθνική Οδός 97), abbreviated as the EO97, is a national road on the island of Crete, Greece. It connects Heraklion with Agia Galini on the south coast, via Moires. It is one of five national roads on the island.

== Route ==
The EO97 is officially defined as a north–south road that is mostly within the Heraklion regional unit, with the southern end being in Rethymno: it branches off the EO90 in the city of Heraklion to the north, and heads southwest towards Agia Galini, via Phaistos. The EO97 also connects with the A90 motorway (formerly the New EO90), which bypasses central Heraklion.

== History ==
Ministerial Decision G25871 of 9 July 1963 created the EO97 from the old EO67, which existed by royal decree from 1955 until 1963, and followed the same route as the current EO97.
