= Greek National Road 86 =

Trunk road in Greece

Coordinates: 36.8602°N 22.7008°E

National Road 86
- Εθνική Οδός 86
- Route of the EO86 road, in blue

Route information
- Length: 69.7 km (43.3 mi)
- Existed: 9 July 1963–present

Major junctions
- West end: Dafni
- East end: Monemvasia

Location
- Country: Greece
- Regions: Peloponnese
- Primary destinations: Dafni; Krokees; Molaoi; Monemvasia

Highway system
- Highways in Greece; Motorways; National roads
← EO85	→ EO87

National Road 86 (Greek: Εθνική Οδός 86), abbreviated as the EO86, is a national road in the Peloponnese region of Greece. The EO86 was created in 1963, and currently runs from Dafni (south of Sparta) to Monemvasia.

== Route ==
The EO86 is a branch of the EO39 that runs through the Laconia regional unit, from Dafni in the west to Monemvasia in the east, via Krokees and Molaoi. Ministerial Decision G25871 of 9 July 1963 described Krokees as the original western end of the EO86: however, the construction of a bypass north of Krokees, using sections of Laconia Provincial Road 24, resulted in the western end of the EO86 being moved up to Dafni, according to the map of the national and provincial road network by the General Secretariat of Infrastructure (of the Ministry of Infrastructure and Transport) in April 2026.

== History ==
Ministerial Decision G25871 of 9 July 1963 created the EO86 from the short-lived EO62, which existed under a royal decree from 9 August 1955 to 9 July 1963, and followed the same route as the current EO86.
