= Greek National Road 77 =

Trunk road in Greece

Coordinates: 38.8362°N 23.4163°E

National Road 77
- Εθνική Οδός 77
- Route of the EO77 road, in blue

Route information
- Length: 146.4 km (91.0 mi)
- Existed: 9 July 1963–present

Major junctions
- South end: Chalcis
- North end: Aidipsos

Location
- Country: Greece
- Regions: Central Greece
- Primary destinations: Chalcis; Istiaia; Aidipsos

Highway system
- Highways in Greece; Motorways; National roads
← EO76	→ EO78

Greek National Road 77 (Greek: Εθνική Οδός 77), abbreviated as the EO77, is a national road on the island of Euboea, Greece. It connects Chalcis with Aidipsos, via Agia Anna and Istiaia.

== Route ==
The EO77 is officially defined as a north–south route located entirely within the island of Euboea: it runs between Chalcis in the south and Aidipsos in the north, passing through Istiaia further up north. The EO77 connects with the EO44 in central Chalcis.

== History ==
Ministerial Decision G25871 of 9 July 1963 created the EO77 from the old EO12, which existed by royal decree from 1955 until 1963, and followed the same route as the current EO77.
