= Greek National Road 91 =

Trunk road in Greece

National Road 91
- Εθνική Οδός 91
- Route of the EO91 road, in blue

Route information
- Length: 68.1 km (42.3 mi)
- Existed: 9 July 1963–present

Major junctions
- North end: Athens
- South end: Sounion

Location
- Country: Greece
- Regions: Attica
- Primary destinations: Athens; Andrea Syngrou Avenue; Vouliagmeni; Sounion

Highway system
- Highways in Greece; Motorways; National roads
← EO90	→ EO92

Greek National Road 91 (Greek: Εθνική Οδός 91), abbreviated as the EO91, is a national road in Attica, Greece. The EO91 runs along the western face of the Attica peninsula, from Athens to Sounion.

== Route ==
The EO91 is officially defined as a north–south coastal road in Attica. From Athens in the north, the road travels southwest along Andrea Syngrou Avenue towards Palaio Faliro: from there, the EO91 follows the coast of the Saronic Gulf to Sounion in the south, passing through Vouliagmeni. The Athens Tram runs parallel to the EO91, from Palaio Faliro to Glyfada.

The EO91 connects with the EO1, EO54 and Vouliagmenis Avenue in Athens, and the EO89 at Sounion.

== History ==
The EO91 was first created by a Presidential Decree of 28 June 1928: from 9 August 1955 until 9 July 1963, the road was numbered the EO3, without any change to the route.

== See also ==
- Poseidonos Avenue
