= Greek National Road 62 =

Trunk road in Greece

National Road 62
- Εθνική Οδός 62
- Route of the EO62 road, in blue

Route information
- Length: 32.6 km (20.3 mi)
- Existed: 9 July 1963–present

Major junctions
- East end: Samos
- West end: Karlovasi Port

Location
- Country: Greece
- Regions: North Aegean
- Primary destinations: Samos; Karlovasi Port

Highway system
- Highways in Greece; Motorways; National roads
← EO60	→ EO63

Greek National Road 62 (Greek: Εθνική Οδός 62), abbreviated as the EO62, is a national road in the island of Samos. The road runs between the town of Samos and Karlovasi, and is one of four national roads in the North Aegean region.

== Route ==
The EO62 is officially defined as an east–west national road in the island of Samos: the road runs along the northern coast of the island, from town of Samos in the east, to the Port of Karlovasi in the west.

== History ==
Ministerial Decision G25871 of 9 July 1963 created the EO62 from the old EO72, which existed by royal decree from 1955 until 1963, and followed the same route as the current EO62.
