= Greek National Road 54 =

Trunk road in Greece

National Road 54
- Εθνική Οδός 54
- Route of the EO54 road, in blue

Route information
- Length: 26.7 km (16.6 mi)
- Existed: 9 July 1963–present

Major junctions
- West end: Athens
- East end: Rafina

Location
- Country: Greece
- Regions: Attica
- Primary destinations: Athens; Gerakas (Stavros); Rafina

Highway system
- Highways in Greece; Motorways; National roads
← EO53	→ EO55

Greek National Road 54 (Greek: Εθνική Οδός 54), abbreviated as the EO54, is a national road in Greater Athens and Athens metropolitan area in Attica, Greece.

== Route ==
According to the Government Gazette in 1963, the EO54 runs from central Athens to Rafina, via Stavros (near Gerakas).

The route currently has connections with:

- The EO1 and EO91 at Syntagma Square
- Both ends of the EO83 at Ampelokipoi and Rafina
- The EO89 at Stavros (Gerakas)
- The EO87 and the A6 at separate junctions at Pallini
- The EO85 at Rafina

== History ==
Ministerial Decision G25871 of 9 July 1963 created the EO54 from part of the old EO4 between Athens and Rafina, which existed by royal decree from 1955 until 1963.
