= Greek National Road 44 =

Road in Greece

Coordinates: 38.4019°N 23.8051°E

National Road 44
- Εθνική Οδός 44
- Route of the EO44 and Chalcis–Vathy–Chalcis national roads, in blue
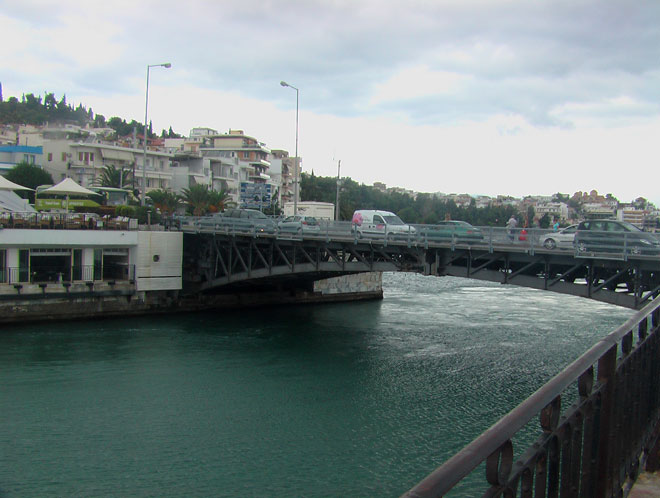
- The EO44 crossing the old bridge at Chalcis

Route information
- Length: 90.0 km (55.9 mi)
- Existed: 9 July 1963–present

Major junctions
- West end: Thebes
- East end: Lepoura

Location
- Country: Greece
- Regions: Central Greece
- Primary destinations: Thebes; Chalcis; Aliveri; Lepoura

Highway system
- Highways in Greece; Motorways; National roads
← EO42	→ EO46

Greek National Road 44 (Greek: Εθνική Οδός 44), abbreviated as the EO44, is a national road in central Greece. The road connects the mainland with the island of Euboea, running between Thebes and Lepoura, via Chalcis.

== Route ==
The EO44 is officially defined as a 90.0-kilometre (55.9-mile) long east-west road within the region of Central Greece, linking the mainland with the island of Euboea. From Thebes in the west, the road heads east towards Chalcis, where it crosses the Euripus Strait via the old bridge (and not the newer Euripus Bridge): it then heads towards Lepoura in the east, passing through Vasiliko and Aliveri.

The EO44 connects with the A1 motorway near Ritsona, the EO3 in Thebes, and both the EO77 and Chalcis–Vathy–Chalcis National Road in Chalcis.

== History ==
Ministerial Decision G25871 of 9 July 1963 created the EO44 from the old EO11 and EO13, both of which existed by royal decree from 1955 until 1963: the old EO11 followed the same route as the current EO44 between Thebes and Chalcis, while the old EO13 followed the same route between Chalkida and Lepoura.

== Chalcis–Vathy–Chalcis National Road ==
The Chalcis–Vathy–Chalcis National Road (Greek: Εθνική Οδός Χαλκίδας - Βαθέος - Χαλκίδας) is an unnumbered, V-shaped branch of the EO44 in Chalcis, bypassing the city to the south via Euripus Bridge. The branch was created by Ministerial Decision DMEO/e/O/1308 of 15 December 1995, originally as a Y-shaped road between Schimatari and the western and eastern sides of Chalcis, but the A11 motorway later replaced the road between Schimatari and Vathy. The Chalcis–Vathy–Chalcis National Road is 7.96 kilometres (4.95 miles) long, and was numbered the EO44β for statistical purposes by the National Statistical Service of Greece (ESYE) in 1998.
