= Greek National Road 84 =

Trunk road in Greece

National Road 84
- Εθνική Οδός 84
- Route of the EO84 road, in blue

Route information
- Length: 5.71 km (3.55 mi)
- Existed: 9 July 1963–present

Major junctions
- East end: Sparta
- West end: Mystras

Location
- Country: Greece
- Regions: Peloponnese
- Primary destinations: Sparta; Mystras

Highway system
- Highways in Greece; Motorways; National roads
← EO83	→ EO85

National Road 84 (Greek: Εθνική Οδός 84), abbreviated as the EO84, is a national road in the Peloponnese region of Greece. The EO84 is a short road that connects the fortified town of Mystras to the Greek national road network.

== Route ==
The EO84 is officially defined as a short east–west road in the Laconia regional unit, branching off the EO82 in Sparta and heading west towards the fortified town of Mystras, passing through Palaiologio and New Mystras.

== History ==
Ministerial Decision G25871 of 9 July 1963 created the EO84 from the old EO77, which existed by royal decree from 1955 until 1963, and followed the same route as the current EO84.
