= Greek National Road 95 =

Trunk road in Rhodes, Greece

Coordinates: 36.2625°N 28.1443°E

National Road 95
- Εθνική Οδός 95
- Route of the EO95 road, in blue

Route information
- Length: 48.2 km (30.0 mi)
- Existed: 9 July 1963–present

Major junctions
- North end: Rhodes
- South end: Lindos

Location
- Country: Greece
- Regions: South Aegean
- Primary destinations: Rhodes; Kolymbia; Lindos

Highway system
- Highways in Greece; Motorways; National roads
← EO94	→ EO97

Greek National Road 95 (Greek: Εθνική Οδός 95), abbreviated as the EO95, is a national road in the island of Rhodes, Greece. The EO95 runs from the city of Rhodes (the easternmost point of the Greek national road network) to the village of Lindos.

== Route ==
The EO95 is officially defined as a north–south road in the island of Rhodes: the road is about 48.2 kilometres (30.0 miles) long, and runs between the city of Rhodes to the north and Lindos to the south, passing through Vrysia and Kolymbia. The Vrysia–Airport National Road branches off the EO95 at Vrysia, and heads west towards Rhodes International Airport.

At the time when the EO95 was created (in 1963), the road was narrow and curvy, as shown in purple on the map of the national and provincial road network by the General Secretariat of Infrastructure (of the Ministry of Infrastructure and Transport) in April 2026: today, most of the road between Rhodes and Kolymbia is a dual carriageway, with one grade-separated interchange at Afantou.

== History ==
Ministerial Decision G25871 of 9 July 1963 created the EO95 from the old EO68, which existed by royal decree from 1955 until 1963, and followed the same basic route as the current EO95.

== Future plans ==
In June 2018, the South Aegean region proposed upgrading the EO95 between Kolymbia and Lindos: the plans included converting most of the road into a dual carriageway with grade separated interchanges, and realigning the road around the Tsambika monastery (located halfway between Kolymbia and Archangelos).
