= Greek National Road 63 =

Road in Greece

National Road 63
- Εθνική Οδός 63
- Route of the EO63 road, in blue

Route information
- Part of E79 (near Promachonas)
- Length: 28.3 km (17.6 mi)
- Existed: 9 July 1963–present

Major junctions
- South end: Serres
- North end: Border with Bulgaria (Kulata)

Location
- Country: Greece
- Regions: Central Macedonia
- Primary destinations: Serres; Sidirokastro; Border with Bulgaria (Kulata)

Highway system
- Highways in Greece; Motorways; National roads
← EO62	→ EO64

Greek National Road 63 (Greek: Εθνική Οδός 63), abbreviated as the EO63, is a national road in northern Greece. The EO63 originally ran from Serres to the border with Bulgaria near Promachonas, but parts of the road have been replaced by the A25 motorway. A small section of EO63 near Promachonas is part of European route E79.

== Route ==
The EO63 is officially defined as a north–south route within the Serres regional unit: the road runs between Serres and the border with Bulgaria near Kulata, via Sidirokastro. However, the A25 motorway has replaced the EO63 for a short section near Melenikitsi, as well as between Neo Petritsi and Promachonas: for the latter, this means that non-motorway traffic must detour via Serres provincial roads 28 and 35 to reach Promachonas.

Aside the A25, the EO63 also connects with the EO12 near Serres, and the EO65 near Neo Petritsi: at the border, the road meets the Bulgarian A3 motorway (which heads north towards Sofia). The northern section near Promachonas is also part of European route E79, and is partially tolled (with the toll station at coordinates 41.364260°N 23.356785°E).

== History ==
Ministerial Decision G25871 of 9 July 1963 created the EO63 from the old EO43, which existed by royal decree from 1955 until 1963, and followed the same route as the current EO63. Border controls with Bulgaria, at the northern end of the National Road, were abolished on 1 January 2025 when Bulgaria fully joined the Schengen Area.
