= Greek National Road 85 =

Trunk road in Greece

National Road 85
- Εθνική Οδός 85
- Route of the EO85 road, in blue

Route information
- Length: 34.1 km (21.2 mi)
- Existed: 9 July 1963–present

Major junctions
- North end: Rafina
- South end: Lavrio

Location
- Country: Greece
- Regions: Attica
- Primary destinations: Rafina; Porto Rafti; Lavrio

Highway system
- Highways in Greece; Motorways; National roads
← EO84	→ EO86

Greek National Road 85 (Greek: Εθνική Οδός 85), abbreviated as the EO85, is a partially complete national road in Attica, Greece. The EO85 runs along the eastern face of the Attica peninsula, from Rafina to Lavrio, with a gap between Porto Rafti and Tzonima.

== Route ==
Ministerial Decision G25871 of 9 July 1963 defines the EO85 as a north–south coastal road in Attica, travelling along the east coast of the Attica peninsula from Rafina in the north to Lavrio in the south, via Porto Rafti. The EO85 connects with the EO54 in Rafina, and the EO89 at Lavrio.

However, the section between Porto Rafti and the village of Tzonima is unbuilt: the Register of National Roads, published in 1998 by the National Statistical Service of Greece (ESYE), claims that the EO85 continued west from Porto Rafti to Markopoulou, before following the EO89 to Lavrio, but the map of the national and provincial road network by the General Secretariat of Infrastructure (of the Ministry of Infrastructure and Transport) simply shows a gap between Porto Rafti and Tzonima.

== History ==
Ministerial Decision G25871 of 9 July 1963 created the EO85 from part of the old EO4 between Rafina and Lavrio, which existed by royal decree from 1955 until 1963.
