= A11 motorway (Greece) =

Motorway in Greece

A11 motorway
- Αυτοκινητόδρομος Α11
- Route of the A11 motorway, in green

Route information
- Length: 10 km (6.2 mi)

Major junctions
- South end: Schimatari (A1)
- North end: Chalcis

Location
- Country: Greece
- Regions: Central Greece
- Primary destinations: Schimatari; Chalcis

Highway system
- Highways in Greece; Motorways; National roads
← A1	→ A2

The A11 motorway (Greek: Αυτοκινητόδρομος Α11) is a branch of the A1 motorway in Greece, connecting it with the city of Chalcis. It starts at Schimatari and ends at Euripus Bridge at the city of Chalcis.

== Route ==
Ministerial Decision DOY/oik/5776 of 4 December 2015 describes the A11 motorway as a branch of the A1, running from Schimatari in the south to Chalcis in the north, where it meets the Chalcis–Vathy–Chalcis National Road.

=== Exit list ===
Regional unit	km	mi	Name	Destinations	Notes
Boeotia	0.00	0.00	Chalcis	A1 / E75 – Athens	Entry from and exit to Athens only
Boeotia	0.84	0.52	Schimatari	Lamia, Schimatari	Northbound entry and southbound exit only
Euboea	6.52	4.05	Vathy	Vathy, Ritsona	
Euboea	8.41	5.23	Nafpigeia	Shipyards	Northbound exit and southbound entry only
Euboea	10.52	6.54	—	Vathy (old road)	Southbound exit only
Euboea	10.87	6.75	Chalcis	EO – Chalcis EO – Chalcis (old bridge)	
1.000 mi = 1.609 km; 1.000 km = 0.621 mi: Incomplete access
