= Greek National Road 7 =

Trunk road in Greece

Coordinates: 37.5067°N 22.4983°E

National Road 7
- Εθνική Οδός 7
- Route of the EO7 road, in blue

Route information
- Length: 195.3 km (121.4 mi)
- Existed: 9 July 1963–present

Major junctions
- North end: Corinth
- South end: Kalamata

Location
- Country: Greece
- Regions: Peloponnese
- Primary destinations: Corinth; Nemea station; Argos; Tripoli; Megalopolis; Kalamata

Highway system
- Highways in Greece; Motorways; National roads
← EO6	→ EO8

Greek National Road 7 (Greek: Εθνική Οδός 7), abbreviated as the EO7, is a national road in the Peloponnese region of southern Greece. It connects the cities of Corinth and Kalamata, via Nemea, Argos, Tripoli and Megalopolis. It has been succeeded in importance by the A7 motorway, which also runs from Corinth to Kalamata via Tripoli.

== Route ==
The EO7 is officially defined as a road through the centre of the Peloponnese, running between Corinth to the north and Kalamata to the south, via Nemea, Argos, Tripoli, and Megalopolis. The EO7 runs concurrently with the EO82 between Kalami and Kalamata.

== History ==
Ministerial Decision G25871 of 9 July 1963 created the EO7 from the old EO53, which existed by royal decree from 1955–1963, and also followed the same route as the current EO7. Until 1975, the entirety of the EO7 formed part of the old European route E92.
