= Greek National Road 65 =

Trunk road in Greece

Coordinates: 40.8582°N 22.8953°E

National Road 65
- Εθνική Οδός 65
- Route of the EO65 and Liti–Nea Santa national roads, in blue

Route information
- Length: 122.4 km (76.1 mi)
- Existed: 9 July 1963–present
- History: Extended 1995–1998

Major junctions
- South end: Diavata
- North end: Border with North Macedonia (Doirani); Strymonas bridge

Location
- Country: Greece
- Regions: Central Macedonia
- Primary destinations: Diavata; Kilkis; Drosato; Border with North Macedonia (Doirani) / Rodopoli; Strymonas bridge

Highway system
- Highways in Greece; Motorways; National roads
← EO64	→ EO66

Greek National Road 65 (Greek: Εθνική Οδός 65), abbreviated as the EO65, is a national road in the Central Macedonia region of Greece. The EO65 connects Thessaloniki with Neo Petritsi and the border with North Macedonia near Doirani, via Kilkis: the Doirani end of the EO65 connects with the R1105 road.

== Route ==
The EO65 is officially defined as a national road that branches off the EO2 in Diavata (west of Thessaloniki), and heads north towards Kilkis. From there, the EO65 continues to Drosato, where it splits into two branches: the western branch leads to the border with North Macedonia near Doirani, where it becomes the R1105 road towards Miravci and Nikoliḱ.; the eastern branch runs parallel with the Thessaloniki–Alexandroupolis railway to the bridge over the Strymonas near Neo Petritsi), where it connects with the EO63 and the A25 motorway.

== History ==
Ministerial Decision G25871 of 9 July 1963 created the EO65 from the old EO39, which existed by royal decree from 1955 until 1963, and followed the same route as the current EO65, from Diavata to Kilkis. The northern end of the EO65 was later extended in two phases, from Kilkis to Rodopoli and the border with North Macedonia at Doirani on 15 December 1995, and from Rodopoli to the bridge over the Strymonas near Neo Petritsi in 1998: the extension from Kilkis to the Strymonas bridge took over some of the Kilkis regional unit's provincial roads.

== Liti–Nea Santa National Road ==
The Liti–Nea Santa National Road (Greek: Εθνική Οδός Λήτης - Νέας Σάντας) is an unnumbered branch of the EO65 around the boundary between the Kilkis and Thessaloniki regional units, running from Nea Santa in the north to Liti and the EO12 in the south: the branch is about 14.7 kilometres (9.1 miles) long. The Liti–Nea Santa National Road was created by Ministerial Decision DMEO/e/O/1308 of 15 December 1995, making it part of the secondary national network, and was numbered the EO65β (in Thessaloniki) and EO65γ (in Kilkis) for statistical purposes by the National Statistical Service of Greece (ESYE).
