= Greek National Road 42 =

Highway in northwestern Greece

Coordinates: 38.9215°N 20.9379°E

National Road 42
- Εθνική Οδός 42
- Route of the EO42 and Agios Nikolaos–Actium national roads, in blue
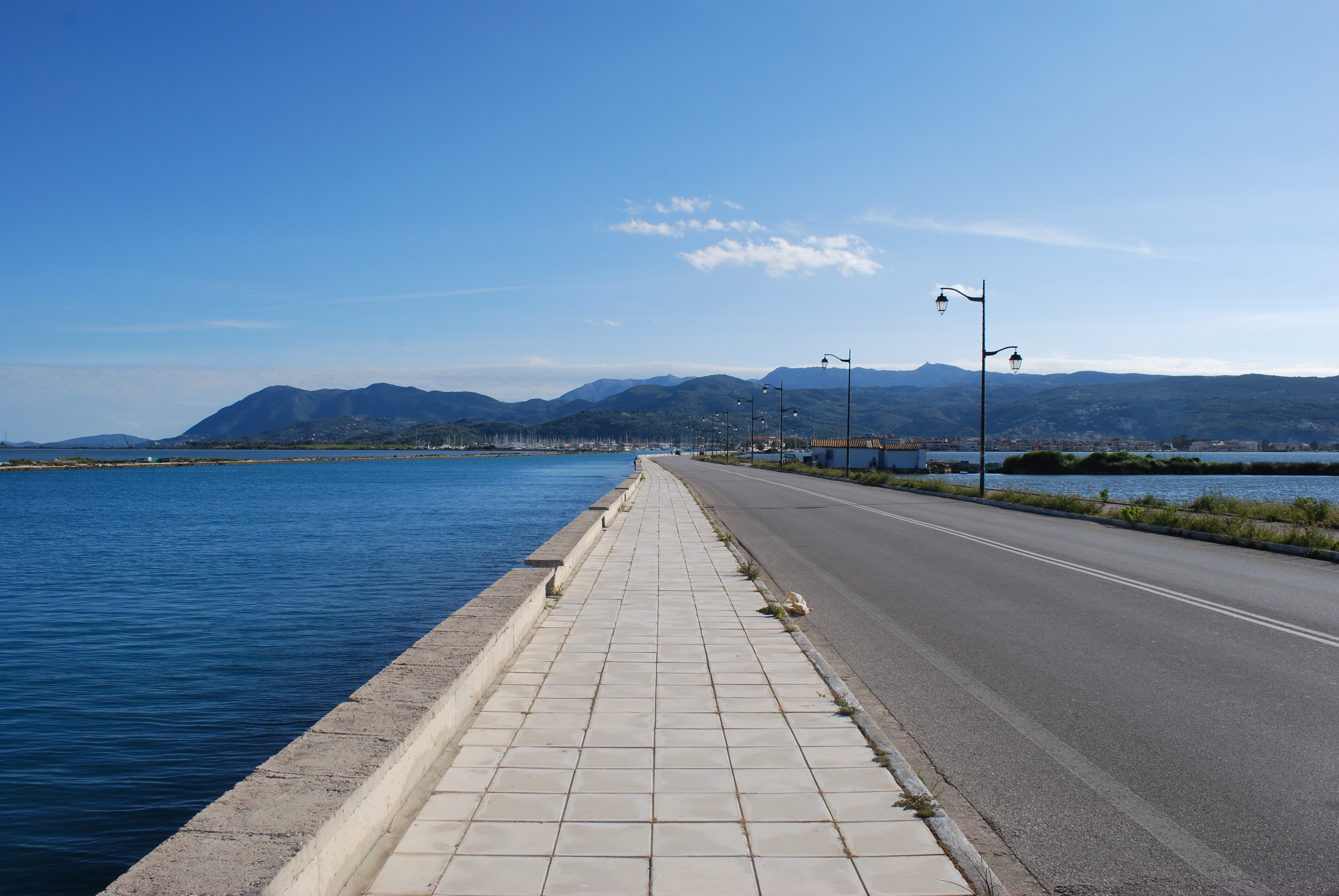
- EO42 at Lefkada

Route information
- Length: 57.5 km (35.7 mi)
- Existed: 9 July 1963–present

Major junctions
- East end: Amfilochia
- West end: Lefkada

Location
- Country: Greece
- Regions: Western Greece; Ionian Islands
- Primary destinations: Amfilochia; Vonitsa; Lefkada

Highway system
- Highways in Greece; Motorways; National roads
← EO40	→ EO44

Greek National Road 42 (Greek: Εθνική Οδός 42), abbreviated as the EO42, is a national road in northwestern Aetolia-Acarnania and in Lefkada, Greece. It links the town of Lefkada with the Greek National Road 5 (Antirrio - Arta - Ioannina) in Amfilochia, passing through the town of Vonitsa.

The eastern part of the EO42, between Amfilochia and Vonitsa, runs along the southern shore of the Ambracian Gulf. The highway contains a bridge over the Vonitsa Lagoon. A drawbridge form the connection of the island of Lefkada to the mainland. The road ends in the town of Lefkada.

== Route ==
The EO42 is officially defined as an east–west road in the Aetolia-Acarnania regional unit and the islands of Lefkada: it branches off the EO5 in Amfilochia, and heads west towards the city of Lefkada, passing through Vonitsa. West of the Castle of Santa Maura, the EO42 crosses a movable pontoon bridge called Santa Maura, which connects Lefkada with the mainland.

In addition to the connection with the EO5 at Amfilochia, The EO42 also connects with the A52 motorway near Vonitsa, and the Agios Nikolaos–Actium National Road near Agios Nikolaos.

== History ==
Ministerial Decision G25871 of 9 July 1963 created the EO42 from most of the old EO19 (between Amfilochia and Lefkada), which existed by royal decree from 1955 until 1963: in December 1995, the Actium branch of the old EO19 became part of the unnumbered Igoumenitsa–Vonitsa National Road.

== Agios Nikolaos–Actium National Road ==
The Agios Nikolaos–Actium National Road (Greek: Εθνική Οδός Αγίου Νικολάου - Ακτίου) is an unnumbered branch of the EO42 in Aktio-Vonitsa, running from Agios Nikolaos in the south to Actium and the A52 in the north. The branch is about 5.62 kilometres (3.49 miles) long, and acted as a shortcut between the EO42 and the Igoumenitsa–Vonitsa National Road, before the latter was shortened by the A52 to Actium in April 2019.

The Agios Nikolaos–Actium National Road was created by Ministerial Decision DMEO/e/O/1308 of 15 December 1995, making it part of the secondary national network, and was numbered the EO42β for statistical purposes by the National Statistical Service of Greece (ESYE) in 1998.
