= Greek National Road 82 =

Trunk road in Greece

National Road 82
- Εθνική Οδός 82
- Route of the EO82 road, in blue

Route information
- Length: 107.3 km (66.7 mi)
- Existed: 9 July 1963–present

Major junctions
- East end: Sparta
- West end: Pylos

Location
- Country: Greece
- Regions: Peloponnese
- Primary destinations: Sparta; Kalamata; Messini; Velika; Chatzis; Pylos

Highway system
- Highways in Greece; Motorways; National roads
| ← EO81 | → EO83 |

Greek National Road 82 (Greek: Εθνική Οδός 82), abbreviated as the EO82, is a national road in the Peloponnese region of Greece. The EO82 runs between Sparta in the east and Pylos in the west, via Kalamata.

== Route ==
The EO82 is officially defined as an east–west road in the Laconia and Messenia regional units: the EO82 runs between Sparta in the east and Pylos in the west, passing through Kalamata, Messini, Velika and Chatzis. Within Kalamata, a small section of the EO82 is part of European routes E55 and E65, sandwiched between Junction 21 of the A7 motorway and the ferry to Kissamos. The EO82 also runs concurrently with the EO7 between Kalamata and Kalami.

Other main road connections with the EO82 include the EO9 at Pylos, and the EO39 and EO84 at Sparta.

== History ==
Ministerial Decision G25871 of 9 July 1963 created the EO82 from all or part of the following short-lived national roads (listed from east to west), which existed by royal decree from 1955 to 1963:

- The old EO61, between Sparta and Kalamata
- The old EO53, between Kalamata and Kalami
- The old EO59, between Kalami and Pylos.
