= Greek National Road 83 =

Trunk road in Greece

National Road 83
- Εθνική Οδός 83
- Route of the EO83 road, in blue

Route information
- Length: 53.0 km (32.9 mi)
- Existed: 9 July 1963–present

Major junctions
- West end: Athens
- East end: Rafina

Location
- Country: Greece
- Regions: Attica
- Primary destinations: Athens; Kifissia; Agios Stefanos (Oeum); Marathon; Rafina

Highway system
- Highways in Greece; Motorways; National roads
← EO82	→ EO84

Greek National Road 83 (Greek: Εθνική Οδός 83), abbreviated as the EO83, is a national road in Attica, Greece. The EO83 is an inverted U-shaped road that runs between Athens and Rafina, via Marathon Dam and Marathon.

== Route ==
The EO83 is officially defined as an inverted U-shaped road in Attica: it branches off the EO54 at Ampelokipoi in Athens, and passes through Kifissia (via Kifisias Avenue), Agios Stefanos (Oeum) and Marathon, before meeting the EO54 at a junction west of Rafina. The section between Marathon and Rafina is on the route of the Athens Classic Marathon, with the remainder of the race route mostly along the EO54.

== History ==
Ministerial Decision G25871 of 9 July 1963 created the EO83 from the old EO8, which existed by royal decree from 1955 until 1963, and followed the same route as the current EO83.

== Proposed public transport links ==
Part of the planned extension of Athens Metro Line 4 from Goudi to Marousi may run under or parallel to the EO83, between the Faros and OTE stations.

== See also ==
- Kifisias Avenue
