= Pallini =

Pallini Παλλήνη
- Municipality
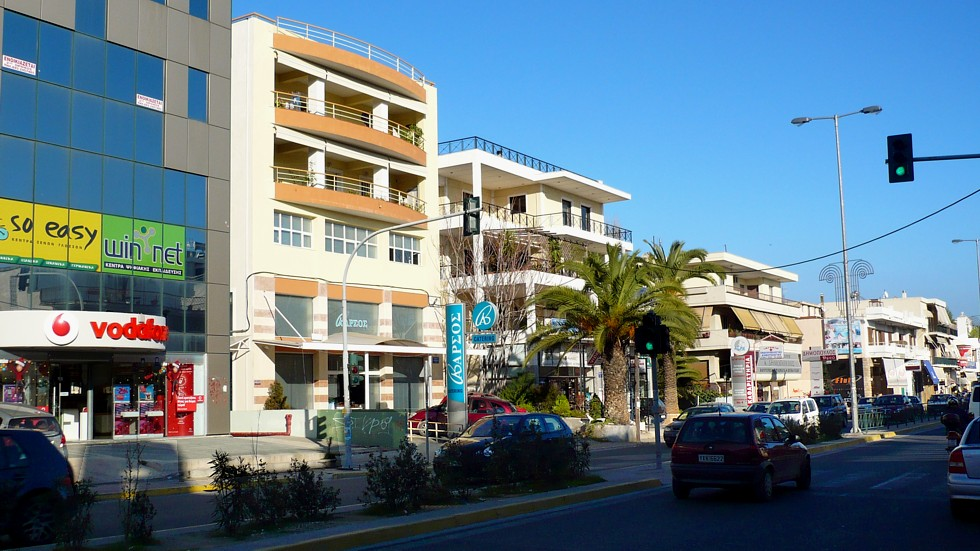
- Pallini city

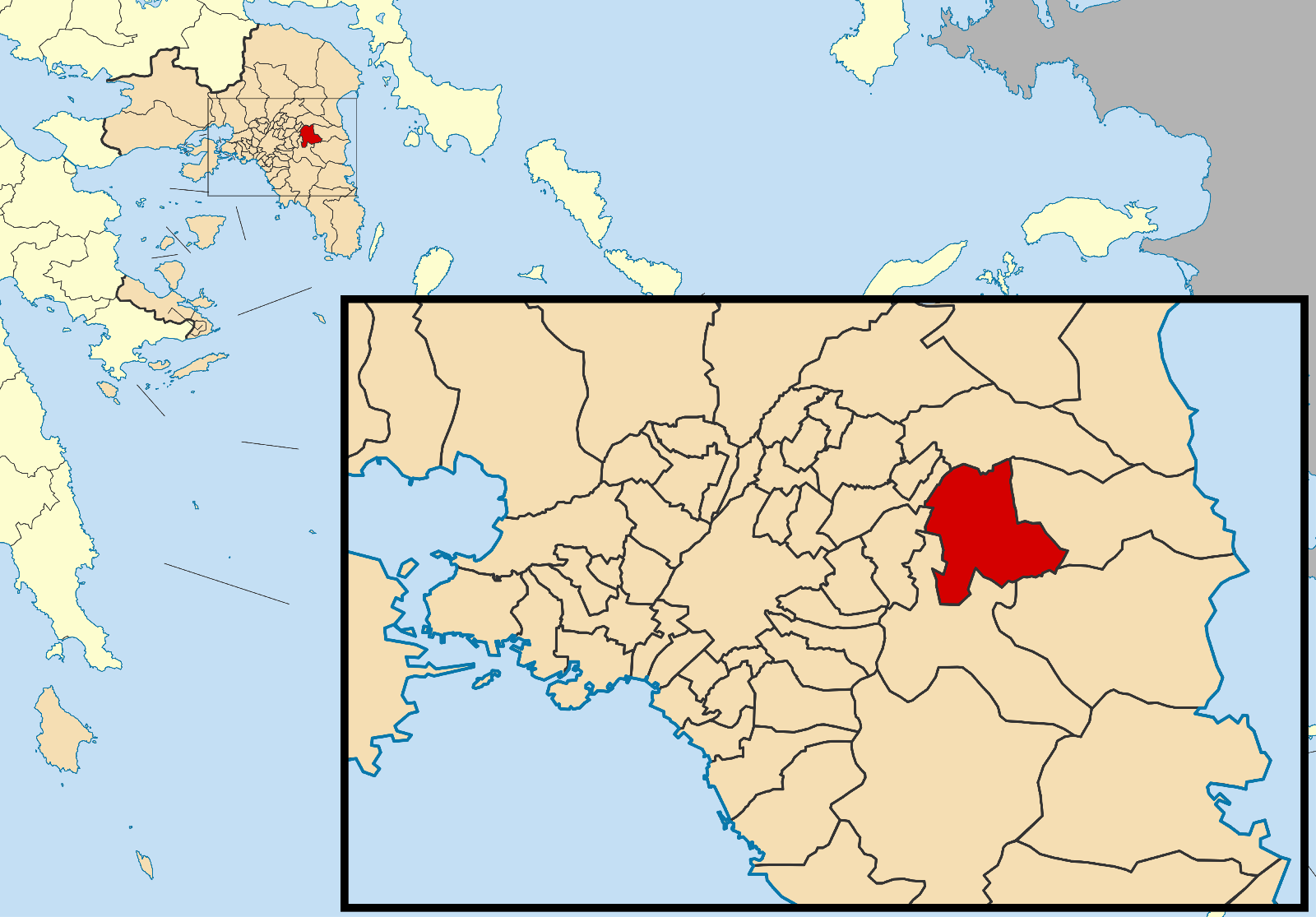

- Location within Greece
- Coordinates: 38°0′N 23°53′E
- Country: Greece
- Administrative region: Attica
- Regional unit: East Attica

Area
  - Municipality: 29.43 km^{2} (11.36 sq mi)
  - Municipal unit: 18.93 km^{2} (7.31 sq mi)
- Elevation: 150 m (490 ft)

Population (2021)
  - Municipality: 59,459
  - Density: 2,020/km^{2} (5,233/sq mi)
  - Municipal unit: 23,445
  - Municipal unit density: 1,239/km^{2} (3,208/sq mi)
- Time zone: UTC+2 (EET)
  - Summer (DST): UTC+3 (EEST)
- Postal code: 153 xx
- Area code: 210
- Website: pallini.gr

Pallini (Greek: Παλλήνη) is a suburban town in the Greater Athens Area and a municipality in East Attica, Greece. The seat of the municipality is the town Gerakas. It is the seat of administration of the East Attica regional unit.

== Geography ==
Pallini is situated in the eastern part of the Athens conurbation, at about 150 m elevation. It lies in a plain between the mountains Penteliko and Hymettus. It is 2 km east of Gerakas and 14 km east of Athens city centre. Its built-up area is continuous with those of the neighbouring suburbs Gerakas and Anthousa. Pallini station, west of the town centre, is served by commuter trains and Athens metro. Greek National Road 54 (Athens - Rafina) passes through Pallini. The municipal unit Pallini includes the subdivision of Leontari.

== Municipality ==
Pallini municipality

The municipality Pallini was formed at the 2011 local government reform by the merger of the following 3 former municipalities, that became municipal units:

- Anthousa
- Gerakas
- Pallini

The municipality has an area of 29.430 km^{2}, the municipal unit 18.932 km^{2}.

== Historical population ==
| Year | Town | Municipal unit | Municipality |
|---|---|---|---|
| 1981 | 5,475 | - | - |
| 1991 | 8,021 | 10,908 | - |
| 2001 | 12,552 | 16,679 | - |
| 2011 | 16,415 | 22,344 | 54,415 |
| 2021 | 17,371 | 23,445 | 59,459 |

== Notable people ==
- Dimitri Nanopoulos (1948-), physicist
- Katerina Stefanidi (1990-), Olympic gold medalist in the women's pole vault

== Gallery ==
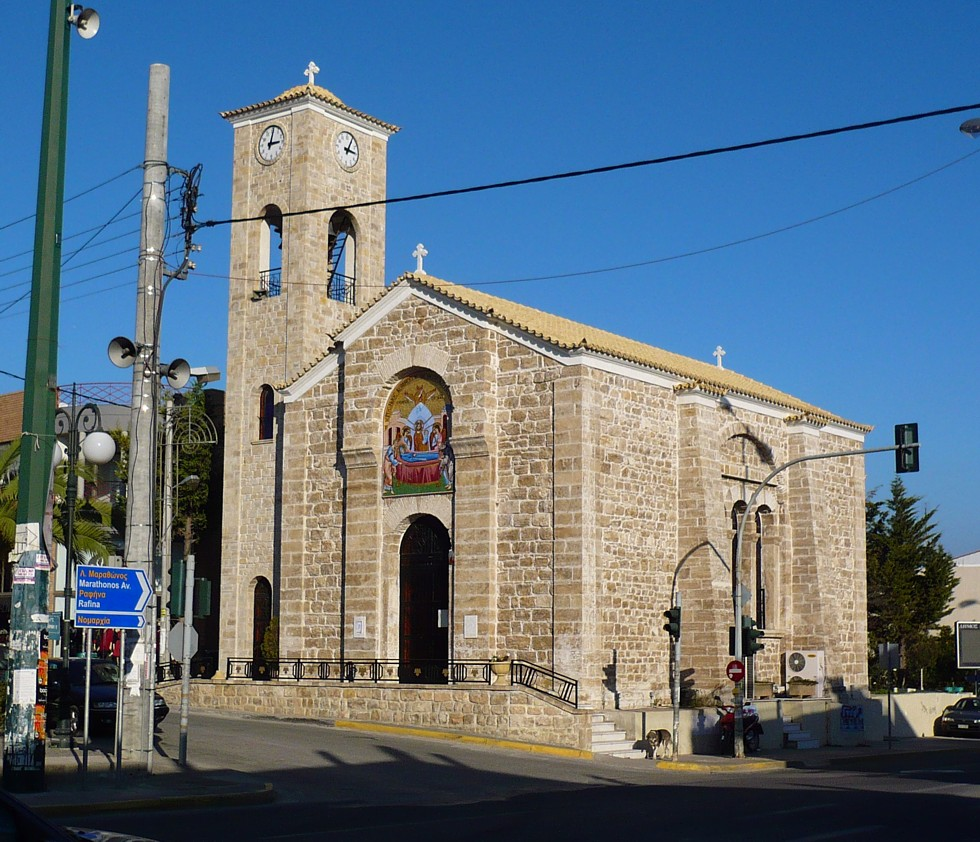
Dormition of Theotokos church

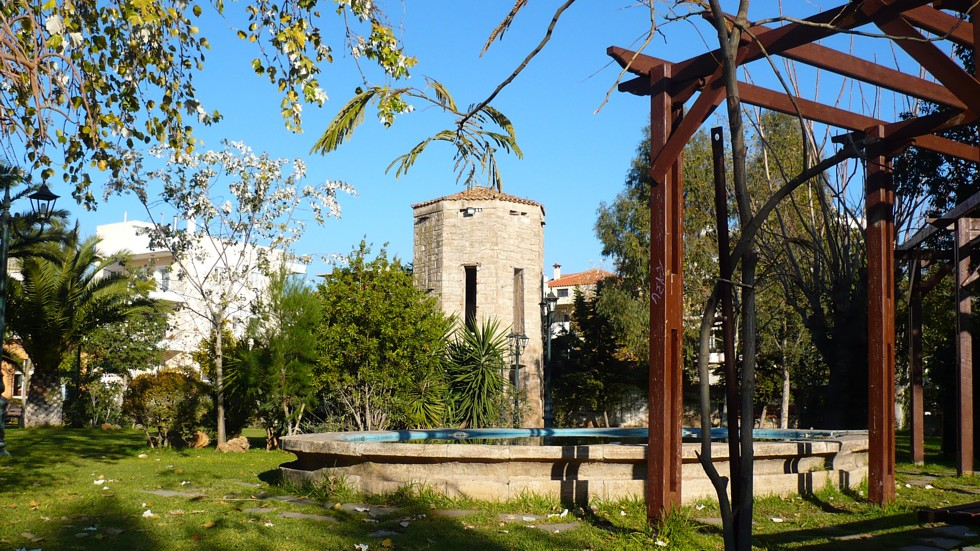
Eleftherias Square

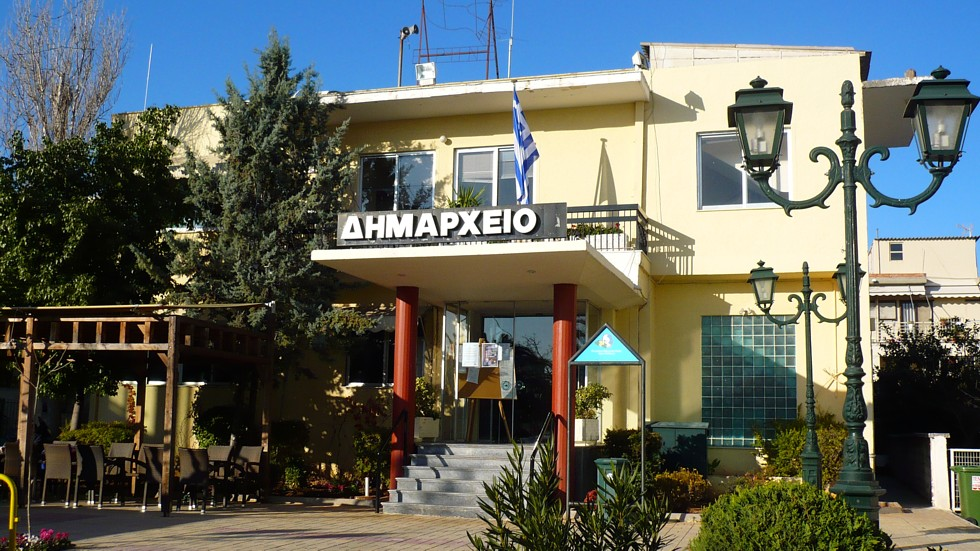
The City Hall

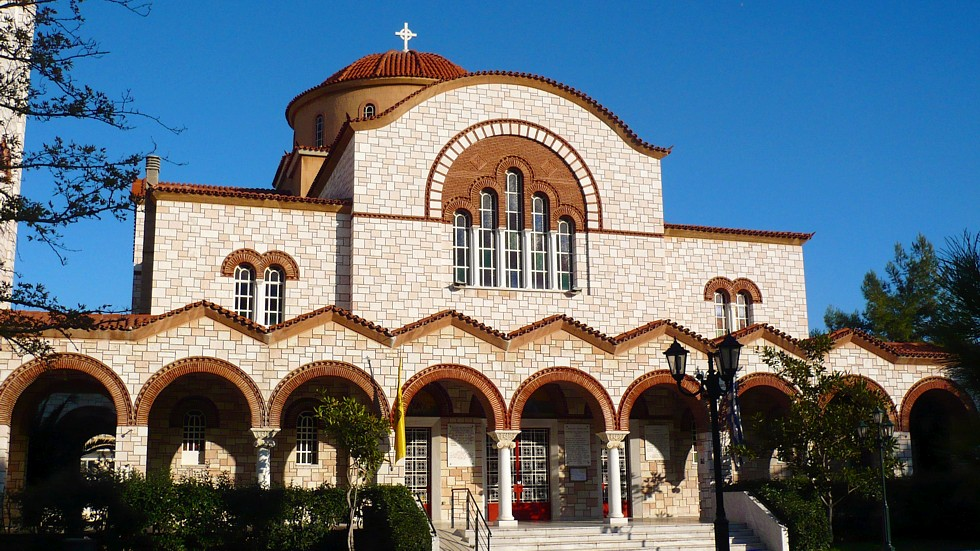
St Tryfonas church

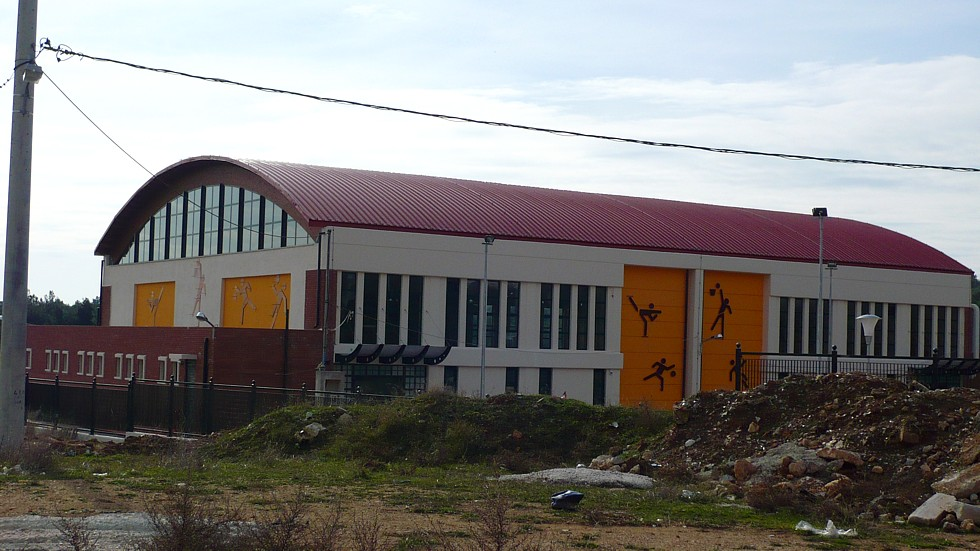
Kantza sports center

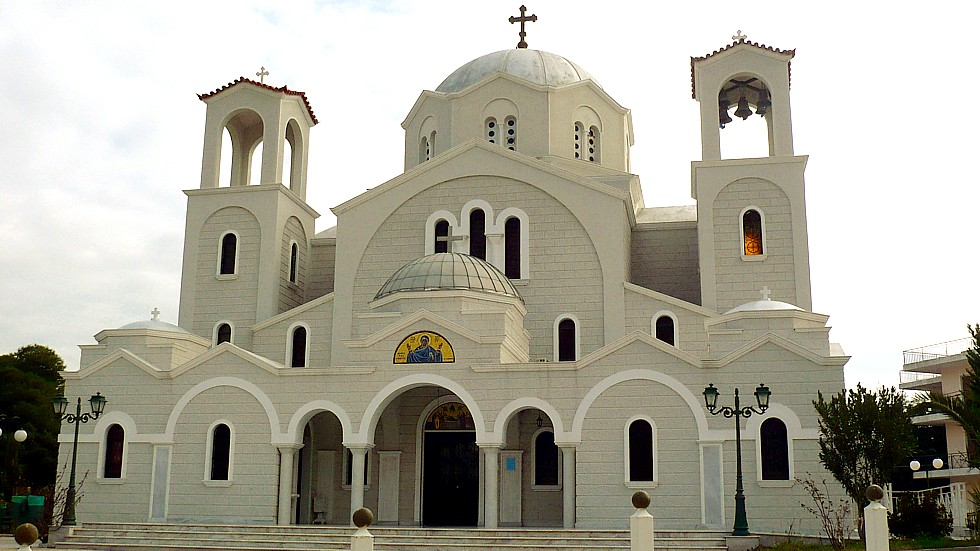
Church in Kantza (Leontari) suburb

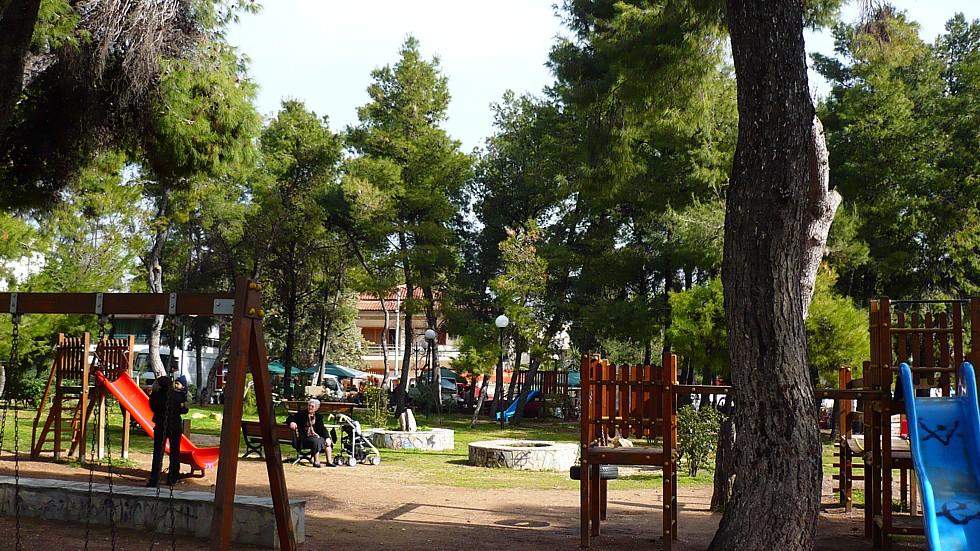
Park

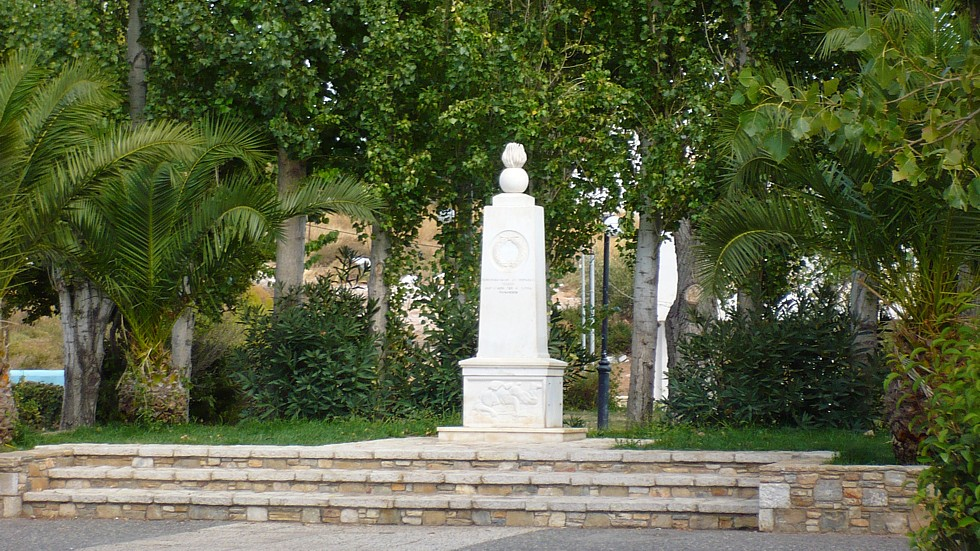
Anthousa Square

== See also ==
- List of municipalities of Attica
