= A90 motorway (Greece) =

Road in Crete, Greece

A90 motorway
- Αυτοκινητόδρομος Α90
- Route of the A90 motorway and expressway, in green

Route information
- Part of E65 (Kissamos–Chania) and E75 (Chania–Sitia)
- Length: 557 km (346 mi)

Major junctions
- West end: Kissamos (Kasteli)
- East end: Sitia

Location
- Country: Greece
- Regions: Crete
- Primary destinations: Kissamos (Kasteli); Chania; Rethymno; Heraklion; Agios Nikolaos; Sitia

Highway system
- Highways in Greece; Motorways; National roads
← A8

The A90 motorway, also known as the Northern Road Axis of Crete (Greek: Βόρειος Οδικός Άξονας Κρήτης, ΒΟΑΚ), is a mixture of motorway and limited-access roads that form the northern backbone of the national highway network in Crete, southern Greece. It is about 310 km, starting in Kissamos and ending in Sitia.

The A90 currently has three sections of motorway, where it bypasses the cities of Chania, Rethymno, and Heraklion. The A90 also forms part of the European E65 road from Kissamos to Chania, and the E75 road for the remainder.

A90 follows the route of the old Highway 90 (except for the Gournes-Hersonissos section in Heraklion, where a viaduct was built in the Aposelemi Gorge, bypassing the former road route). A90 replaced the old Highway from the late 60's.

Construction began in the 1990s, but to date, only sections bypassing the major cities were turned into a four-lane motorway with interchanges, while for the most part, the highway remains a trunk road. Works between Hersonissos and Neapoli began in 2024. The expected completion date of the Heraklion-Chania section of the motorway is 2031, with other sections following later.

== Route ==
Highway 90, once completed, will cross North Crete, starting at Kissamos and ending at Sitia, following exactly the route of National Road 90.

=== Cities ===
Motorway 90 passes near Chania, Rethymno, Heraklion, and Agios Nikolaos.

=== Airports ===
Motorway 90 connects to the following airports: Chania, Heraklion, and Sitia and will also connect to the new Heraklion airport at Kasteli.

=== Marine Ports ===
Motorway 90 connects to marine ports Kavonisi, Kissamos, Chania, Rethymno, Heraklion, Agios Nikolaos, and Sitia

== History ==
In the 1990s, National Road 90, built in the late 1960s, experienced traffic congestion. The road began to be rebuilt into a four-lane highway with a median strip. The first section was 16 kilometers in length.

ΕΥΔΕ BOAK (Ειδική Υπηρεσία Δημοσίων Έργων ΒΟΑΚ - Special State Works Service VOAK), was to manage the design and construction of Greek State Works. Median strips had dramatically reduced accidents. In the section from Linoperama to Giofyros, in 1999-2001, the deaths numbered 23, declining in the 2002-2005 period to 2.

By 2019, only 51 km were upgraded to 4 lane highway with an emergency lane and medial strip, 9 km around Chania, 7 km around Rethymnon, and 35 km in the prefecture of Heraklion, from Linoperamata to Hersonissos.

In the widened sections around the cities of Chania, Rethymnon, and Heraklion, the upgrading/widening of the road was aimed at addressing traffic loads and was based on the road plan of 1968. Speed limits do not exceed 90 km/h, with the exception of the Gournes-Hersonissos section, the only section of the road that meets modern standards.

The Greek Ministry of Infrastructure plans the complete upgrade of the road to a four-lane highway. The project has to be done in two phases: Chania-Agios Nikolaos and Kissamos-Chania and Agios Nikolaos-Sitia.

At the beginning of 2020, two possible scenarios were announced for the financing of the road. The first scenario concerns the government receiving revenue from another concession. The problem is that creditors need approval because part of that money goes to public debt service. In the second scenario, central bank refunds can be used to finance the project, which is being considered at the highest government level.

Reconstruction of part the road began in 2024. The Heraklion - Chania sector was contracted as a 35-year concession in 2025.

== Safety ==
Traffic accidents often occur on the road. Although it is partly due to the human factor, the road has

1. High traffic load
2. is constructed to obsolete specifications
3. inadequate maintenance.

== Images ==
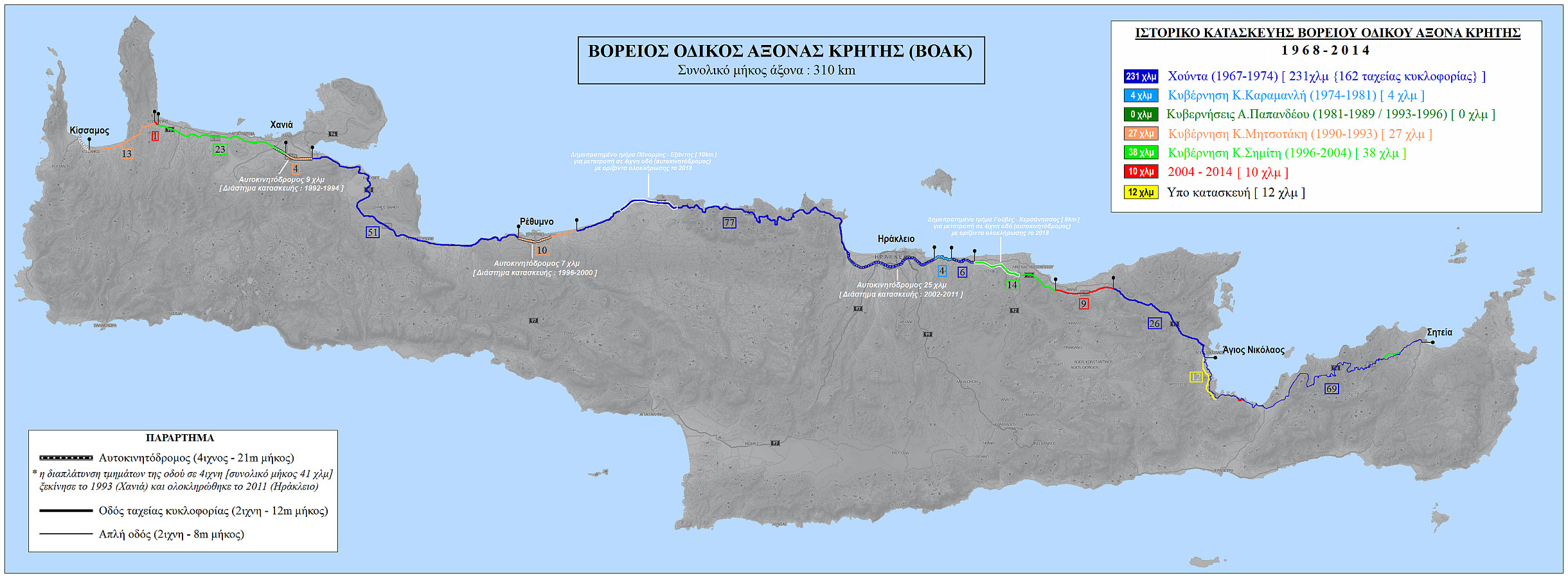
Construction history

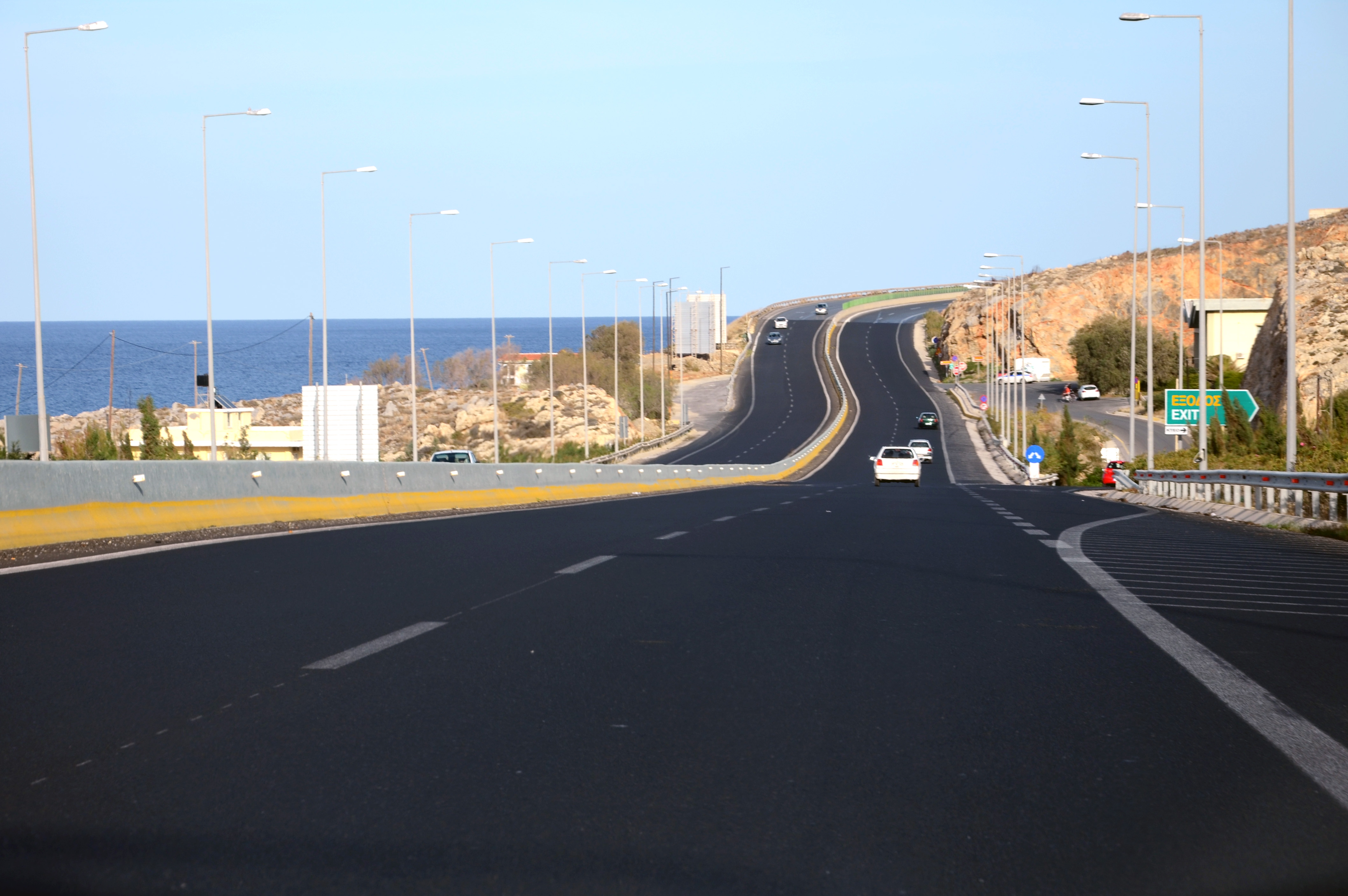
Amnissos

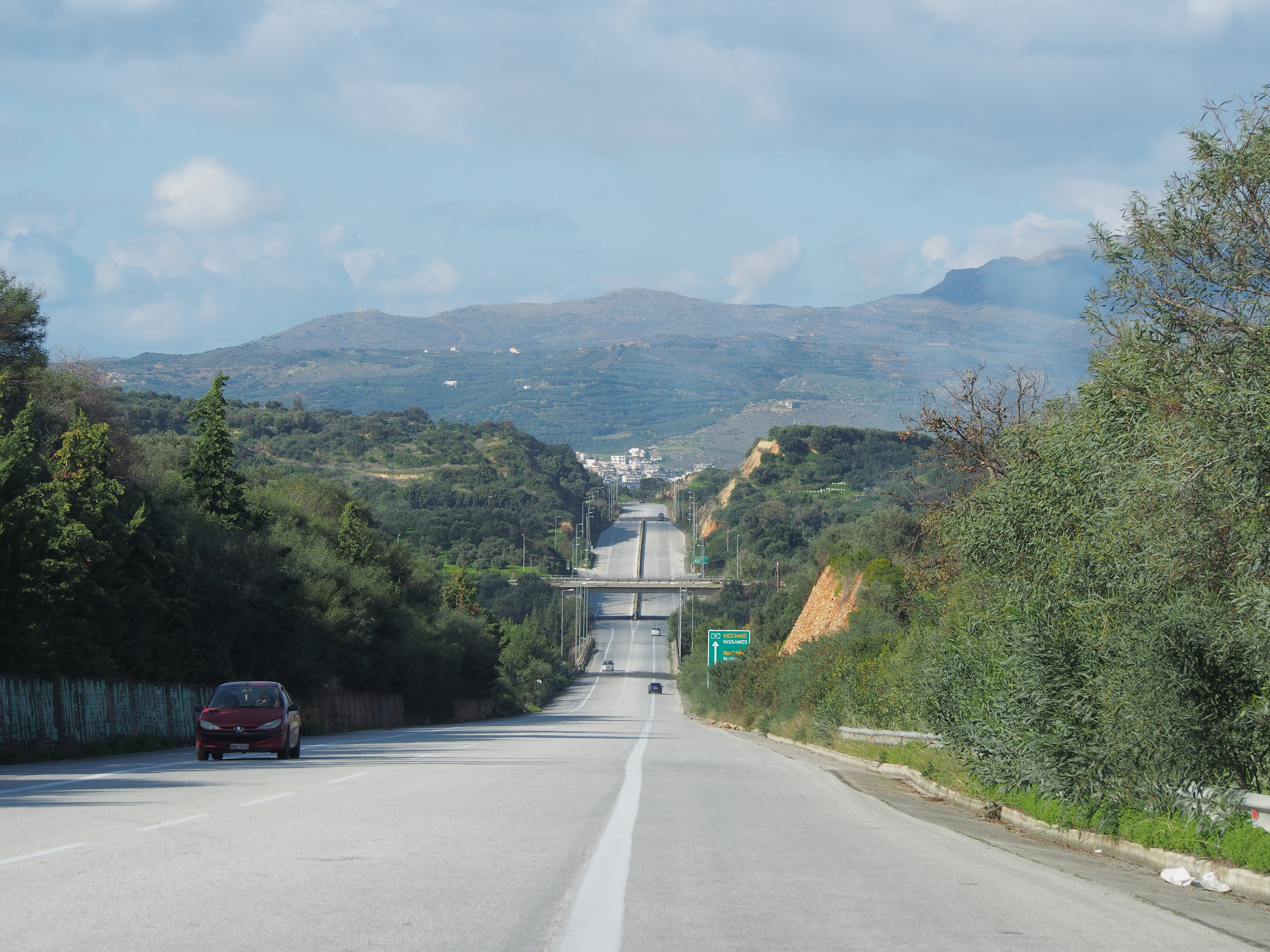
Tavronitis

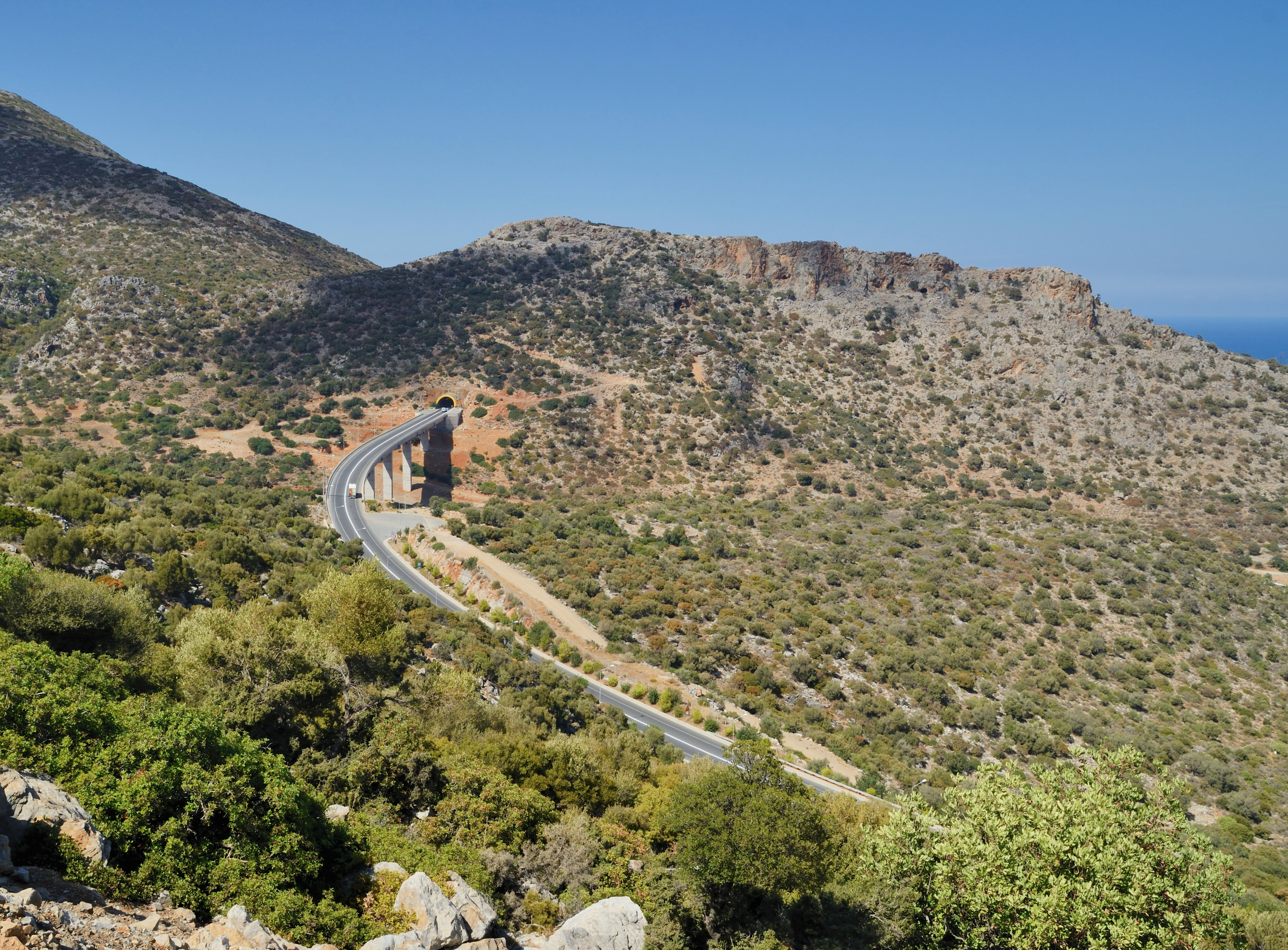
Viaduct and tunnel in Stalida

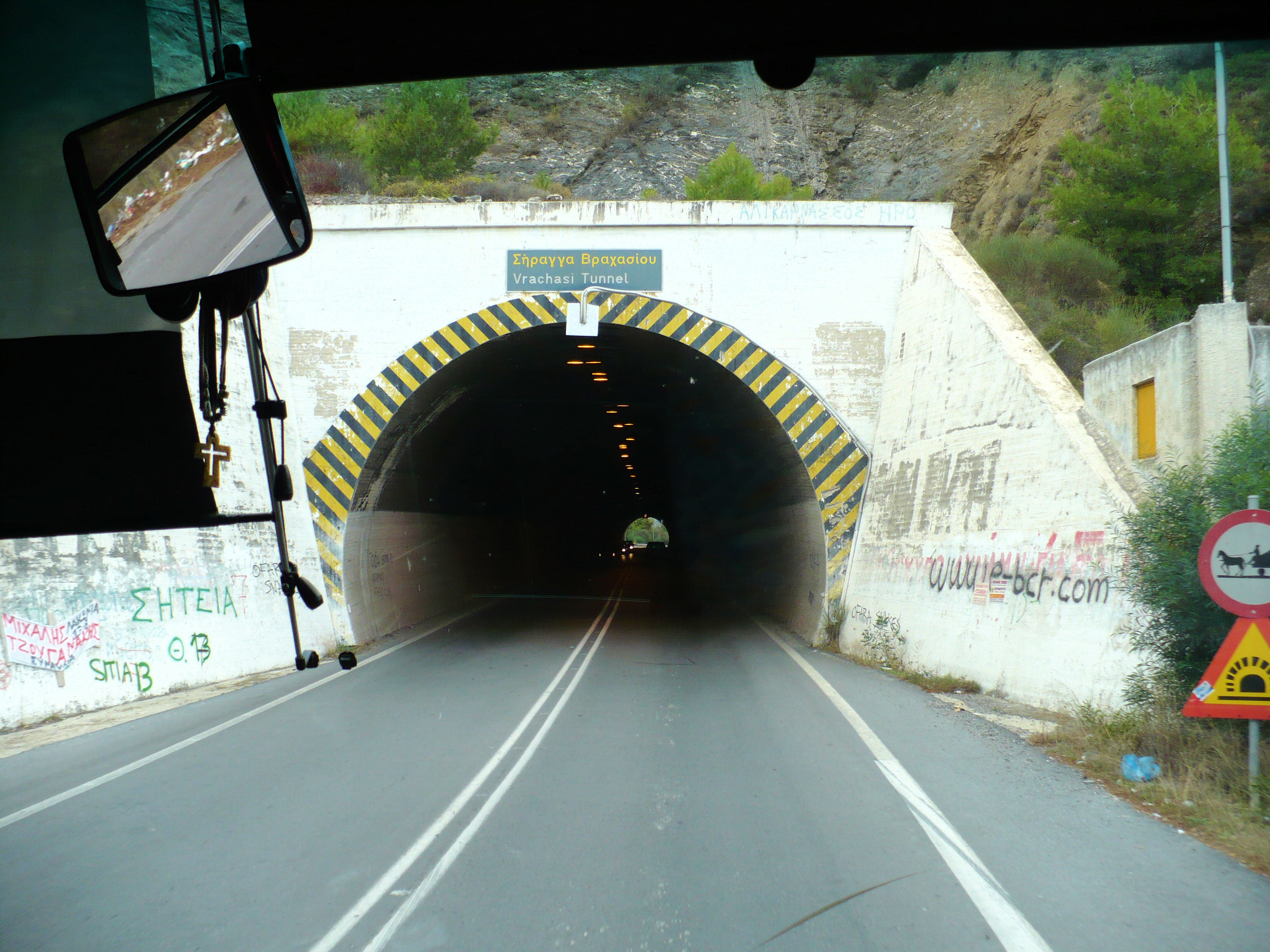
Vrahasi tunnel
