= Krokees =

Krokees Κροκεές
- Municipal unit
- Location within the regional unit

- Location within Greece
- Coordinates: 36°53′N 22°33′E
- Country: Greece
- Administrative region: Peloponnese
- Regional unit: Laconia
- Municipality: Evrotas

Area
  - Municipal unit: 106.93 km^{2} (41.29 sq mi)

Population (2021)
  - Municipal unit: 2,138
  - Municipal unit density: 19.99/km^{2} (51.79/sq mi)
  - Community: 1,029
- Time zone: UTC+2 (EET)
  - Summer (DST): UTC+3 (EEST)
- Vehicle registration: AK

Krokees (Greek: Κροκεές, before 1927: Λεβέτσοβα - Levetsova) is a village and a former municipality in Laconia, Peloponnese, Greece. Since the 2011 local government reform it is part of the municipality Evrotas, of which it is a municipal unit. The municipal unit has an area of 106.930 km^{2}. The population of the community Krokees was 1,029 in 2021. The municipal unit Krokees (pop. 2,138) consists of the communities Krokees, Dafni, Vasilaki and Lagi.

== History ==
Krokees is a small town south of Sparta between the mountains of Taygetos and Parnon of Laconia, the most southern regional unit of the Peloponnese and mainland Greece. In the Bronze Age, Krokees was inhabited by the Achaean and Pelasgian tribes. Later, around 1100 BC, with the rest of Laconia, the town was taken over by the Dorians.

In antiquity, Krokees was famous for its beautiful forest green volcanic stone with green and golden spots (Porphyry) known as "Krokeatis lithos" (Krokean stone). This stone is unique to the area of "Psiphi" of Krokees. Although this stone is very difficult to work with and shape, it was widely used for decorating wealthy homes and for creating beautiful pots and vases. It was used to decorate public bathhouses such as the ones in Corinth, the Church of St. Sophia in Constantinople and the Church of St. Paul in the Vatican. The simple tomb of the 300 Spartans in Thermopylae is made with Krokean stone. Dioskouri (the sons of Dias or Zeus) were the gods/protectors of the ancient town of Krokeai. A marble plaque of Dioskouri, which was excavated in recent times, adorns the fountain in the central square of the town.

Following the Orlov events, in 1777, many inhabitants of Krokees bearing the name "Theoharakos" (Greek: Θεοχαράκος) migrated to Koldere, near Magnesia (ad Sipylum).

The modern town of Krokees has approximately 1,000 inhabitants. In the early 1950s its population was over 3000. Its people are distinguished by their progressive lifestyles and cultural activities. The town has elementary, middle and high schools, a philharmonic (marching band), its own newspaper, The Krokees, and the periodical Deikilon, a magazine on the arts and theater of Laconia.

The town has many cultural organizations and the soccer team "Krokeatikos" which is one of the oldest in Laconia. Krokees is famous for its extra virgin olive oil produced by its agricultural cooperative. The "Krokees Lakonias" low acidity and of exceptional taste olive oil is a protected European Union brand and is recognized as one of the best quality olive oils in the world. The annual Karnavali (Mardi-gras), which started in 1962, is well known to all of Greece. Many professionals, scientists and artists have sprung out of this little town, among them the famous Greek poet Nikiforos Vrettakos. During the 20th century, many Krokeates (Krokeans, Levetsovites) moved to Athens; many more, like so many other Greeks, immigrated mainly to the United States, Canada and Australia.
