= Dafni, Laconia =

Dafni Δαφνί
- Community
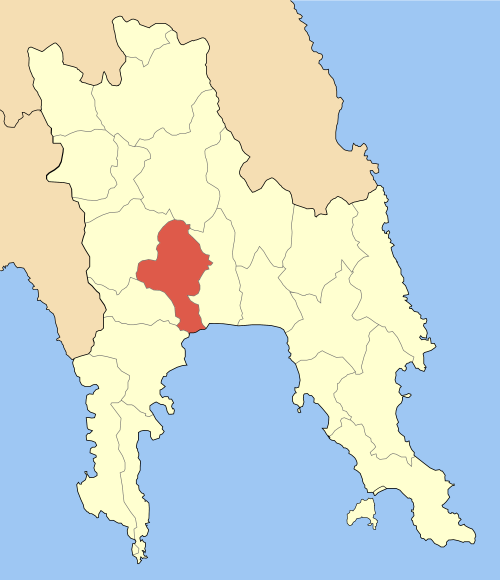
- Location within the regional unit

- Location within Greece
- Coordinates: 36°55′N 22°32′E
- Country: Greece
- Administrative region: Peloponnese
- Regional unit: Laconia
- Municipality: Evrotas

Population (2021)
  - Municipal unit: 736
- Time zone: UTC+2 (EET)
  - Summer (DST): UTC+3 (EEST)
- Postal code: 23057
- Vehicle registration: AK

Dafni (Greek: Δαφνί, also Δάφνιο - Dafnio) is a small town of Laconia in the municipality of Evrotas, and to the Krokees municipality before the 2011 Kallikratis reform. In the 2021 census its population was registered as 736.

== History ==
The current residents of the village originate from the nearby village of Lykovouno, a medieval settlement. The name Dafni may originate in turn from the ancient settlement of Aphidnae, or otherwise simply from the prevalence of laurels in the area (δάφνη is the Greek word for laurel). The village is notable for its agricultural produce, as well as the annual "Vlach Wedding" (Βλάχικος Γάμος) and wine festival.

== Associations in Dafni ==
- Cultural Association of Dafni (Πολιτιστικός Σύλλογος Δαφνίου), established in 1929 and has:

- Chess Group

- Music Group

- Dance Group

- Youth Group

- Athletic Association of Dafni ( Αθλητικός Όμιλος Δαφνίου) established in 1959 and has:

- Football Team of men

- Youth Football Team

- Athletic Association "Olympiada Dafniou" ( Αθλητικός Σύλλογος "Ολυμπιάδα Δαφνίου") has:

- Men Basketball Team

== Notable people ==
- Ilias Anastasakos, Greek football player
- Angelo Tsarouchas, Greek-Canadian actor
