= Greek National Road 90 =

Trunk road in Greece

Coordinates: 35.4091°N 24.7453°E

National Road 90
- Εθνική Οδός 90
- Route of the EO90 road, in blue

Route information
- Length: 327.3 km (203.4 mi)
- Existed: 9 July 1963–present

Major junctions
- West end: Kissamos (Kasteli)
- East end: Sitia

Location
- Country: Greece
- Regions: Crete
- Primary destinations: Kissamos (Kasteli); Chania; Rethymno; Heraklion; Agios Nikolaos; Sitia

Highway system
- Highways in Greece; Motorways; National roads
← EO89	→ EO91

Greek National Road 90, also known as VOAK (Northern Crete Highway: Greek: Βόρειος Οδικός Άξονας Κρήτης, VΟΑΚ) is a national road that runs along the northern coast of the island of Crete, Greece. It connects Kissamos in the west with Siteia in the east, via Chania, Rethymno, Heraklion and Agios Nikolaos.

The road consists of two traffic lanes (one in each direction) without a central reservation. Although it passes through both rugged mountainous and lowland terrain, it has no tunnels or valley bridges (except for some on the new National Road). The Vrachasi tunnel was the first tunnel built on the National Road in Greece in 1971 on the new road but there is also a 200 m. long tunnel in national road 5 near Kleisoura that may is even older. The road is part of the European route E75.

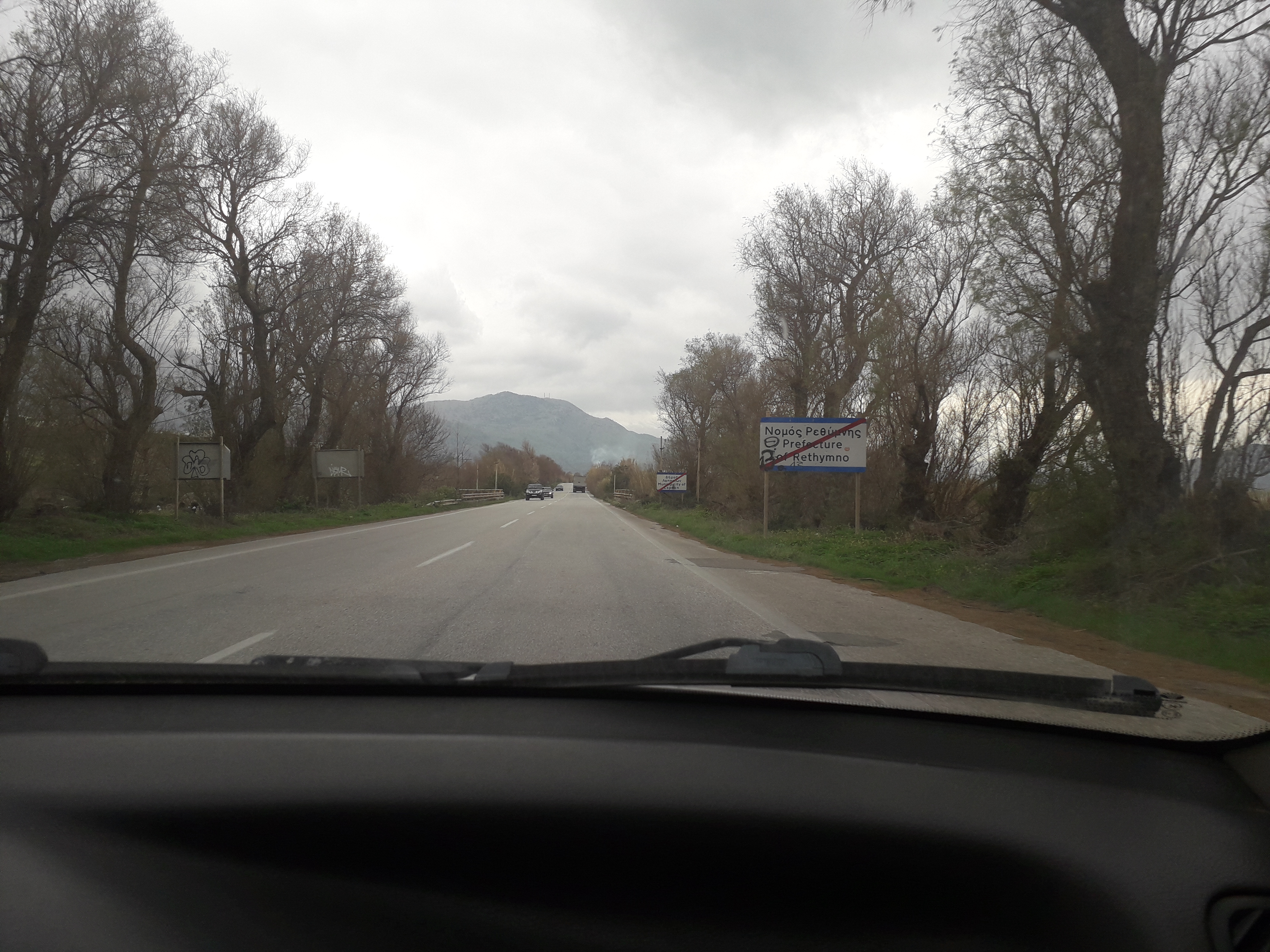
The Chania-Rethymno border

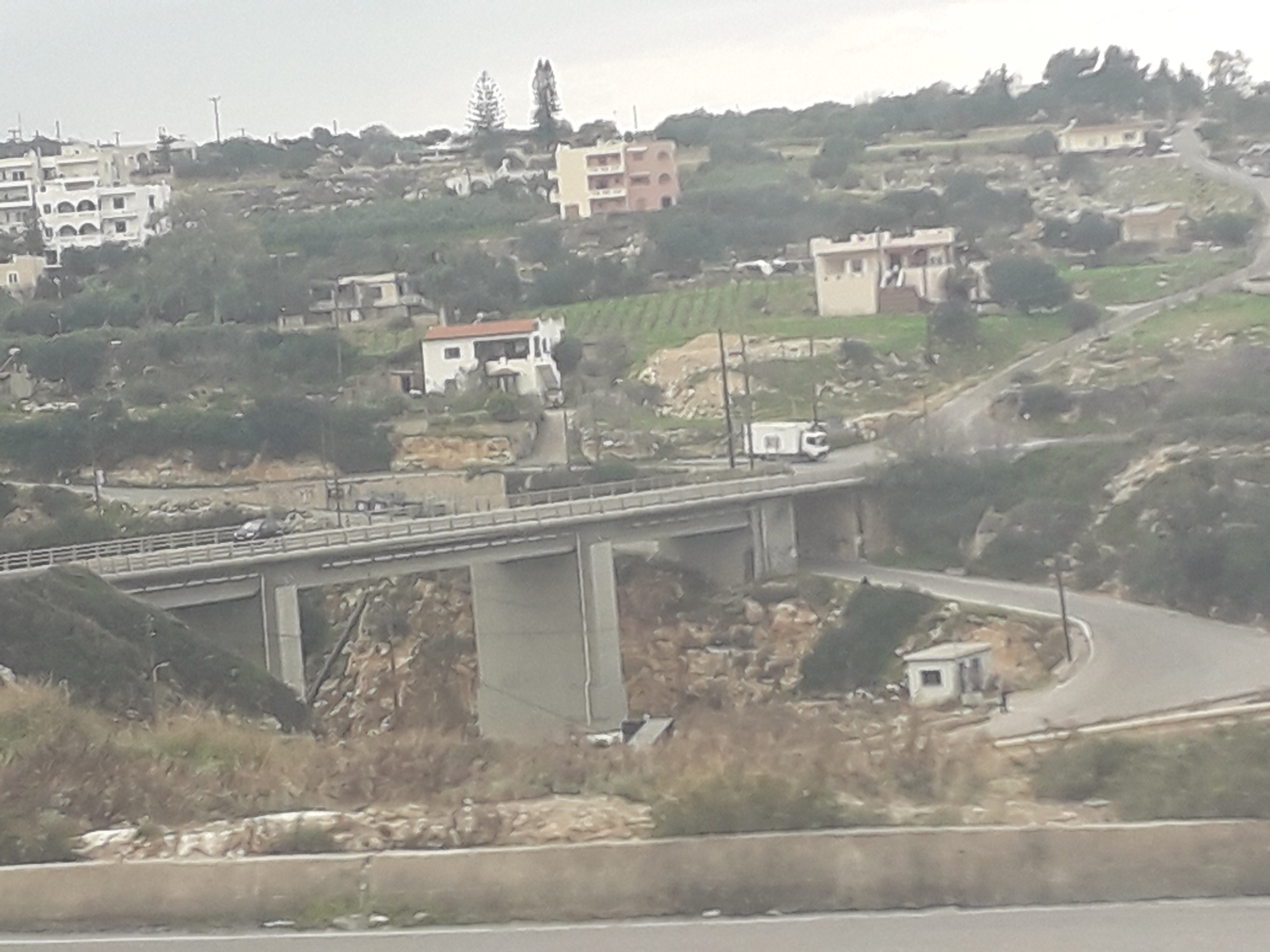
The Gerani Bridge in Rethymno

The planned A90 motorway is essentially the upgrade of this highway which it will replace after its completion.

== Route description ==
The National Road 90 is a large expressway on the West-East axis in Crete that connects the westernmost city and port, Kissamos with the easternmost, Sitia. It is also part of two major European routes: E65 (Kissamos-Chania) and E75 (Chania-Rethymno-Heraklion-Agios Nikolaos-Sitia).

Throughout its length, it has a width of about 12 metres (39 ft) Some other sections are 8 metres (26 ft) wide.

The total length of the Old National Road is about 320 kilometres (200 mi), while the new is 240 kilometres (150 mi).

== Notable structures ==
Remarkable valley bridges are the bridges of Palaiokastro and Pantanassa near Heraklion, which were built to avoid landfilling of the respective valleys, as proposed in the original study. The tunnel in Vrachasi, Lassithi was built instead of a cutting through the mountain range of Anavlychos, because its unstable morphology would lead to landslides. These large and relatively innovative works were built in 1971-1973.

== History ==
=== The "Royal Road" ===
The first national road in Crete was the "royal road" (Greek: Βασιλικός δρόμος), a dirt road that was built about a thousand years ago, on which pedestrians and riders came and went from Sitia to Kissamos. The goods were loaded on donkeys, mules and horses and transported from one place to another. Although in recent centuries there were carriages and carts, there were no long-distance transport with them, due to lack of adequate road network in the rugged mountains of the island. During the Cretan Revolution, the Cretan revolutionaries came and went from this road to confront the robbers. Before the entrances of the cities, but also inside the cities, there were inns equipped with beds for sleep as well as with water, wine, raki, rusk, olives, cheese, cooked food, boiled meats, kapriko, snails, honey, sausages, and other foods for their feeding. In Gouves, this street is today known as "Nikos Kazantzakis Street", and was named in honor of the homonymous thinker.

The "National Road of Crete" began construction in 1911, during the years of the Cretan State and was completed in 1925, initially as a dirt road and later with gravel. In 1955, the National Road was numbered the EO65, and then in 1963 the EO90.

The new National Road 90 was designed in the early 1960s and began construction in 1968, with the aim of connecting major urban centers, ports and airports and residential and tourist development, as well as replacing the old national road. Prior to its construction, other ideas had been proposed, including the upgrading of the old National Road. Contrary to what is believed by the locals, it was not invented during the years of the military junta, but during the government of the Center Union and specifically the idea belongs to Andreas Papandreou and Konstantinos Mitsotakis. In fact, the idea at the time was to extend from Platanos, Chania, to Sitia. Eventually, however, the construction started from Chania, following the initiative of Mitsotakis, with the first contracts being assigned to the "Atlas" with Fotis Polatos as site manager in the Chania - Souda section and in the Ionios, TEGK and XEKTE in the Souda - Nio Chorio, Nio Chorio - Georgioupolis and Musela - Rethymnon sections. The Chania-Rethymnon section was the first to be put into traffic. The auction for the construction of the sections Stavromenos - Bali and Bali - Fodele took place on March 21, 1967, with bidders XEKTE and "Skapaneus" respectively. The project survived the coup d'état, and the project was signed on May 20, 1968 (14 months later).

The initial cross section was 11-12.5 meters wide, in the section from Kastelli to Agios Nikolaos and ~ 8 m. in the section from Agios Nikolaos to Sitia, but then a slow lane was added in places with steep slopes. However, the goal of keeping the slopes below 7.5% and the average design speed of 80 kilometres per hour (50 mph) was not possible due to the mountainous terrain, while for reasons of cost reduction, the original design did not include tunnels or valley bridges. The Pantanassa and Paleokastro bridges near Heraklion, 150 metres (490 ft) long each, were built in 1971, instead of landfilling the two respective valleys. The Vrachasi tunnel, 285 metres (935 ft) long, was built in 1971-1973, instead of cutting into loose rocks, with the risk of landslides. The Vrachasi tunnel was the first tunnel in a national highway built in Greece. During its opening, there was a landslide due to loose soil (graphite), but the loose volume was stabilized with cement injections.

The construction of the New National Road helped the economic and tourist development of northern Crete in the 1970s and 1980s. Over time, new sections began to be added, a total of about 47 kilometres (29 mi), and a width of 12.5 metres (41 ft). Other sections that were built later were the bridges between Heraklion and Malia, the bridge in Hamezi and the tunnels between Agios Nikolaos and Kalo Chorio, Lassithi. During the 1990s, due to the increase in traffic load, the construction of the A90 motorway began.
