= Gerakas =

Gerakas Γέρακας
- Municipal unit
- The City of Ancient Gargittos

- Location within the regional unit

- Location within Greece
- Coordinates: 38°2′N 23°51′E
- Country: Greece
- Administrative region: Attica
- Regional unit: East Attica
- Municipality: Pallini

Area
  - Municipal unit: 6.633 km^{2} (2.561 sq mi)
- Elevation: 200 m (660 ft)

Population (2021)
  - Municipal unit: 33,856
  - Municipal unit density: 5,104/km^{2} (13,220/sq mi)
- Time zone: UTC+2 (EET)
  - Summer (DST): UTC+3 (EEST)
- Postal code: 153 44
- Area code: 210
- Vehicle registration: Z
- Website: www.gerakas.gr

Gerakas (Greek: Γέρακας) is a town, a suburb of Athens and a former municipality in East Attica, Greece. Since the 2011 local government reform it is part of the municipality Pallini, of which it is the seat and a municipal unit.

In antiquity, Gerakas constituted the Athenian Mesogeia deme of Gargettus, in the tribe of Aigeis, according to the administrative model of Cleisthenes. Today, it is a rapidly developing city of the northern mesogea and the eastern gate to the Athens basin. It is known as the birthplace of the famous philosopher Epicurus.

The city is set at a significant place at the junction of Ymittos and Penteli foothills. The limits of Gerakas expand from Stavros up to the Koufos and Desi Hills, 12 km northeast of the centre of Athens and just 2 km west of Pallini. The city has a population of 33,856 residents (in 2021), covering a land area of 6.633 km^{2} and having a population density of 5,104 residents per km^{2}. Gerakas can be seen at an elevation of 190 to 374 meters, giving the area both flat and mountainous characteristics.

== Overview ==
The first permanent residents inhabited around the old Athens–Laurium highway that passed through, descending from Northern Greece, mostly Arvanites from Ipiros sent to the Masogean plain at around 1205 a. C. as mercenaries to protect the Duchy of Athens. On the northern part of the city islanders from the Aegean Sea came to work at the world-famous marble workshops of Penteli. Until the late 1970s, most of the land was covered by farmhouses that constitute a Paianian settlement, while in 1980 it was recognized as a new commune of East Attica. The name of the commune arises after an informal referendum among the three settlements of "Gerakas", "Stavros" and "Gargittos". The center of the city is located around the Mekedonias Square, northern of Marathonos Avenue, which is a meeting place for all residents and visitors, a true adornment, whereas St. John is the patron saint of Gerakas. The main shopping district runs along the Marathonos Avenue, where the industrial and business activity is located.

== Etymology ==
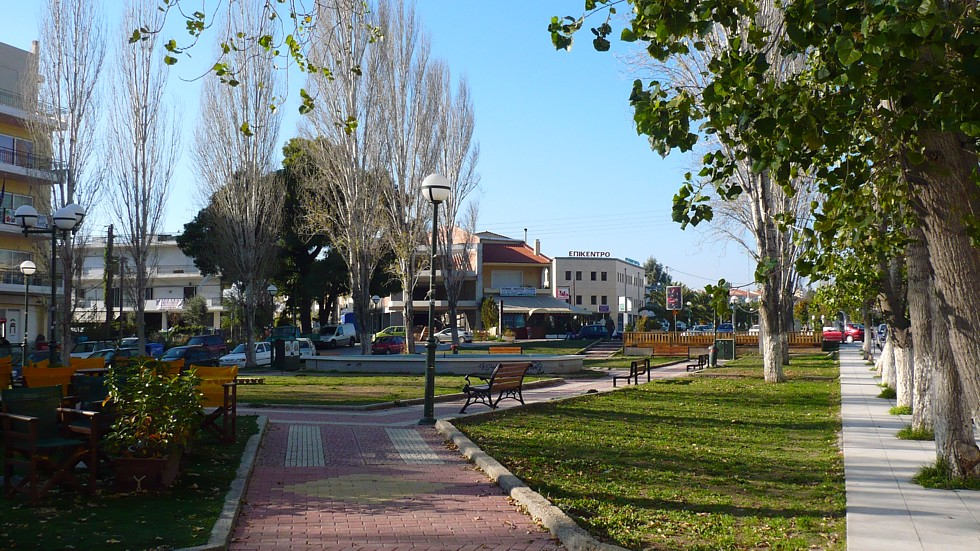
The Central Makedonias Square

The first name that is associated with the region is "Gargitos", a name which one may come across various ancient scripts and indicate the southern foothills of Penteli. According to Greek historians, Gargitos was a local hero of the region who inhabited Attica after moving from Peloponesse during the Peloponnesian Wars, descending from Asia along with the Lydian Pelops. According to the hιstorian Paysanias, Gargittos was the son of Ion.

During the Middle Ages, the region is called "Karyttos", as viewed by the foreign cartographers' work. It is a region of great religious activity, where the Saint Nikolaos Church is preserved at Patima, which Saint Timotheos used as a place for asceticism until the Penteli Monastery was finished.

The modern name of "Gerakas" comes from the name of the grand logothete Ierakas, a church official who owned large pieces of land during the 16th century, some of which were under proprietary claims between Saint Timotheos and Saint Philothei. He decided to give his titles and resolve the dispute, therefore they named the region after him. The name Ierakas comes from Ierax (Iέραξ) which means hawk (in modern Greek geraki). The name inflects as ο Ieraks (ο Ιέραξ), tou Ierakos (του Ιέρακος), ton Ieraka (τον Ιέρακα), and in modern Greek Geraka. In the nominative form it is today used as Gerakas (ο Γέρακας) and it is a singular masculine noun.

== Geography ==
=== Topography ===
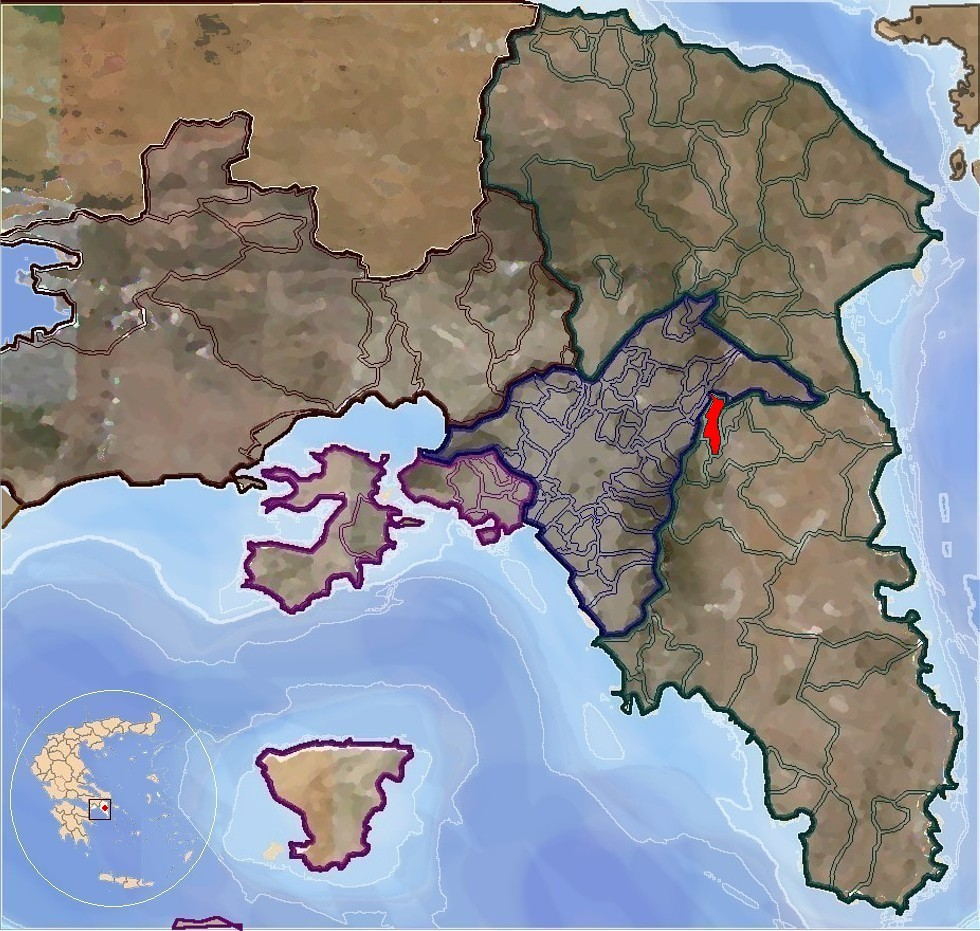
Gerakas within Attica region

Gerakas is located at the heart of the Αttica land at a plain of 195 metres elevation. It is surrounded by the mountainous endings of the Penteliko at north and Ymittos at the south. From the west, the region neighbours with the Athens basin and to the east the mesogea plain lies. Gerakas expands vertically between the mountain junction, covering an area of 6.6 km^{2}, reaching an elevation of 374 metres up to the land of Penteli. The city is located 12 kilometers northeast of center of Athens and 2 km west of Pallini. It is surrounded by the Municipalities of Agia Paraskevi, Halandri, Vrilissia, Penteli, the Commune of Anthoussa, as well as the Municipalities of Pallini and Glika Nera. At first, it was enclosed geographically within the Athens basin, but due to borders allocation it was partially removed towards the mesogean plain, losing pieces of Patima, Pefka and Stavros from Chalandri and Agia Paraskevi and gaining parts of Balana from Pallini. Substantially, Gerakas is a part of the northeastern part of Athens, as it receives large amounts of athenian population during the recent years.

Gerakas, Stavros, Gargittos, Patima, Balana and the mountainous settlement of Desi are some of the most known modern neighbourhoods of the city. Gerakas is surrounded by Vrilissia, Halandri and Agia Paraskevi to the west, Glyka Nera to the south, Pallini and Anthousa to the east and Penteli to the north.

== History ==
=== Antiquity ===
In Ancient Greece, during the 6th century BC, throughout the shine of the Athenian State, a great union is established by the residents of Aharnes, Gargittos, Pallini and Paiania, at the heart of the land of Attica (Athenian countryside). These residents are called at that time Athenian citizens, descendants of the Ionian tribe. The union takes place at a significant position, as a passage from the great city to the plain delimited by the Attica mountains, reaching the east coast. The religious and political alliance is centered around the famous Pallinida Athena sanctuary, a glorious temple where the goddess Athena was worshiped, attracting the respect, as well as the religious and trading interest of the citizens of Athens city-state. This was a temple of similar beauty and architecture of those of Poseidon at Sounion, Nemesis at Ramnous and Hephaestus at the ancient Agora of Athens. The temple was accessible through stone paths connecting it with the great city of Athens and other great settlement in Attica (Athens city-state).

In 546 BC, the temple is meant to be marked by historical events, as Peisistratos and his followers strike against those opposed to the tyranny in Athens. According to the great historian Herodotus, for the third time the scheming tyrant tries to take over the governance that his opponents had taken away from him, the Alcmaeonidae. And, while the armies were encamped at the junction of Vrilittos and Hymettus mountains, Amphilitus, augur of the temple shows up in front of Peisistratos and gives him an oracle, assuring him that he has gained the favor of the goddess Athena. Peisistratos, confident on his victory decides to spring on his opponents, attacking at the right time, putting them to fight. After his dominance, he honors his dead soldiers by setting up monuments at the place of the battle. At the environs of Gargittos and Pallini where the battle took place, tombs with monuments are set at each grave of the soldiers, who are buried along with their favourite heirlooms, such as vessels, jewelry and coins. Afterwards, Peisistratos moves on to Athens where he establishes tyranny.

When Peisistratos dies, in 527 BC, Cleisthenes, a prominent political figure of this era, tries to give an end to tyranny, while conflicts between Athenians and Spartans, Chalkidans and Thebans take place. In his effort to set equality and isonomy to the Athenian state, Cleisthenes abolishes the institutions of the genus and the tribes, while he sets up a new state structure based on the topographic orientation.

The four old Ionian tribes are negated and replaced by ten artificial which are named after their local heroes. The Attica dominion is distinguished to three zones, each of which encloses ten trittyes. Ten trittyes are created from the main city of Athens (asty), ten from the coast (paralia) and ten from the interior of Attica (mesogeia). The region of Gargittos is located at the heart of the mesogeia, which is demarcated by Flya, Dekeleia, Aphidnes and Agnous. This area is named Mesogea because, according to the ancient borders of Attica, it is the most landlocked part, at the center of the land.

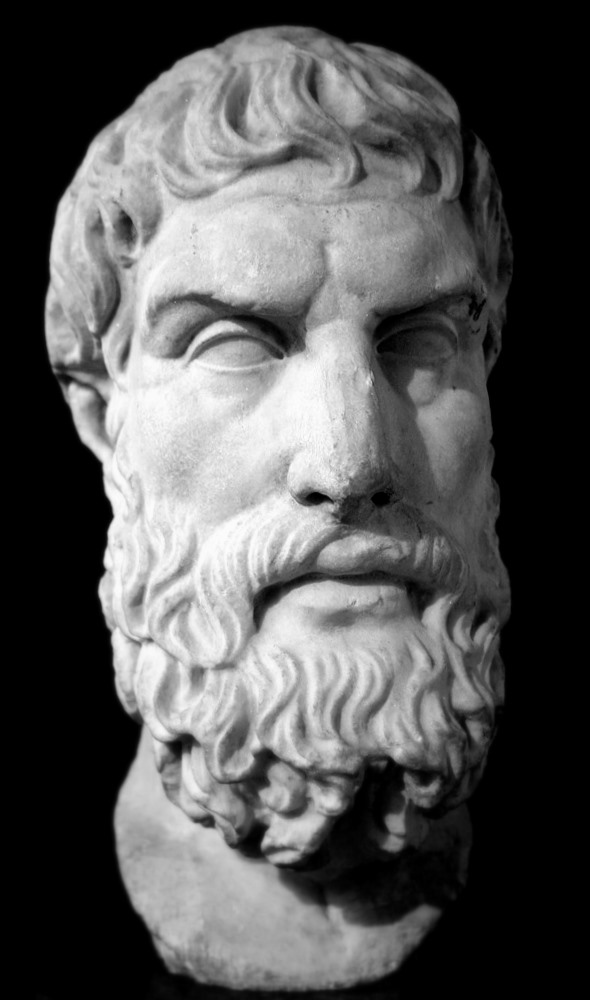
Epicurus from Gargittos

According to the Gargittius historian Epicurus, at this region the dead body of Eurystheus was buried, an opponent of Hercules who gained the kingship at Mycenae after a battle at Marathon, where he buried his opponent's head.

Meanwhile, the Pallantides, the 50 sons of Pallas, leader of Pallini and brother of Aegeus, claimed the throne from Aegeus' son, Theseus, whom they never recognized as a legal successor of the Athenian kingdom. Theseus moved for a while to Crete and the Pallantides assumed he would not return. When Theseus came back to Attica from his journey to Hades, he was informed at Gargittos of the rule of the Pallantides and the establishment of the throne at Pallini. Cursing the Athenians, he self-exiles to Crete. However, he returned one day unexpectedly and the Pallantides decided to take over the throne permanently. Therefore, they form two teams and declared war. The first team threads alongside Pallas, waiting for Theseus at the southeastern gate of Hymettus at Sphettos, while the second one sets an ambush at the northeastern gate at Gargittos, in case Thiseas decided to fight against their father. However, their plans fail when he is informed the forerunner Leo and by one surprising attack he manages to extinguish his enemies at Gargittos and at the same time scatter the other team. Theseus now may permanently state his predominance over the city of Athens and gain his citizens' respect once again.

=== Christian and Byzantine Times ===
During the Christian and Byzantine times, Attica is decayed, although there are some findings that indicate the existence of settlements at that time. In particular, one may come across the Saint Dimitrios' church at Aitolias Street, Saint George's church at Attica Street, Agion Panton at Saint Nektarios Street, Saint John Theologos at Miaoulis Street. In addition, ruins of the Saint Nikolaos church are found on top of the Pallene Athena sanctuary and a marble lion. Since the 5th century BC until the Roman conquest, findings around Stavros indicate the colonization of the area. Recent excavations at a prehistoric graveyard at Fouresi Hill brought to light ruins of a palaiochristian temple that proves the existence of a Christian community.

=== Latin Empire ===
Arvanite mercenaries from Northern Epirus were sent to Mesogea to protect the Duchy of Athens which was established in 1205 by the Franks, after the conquest of Constantinople during the Fourth Crusade. Arvanites reinforce the working population, while later they bring their families along and root in the Mesogea area, to which they bring their language, customs and place names.

=== Ottoman domination ===
The Duchy of Athens is preserved until the conquest of the athenians by the Turks in 1456, after a historical course of 251 years. Attica natives and arvanites lose their land and are violently separated by their children. The settlement that is set at the location of ancient Paiania is named "Liopesi", an arvanitic name, whereas many neighbourhoods preserve their Byzantine names.

== Historical monuments (post-Byzantine) ==
- The church of St. George the «Chostos», hermitage of St. Timothy in Gargettus-Γαργηττός. A wall painting monument (1727) of George Markou the Argus, the great and prolific post-Byzantine ecclesiastic iconographer of the 18th century. ("....Nel 1727, Marcou si trova di nuovo ad Atene, dove assume l’agiografia dei Templi di San Giorgio di Chostu (eremitaggio)...." Evangelos Andreou https://ketlib.lib.unipi.gr/xmlui/handle/ket/849

=== Middle Ages ===
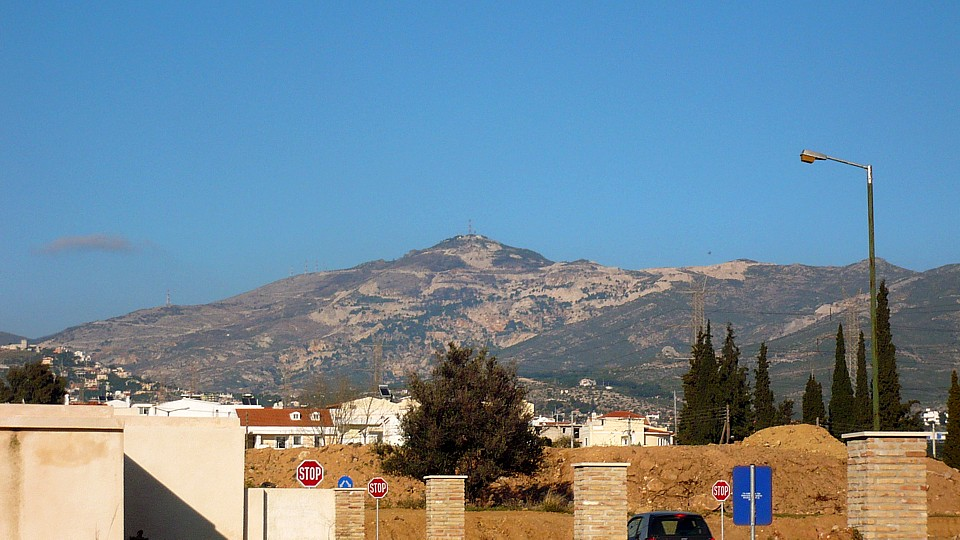
The Penteli Mountain

Gerakas is closely connected with the history of the Penteliko, as the wider landscape was a nest of religious activity but pastoral as well. When the Great Penteli Monastery is established by Saint Timotheos in 1578, the Saint Nikolaos church at Gargittos is used for asceticism, while other churches are also set at the region. This specific area is called Karyttos, a place for the monks to rest, but a place for the Sarakatsani shepherds to graze too. The shepherds used to bring their animals from Penteli where they lived and worked during the summertime, down to Gerakas during the cold winter nights. In his attempt to give financial independence to the monastery, Saint Timotheos bought pieces of the land around, displacing the shepherds away to a place called Labrika, near modern Koropi. This fact led Timotheos and other land owners to conflicts, such as Saint Philothei from Athens. Some Pieces of the land were claimed were owned by the Great Logothetis Ierakas, which he gave to the monastery, whereas Philothei regained the pieces that she owned. Afterwards, some Sarakatsani and Arvanites Koropiotes returned to work at the fields, after the disputes were over.

=== Hellenic State ===
During the years of the Hellenic independence, in 1835 the Municipality of Myrinous of the province of Attica is established by the Decree BD of 1 October (FEK 17) and the seat is located at the settlement of Liopesi, center of the ancient trittys of Paiania. The name Myrinous comes from the coastal deme that is located at modern Markopoulo. The new municipality covers almost the whole Mesogean plain and hardly presents 431 residents. During the next years, there are gradual merges of new settlements, whereas in 1840 by the Decree B.D. of 30 August the Municipality of Kekropia is established, merging the Municipalities of Myrinous and Arafin. Seat of the new municipality is the village Koursallas, modern Koropi. The name of the municipality comes from the ancient deme of Kekropia that was named after its hero and first king of Athens, Cecrops I. By the Decree B.D. of 14 July 1842, the municipality is renamed as Kropia, due to objections from the Greek archaeological services that state "mistakenly the municipality behind Ymittos was named Kekropia. Such [a] name never existed according to older and recent geographers, but the ancient Greeks called Kechropian the Acropolis and a part lying between Eleusina and Aharnes."

By the Decree B.D. of 6 October 1847 (FEK 34), the seat of the municipality is transferred from Koropi to Markopoulon, another village near the coast. The land of modern Gerakas is covered by cultivated fields used by the Arvanites and native residents of Liopesi, Charvati and Kantza who live and work at the Mesogean plain. By the Decree B.D. of 27 January 1905 (FEK 18), the settlement of Charvati is named after its ancient ancestor, Pallini. The borders between Paiania and Pallini are not easily distinguished and expand vertically upon the land of ancient Pallini, up to the first hills of Pentelikon, at the land of ancient Gargittos. This administrative line of Paiania (descendant of the village Liopesi) run up to the B Zone of Ymittos, a beautiful slope of the mountain covered by pine trees and fresh water wells and significant as well as located at the entrance of the Athens basin.

=== Modern Gerakas ===
On a more recent administrative model, Paiania and the neighbouring municipalities are subsumed within the prefecture of East Attica. At the same time, Pallini alongside Kantza border on "Upper Paiania" that is basically built around the Stavros church at the most northeastern part of the Ymittos mountain, near Agia Paraskevi. The houses are scattered around and lie between the farmlands of the Paianians.

In 1966, a small settlement near the Lavriou Avenue, connecting Athens with Lavrium, among the pits, tries unsuccessfully for a secession from Paiania, in order to be recognized as Commune of Glyka Nera. Meanwhile, another settlement of Makedones and Ipirotes in 1967 near the old railway station at the land of Gerakas give an effort for the establishment of a Commune of Gerakas, with no success as well. A local committee is constituted and visits the prefecture office with a demand of the commune establishment. Their demand is turned down again.

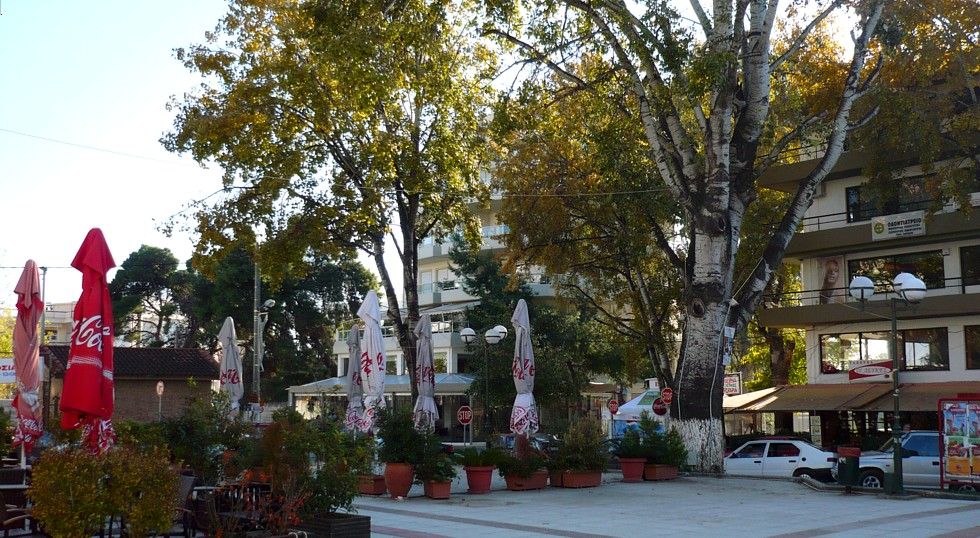
Modern Gerakas

Meanwhile, their western neighbours at Agia Paraskevi meet an unexpected urban development and a great population growth coming from Athens, up to the northern part of the mountain. Pallini on the other corner of the mountain seems to have established its historical seat of its ancestor, near Kantza and Paiania seems to be cut off from the Athens entrance. In 1969, the Commune of Glyka Nera is a reality, an area that cuts off the lands of Gerakas to the north from the village of Paiania to the south.

In 1974 another gathering of Gerakiotes takes place and after the police gives their permission, they visit a lawyer and constitute the memorandum of the new administrative entity they desire to create.

In 1980 approval is granted by the East Attica Prefecture and the new commune is born. The administrative borders of Gerakas enclose parts of the Stavros settlement around the Army's Hill, as well as the droughty fields of the southern hills of Penteli up to the marble workshops and the scattered industries. An informal local poll takes place for the name of the new commune, among the names of the three settlements of Gerakas, Stavros and Gargittos and they decide to name it Gerakas.

== Demographics ==
Since 2001 and especially after the great transportation works that have been completed, Gerakas had a rapid growth in population, mostly Athenians leaving the center of the metropolitan area.

Year	Population
1981	6,703
1991	8,512
2001	13,921
2011	29,939
2021	33,856

sources:ESYE, Municipality of Gerakas

== Transportation ==
2004 was a significant date for the area, as the Athens Olympic Games left an enormous heritage to the city. Some of the great works completed are the Attiki Odos, the Ymittos Circuital Road, as well as the Doukissis Plakentias and Pallini Metro and Suburban Railway stations. In addition, the Marathonos Avenue was widened and the Spaton Avenue was recreated. The great transportational works give the spark for mass construction of the farmlands which are cut into small fields, while the building activity gave an architectural uniformity to the city.

== Land prices ==
The land of Gerakas is separated into five zones for valuation purposes. The tax values are common to those of Pallini and Glika Nera, fluctuating in 2006 between €1,050 to 1,300 / m^{2}, whereas in 2007 they present an increase of 19% to 19,23% reaching €1,250 to 1,550 / m^{2}. However, due to great demand, the market values break the dam of €2,000 / m^{2}, reaching the €2,200 to 2,800 / m^{2}, similar to the values of the neighbouring northeastern suburbs of Athens.

== Government and politics ==
Spiros Giannakou was the first president of Gerakas, whereas Giannis Papadogeorgakis and Athanasios Zoutsos ensue up to the modern administrative era of the city.

During the recent years, Gerakas is trying to balance between the variant forms of development and its urbanization, while it seems to "flirt" with the borders of the Athens metropolitan city. Some of the city's conveniencies are the easy connection between the Athens basin and the East Attica plain, the significant location between the two Attica mountains and the modern architecture. Among the problems the municipality faces are the delay of the excretory system and some bungling of the street layout. The city recently participated at the SPAP organization as the 23rd member, which aims to protect and recreate the wounded mountain of Penteli, as well as the Marathonios Anaptyksiaki, which aims to the development of the northern mesogea municipalities. A significant role is also attributed to the local cultural union of "Pigi" that tries to help the city to be known and developed.

== See also ==
- List of municipalities of Attica
