= National roads to airports in Greece =

Throughout Greece, there are short sections of national roads that connect airports or air bases to the rest of the national or provincial road network. There are 14 national roads of this type: 13 were introduced on 9 July 1963, while another in Rhodes was added in 1998.

== List of national roads to airports ==
=== National Road 28 ===
National Road 28 (Greek: Εθνική Οδός 28) runs from the EO1 in Eastern Larissa, to Larissa National Airport. From 9 August 1955 until 1963, it was known as the EO84.

=== National Road 40 ===
National Road 40 (Εθνική Οδός 40) runs from the EO5 at Agrinio, to Agrinion Airport. From 1955 until 1963, it was known as the EO89.

=== National Road 46 ===
National Road 46 (Εθνική Οδός 46) runs from the A1 motorway to Tanagra Air Base, passing through Schimatari. Formerly known as the EO86 from 1955 until 1963, it became part of the tertiary national road network on 15 December 1995.

=== National Road 58 ===
National Road 58 (Εθνική Οδός 58) runs from EO8 and EO8a in Eastern Elefsina to Elefsina Air Base. Formerly known as the EO83 from 1955 until 1963, it became part of the tertiary national road network on 15 December 1995.

=== National Road 60 ===
National Road 60 (Εθνική Οδός 60) runs from EO8, roughly halfway between Nea Peramos and Megara, to Megara Air Base. Formerly known as the EO90 from 1955 until 1963, it became part of the tertiary national road network on 15 December 1995.

=== National Road 67 ===
National Road 67 (Εθνική Οδός 67) runs from the EO16 west of Thermi, to the Hellenic Air Force entrance of Thessaloniki Airport. Formerly one of two branches of the old EO40 from 1955 until 1963, it became part of the secondary national road network on 15 December 1995. The EO67 also connects with the A242 expressway, another airport road from the A24 west of Nea Raidestos towards the passenger entrance.

=== National Road 71 ===
National Road 71 (Εθνική Οδός 71) runs from the EO30 west of Nea Anchialos, to the Hellenic Air Force entrance of Nea Anchialos National Airport. Formerly known as the EO85 from 1955 until 1963, it became part of the tertiary national road network on 15 December 1995.

=== National Road 72 ===
National Road 72 (Εθνική Οδός 72) runs from the EO74 in Tripoli, to Tripoli Airport at Agios Konstantinos. Formerly known as the EO94 from 1955 until 1963, it became part of the tertiary national road network on 15 December 1995.

On 15 February 2025, the road that the EO72 follows was renamed after Hellenic Air Force pilot Marios-Michail Touroutsikas (1993–30 January 2023).

=== National Road 78 ===
National Road 78 (Εθνική Οδός 78) runs from the EO9 north of Andravida, to Andravida Air Base. From 1955 until 1963, it was known as the EO87.

=== National Road 80 ===
National Road 80 (Εθνική Οδός 80) runs from the EO82 west of Kalami, towards Triodos Airport (a former air base now used for recreational flying). From 1955 until 1963, it was known as the EO95.

=== National Road 88 ===
National Road 88 (Εθνική Οδός 88) runs from Rhodes Provincial Road 2 at Kremasti, to Rhodes Air Base. Formerly known as the EO92 from 1955 until 1963, it became part of the secondary national road network on 15 December 1995.

=== National Road 92 ===
National Road 92 (Εθνική Οδός 92) runs from the EO90 west of Hersonissos, to Kasteli Air Base, passing though Kastelli and connecting with the A90 motorway. Formerly known as the EO93 from 1955 until 1963, it became part of the tertiary national road network on 15 December 1995. Most of the road is being upgraded to a dual carriageway for the new Kasteli International Airport.

=== National Road 94 ===
National Road 94 (Εθνική Οδός 94) runs from the EO90 in Chania, to Chania International Airport. Formerly known as the EO88 from 1955 until 1963, it became part of the tertiary national road network on 15 December 1995.

=== Vrysia–Rhodes Airport National Road ===
The National Road to Rhodes International Airport (Εθνική Οδός Βρυσιάς - Αεροδρομίου) branches off the EO95 at Vrysia, crossing the EO88 at Pastida. First recorded in 1998, it was numbered the EO100 for statistical purposes by the National Statistical Service of Greece (ESYE).

== Former airport roads ==
From 1955 until 1963, the EO91 used to be a national airport road from Kato Achaia to Patras Araxos Airport: in 1963, it was renumbered the EO64, becoming a regular national road between the EO9 and the village of Araxos.

== Map ==
Map of national roads to airports in Greece

== See also ==
- A64 motorway (Greece), an airport road from Koropi to Athens International Airport
