= Attiki Odos =

System of highways around Athens, Greece

Attiki Odos
- Αττική Οδός
- Attiki Odos motorways, highlighted in green

Route information
- Maintained by Nea Attiki Odos
- Length: 50.08 km (31.12 mi) (Mainline, A6): 14.85 km (9.23 mi)—A62; 3.61 km (2.24 mi)—A621; 6.11 km (3.80 mi)—A64; 4.39 km (2.73 mi)—A65
- Component highways: A6 (E94) from Elefsina to Markopoulo; A62 from Katechaki Avenue to Pallini; A621 from Agia Paraskevi to Doukissis Plakentias; A64 from Koropi to Athens International Airport; A65 from Ano Liosia to Aspropyrgos

Major junctions
- East end: A8 in Elefsina
- West end: EO89 in Markopoulo

Location
- Country: Greece
- Regions: Attica
- Major cities: Athens

Highway system
- Highways in Greece; Motorways; National Roads

Attiki Odos (Greek: Αττική Οδός) (Attica Road) is a toll motorway system in Greece. The Attiki Odos motorways form the outer beltways of the Greater Athens metropolitan area. The total length of the motorways is 70 kilometres (43 mi). The Attiki Odos system currently consists of the following motorways:

- A6: Eleusis - Athens International Airport
- A62 (Ymittos Ring): Katechaki Avenue - Pallini
- A621: Doukissis Plakentias Avenue - Agia Paraskevi
- A64: Koropi - Athens International Airport
- A65 (Aigaleo Ring): Skaramagas - Ano Liosia

== History ==
Construction of the A6 motorway began in 1996. Part of it was opened, along with the Eleftherios Venizelos International Airport to which it connects, in March 2001.

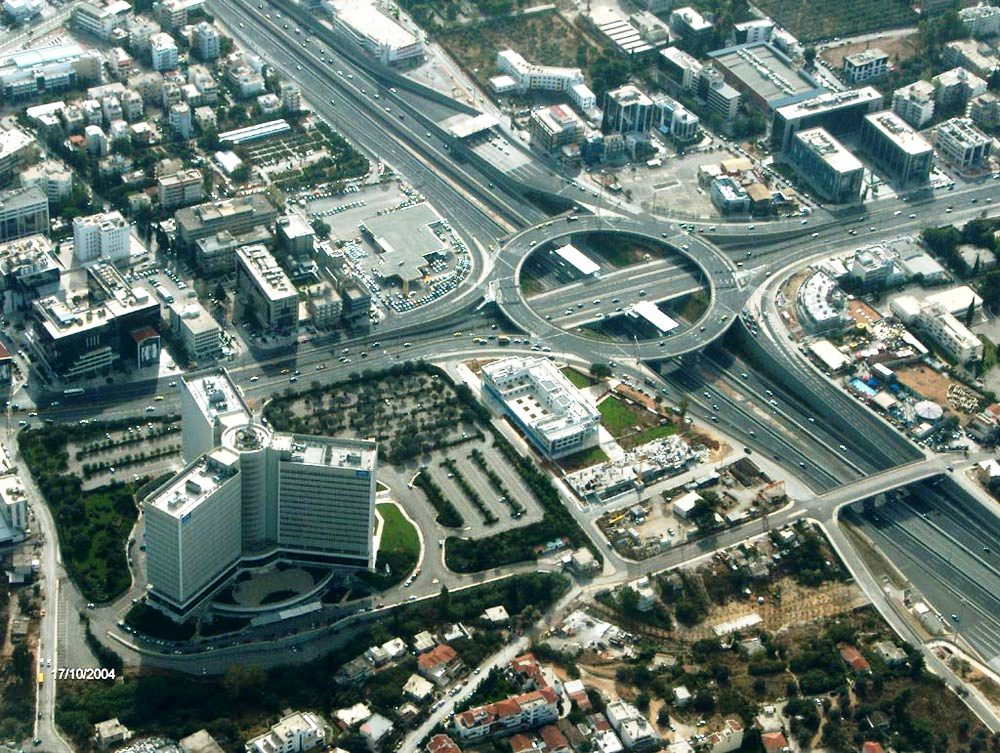
Highway interchange in the northern suburb of Maroussi.

In early 2003, the A6 was opened from Kifisias Avenue Interchange to Eleftherios Venizelos Airport; the Ymittos Ring was almost paved by this time, and tunnels were already complete. On 3 September 2003, the Ymittos Ring opened. This part of the motorway runs in the northern part of the Hymettus hills and bypassed Mesogeion Avenue and linked to Kifissou Avenue and its suburbs, and the Airport along with the eastern suburbs of Athens.

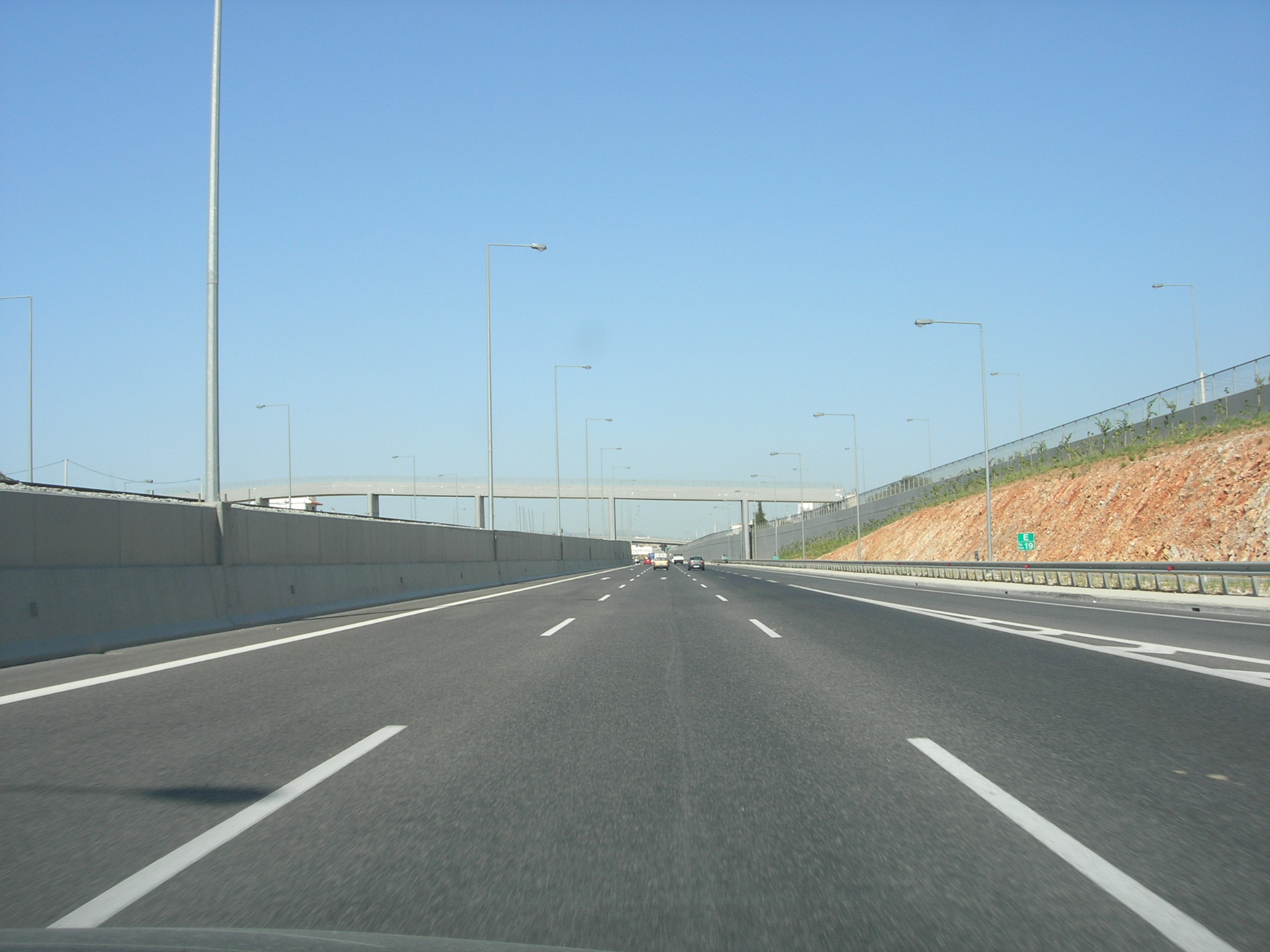
Westbound to Elefsina.

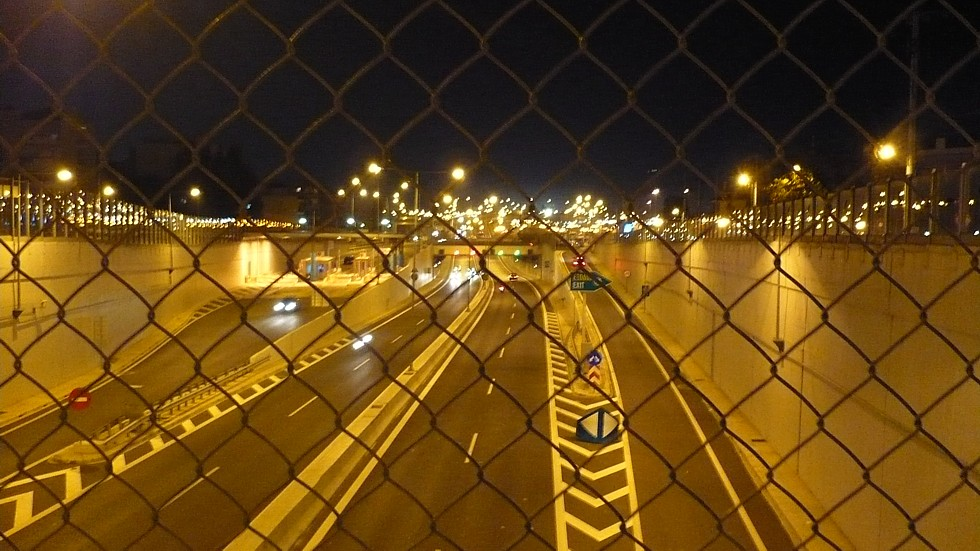
Attiki Odos at night.

In November 2003, the western part opened from the junction with A8 motorway to Kifisias Avenue. In April 2004, a small 2.5 km section opened, connecting the Ymittos Ring to the westbound direction of the A6.

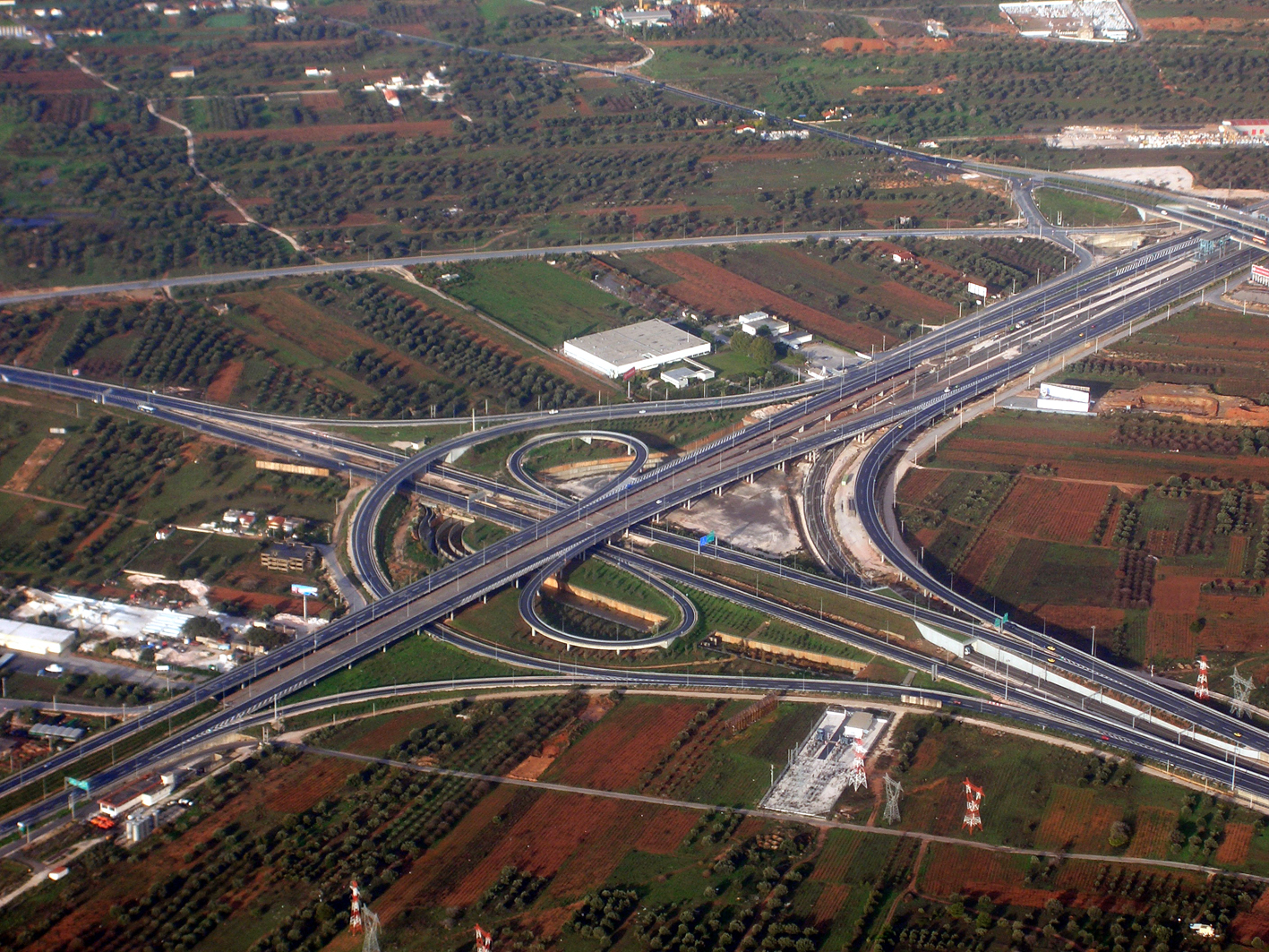
Interchange at the Attiki Odos Airport Entrance.

== Safety ==
Attiki Odos is considered one of the safest motorways in Europe. Its design used strict safety-related technical specifications, including updated hard shoulders in both directions and high quality skid-resistant asphalt pavement, dense lighting and fencing. Attiki Odos has hundreds of CCTV cameras connected to the Traffic Management Centre (TMC), which detects any incidents occurring on the motorway and informs the intervention and maintenance patrol units to provide assistance. Other sophisticated safety systems include:

- Road pavement sensors
- Carbon monoxide measurement systems installed in tunnels
- TETRA system for communication with the patrol units
- Electronic variable message signs
- Automatic tunnel ventilation systems

== Operation and maintenance ==
Nea Attiki Odos is the current operator of Attiki Odos: it replaced Attiki Odos S.A. as the network's concessionaire on 6 October 2024.

Since 8 October 2024, Nea Attiki Odos is a consortium of GEK Terna as the majority shareholder (90%), and Marianna Latsis (via Latsco Direct Investments) as a minority (10%). Nea Attiki Odos' predecessor, Attiki Odos S.A, was a consortium of: Aktor Concessions, then part of Ellaktor (65.75%); the Avax Group (34.21%, of which 10.02% was held by their subsidiary ETETH); and Egis Projects (0.04%).

=== Tolls ===
Article 50 of the concession contract, as ratified by Law 2445/1996, requires drivers to pay a toll to use the A6, A62 (Hymettus Ring Road) and A621. The toll, paid once when entering the motorways, is the same regardless of distance travelled, but depends on the vehicle category and payment method: as of 17 August 2024, the single journey toll is €1.40 for motorbikes, €2.80 for cars and vans, €7.10 for trucks and buses, and €11.30 for heavy goods vehicles.

Drivers can pay by cash, credit or debit card, e-pass or a special account card: e-pass transponders from other motorways are accepted under the Greek Interoperable Tolling System (GRITS), which was introduced in 2012 and expanded nationwide in November 2020.

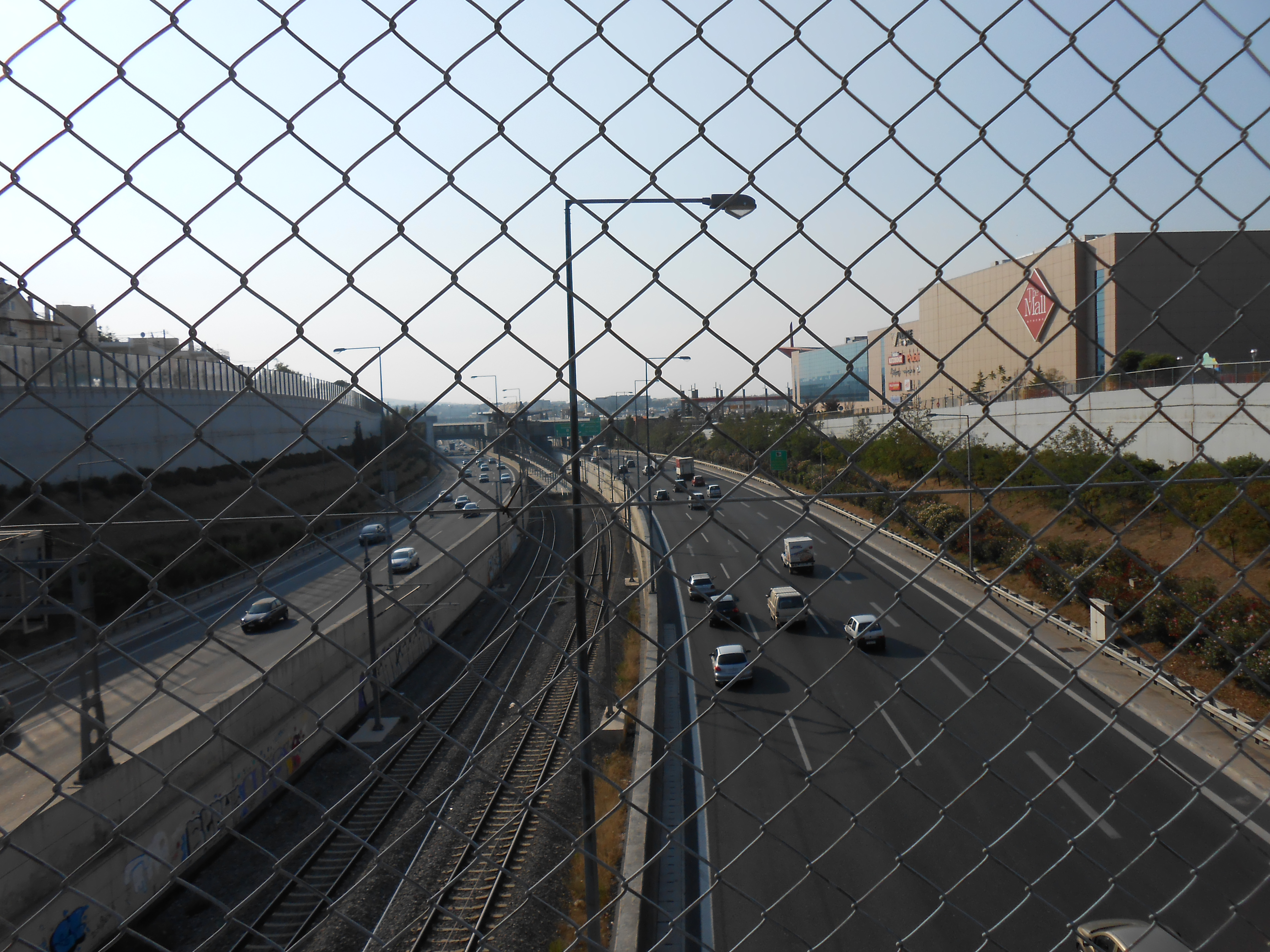
Attiki Odos coming through Maroussi Metropolitan Suburb, outside Athens Mall.

== Expansion plans ==
In 2001, the same year the first section of the motorway was delivered, the discussion about the extension of the motorway first opened, but the plans remained unimplemented for many years.

On October 21, 2005 a new expansion plan was proposed. 76 km of motorway was to be constructed, bringing the total length to 141 km. Extensions were to be constructed towards Rafina, Lavrio and Vouliagmeni. The Hymettus Beltway was also to be extended southwards to Vouliagmeni, in the area of Elliniko. In 2010 and 2013 alterations in the original planning were made and more extensions were proposed.

As of 2019, the expansion plan under discussion includes the extensions to Rafina and Lavrio ports, the extension of Kymis Avenue up to the A1 motorway, the extension of Hymettus western ring road to Vouliagmenis Avenue, as well as the extension of Suburban Railway to Lavrio, but these projects have not begun construction yet.
