= Katechaki Avenue =

Major road in Athens

Katechaki or Katehaki Avenue (Greek: Λεωφόρος Κατεχάκη, Leoforos Katechaki) is one of the main roads in Athens. Its total length is approximately 12 to 13 km.

== About the avenue ==
The avenue begins by an interchange with the Mesogeiou Avenue which was constructed in the 1970s, the avenue forms an intersection with the road to Zografou and Olof Palme Street and north to Papagou. By the avenue with a stretch of 2 km features industrial buildings, shops and office complexes constructed between the 1970s and the 1990s. Since 2004, it has an interchange with the Attiki Odos with two lanes of exits and 300 m north, its first toll station. The avenue enters the Hymettus' forest filled with pine, spruce, fir (Greek Fir) and cypress trees. It later enters an interchange with the University of Athens and a road to the top of the mountain along with communications tower which is not used during the nighttime hours. The avenue ends by Karea Avenue.

The avenue serves as the bypass of Athens connecting traffic from its northern, the western, the eastern and the southern suburbs along with Vouliagmenis Avenue.

== History ==
The avenue was under construction in the late-1950s and first opened in the 1960s. Traffic lights were installed later on and an interchange with the Mesogeiou Avenue was added later. Between 2001 and 2004, its interchange with the ring was under construction and opened later. It was used in July 2004 for the bus that carried players of the Greece national football team from the city's airport down to Kallimarmaro for its celebration of the victory and its claim to the Euro 2004 title after beating Portugal, fans were alongside the avenue in large numbers.

On Monday July 16, 2007, the entire stretch heading outside Athens from Attiki Odos was shut down with a stretch of 5 km to traffic due to that a forest fire not naturally caused ravaged the western slopes of the Ymittos and its forests and its smoke blanketed most of that part of the avenue. Fire trucks arrived to battle the fire which happened on a hilltop near the avenue. The fire occurred between 3 PM (15:00) and a few hours before sunset, its flames did not burn its signs and streetlights. Several cars were stranded but it escaped the fiery phemonemon. The avenue was later reopened to traffic.

== Intersections ==
- Hymettus Ring, part of the A62 motorway
- Mesogeiou Avenue, part of the EO54
- Roads to Zografou along with Olof Palme Street and Ymittou Street
- Interchange with the University of Athens and its communications tower (authorized personnel only) for the eastbound lanes
- Karea Avenue
