= Aegaleus =

Aegaleus can refer to:

- Aegaleus (bug), a genus of stink bugs or shield bugs
- Egaleo or Aigaleo, a municipality in Attica, Greece
- Egaleo (mountain), a mountain
