= A64 motorway (Greece) =

Road in Greece

A64 motorway
- Αυτοκινητόδρομος Α64
- Route of the A64 motorway, in green
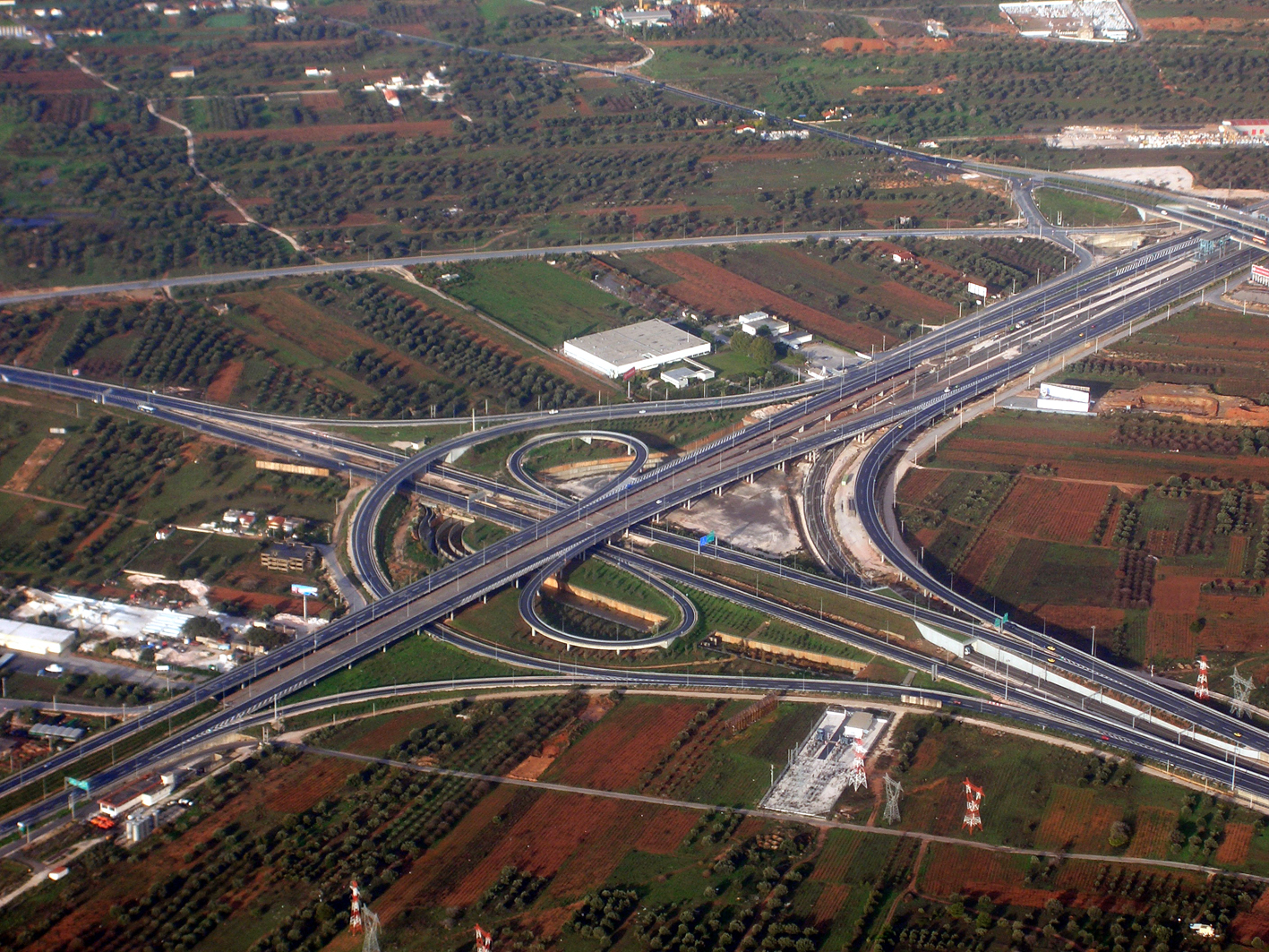
- The junction of the A64 and A6 near Koropi

Route information
- Length: 6 km (3.7 mi)

Major junctions
- West end: Koropi (A6)
- East end: Athens International Airport

Location
- Country: Greece
- Regions: Attica
- Primary destinations: Koropi; Athens International Airport

Highway system
- Highways in Greece; Motorways; National roads
← A621	→ A65

The A64 motorway (Greek: Αυτοκινητόδρομος Α64), formerly signed as the A62 motorway until 2024, is a short toll-free branch the A6 Attiki Odos motorway, which connects the Athens International Airport with the highway. Its length is 6 km (4 mi) and it serves as the main route to the Athens International Airport.

On 4 December 2015, the Greek government proposed to renumber the A62 as the A64: In practice, the renumbering had not taken place until 2024 and road signs still used to show the motorway as the A62. As of July 2024, the renumbering is being implemented as a result of motorway signs being replaced.

== Exit list ==
Regional unit	km	mi	Exit	Name	Destinations	Notes
Kropia	47.16	29.30	—	Koropi	Lavrio, Sounion, Markopoulo Glyfada, Vari, Koropi Spata, Paiania	Intersection
Kropia	48.39	30.07	20	Airport	A6 / E94 – Elefsina, Athens A6 / E94 – Markopoulo	No northbound exit or southbound entrance, to and from Markopoulo
Kropia	49.56	30.80	Κ1	South Gate	Local roads Athens International Airport (southbound turn-back)	
Paiania	50.59	31.44	Northern limit of Attiki Odos; southern limit of Athens International Airport			
Paiania	51.29	31.87	—	Cargo–Airport Services	Cargo, Airport services, Retail park	
Paiania	52.04	32.34	—	Departures–Arrivals	Short-term parking (P_{1}), Long-term parking (P_{3}), Car rental A, Technical base, Exhibition centre Departures–Arrivals, Short-term parking (P_{2}), Car rental B	
1.000 mi = 1.609 km; 1.000 km = 0.621 mi: Incomplete access
