= A6 motorway (Greece) =

Part of Attiki Odos in Attica region, Greece

A6 motorway
- Αυτοκινητόδρομος Α6
- Attiki Odos
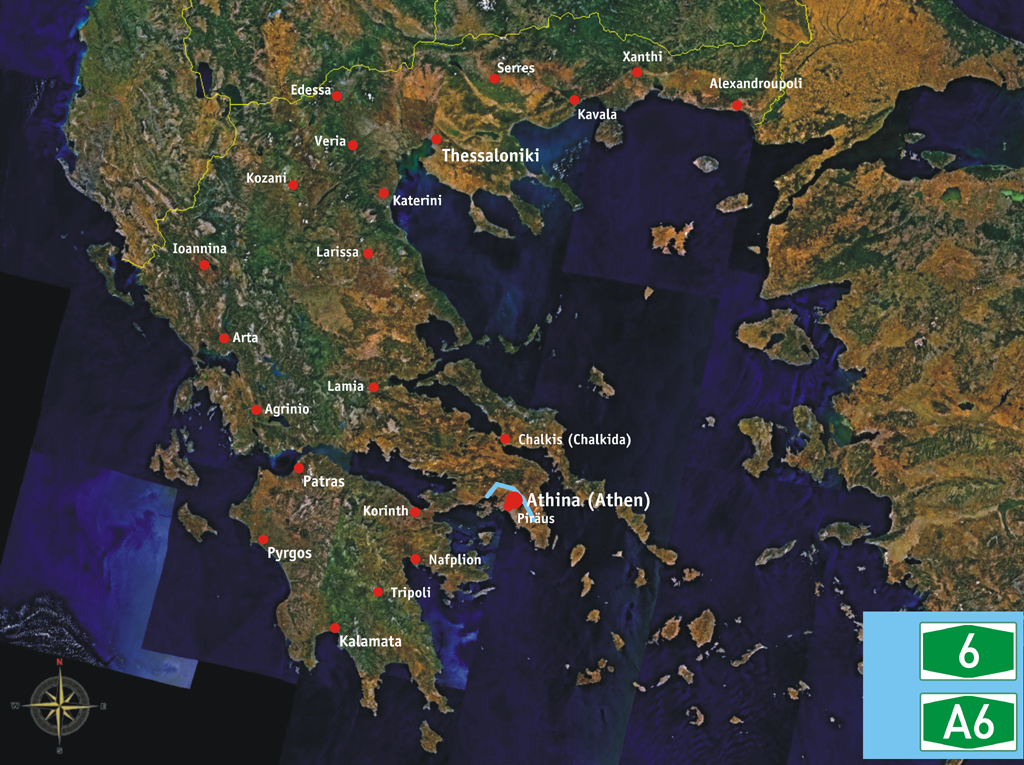

Route information
- Part of E94
- Length: 48 km (30 mi)

Major junctions
- West end: Elefsina (A8)
- East end: Markopoulo

Location
- Country: Greece
- Regions: Attica
- Primary destinations: Elefsina; Gerakas (Stavros); Markopoulo

Highway system
- Highways in Greece; Motorways; National roads
← A52	→ A62

The A6 motorway, also known as the Attiki Odos (Greek: Αττική Οδός), is a toll motorway in Greece that forms the backbone of the motorway system in Athens, also known as the Attiki Odos after the concessionaire. Connecting Eleusis in the west with the Athens International Airport in the east, it forms the northern beltway of Athens. The length of the motorway is 48 kilometres (30 mi).

== History ==
Construction of the motorway began in 1996. Part of the motorway was opened along with the Eleftherios Venizelos International Airport to which it connects, in 2001. It started from the Gerakas interchange and led to the airport.

In September 2002, construction of the Athens Suburban Railway railway started, in the large median of the motorway. The railway was opened in 2004. In early 2003, the A6 was opened from the Kifisias Avenue Interchange to Eleftherios Venizelos Airport. In November 2003, the western part opened from the junction with the A8 to Kifisias Avenue.

== Tolls ==
Toll stations are located at the interchanges leading to the Attiki Odos motorway and the toll fare is paid when entering the motorway. The fare is the same regardless of the length of journey but depends on vehicle category. Drivers can pay either by cash, e-pass or a special account card; for motorbikes and cars the standard toll fares are €1.25 and €2.50 respectively.

== Exit list ==
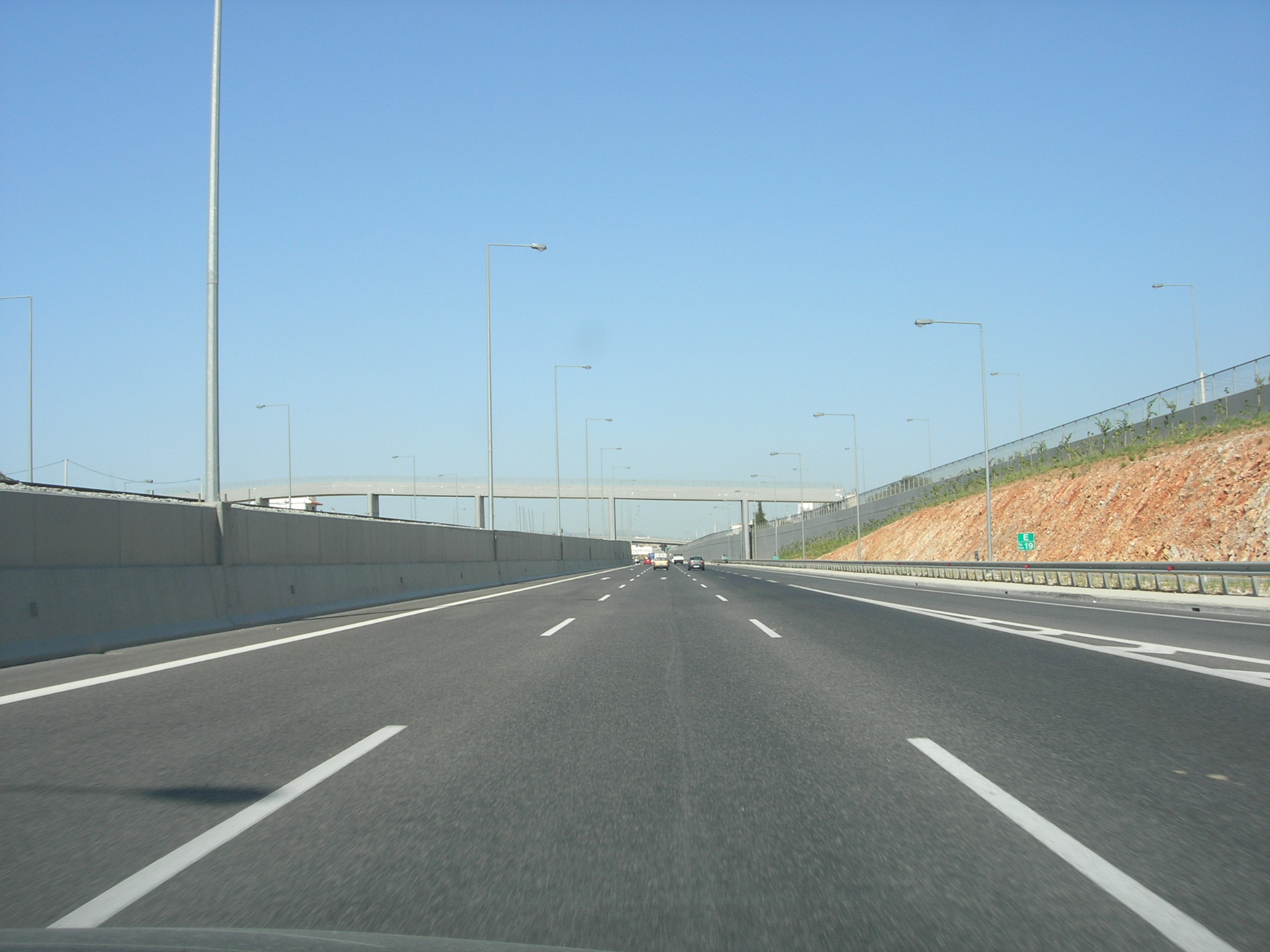
Westbound to Elefsina

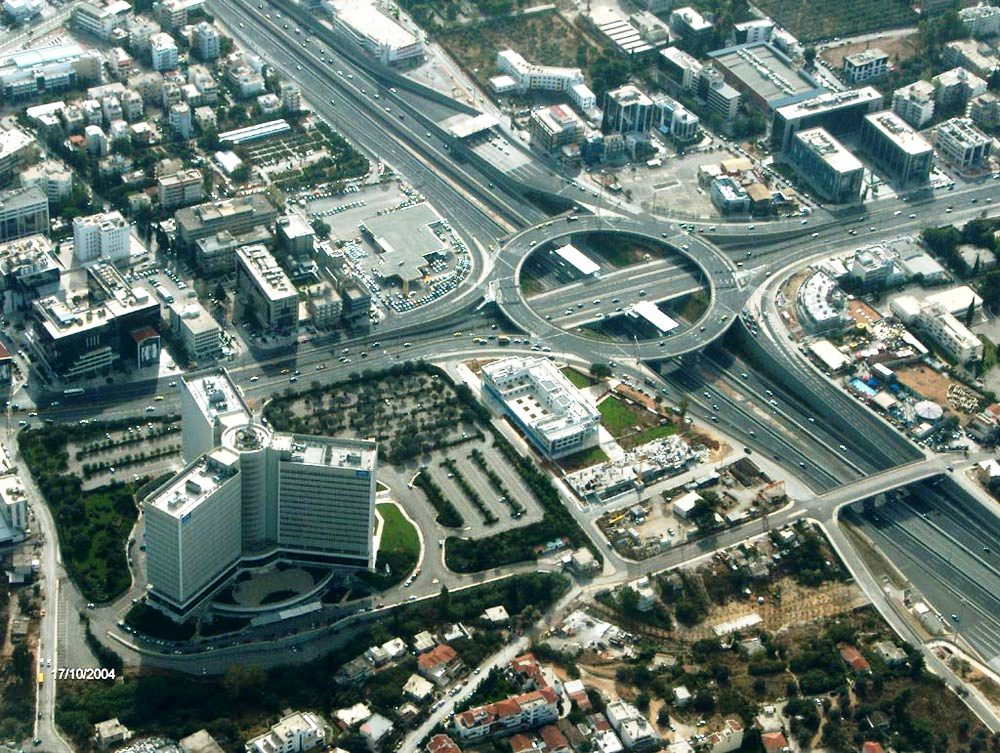
Highway interchange 11 in the northern suburb of Marousi.

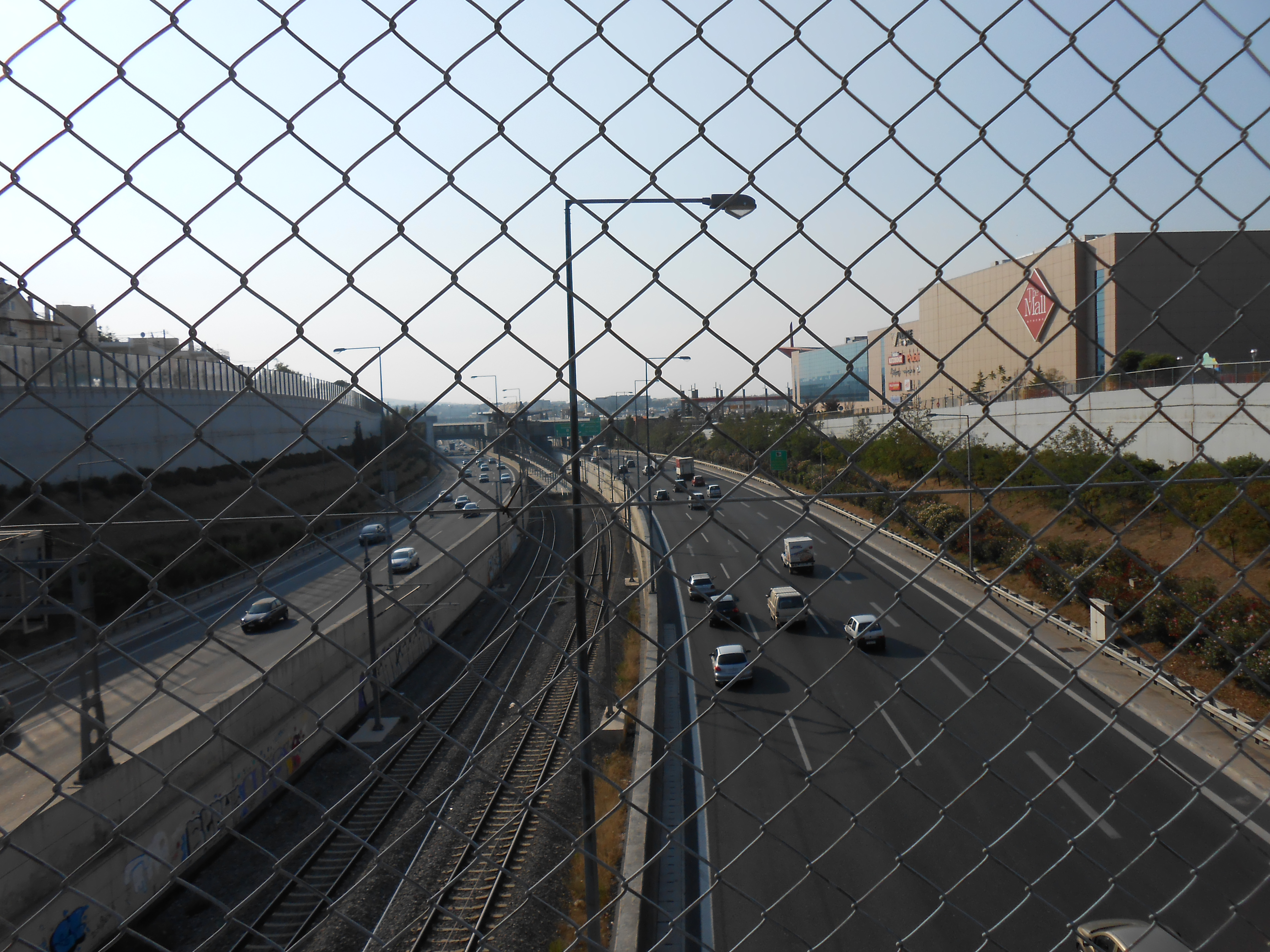
Attiki Odos coming through Marousi, outside Athens Mall.

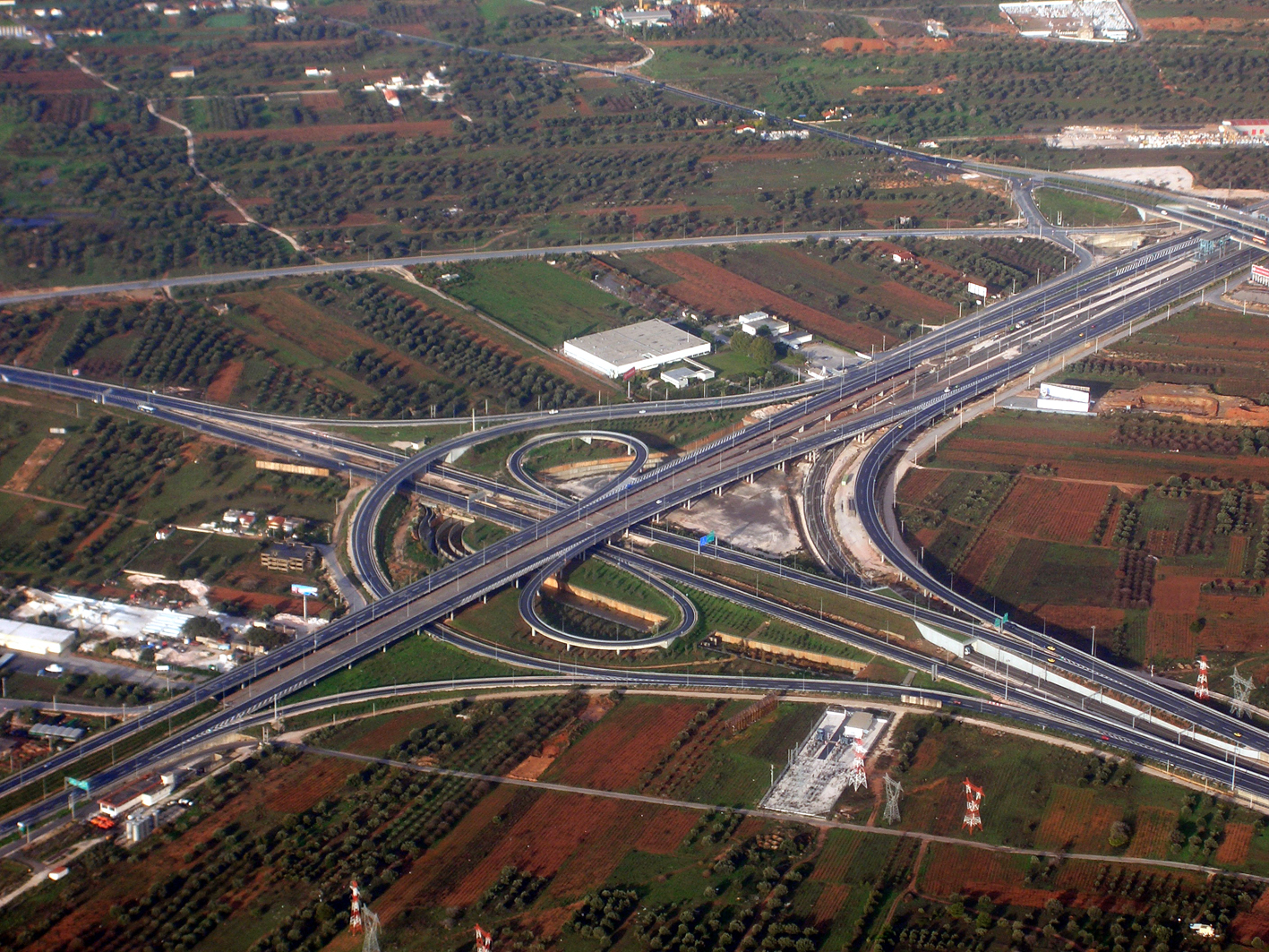
Interchange at the Attiki Odos Airport Entrance

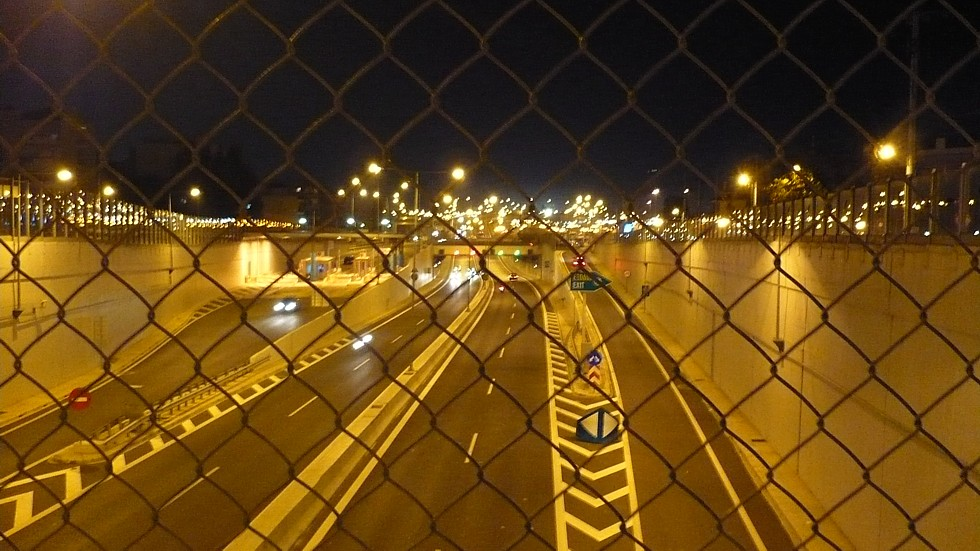
Attiki Odos at night

The exits of the A6 motorway:

Notes
Under construction
Planned

Regional unit	Exit	Name	Destinations	Notes/Also as
West Attica		Eleusis interchange	A8 E94 to Corinth, Patras	Western terminus of the A6
West Attica	1	Mandra	EO3 E962 to Erithrai	E94
West Attica	2	Magoula		E94
West Attica	3	Agios Loukas	A13 to Thebes	Unbuilt
West Attica	4	Aspropyrgos		E94
West Attica	5	Egaleo interchange	Egaleo Beltway	E94
West Attica	6	Filis Ave., Ano Liosia		E94
West Attica	7	Dimokratis Ave., Acharnes		E94
North Athens	8	Metamorfosi interchange	A1 E75 to Lamia, Piraeus	E94
North Athens	9	Irakleio		E94
North Athens	10	Kymis Avenue		E94
North Athens	11	Kifisias Avenue, Marousi	EO83 to Kifissia	E94
North Athens	12	Pentelis Avenue		E94
North Athens	13	D. Plakentias Avenue interchange	A621	E94
East Attica	14	Anthousa		E94
East Attica	15	Marathonos Ave., Pallini	EO54 to Rafina	E94
East Attica	16/Y7	Leontario interchange	A62 to Kaisariani	E94
East Attica	17	Kantza		E94
East Attica	18	Paiania		E94
East Attica	20/K2	Athens International Airport interchange	A64 to Airport	Eastern terminus of the A6
East Attica	Planned motorway to Lavrio			
