= A65 motorway (Greece) =

Road in Greece

A65 motorway
- Αυτοκινητόδρομος Α65
- Route of the A65 motorway, in green

Route information
- Length: 10 km (6.2 mi)

Major junctions
- North end: Ano Liosia
- South end: Aspropyrgos (NATO avenue)

Location
- Country: Greece
- Regions: Attica
- Primary destinations: Ano Liosia; Aspropyrgos (NATO avenue)

Highway system
- Highways in Greece; Motorways; National roads
← A64	→ A7

The A65 motorway, also known as the Egaleo Ring Road (Greek: Περιφερειακή Αιγαλέου), is a motorway in Athens. Part of the Attiki Odos highway system, it branches off the main A6 motorway, serving western Athens. It is named after the Egaleo mountain range it runs parallel to.

The motorway is designed to connect with Greek National Road 8. It remains unfinished; construction of the southernmost 1.4-kilometre (0.87 mi) section near Skaramagas was delayed and is projected for completion in 2028.

== Exit list ==
Municipality	km	mi	Exit	Name	Destinations	Notes
Fyli	15.80	9.82	—	—	Ano Liosia Olympic Hall	Roundabout
Fyli	15.97	9.92	5	Egaleo Ring Road	A6 / E94 – Corinth, Elefsina	No southbound entry or exit, to and from the A6 towards Markopoulo Toll station on southbound exit
Fyli	17.04	10.59	5	Egaleo Ring Road	Markopoulo (A6/E94), ODDY	Southbound exit only
Fyli	17.12	10.64	5	Egaleo Ring Road	A6 / E94 – Markopoulo, Lamia	No northbound exit to the A6 towards Elefsina Toll station on northbound exit
Fyli	19.60	12.18	5Α	NATO	EO – Skaramagas Aspropyrgou Avenue	
Fyli	20.13	12.51	Southern limit of Attiki Odos; continues south as the Egaleo Ring Road to Skaramagas			
1.000 mi = 1.609 km; 1.000 km = 0.621 mi: Incomplete access; Route transition
