= A621 motorway (Greece) =

Road in Greece

A621 motorway
- Αυτοκινητόδρομος Α621
- Route of the A621 motorway, in green

Route information
- Length: 2 km (1.2 mi)

Major junctions
- South end: Gerakas (Stavros, A62)
- North end: Doukissis Plakentias (A6)

Location
- Country: Greece
- Regions: Attica
- Primary destinations: Gerakas (Stavros); Doukissis Plakentias

Highway system
- Highways in Greece; Motorways; National roads
← A62	→ A64

The A621 motorway (Greek: Αυτοκινητόδρομος Α621), formerly signed as the A642 motorway until 2024, is a short motorway in the Athens metropolitan area, Greece. It forms a connection between the A6 motorway (Attiki Odos) to the north, and the A62 motorway (Hymettus Peripheral Road, formerly signed as the A64 motorway) to the east. Its length is 2 km.

On 4 December 2015, the Greek government proposed to renumber the A642 as the A621: In practice, the renumbering had not taken place until 2024, because road signs were still showing the motorway as the A642. As of July 2024, the renumbering is being implemented due to road sign maintenance.

== Route ==
The A621 is officially defined as a connection between the A6 (Attiki Odos) and A62 (Hymettus Ring Road) motorways, running between Agia Paraskevi to the south and Doukissis Plakentias to the north: the entirety of the A621 is tolled, since drivers have to pay a toll on the A6, the A621, or the southern entrances of exits 12 and 13 to access the A621.

=== Exit list ===
Municipality	km	mi	Exit	Name	Destinations	Notes
Agia Paraskevi	5.4	3.4	Υ4	Agia Paraskevi	A62 – Hymettus Ring Road	Northbound entry from and southbound exit to the A62 only
Agia Paraskevi			Agia Paraskevi Tunnel (105 m northbound, 95 m southbound)			
Paiania			Unnamed tunnel (275 m northbound, 205 m southbound)			
Agia Paraskevi			Panagouli Tunnel (500 m)			
Agia Paraskevi	7.16	4.45	13	Doukissis Plakentias	Doukissis Plakentias Avenue (Metro), Irakleitou Road	Toll station on southbound entry
Agia Paraskevi			13	Doukissis Plakentias	Underpass (160 m)	
Chalandri	8.14– 8.27	5.06– 5.14	13	Doukissis Plakentias	Doukissis Plakentias Avenue (Metro) Ano Chalandri, Local roads	
Chalandri	8.06	5.01	12	Penteli	A6 / E94 – Elefsina Pentelis Avenue	Toll station on southbound entry
1.000 mi = 1.609 km; 1.000 km = 0.621 mi: Incomplete access; Tolled
