= Zografou =

Zografou Ζωγράφου Zōgráfou
- Municipality
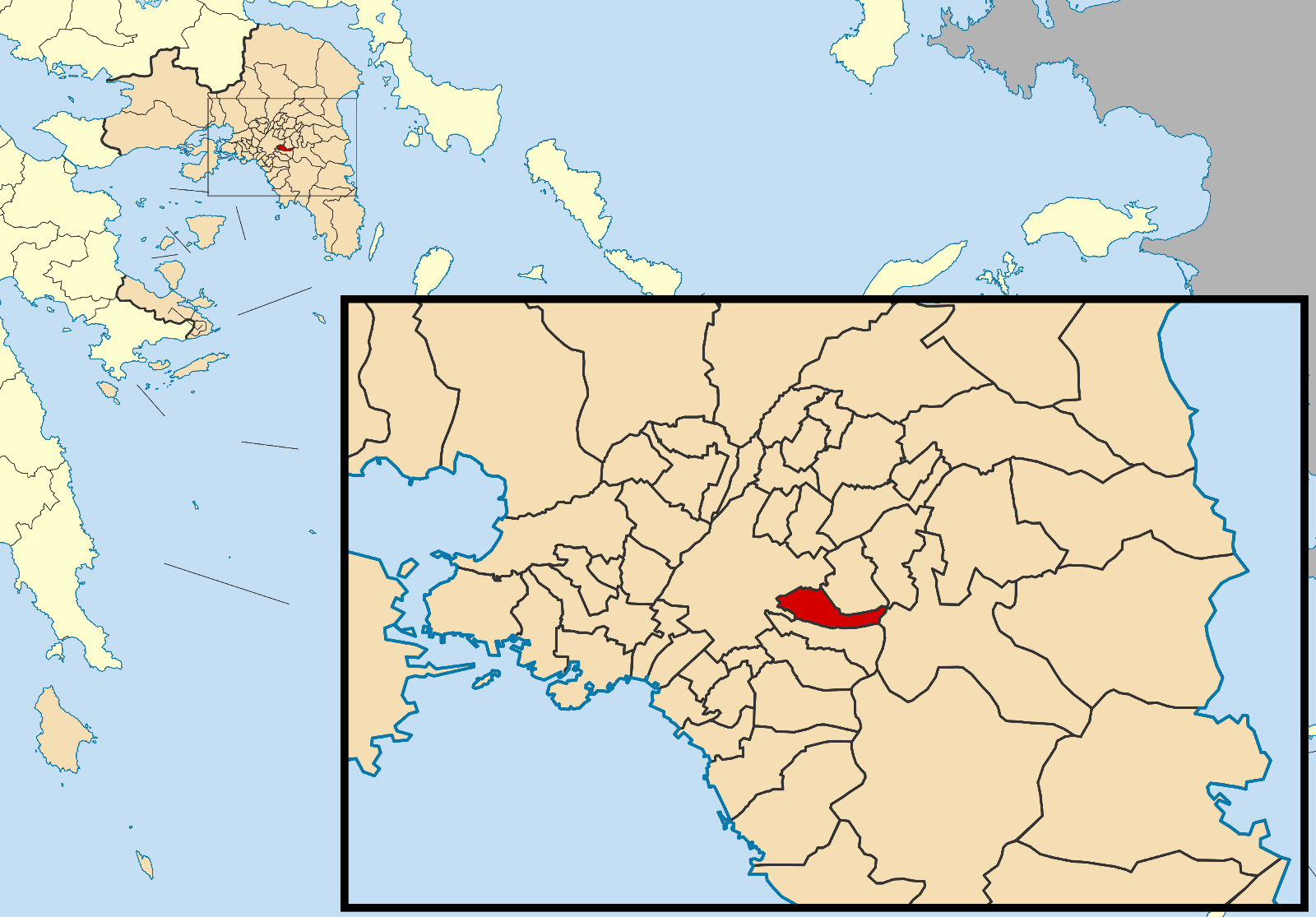

- Location within Greece
- Coordinates: 37°58.7′N 23°46.3′E
- Country: Greece
- Administrative region: Attica
- Regional unit: Central Athens

Government
  - Mayor: Tina Kafatsaki (Syriza; since 2023)

Area
  - Municipality: 8.517 km^{2} (3.288 sq mi)
- Elevation: 130 m (430 ft)

Population (2021)
  - Municipality: 69,874
  - Density: 8,204/km^{2} (21,250/sq mi)
- Time zone: UTC+2 (EET)
  - Summer (DST): UTC+3 (EEST)
- Postal code: 157 xx
- Area code: 210
- Vehicle registration: Z
- Website: www.zografou.gov.gr

Zografou (Greek: Ζωγράφου, romanized: Zōgráfou) is a suburban town of approximately 70,000 inhabitants in the eastern part of the Athens agglomeration, Greece. It was named after the Greek politician Ioannis Zografos. To the east of Zografou lies mount Hymettus. The area, being close to the centre of Athens, developed similar urban sprawl characteristics, with high-rise buildings of even 10 stories tall being the norm. The municipality is also home to the National and Kapodistrian University of Athens and the National Technical University of Athens campuses and a significant percentage of the local population are students, faculty, and employees of both institutions. Zografou includes the smaller areas of Ilissia and Goudi.

== Geography ==
Zografou is a landlocked suburb of Athens, located about 4 km east of Athens city centre. The municipality has an area of 8.517 km^{2}. Towards the east the municipality extends to the forested Hymettus mountain. The built-up area of Zografou is continuous with that of municipality of Athens. A large campus of the National and Kapodistrian University of Athens is situated in Ano Ilisia, the easternmost quarter of Zografou. Ano Ilisia derived its name from the river Ilisos, which starts at St Eleousa, now in the University campus. Another quarter of Zografou is Goudi, in the northwestern part of the municipality. The main church of Zografou is consecrated to Agios Therapontas (Greek: Άγιος Θεράποντας). With Zografou having been built on the hills of Hymettus, a common sight around the suburb are some very steep uphill streets.

=== Climate ===
Zografou has a hot-summer Mediterranean climate (Csa in the Köppen climate classification). It has hot dry summers and relatively mild winters.

Climate data for Zografou 219 m a.s.l. (1993-2025)
Month	Jan	Feb	Mar	Apr	May	Jun	Jul	Aug	Sep	Oct	Nov	Dec	Year
Record high °C (°F)	22.6 (72.7)	22.0 (71.6)	30.3 (86.5)	29.9 (85.8)	38.4 (101.1)	42.6 (108.7)	42.5 (108.5)	43.4 (110.1)	38.3 (100.9)	32.9 (91.2)	27.1 (80.8)	23.6 (74.5)	43.4 (110.1)
Mean daily maximum °C (°F)	12.4 (54.3)	13.0 (55.4)	15.5 (59.9)	19.4 (66.9)	25.0 (77.0)	29.9 (85.8)	32.6 (90.7)	32.2 (90.0)	27.8 (82.0)	22.6 (72.7)	18.0 (64.4)	13.9 (57.0)	21.9 (71.3)
Daily mean °C (°F)	9.4 (48.9)	9.7 (49.5)	11.7 (53.1)	15.1 (59.2)	20.3 (68.5)	25.1 (77.2)	28.0 (82.4)	27.8 (82.0)	23.5 (74.3)	18.9 (66.0)	14.7 (58.5)	11.0 (51.8)	17.9 (64.3)
Mean daily minimum °C (°F)	6.3 (43.3)	6.3 (43.3)	7.9 (46.2)	10.8 (51.4)	15.5 (59.9)	20.3 (68.5)	23.4 (74.1)	23.3 (73.9)	19.2 (66.6)	15.1 (59.2)	11.4 (52.5)	8.1 (46.6)	14.0 (57.1)
Record low °C (°F)	−4.3 (24.3)	−7.1 (19.2)	−2.3 (27.9)	2.4 (36.3)	8.7 (47.7)	11.4 (52.5)	16.8 (62.2)	17.0 (62.6)	11.9 (53.4)	6.2 (43.2)	−0.3 (31.5)	−1.9 (28.6)	−7.1 (19.2)
Average rainfall mm (inches)	70.2 (2.76)	47.1 (1.85)	49.1 (1.93)	24.8 (0.98)	25.3 (1.00)	16.0 (0.63)	12.2 (0.48)	8.5 (0.33)	25.3 (1.00)	43.7 (1.72)	80.0 (3.15)	85.8 (3.38)	488 (19.21)
Source: National Technical University of Athens (Oct 1993- May 2025).

== Transport ==
Zografou is served by bus lines 140 (Polygono - Glyfada), 220 (Ano Ilisia - Akadimia), 221 (Panepistimioupoli - Akadimia), 230 (Akropoli - Zografou), 235 (Zografou - Akadimia), 250 (Panepistimioupoli - Evangelismos station), 608 (Galatsi - Akadimia - Nekr. Zografou), 622 (Goudi - Ano Galatsi) and 815 (Goudi - Tavros). The A62 Hymettus Ring Road (formerly the A64 until 2024) passes through the municipality.

At summer of 2029, Zografou will have 3 metro stations at Ilissia, Zografou (Gardenia Place) and Goudi.

== History ==
After the departure of the Ottomans from the area in the 1830s, the area came into the ownership of Ioannis Koniaris, mayor of Athens from 1851 to 1854, and Leonidas Vournazos.

In 1902, Eleni Vournazos, widow of Leonidas, sold 1,250 stremmata (1 stremma equal to 1000 square meters ) of the Kouponia/Goudi area to Ioannis Zografos (died 1927), a Member of Parliament for the Nationalist Party and university professor. Dividing it into plots, he sold them for installments of 112 drachma per month. The first houses were erected in 1919. Within ten years, 100 had been built. At this time, the foundations of the Church of St. Therapon were erected.

In 1929, the area, now known as Zografou, was split from the municipality of Athens and became an independent community. It was elevated to a municipality in 1947, its first president being Sotirios Zografos, the son of Ioannis. In 1935, the area of Kouponia (now Ano Ilisia) was incorporated into the community.

== Scientific Centers, Museums and others ==
- Dimitri Kitsikis Public Foundation"
- Gounaropoulos Museum, dedicated to the works of painter Giorgios Gounaropoulos. It was founded in 1979.
- Marika Kotopouli Museum, a museum of modern art, founded in 1990 and housed in the 1926 villa of actress Marika Kotopouli

== Sports ==
Zografou hosts the local sport teams Asteras Zografou, a football club founded in 1965 and EFAO Zografou B.C. (formerly Filathlitikos B.C.), a basketball club founded in 1986. In addition, the sport club Ilisiakos AO, founded in 1927, is based in Ilisia a district that is shared between Municipalities of Athens and Zografou.

Sport clubs based in Zografou
Club	Founded	Sports	Achievements
Ilisiakos F.C.	1927	Football	Earlier presence in Beta Ethniki
Asteras Zografou	1965	Football	Earlier presence in Beta Ethniki
EFAO Zografou	1986	Basketball	Earlier presence in Greek A2 League basketball

== Historical population ==
Historical population
Year	Pop.	±%
1981	84,548	—
1991	80,490	−4.8%
2001	76,115	−5.4%
2011	71,026	−6.7%
2021	69,874	−1.6%

== Notable people ==
- Dimitri Kitsikis (1935–2021) Royal Society of Canada
- Marika Kotopouli (1887–1954) actress
- Nikos Kourkoulos (1934–2007) actor
- Luciano de Souza (1972-) football player

== Gallery ==
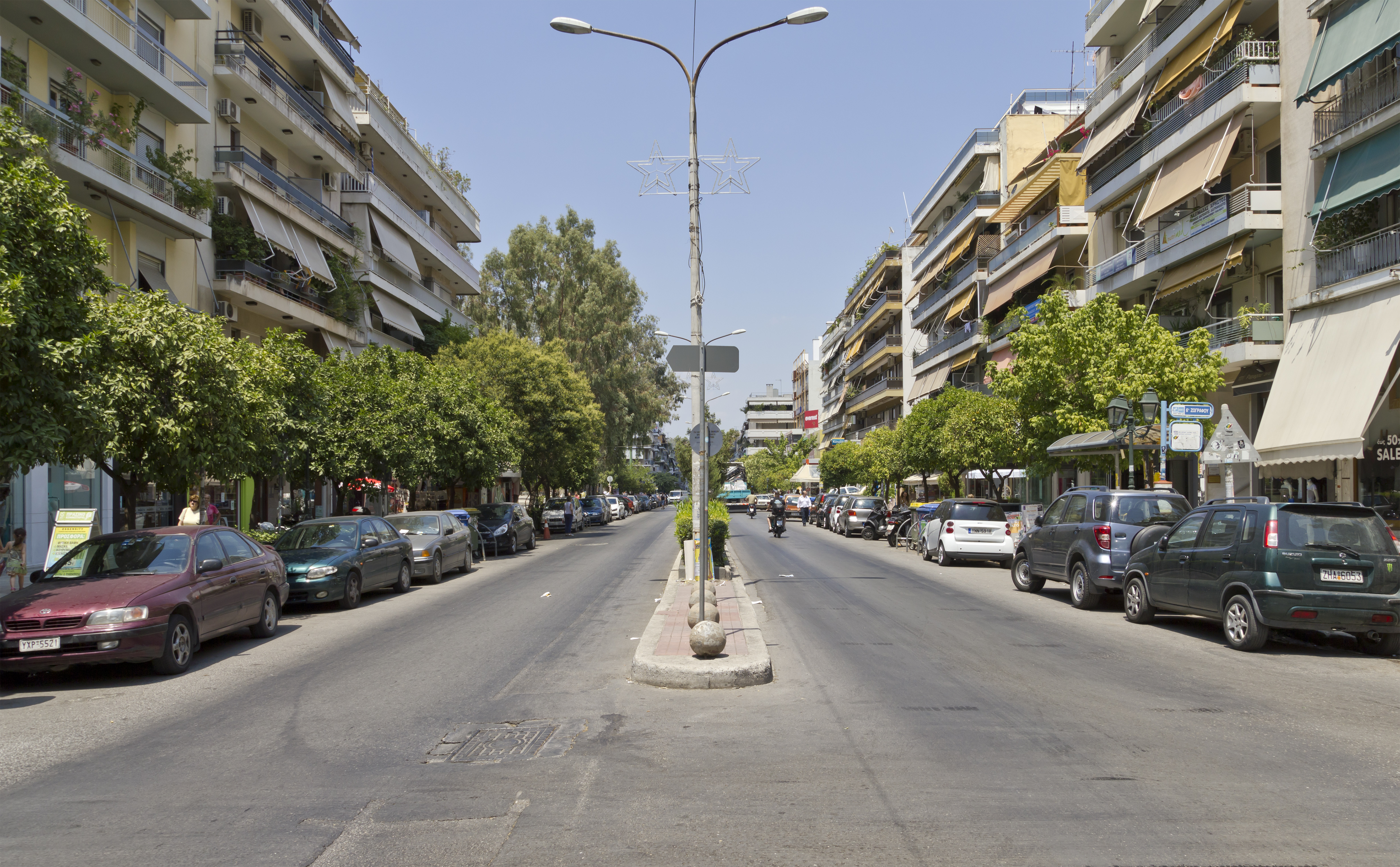
Papagou Avenue in Zografou

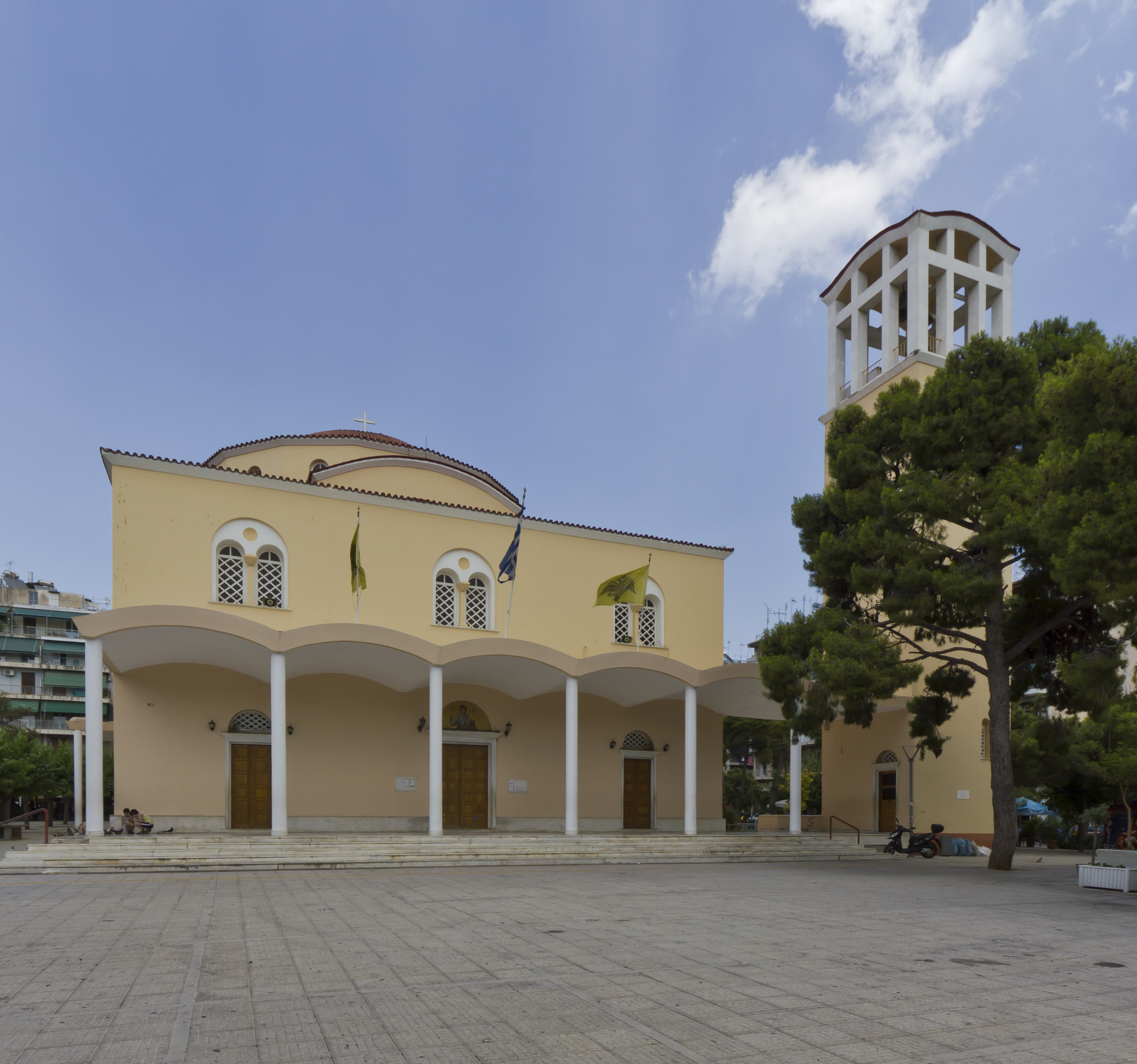
Church of St. Thomas

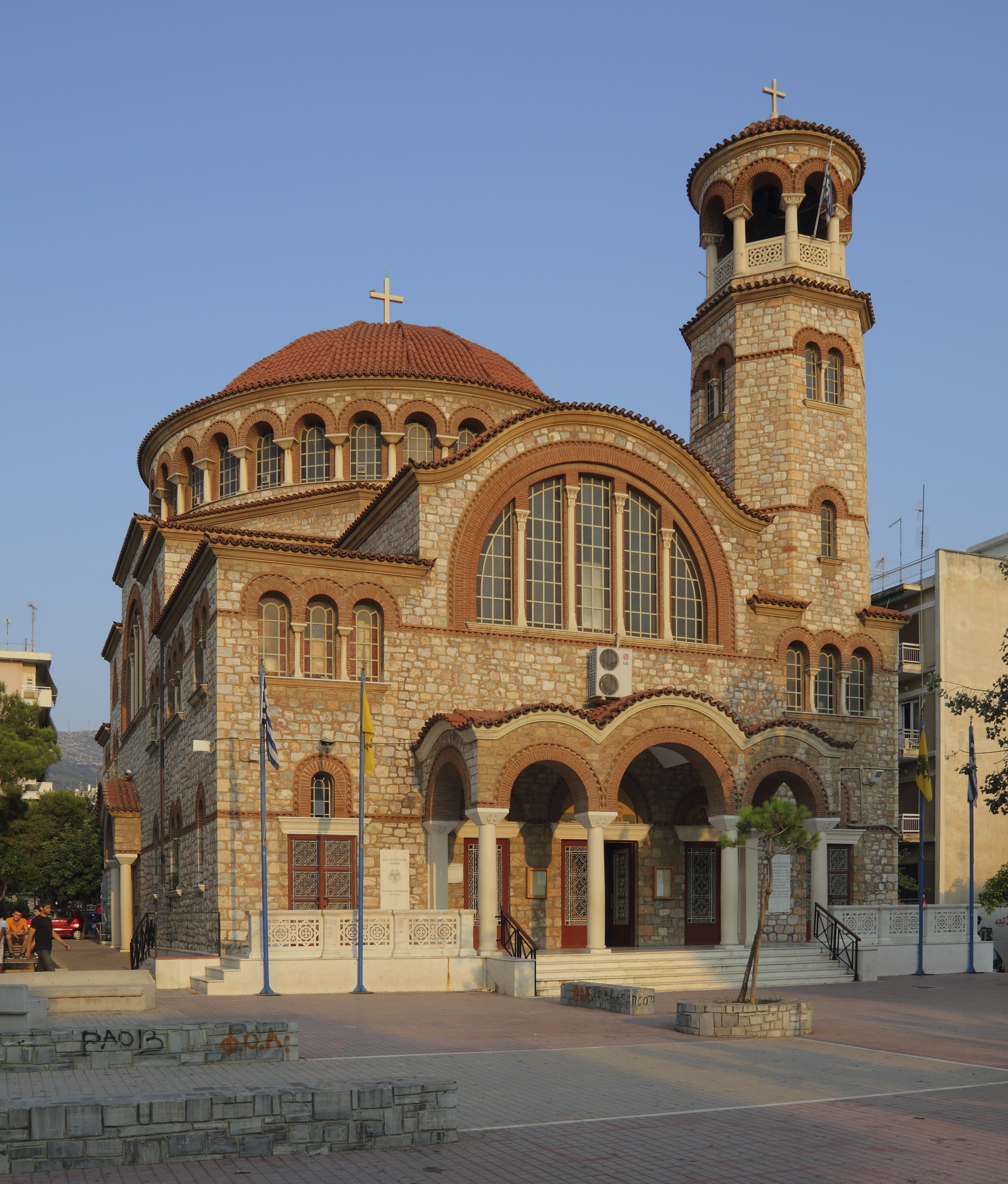
Church of St. Therapon

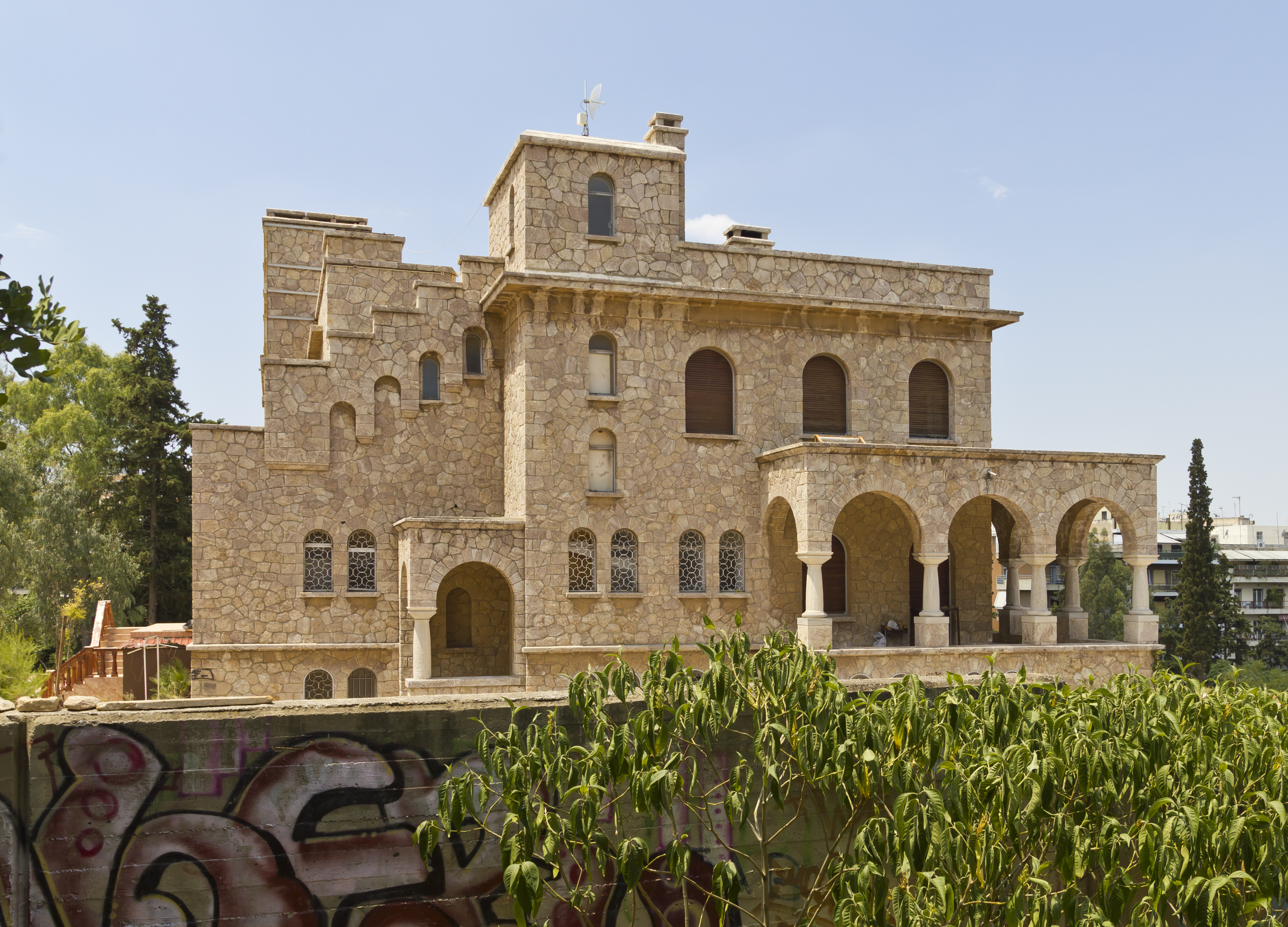
Villa Zografou

== See also ==
- List of municipalities of Attica
