= Ilisia, Athens =

Ilisia Ιλίσια
- Neighborhood
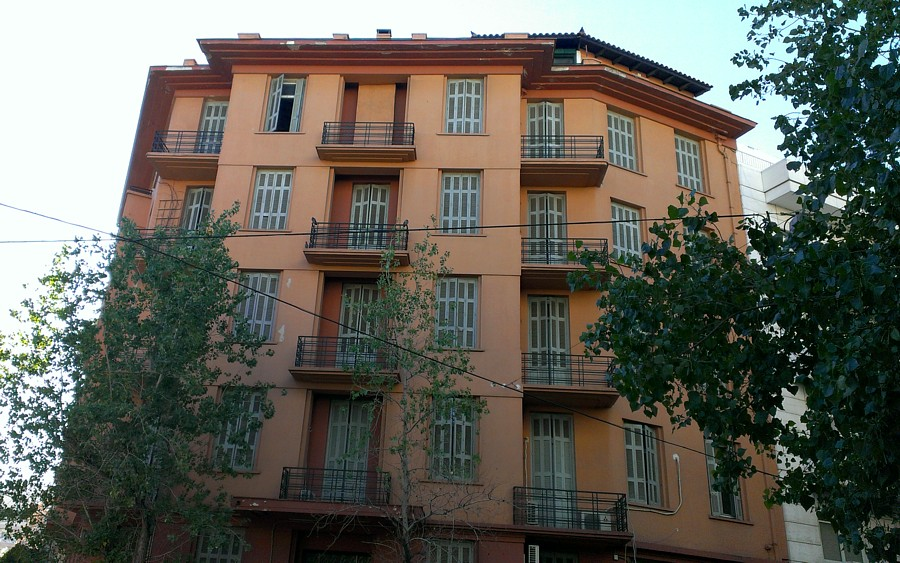
- A building of Ilisia

- Location within Athens
- Coordinates: 37°58′37″N 23°45′25″E
- Country: Greece
- Region: Attica
- City: Athens
- Postal code: 115 28, 161 21
- Area code: 210
- Website: www.cityofathens.gr

Ilisia (Greek: Ιλίσια, pronounced [iˈli.si.a]) is a neighborhood of Athens, Greece, named after the river Ilisos. A portion of the neighborhood, Ano Ilisia (Upper Ilisia), is in Zografou and is near the Theology, Philosophy and Scientific faculties of the University of Athens. The lower (western) part is also known as the "Hilton" neighborhood due to the proximity of the Hilton Athens hotel.

Ilisia is named after the Ilisos river, which rises near Kaisariani on the slopes of Mount Hymettus and which, although Athens' historic river, is barely noticeable except in heavy rain. The name originally used for the villa of Sophie de Marbois-Lebrun, Duchess of Plaisance (Villa Ilisia), that was built near Ilisos river in 1848. Today this building hosts the Byzantine Museum.

== Sports ==
The sport club of Ilisia is Ilisiakos AO, founded in 1927, with football team (Ilisiakos F.C.) and basketball team Ilisiakos B.C.. Although the name Ilisiakos seems to mean "team of Ilisia", the spelling, with Greek letter H (Ηλυσιακός) instead of I (Ιλισιακός), refers to Elysium (Ἠλύσιον πεδίον). The rationale for this is that the club aims to represent a wider area from Ilisia.

== Notable people ==
- Nikko Patrelakis, musician

== See also ==
- Byzantine & Christian Museum
