= Gounaropoulos Museum =

Art museum in Athens, Greece

Coordinates: 37°58′30″N 23°45′41.5″E

- Established: 1979
- Location: Athens, Greece
- Owner: Zografou

Gounaropoulos Museum is located in Athens, Greece. Founded in 1979, it belongs to the municipality of Zografou and aims to present and promote the work of the painter Giorgos Gounaropoulos. The museum is housed in the artist's home and atelier, and contains 40 oil paintings and drawings, the artist's personal belongings and archive. Guided tours and educational programs are offered, and a variety of art exhibitions, lectures and other cultural events are hosted.
