= A62 motorway (Greece) =

Road in Greece

A62 motorway
- Αυτοκινητόδρομος Α62
- Route of the A62 motorway, in green, and the Alimos–Katechaki Link Road, in blue

Route information
- Length: 10 km (6.2 mi)

Major junctions
- West end: Katechaki Avenue
- East end: Pikermi

Location
- Country: Greece
- Regions: Attica
- Primary destinations: Katechaki Avenue; Cholargos; Gerakas (Stavros); Leontari; Pikermi

Highway system
- Highways in Greece; Motorways; National roads
| ← A6 | → A621 |

The A62 motorway, also known as the Hymettus Ring Road (Greek: Περιφερειακός Υμηττού), and formerly signed as the A64 motorway until 2024, is a branch of the A6 motorway in the Attiki Odos motorway network. It is named after the Hymettus mountain range, which it partly encircles.

The motorway serves parts of eastern Athens, and planning is underway to extend it to the southern suburbs with a tunnel following Mount Hymettus to Elliniko, and it would end at Vouliagmenis Avenue. Another extension from the north-east end will extend further eastwards to the port of Rafina.

== Route ==
The A62 motorway is an east–west motorway that forms part of the Attiki Odos toll motorway network, with the western half forming part of the outer ring road around Athens: the motorway currently runs between Papagou in the west and Pikermi in the east, connecting with the A6 and A621 motorways, as well as the EO89 and the Alimos–Katechaki Link Road.

=== Exit list ===
| Regional unit | km | mi | Exit | Name | Destinations | Notes |
|---|---|---|---|---|---|---|
| Central Athens | 0.00 | 0.00 | Υ1 | Katechaki | EO – Alimou–Karea Avenue, Kaisariani Athens–Center, Katechaki Avenue | |
| Central Athens | 0.43 | 0.27 | Katechaki Toll Station (eastbound only) | | | |
| Central Athens | | | Papagou Tunnel (120 m eastbound, 96 m westbound) | | | |
| North Athens | 2.00 | 1.24 | Υ2 | Papagou | Papagou, Anastaseos Street | Toll station on entry |
| North Athens | | | Cholargos Tunnel (195 m eastbound, 103 m westbound) | | | |
| North Athens | | | Demokritos South Tunnel (345 m eastbound, 35+50 m westbound) | | | |
| North Athens | | | Demokritos Tunnel (290 m eastbound, 275 m westbound) | | | |
| North Athens | | | Demokritos North Tunnel (370 m eastbound, 400 m westbound) | | | |
| North Athens | 4.60 | 2.86 | Υ3 | Dimokritos | Cholargos, Agia Paraskevi | Eastbound entry and westbound exit only Toll station on eastbound entry |
| North Athens | | | College Tunnel (640 m eastbound, 560 m westbound) | | | |
| North Athens | 5.24 | 3.26 | Υ4 | Agia Paraskevi | Agia Paraskevi | Toll station on westbound entry |
| North Athens | 5.30 | 3.29 | Υ4 | Agia Paraskevi | A621 – Elefsina | Eastbound exit and westbound entry only, to and from Elefsina |
| North Athens | | | Υ4 | Agia Paraskevi | Agia Paraskevi Tunnel (280 m eastbound, 100 m westbound) | |
| North Athens | | | Υ4 | Agia Paraskevi | Unnamed tunnel (95 m) | |
| East Attica | 6.40 | 3.98 | Υ4 | Agia Paraskevi | Agia Paraskevi, Gravias Street | Toll station on eastbound entry |
| East Attica | | | Hymettus East Tunnel (152 m eastbound, 92 m westbound) | | | |
| East Attica | 8.05 | 5.00 | Υ6 | Glyka Nera | EO89 – Lavriou Avenue, Glyka Nera | Toll station on entry |
| East Attica | 9.83 | 6.11 | Υ7Μ | Leontario | A6 / E94 – Markopoulo | Eastbound exit and westbound entry only, to and from Markopoulo |
| East Attica | 10.47 | 6.51 | Υ7Ε | Leontario | A6 / E94 – Elefsina | Westbound exit and eastbound entry only, to and from Elefsina |
| East Attica | 11.36 | 7.06 | Pallini South Toll Station (westbound only) | | | |
| East Attica | 11.70 | 7.27 | Υ8 | Pallini | Pallini, Marathonos Avenue (EO83) | |
| East Attica | 14.15 | 8.79 | Υ9 | Agios Gerasimos | Marathon, Rafina Spata, Artemida | Position estimated |
1.000 mi = 1.609 km; 1.000 km = 0.621 mi: Incomplete access; Tolled

== History ==
The Hymettus Ring Road was first defined by Ministerial Decision DMEO/e/O/1308 of 15 December 1995, as a national road between Vari and Rafina, via Gerakas (Stavros).

On 4 December 2015, the Greek government proposed to renumber the A64 as the A62: In practice, the renumbering had not taken place until 2024, because road signs still used to show the motorway as the A64. By July 2024, the renumbering was implemented due to road sign replacement.

=== Unrealised plans ===
Ministerial Decision DOY/oik/5776 of 4 December 2015 stated plans to extend the A62 motorway eastwards from Pallini to Rafina. There were also plans to extend the A62 southwards from Katechaki Avenue towards Vari.

== Alimos–Katechaki Link Road ==
The Alimos–Katechaki Link Road (Greek: Λεωφόρος Αλίμου - Κατεχάκη) is a 10.2-kilometre (6.3-mile) road that connects the A62 motorway with the EO54 road and Vouliagmenis Avenue. The southern part (between the A62 and Vouliagmenis Avenue) is a national road, subclassified as part of the secondary national network, and is at present mostly dual carriageway with level intersections, passing through Argyroupoli and Ilioupoli.
