= Mount Aigaleo =

Mountain in Greece

Aigaleo
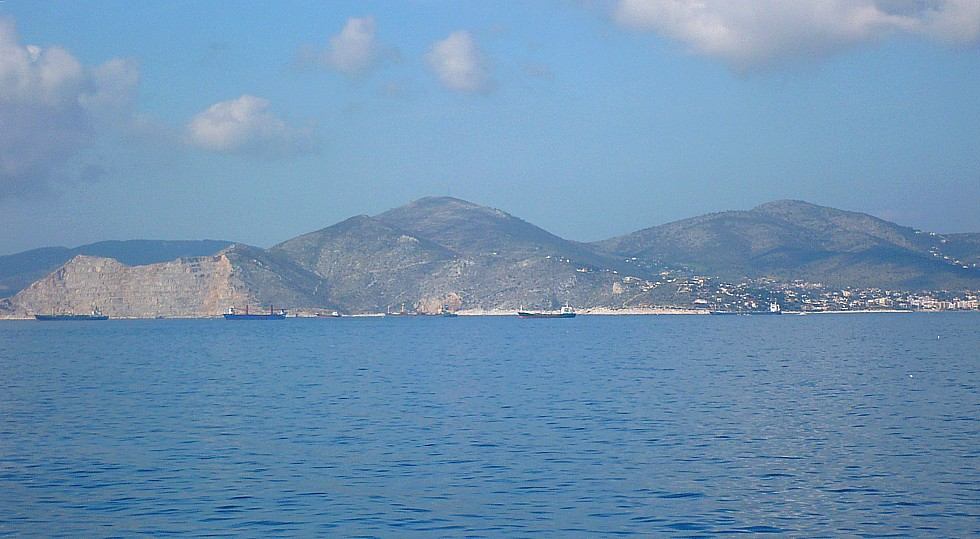
- Aigaleo seen from Salamis Island

Highest point
- Elevation: 469 m (1,539 ft)
- Coordinates: 38°02′N 23°39′E

Geography
- Location: western Attica
- Parent range: approx. 20 km, north to south approx. from 3 to 5 km from east to west

Climbing
- Easiest route: climb

Aigaleo or Egaleo (Greek: Αιγάλεω), and known in antiquity as Poikilon Oros (Ποικίλον Όρος), is a mountain next to the Athens urban area, in Attica, Greece. It lies west of the Athens plain, southeast of Eleusis, and east of the island of Salamis. Most of the mountain is rocky (limestone). It is lower than Hymettus. Most of the forest is to its north where the Daphni Monastery is located. There is also a park in its northern reaches.

With its good view of the Straits of Salamis, Mount Egaleo was the site of Xerxes' throne from which he observed the Battle of Salamis.

Towns and places that surround the mountain include Perama, Drapetsona, Nikaia, Korydallos, the highway, and Chaidari. The Athens Metro connects the area after reducing Iera Odos (Sacred Way) into two lanes in 2002–2003.

The Piraeus–Skaramagas National Road, which links Piraeus with the EO8 at Skaramagas, runs through the west of the mountain range. The refineries of Skaramagas are in the north. The new bypass on the northwestern part of the range is part of the Attiki Odos superhighway system, the A65 Aigaleo Ring Road which was opened in January 2004 along with the rest of the superhighway northwest of the range. The ring presently does not have full access with Athinon Avenue and the EO8 yet, but includes two interchanges.
