= Attica (region) =

Administrative region of Greece

Attica Περιφέρεια Αττικής
- Administrative region
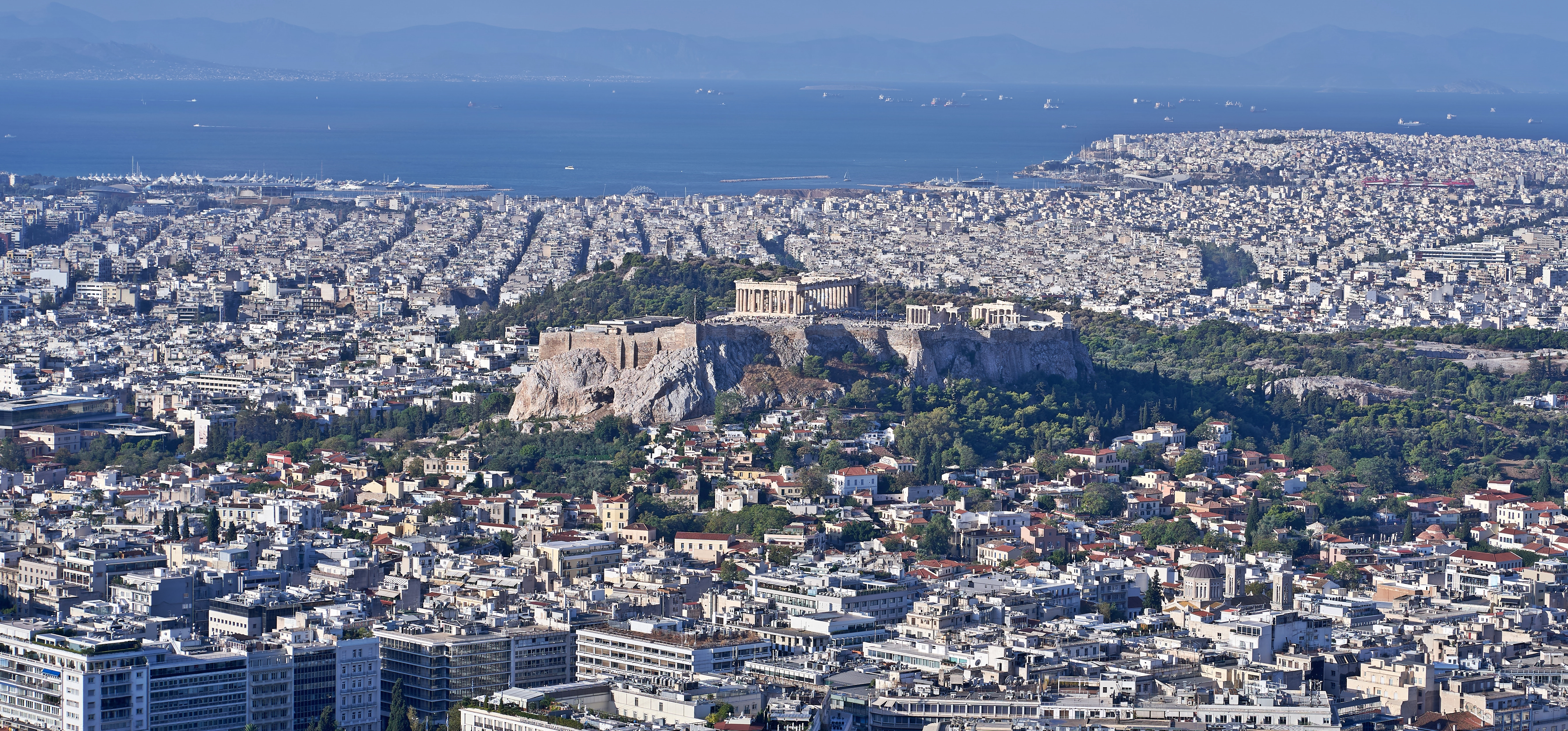
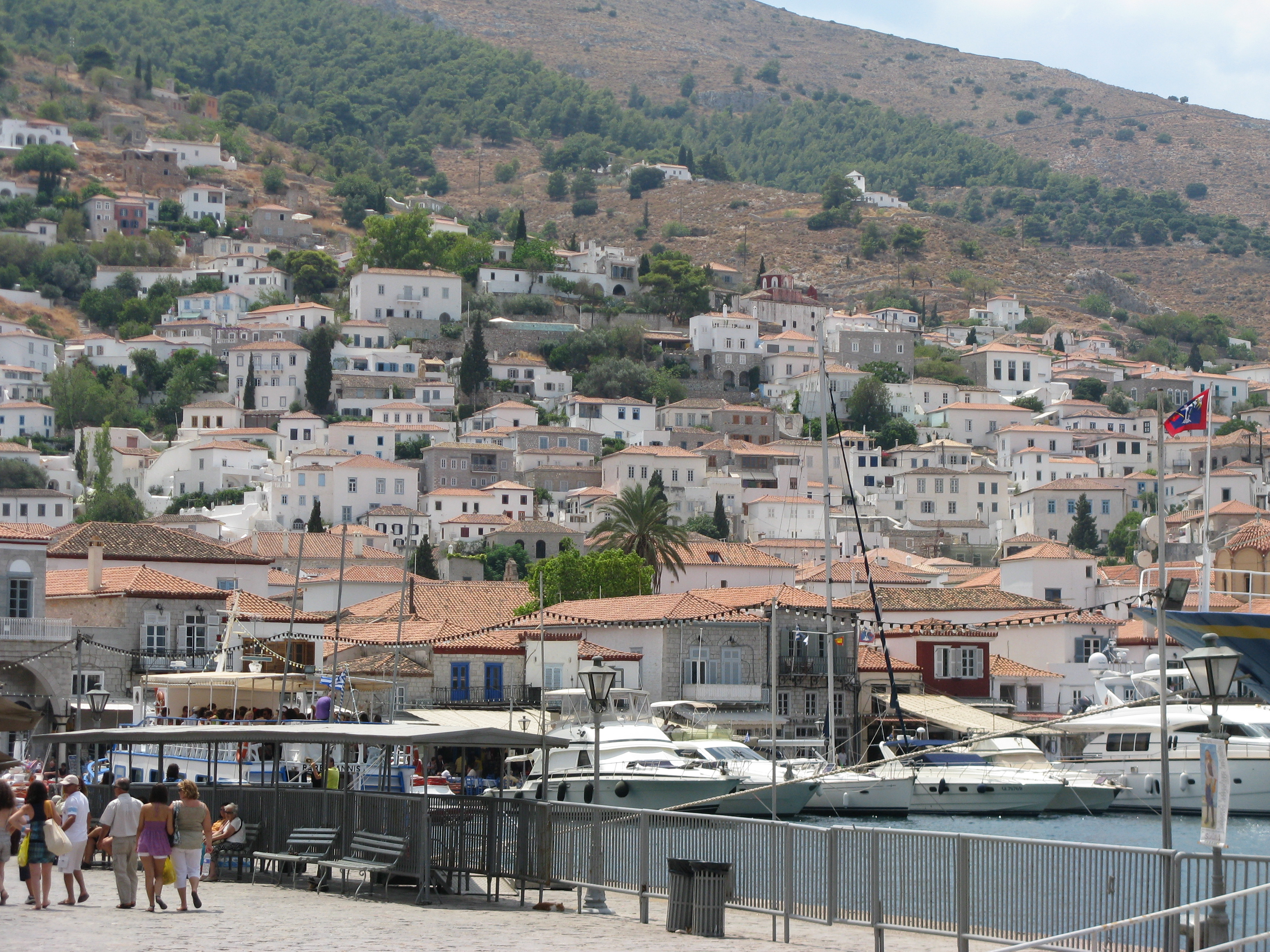
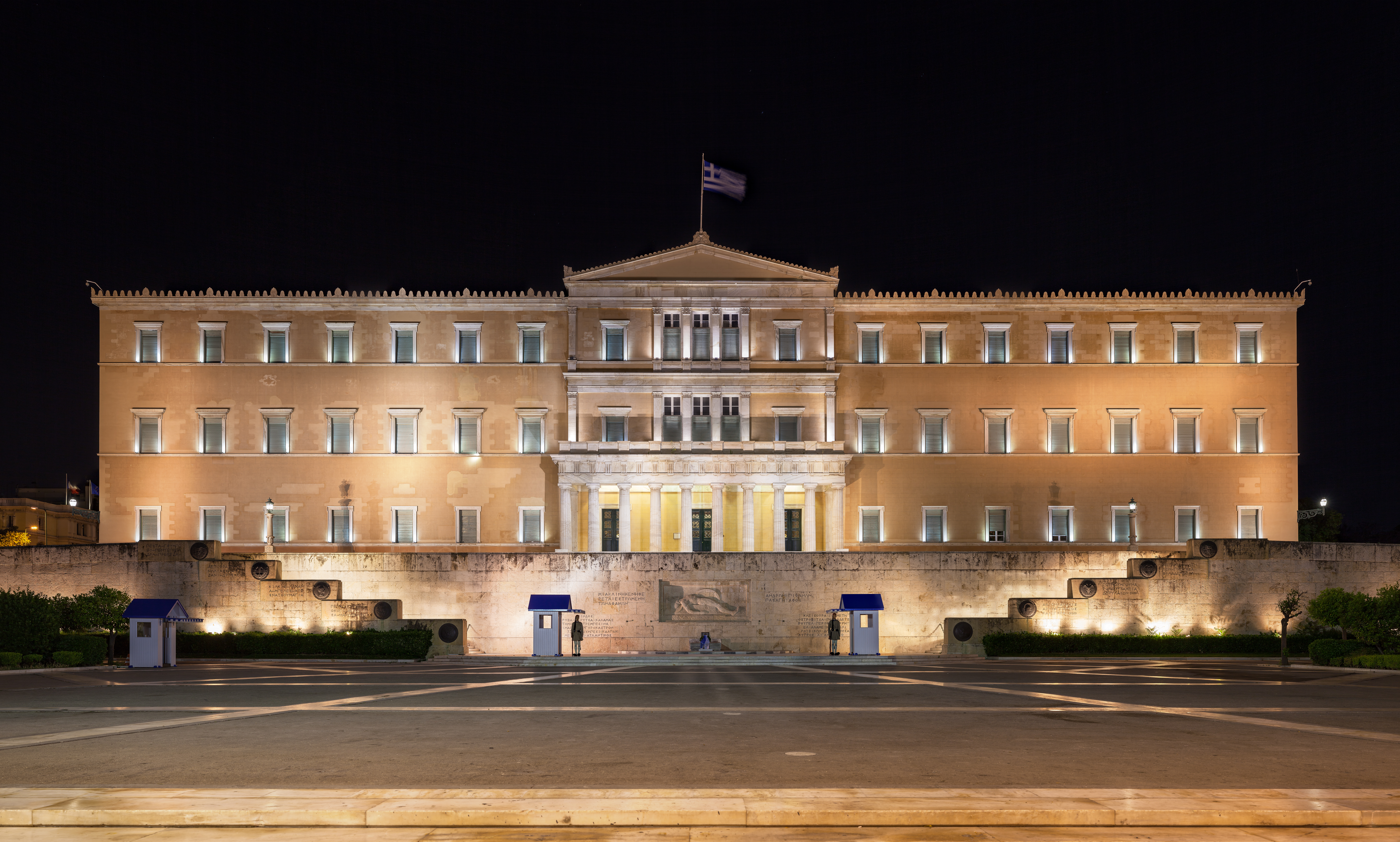
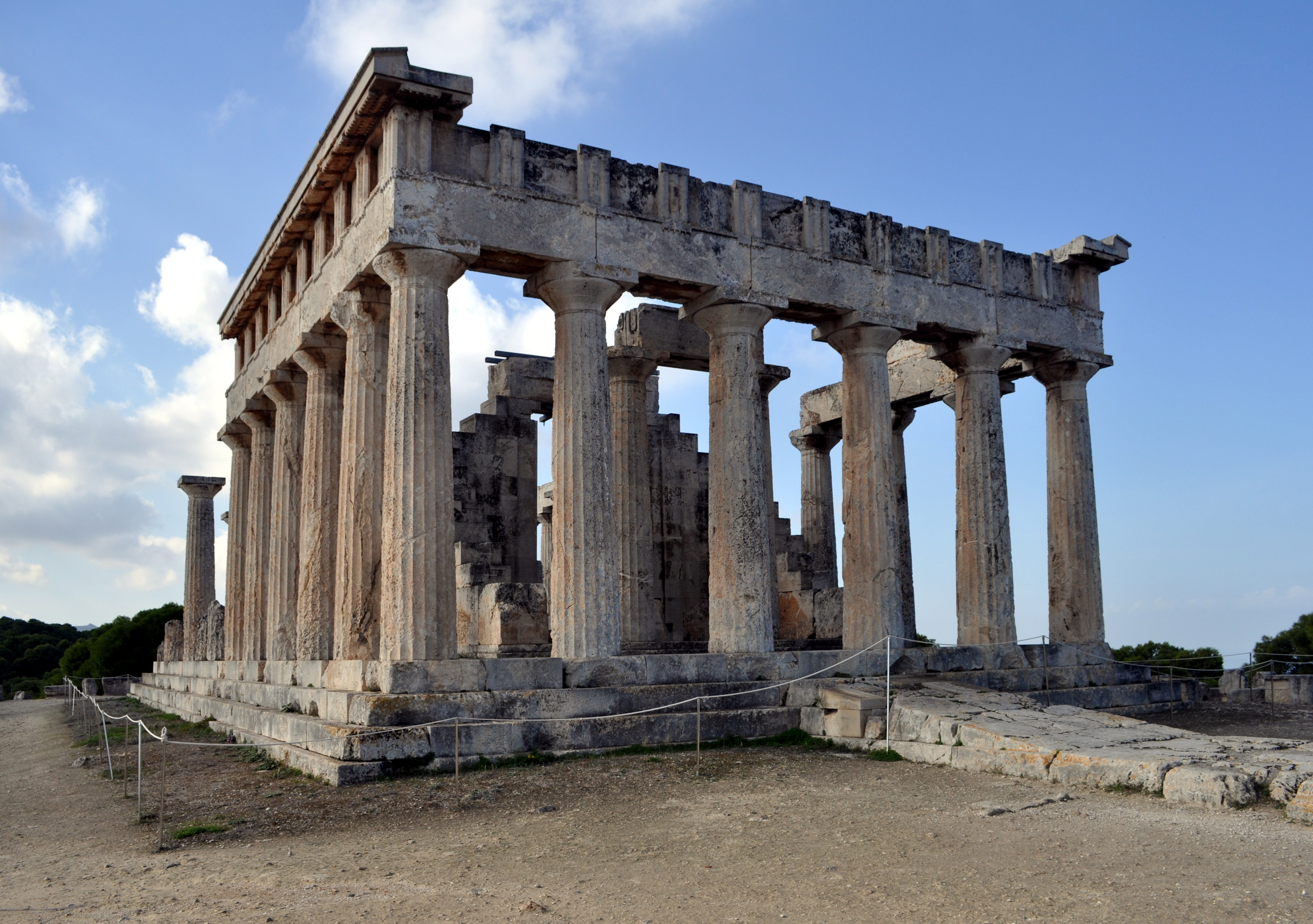
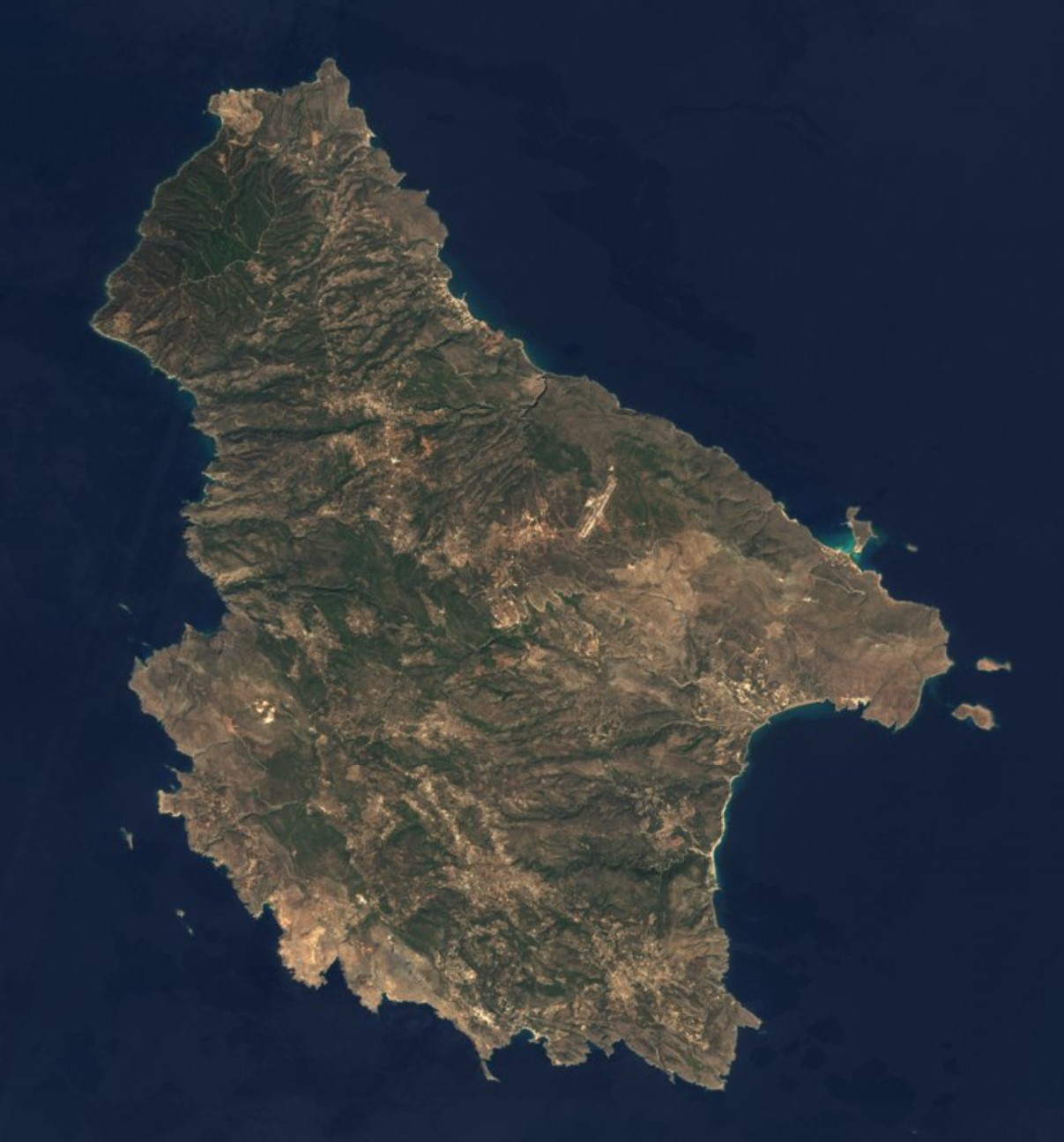
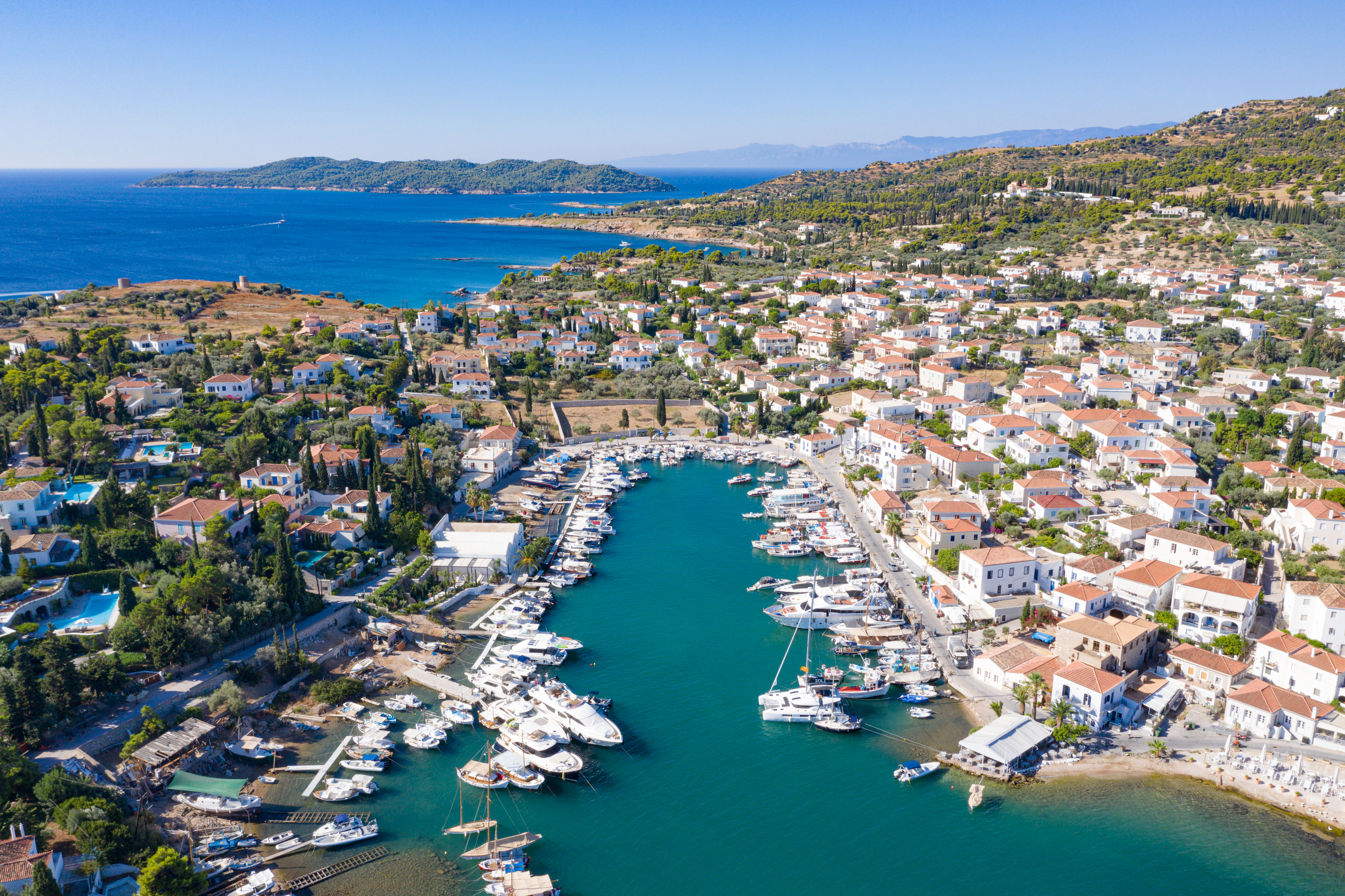
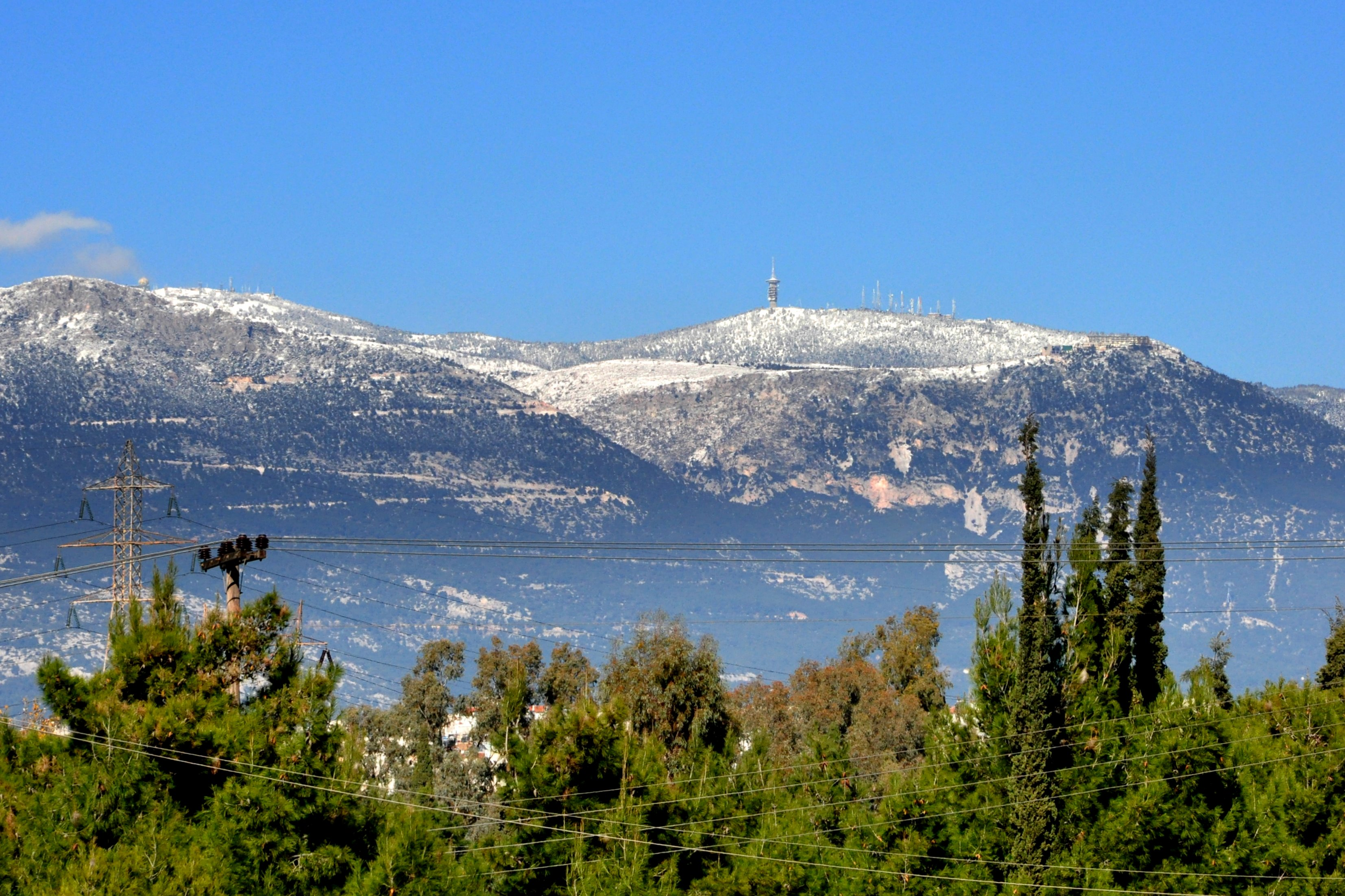
- Acropolis of Athens from Mount Lycabettus Hydra Old Royal Palace (The Hellenic Parliament) Temple of Aphaia Kythira Spetses Parnitha

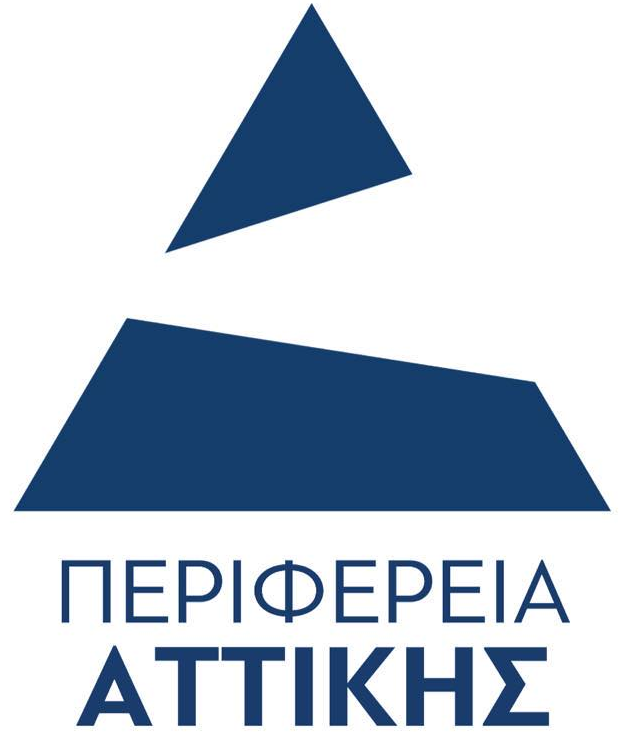
- Seal

- Coordinates: 38.0°N 23.7°E
- Country: Greece
- Decentralized Administration: Attica
- Capital: Athens
- Regional units: List: Central Athens; North Athens; West Athens; South Athens; Piraeus; East Attica; West Attica; Islands

Government
  - Type: Regional council
  - Governor: Nikos Hardalias (New Democracy)

Area
  - Total: 3,808.1 km^{2} (1,470.3 sq mi)

Population (2024)
  - Total: 3,784,565
  - Density: 993.82/km^{2} (2,574.0/sq mi)

GDP
  - Total: €115.495 billion (2024)
  - Per capita: €30,684 (2024)
- Time zone: UTC+2 (EET)
  - Summer (DST): UTC+3 (EEST)
- ISO 3166 code: GR-I
- NUTS code: EL3
- HDI (2023): 0.933 very high · 1st of 13
- Website: www.patt.gov.gr

Attica (/ˈætɪkə/ AT-ih-kə; Greek: Περιφέρεια Αττικής, romanized: Periféria Attikís, [periˈferi.a atiˈcis]) is an administrative region of Greece that encompasses the entire Athens metropolitan area, the core city of which is the country's capital and largest city, Athens. The region is coextensive with the former Attica Prefecture of Central Greece and covers a greater area than the historical region of Attica.

== Overview ==
Located on the eastern edge of Central Greece, Attica covers about 3,808 square kilometres. In addition to Athens, it contains within its area the cities of Elefsina, Megara, Laurium, and Marathon, as well as a small part of the Peloponnese peninsula and the islands of Salamis, Aegina, Angistri, Poros, Hydra, Spetses, Kythira, and Antikythera. About 3,790,000 people live in the region, of whom more than 95% are inhabitants of the Athens metropolitan area. In 2019, Attica had the HDI of 0.912, the highest in Greece.

== Administration ==
Head office of the Attica region

The region was established in the 1987 administrative reform, and until 2010 it comprised the 4 prefectures of Athens, East Attica, Piraeus and West Attica.

With the 2010 Kallikratis plan, the region's powers and authority were completely redefined and extended. Since 1 January 2011, the region represents the second-level local administration. While being supervised by the Decentralized Administration of Attica, it is now an independent self-governing body with powers and a budget comparable to the former prefectures.

The region is subdivided into eight subordinate regional units:

- North Athens
- West Athens
- Central Athens
- South Athens
- West Attica
- East Attica
- Piraeus
- Islands

== Electoral districts ==
The Attica region consists of eight electoral districts: Athens A, Athens B1, Athens B2, Athens B3, Piraeus A, Piraeus B, East Attica and West Attica.

== Major communities ==
- Acharnés (Αχαρνές) or Menídi (Μενίδι)
- Agía Paraskeví (Αγία Παρασκευή)
- Ágios Dimítrios (Άγιος Δημήτριος)
- Aigáleo (Αιγάλεω)
- Alimos (Άλιμος) or Kalamaki (Καλαμάκι)
- Athína (Αθήνα) (Municipality of Athens)
- Chalándri (Χαλάνδρι)
- Galátsi (Γαλάτσι)
- Glyfáda (Γλυφάδα)
- Ílion (Ίλιον) (formerly Nea Liosia)
- Ilioúpoli (Ηλιούπολη)
- Kallithéa (Καλλιθέα)
- Keratsíni (Κερατσίνι)
- Kifissia (Κηφισιά)
- Korydallós (Κορυδαλλός)
- Maroúsi (Μαρούσι) or Amaroúsion (Αμαρούσιον)
- Néa Ionía (Νέα Ιωνία)
- Néa Smýrni (Νέα Σμύρνη)
- Níkaia (Νίκαια)
- Palaió Fáliro (Παλαιό Φάληρο)
- Peiraiás (Πειραιάς) (Piraeus in English)
- Peristéri (Περιστέρι)
- Výronas (Βύρωνας)
- Zográfos (Ζωγράφος)

See also

- List of municipalities and communities in Attica
- List of settlements in Attica

== Demographics ==
The region has shrunk by 35,965 people between 2011 and 2021, experiencing a population loss of 0.9%.

== Climate ==
Due to its large area Attica has a variety of climates. The largest part of the peninsula has a hot-summer Mediterranean climate (Köppen climate classification: Csa). Some areas of the Athens Riviera, areas of the Thriasio Plain, Aigina, Hydra and some areas in west Attica have a hot semi-arid climate (Köppen climate classification: BSh). According to the meteorological stations of the National Observatory of Athens and the Hellenic National Meteorological Service areas in the north have wetter and colder winters. Parnitha mountain has a January average high of around 4 °C and an average low below 0 °C. Areas in the south mainland have very mild winters with Nea Smyrni recording a January average high close to 15 °C and an average low of around 9 °C. The islands of the Attica region have even milder winters with Hydra recording a January average low of over 10 °C and falling in 11a hardiness zone.

The highest July and August temperatures are recorded in the interior of the Athens Basin and also in west areas with Nea Filadelfeia, Harokopio University and Salamina registering average summer highs over 35 °C. Due to land breezes, summer nights can be particularly hot in the south and especially around Piraeus which records an average August low of around 27 °C. The highest average annual temperatures are recorded in Nea Smyrni registering around 20.5 °C, while the lowest is recorded in Parnitha mountain with less than 11.0 °C. Neos Kosmos is the warmest area of Downtown Athens with an average annual temperature of 20.2 °C and a hot semi-arid climate (Köppen climate classification: BSh) closely bordering a hot-summer mediterranean (Csa) climate. During July 2024 minimum temperatures remained over 30 °C (86 °F) for 12 consecutive days in metropolitan Athens, breaking all known records for any area in the country.

Anavysos in the Athens Riviera records the lowest average annual precipitation in mainland Greece with around 295 mm, while the highest average annual precipitation is found in Avlonas with around 930 mm. Lavrio is the only area in mainland Attica that has never recorded an air frost according to the National Observatory of Athens station which operates since 2008.

The highest temperature ever recorded in Attica was 48.0 °C in Elefsina and Tatoi on July 10, 1977, which according to the World Meteorological Organization was also the highest official temperature ever recorded in Europe until 2021. The lowest temperature ever recorded was −12.0 °C in Parnitha mountain on January 9, 2017. The highest minimum temperature in mainland Attica was 32.9 °C (91 °F) and it was recorded on July 26, 2023, in Hellinikon. The highest minimum temperature in the Attica region was 37.0 °C (99 °F) in Kythira. Furthermore, Attica has experienced temperatures of 47.5 °C and over in four different locations.

Climate data for Downtown Athens (1991–2020), Extremes (1890–present)
Month	Jan	Feb	Mar	Apr	May	Jun	Jul	Aug	Sep	Oct	Nov	Dec	Year
Record high °C (°F)	22.8 (73.0)	25.3 (77.5)	28.2 (82.8)	32.2 (90.0)	37.6 (99.7)	44.8 (112.6)	42.8 (109.0)	43.9 (111.0)	38.7 (101.7)	36.5 (97.7)	30.5 (86.9)	23.1 (73.6)	44.8 (112.6)
Mean daily maximum °C (°F)	13.3 (55.9)	14.2 (57.6)	17.0 (62.6)	21.1 (70.0)	26.5 (79.7)	31.6 (88.9)	34.3 (93.7)	34.3 (93.7)	29.6 (85.3)	24.4 (75.9)	18.9 (66.0)	14.4 (57.9)	23.3 (73.9)
Daily mean °C (°F)	10.2 (50.4)	10.8 (51.4)	13.1 (55.6)	16.7 (62.1)	21.8 (71.2)	26.6 (79.9)	29.3 (84.7)	29.4 (84.9)	25.0 (77.0)	20.3 (68.5)	15.6 (60.1)	11.6 (52.9)	19.2 (66.6)
Mean daily minimum °C (°F)	7.1 (44.8)	7.3 (45.1)	9.2 (48.6)	12.3 (54.1)	17.0 (62.6)	21.6 (70.9)	24.2 (75.6)	24.4 (75.9)	20.4 (68.7)	16.2 (61.2)	12.2 (54.0)	8.7 (47.7)	15.0 (59.0)
Record low °C (°F)	−6.5 (20.3)	−5.7 (21.7)	−2.6 (27.3)	1.7 (35.1)	6.2 (43.2)	11.8 (53.2)	16 (61)	15.5 (59.9)	8.9 (48.0)	5.9 (42.6)	−1.1 (30.0)	−4.0 (24.8)	−6.5 (20.3)
Average rainfall mm (inches)	55.6 (2.19)	44.4 (1.75)	45.6 (1.80)	27.6 (1.09)	20.7 (0.81)	11.6 (0.46)	10.7 (0.42)	5.4 (0.21)	25.8 (1.02)	38.6 (1.52)	70.8 (2.79)	76.3 (3.00)	433.1 (17.06)
Average relative humidity (%)	72.0	70.0	66.0	60.0	56.0	50.0	42.0	47.0	57.0	66.0	72.0	73.0	60.9
Average ultraviolet index	2	3	5	7	9	10	10	9	6	4	2	2	6
Source 1: Cosmos, scientific magazine of the National Observatory of Athens
Source 2: Meteoclub

Climate data for Piraeus Hellenic National Meteorological Service (1981-2010)
Month	Jan	Feb	Mar	Apr	May	Jun	Jul	Aug	Sep	Oct	Nov	Dec	Year
Mean daily maximum °C (°F)	14.1 (57.4)	14.4 (57.9)	16.6 (61.9)	20.3 (68.5)	25.1 (77.2)	29.9 (85.8)	32.8 (91.0)	32.9 (91.2)	29.1 (84.4)	24.2 (75.6)	18.9 (66.0)	15.4 (59.7)	22.81 (73.06)
Daily mean °C (°F)	11.1 (52.0)	11.2 (52.2)	13.3 (55.9)	16.9 (62.4)	21.4 (70.5)	26.3 (79.3)	29.0 (84.2)	28.8 (83.8)	25.2 (77.4)	20.6 (69.1)	15.8 (60.4)	12.6 (54.7)	19.35 (66.83)
Mean daily minimum °C (°F)	8.2 (46.8)	7.9 (46.2)	10.0 (50.0)	13.4 (56.1)	17.7 (63.9)	22.2 (72.0)	24.8 (76.6)	25.0 (77.0)	21.5 (70.7)	17.4 (63.3)	12.9 (55.2)	9.7 (49.5)	15.89 (60.60)
Average rainfall mm (inches)	41.95 (1.65)	36.26 (1.43)	34.09 (1.34)	30.34 (1.19)	15.95 (0.63)	5.08 (0.20)	5.56 (0.22)	3.07 (0.12)	11.37 (0.45)	30.5 (1.20)	58.87 (2.32)	58.84 (2.32)	331.9 (13.07)

Climate data for Attica (Record Highs)
Month	Jan	Feb	Mar	Apr	May	Jun	Jul	Aug	Sep	Oct	Nov	Dec	Year
Record high °C (°F)	25.9 (78.6)	25.9 (78.6)	30.3 (86.5)	33.4 (92.1)	40.6 (105.1)	47.5 (117.5)	48.0 (118.4)	46.2 (115.2)	41.6 (106.9)	38.4 (101.1)	32.2 (90.0)	25.8 (78.4)	48.0 (118.4)

== Economy ==
The Gross domestic product (GDP) of the region was 87.4 billion € in 2018, accounting for about 47% of the Greek economic output. GDP per capita adjusted for purchasing power was €28,000 or 93% of the EU27 average in the same year. The GDP per employee was 99% of the EU average. Attica is the region in Greece with the highest GDP per capita. Despite that, the unemployment rate stood at 21.6% in 2017.

Year	2006	2007	2008	2009	2010	2011	2012	2013	2014	2015	2016	2017
Unemployment rate (in %)	8.5	7.8	6.7	9.1	12.6	18.0	25.8	28.7	27.3	25.2	23.0	21.6

== Transportation ==
=== Roads and highways ===
The main roads and highways of Attica are:

- The A1 motorway (Athens-Thessaloniki)
- The A6 motorway (northern beltway of Athens)
- The A62 motorway (eastern beltway of Athens)
- The A621 motorway
- The A64 motorway (Athens Airport link)
- The A65 motorway (western beltway of Athens)
- The A8 motorway (Eleusis-Corinth)
- Greek National Road 1 (old road Athens-Thessaloniki)
- Greek National Road 3 (Elefsina-Lamia-Florina)
- Greek National Road 8 (old road Athens-Patras)
- Greek National Road 79
- Greek National Road 83 (Marathonos Avenue)
- Greek National Road 89
- Greek National Road 91

=== Ferry lines ===
Numerous ferry lines, both normal ferries and high speed vessels, connect the port of Piraeus, with the islands of the region.

=== Other ===
- Public transport in Athens
  - Athens Suburban Railway
  - Athens Metro
  - Athens Tram

== Sport ==
=== Football clubs ===
Premier and second division Super League 1 & Super League 2

- AEK Athens - Nea Filadelfeia (Athens)
- Apollon Smyrnis - Athens
- Atromitos - Peristeri (Athens)
- Egaleo (or Egaleo) - Egaleo (Athens)
- Ethnikos Asteras - Kesariani (Athens)
- Ethnikos Piraeus - Piraeus
- Chaidari - Haidari (Athens)
- Ilisiakos - Zografou (Athens)
- Ionikos - Nikaia (Piraeus)
- Kallithea - Kallithea (Athens)
- Olympiacos - Piraeus
- Panathinaikos - Athens
- Panionios - Nea Smyrni (Athens)
- Proodeftiki – Korydallos (Piraeus)
- Thrasyvoulos - Fyli (West Attica)

Third division Football League 2

- Acharnaikos - Acharnes (Menidi)
- Agios Dimitrios F.C. – Agios Dimitrios (Athens)
- Aias Salamina - Salamina
- Charavgiakos F.C. - Ilioupoli (Athens)
- Ilioupoli GS - Ilioupoli (Athens)
- Koropi AO – Koropi
- Vyzas Megara - Megara

Junior division/unassorted

- Aittitos - Spata
- Aris Petroupolis – Petroupoli (Athens)
- Aris Vari FC – Vari
- Artemis FC – Artemida (Loutsa)
- Aspropyrgos F.C. – Aspropyrgos
- Gyziakos - Gyzi (Athens)
- Kouvaras AC - Kouvaras
- Olympiakos Papagou - Papagou (Athens)
- Panelefsiniakos - Elefsina

=== All sports ===
- Ampelokipoi AC - Athens (in the area of Ampelokipoi), fourth division
- Ethnikos GS - Athens, fourth division
- Fokianos Athinon - Athens, fourth division

=== Mini football ===
- Mini football pitches - Online bookings
- Mini football pitches and football academies
- Mini football pitches
