= European route E94 =

Road in trans-European E-road network

E94

Major junctions
- West end: Corinth
- East end: Athens

Location
- Countries: Greece

Highway system
- International E-road network; A Class; B Class

European route E94 is an intermediate Class A European route that runs between Corinth and Athens, in Greece. Introduced in 1983, it is part of the International E-road network, a network of main roads in Europe.

== History ==
The E94 was introduced with the current E-road network, which was finalised on 15 November 1975 and implemented on 15 March 1983. It replaced part of the E92 from the old E-road network, which existed from 1950 to 1983.

== Route ==
According to the 2016 revision of the European Agreement on Main International Traffic Arteries (AGR), the E94 runs between Corinth in the west and Athens in the east, via Elefsina.

Before the new motorway projects of the 2000s, the E94 consisted of the EO8 from Athens to Elefsina, and then the EO8a to Corinth. Today, the route consists of the A6 motorway (Attiki Odos) between Elefsina and Koropi, bypassing central Athens to the north, and the A8 motorway (Olympia Odos) between Elefsina and Corinth, via Megara.

The E94 connects with (from west to east): the E65 (A7/A8) at Corinth; the E962 (EO3) at Elefsina; and the E75 (A1) at Metamorfosi.

Views of the E94

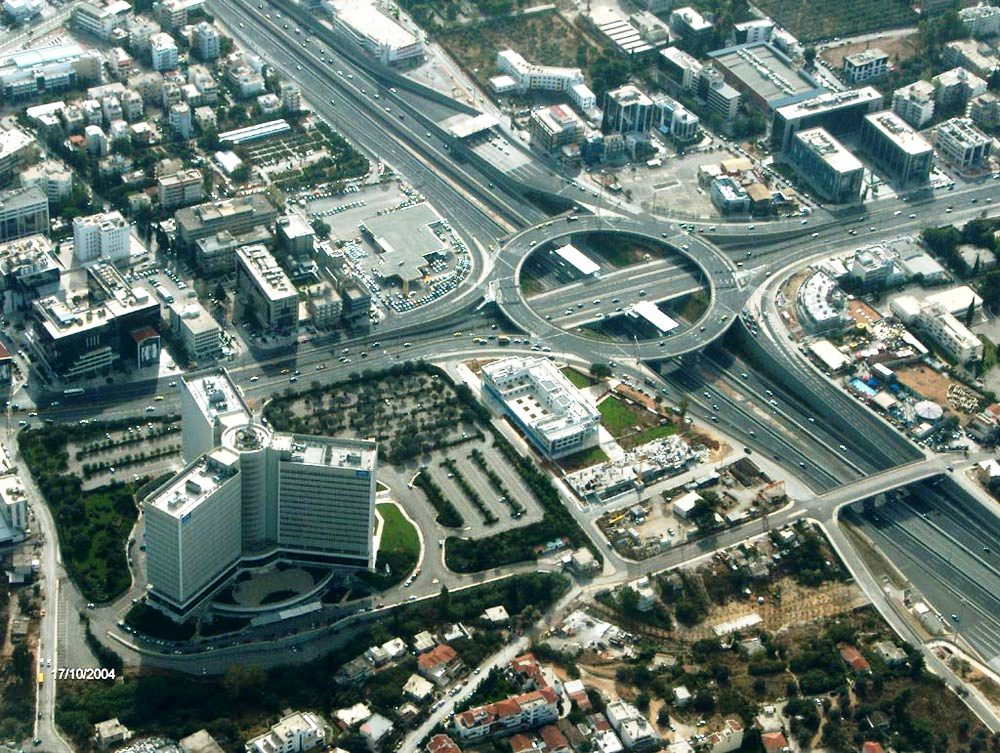
Highway interchange in the northern suburb of Marousi.

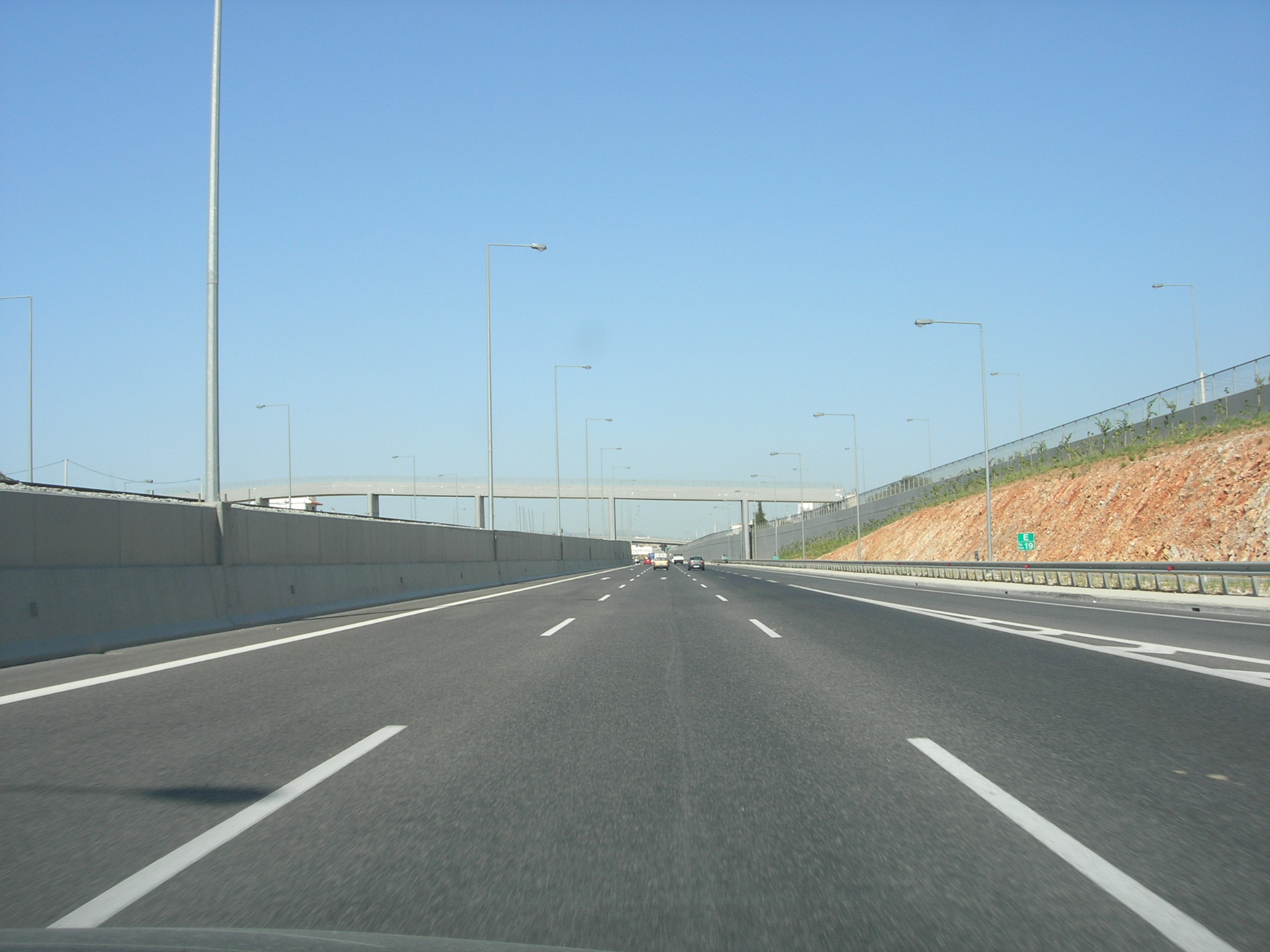
The E94 near Elefsina, Greece

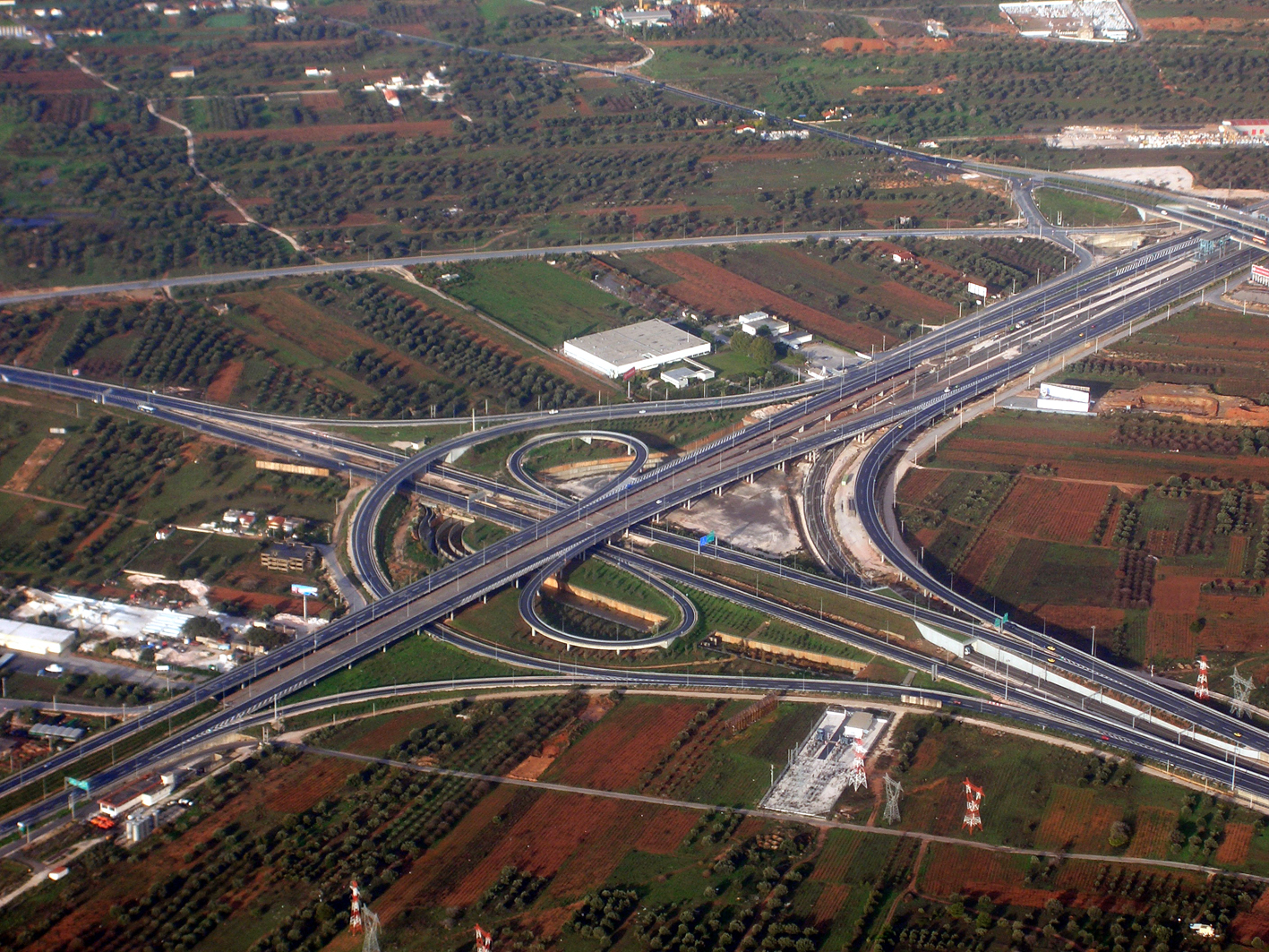
Interchange at the Attiki Odos Airport Entrance

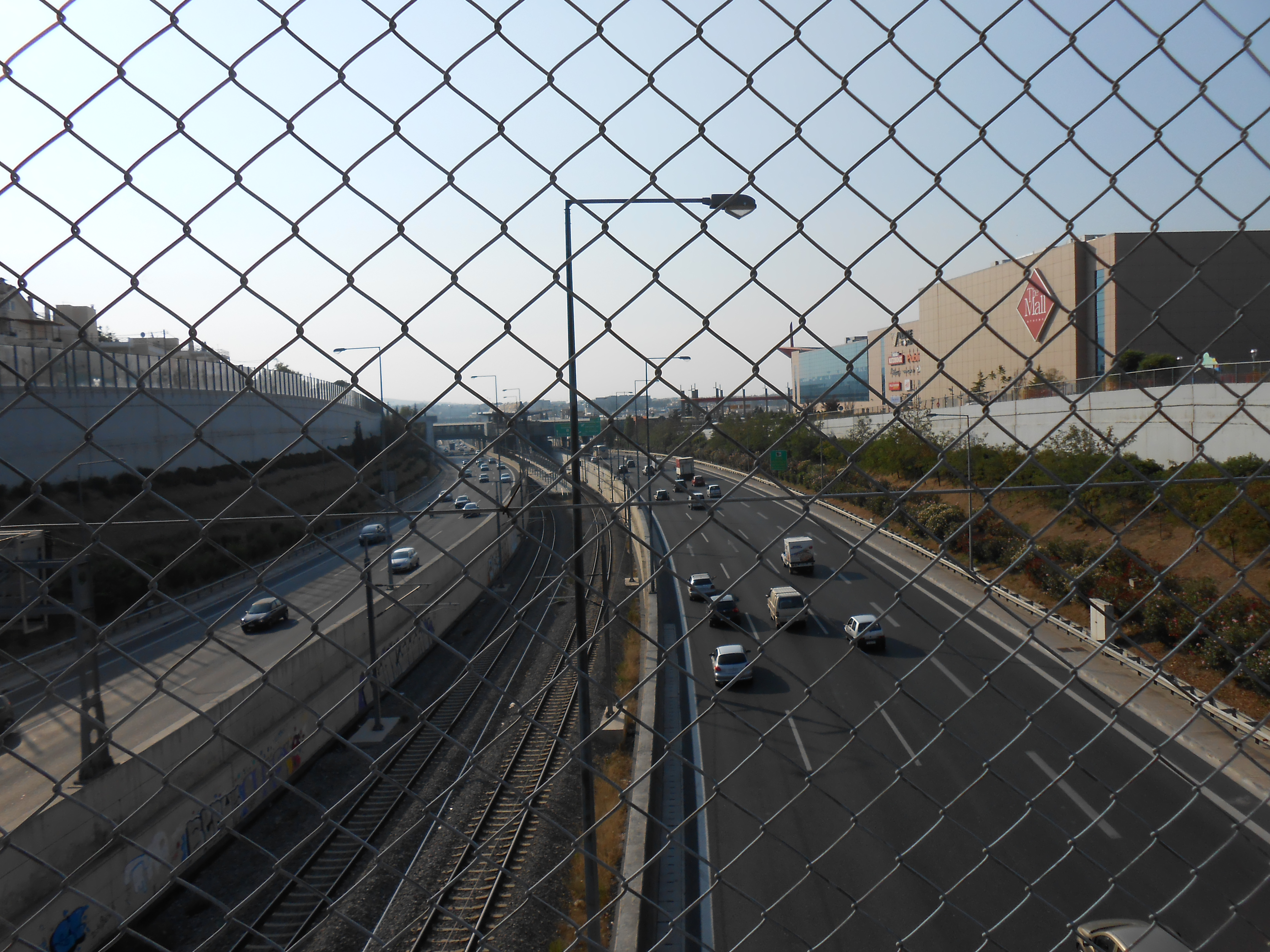
The E94 coming through Maroussi Metropolitan Suburb, outside Athens Mall, Greece

== See also ==
- International E-road network in Greece
