= Telemachus (disambiguation) =

Telemachus is a character in Homer's Odyssey.

Telemachus may also refer to:

== People ==
- Telemachus (Acragas) (fl. 554BC), leader of an uprising in Acragas, Sicily
- Saint Telemachus, monk and martyr
- Roger Telemachus, a South African cricketer
- Telemachus, a pseudonym for English rapper and DJ Forest DLG

== Books and music ==
- "Telemachus" (Ulysses episode) an episode in James Joyce's novel Ulysses
- Les Aventures de Télémaque, an historically important popular work by François Fénelon
- Telemachus, pet cat who appears on the cover of Carole King's Tapestry
- Telemachus, Friend, a short story by O. Henry which is narrated by hotel proprietor Telemachus Hicks

== See also ==
- Telémachos Alexiou, a Greek/German filmmaker
- Telemachos Kanthos (1910–1993), a Greek Cypriot artist
- Telemaco (disambiguation)
- Telemaque (disambiguation)
- Temeluchus, a tartaruchus in the non-canonical Apocalypse of Paul
- Tilemachos Karakalos (1866–1951), a Greek Olympic fencer
