= Telemaco =

Telemaco may refer to:

- Telêmaco Borba, a municipality in the state of Paraná, Brazil
- Telemaco (Scarlatti), a 1718 opera by Alessandro Scarlatti
- Telemaco (Gluck), a 1765 opera by Christoph Willibald Gluck
- Telemaco (Sor), a 1797 opera by Sor
- Telemaco (Mayr), a 1797 opera by Mayr

== People with the name ==
=== Given name ===
- Telemaco Arcangeli (1923–1998), Italian racewalker
- Telemaco Ruggeri (1876–1957), Italian actor and film director
- Telemaco Signorini (1835–1901), Italian artist
- Telémaco Susini (1856–1936), Argentinian physician

=== Surname ===
- Amaury Telemaco (1974), Dominican baseball player
- Pedro Telemaco (1968), Puerto Rican actor

== See also ==
- Telemachus (disambiguation)
- Telemaque (disambiguation)
