= List of compositions by Fernando Sor =

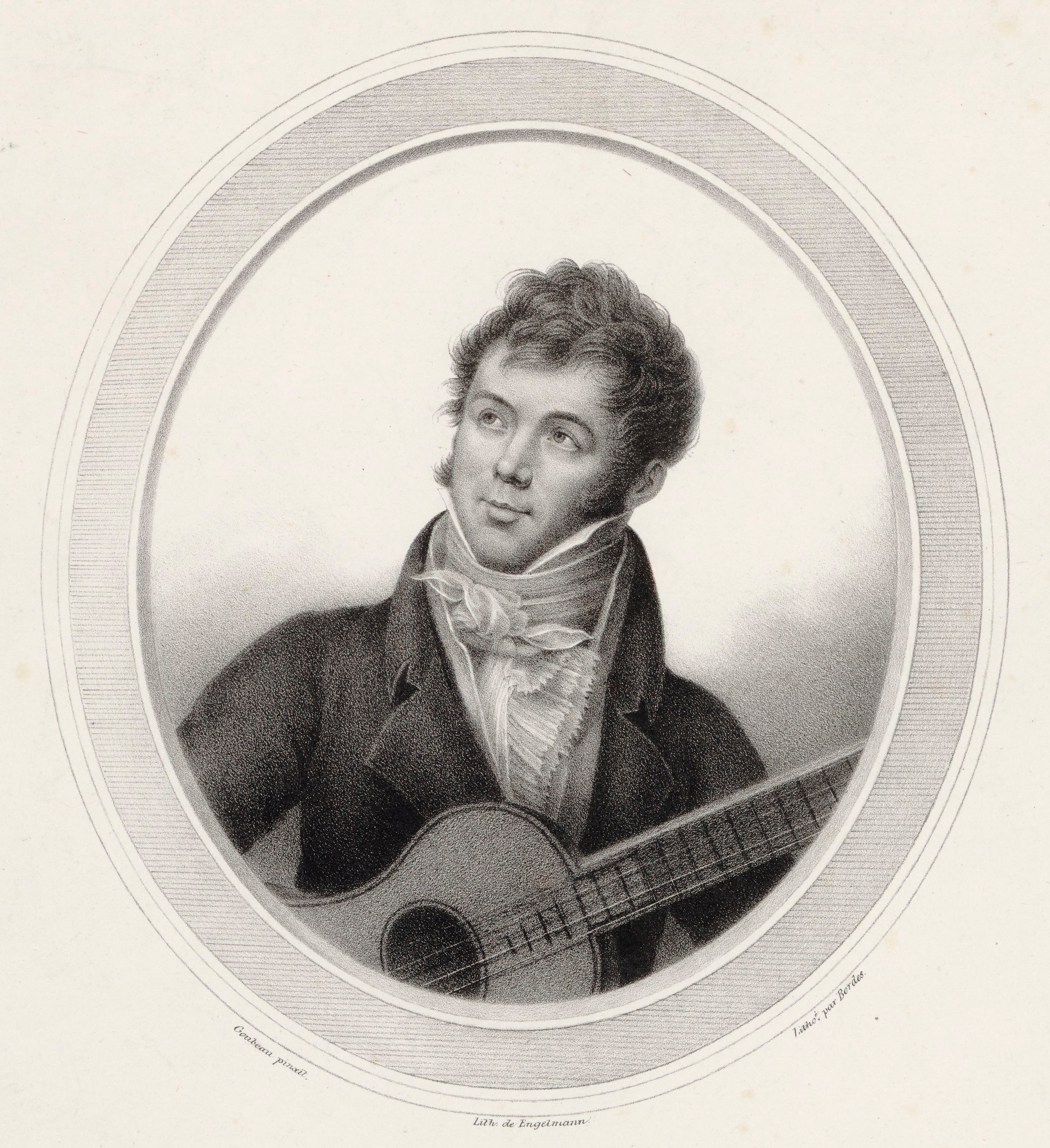
Fernando Sor

This is a list of compositions by Fernando Sor.

== Works for guitar with opus numbers ==
Opus 11 No. 2
The second piece from Twelve Minuets, Opus 11, early 19th century

Opus 31 No. 1
The first piece from Sor's 24 Progressive Lessons For Beginners, Opus 31, c.1828

Opus 35 No. 17
Performed in 2009, this is from Sor's 24 Exercises composed c. 1828 (2:06)

=== Guitar sonatas ===
- Op. 14, Guitar Sonata No. 1 in D major (in one movement: Andante — Allegro) – wr. c. 1798; publ. 1810 in Paris as “Grand solo pour guitare”
- Op. 15b, Guitar Sonata No. 2 in C major (in one movement: Allegro moderato) – wr. c. 1800; publ. 1810 in Paris as “Sonate”
- Op. 22, Guitar Sonata No. 3 in C major (four movements: Allegro — Adagio — Menuetto — Rondo) – publ. June 1807 in Madrid; publ. again 1825 in Paris as “Grande sonate”
- Op. 25, Guitar Sonata No. 4 in C major (four movements: Andante largo — Allegro non troppo — Andantino grazioso — Menuetto) – wr. 1826 in Moscow; publ. 1827 in Paris as “Deuxième grande sonate”

=== Fantasies ===
- Op. 4, Fantasy No. 1 in A major – publ. 1814
- Op. 7, Fantasy No. 2, or Largo non tanto in C minor followed by Theme and Variations in C major – publ. 1814, ded. Ignaz Pleyel
- Op. 10, Fantasy No. 3 in F major – 1816
- Op. 12, Fantasy No. 4 in C major – 1821
- Op. 16, Fantasy No. 5, or Introduction, Theme and Variations on Nel cor più non mi sento by Paisiello – 1819
- Op. 21, Fantasy No. 6, Les adieux – 1825
- Op. 30, Fantasy No. 7, or Variations brillantes sur deux airs favoris connus (uses sonata form) – 1828
- Op. 40, Fantaisie sur un air favori écossais (Ye Banks and Braes) – 1829, ded. Mary Jane Burdett
- Op. 46, Souvenirs d'amitié (Fantasy) in A major – 1831, ded. Jules Regondi
- Op. 52, Fantaisie villageoise – 1832, ded. Dioniso Aguado
- Op. 58, Fantaisie facile in A minor – 1835, ded. Mme. Boischevalier
- Op. 59, Fantaisie élégiaque in E minor – 1835, on the death of Charlotte Beslay

=== Variations, excl. fantasies ===
- Op. 3, Varied Theme and Minuet – 1816
- Op. 9, Introduction and Variations on a Theme by Mozart – 1821, ded. Carlos Sor
- Op. 11, Two Varied Themes and Twelve Minuets – 1821
- Op. 15a, Les folies d'Espagne and a Minuet – 1810, rev. 1822
- Op. 15c, Varied Theme in C major – 1810, rev. 1822
- Op. 20, Introduction and Varied Theme – 1824
- Op. 26, Introduction and Variations on Que ne suis-je la fougère! – 1827
- Op. 27, Introduction and Variations on Gentil houssard – 1827
- Op. 28, Introduction and Variations on Malbroug (Marlborough) s’en va-t-en guerre – 1827

=== Didactic music ===
- Op. 6, Twelve Studies (First Book) – 1815
- Op. 23, Cinquième divertissement très facile in D major – 1825
- Op. 29, Twelve Studies (Second Book) – 1827
- Op. 31, Leçons progressives (24 Progressive Lessons) – 1828
- Op. 35, Exercices très faciles (24 Very Easy Exercises) – 1828
- Op. 44a, 24 Progressive Studies – 1831
- Op. 44b, Six Easy Waltzes, for two guitars – 1831, ded. Mlle. Lira
- Op. 45, Voyons si c'est ça: 6 Easy Pieces – 1831
- Op. 48, Est-ce bien ça?: 6 Easy Pieces – 1832
- Op. 55, Three Easy Duets – 1833
- Op. 60, 25 Progressive Studies – 1837
- Op. 61, Three Easy Duets – 1837

=== Guitar duos, excl. didactic music ===
- Op. 34, L’encouragement (Fantasy), duet in E major – 1828
- Op. 38, Divertissement, duet in G major – 1829, ded. Mrs. Dühring
- Op. 39, Six Waltzes, for two guitars – 1830, ded. Mlle. Natalie Houzé
- Op. 41, The Two Friends, for two guitars – 1830, ded. Dioniso Aguado
- Op. 49, Divertissement militaire, for two guitars – 1832, ded. Mlle. S. Talbot
- Op. 53, The First Step, duet – 1833
- Op. 54b, Fantasy, duet – 1833, ded. Mlle. Natalie Houzé
- Op. 62, Divertissement, duet in E major – 1837, ded. N. Coste
- Op. 63, Remembrances of Russia, duet in E minor – 1837, ded. N. Coste

=== Divertimentos, waltzes, short pieces and other pieces ===
- Op. 1, Six divertissements pour la guitare – 1813
- Op. 2, Six divertissements pour la guitare – 1813
- Op. 5, Six petites pièces très faciles – 1814
- Op. 8, Six divertissements – 1818, ded. Miss Smith
- Op. 13, Six divertissements – 1819
- Op. 17, Six Waltzes – 1823, ded. Mr. Pastou
- Op. 18, Six Waltzes – 1823
- Op. 19, Six Airs from The Magic Flute – 1824
- Op. 24, Huit petites pièces – 1826
- Op. 32, Six petites pièces – 1828, ded. Mlle. Wainewright
- Op. 33, Trois pièces de société (First Set) – 1828, ded. Mlle. Athénaïs Paulian
- Op. 36, Trois pièces de société (Second Set) - 1828, ded. Mr. Pastou
- Op. 37, Serenade in E major – 1829, ded. Mlle. S. Talbot
- Op. 42, Six Short Pieces – 1830, ded. Mlle. Natalie Houzé
- Op. 43, Mes ennuis: Six Bagatelles – 1831
- Op. 47, Six Short Pieces – 1832, ded. Mlle. Crabouillet
- Op. 50, Capriccio in E major, Le Calme – 1832, ded. Mlle. Crabouillet
- Op. 51, A la bonne heure: Six Waltzes – 1832
- Op. 54a, Concert Piece – 1832, ded. Son Altesse Royale la Princesse Adélaïde
- Op. 56, Souvenirs d'une soirée à Berlin – date unknown
- Op. 57, Six Waltzes and a Gallop – 1834, ded. Mlle. Larivée

== Works without opus numbers ==
=== Orchestral music ===
==== Symphonies ====
- Symphony No. 1 in C
- Symphony No. 2 in E♭
- Symphony No. 3 in F

==== Incidental music ====
- La Elvira portuguesa (Madrid, 1804)

==== Ballets ====
- La foire de Smyrne (1821, Paris — the music is lost)
- Le seigneur généreux (1821, London — the music is lost)
- Cendrillon (1822, London; 1823, Paris)
- Alphonse et Léonore, ou L'amant peintre (1823, London in one act; enlarged to three acts for Moscow the next year; revised in 1827 as Le sicilien, ou L'amour peintre for Paris)
- Hercule et Omphale (1826, St Petersburg)
- Hassan et le calife, ou Le dormeur éveillé (1828, London — the music is lost)
- The Fair Sicilian, or Conquered Coquette, or La belle Arsène (1834, London — the music is lost)
- Arsène, ou La baguette magique (1839, Brussels)

==== Concerto (spurious) ====
- Violin Concerto in G major — falsely attributed; actually written by Chevalier de Saint-Georges and published in 1773 as the latter's Op.2, No.1

=== Chamber music ===
- 3 string quartets
- String trios with guitar
- La romanesca for flute (or violin) and guitar
- March for Military Band — the music is lost
- March for the Funeral of Czar Alexander I — the music exists both in manuscript and printed version for piano

Piano 4-hands

- 3 Waltzes (First Set) — the music is lost
- 3 Waltzes (Second Set, 1818) ded. Mlle. F. Rehausen
- 3 Waltzes (Third Set, 1819) ded. Ladies Jane & Georgina Paget
- 3 Waltzes (Fourth Set, 1820) ded. Ladies Augusta & Agnes Paget
- 3 Waltzes (Fifth Set, 1820) ded. Mlle. B. Bollman
- 3 Waltzes (Sixth Set, 1821) ded. Miss A. McDougall
- 3 Waltzes (Seventh Set, 1821) ded. Mrs. Ellis Heaton
- 3 Waltzes (Eighth Set, 1822) ded. Miss Adolphus
- 3 Waltzes (Ninth Set, advertised but never published in England, 1826 in Paris)
- 3 Waltzes (Tenth Set, 1823) ded. Miss Waldengraves
- 3 Waltzes arranged after music by Sor, Mozart and Mohor (First Set, 1820)
- 3 Waltzes arranged after music by Mohor, Mozart and Steibelt (Second Set, 1822)
- Sonata in G Minor on Swedish National Airs (1815) ded. Baroness de Rehausen
- Arrangement of the Funeral March for harp guitar
- Arrangement of the Military March for guitar

=== Instrumental music ===
for guitar

- fifty-eight minuets
- Air varié in C major
- Boléro for 2 guitars
- Fantasia in D major
- La candeur: Petite rêverie (Ingenuity: Little Dream)
- March from the ballet Cendrillon
- Thème varié
- Romance d'amour

for harpolyre

- 3 pieces (pub. 1830)
- 6 Petites pièces progressives (pub. 1830)
- Marche funèbre

for piano

- 22 Waltzes (First Set, 1819)
- 6 Waltzes (Second Set, 1820)
- Les Cuirassiers (6 pieces, 1821)
- Les Favorites des Salons (6 pieces, 1821)
- Les Choisies (6 pieces, 1822)
- Mazurka
- Arrangement of the Funeral March for harp guitar
- Trois Valses et un Galop (dedicated to Mademoiselle Thomas)

=== Vocal music ===
Sacred scores

- Ave maris stella in D minor
- Exultet coelum laudibus in C major
- O Crux, ave in D minor
- O Salutaris hostia in E♭ major

Secular cantatas

- Cantata a S.E. la Signora Duchessa d'Albufera
- Draps i ferro vell
- Himno para el cumpleaños de S.M. La Reina Gobernadora de España

Songs and arias

- Seguidillas For voice and guitar or piano – 1800–8
  - 1. Cesa de atormentarme (Stop tormenting me)
  - 2. De amor en las prisiones (Of love in the prisons)
  - 3. Acuérdate bien, mío (Remember well, mine)
  - 4. Prepárame la tumba (Prepare mi tomb)
  - 5. Cómo ha de resolverse? (How should it be resolved?)
  - 6. Muchacha ... y la verguenza? (Young woman ... and the shame?)
  - 7. Si dices que mis ojos (If you say that my eyes)
  - 8. Los Canónigos, madre (The canons, mother)
  - 9. El que quisiera amando (He who wants to while loving)
  - 10. Si a otro cuando me quieres (If to another while you love me)
  - 11. Las Mujeres y cuerdas (The women and strings)
  - 12. Mis descuidados ojos (My careless eyes)
- 13 seguidillas or boleros for voice and guitar or piano
- 33 arias

=== Operas ===
- Telemaco nell'isola di Calipso (25 August 1797, Barcelona, Teatre de la Santa Creu)
- Don Trastullo [lost]

== Didactic works ==
- Méthode pour la guitare
- École de la mesure (includes 22 pieces for piano 4-hands)
