= Telemaque =

Telemaque, the French name for the Greek mythological figure Telemachus, may refer to:

== Opera ==
- Télémaque (Campra), a 1704 opera by André Campra
- Télémaque (Destouches), a 1714 opera by André Cardinal Destouches

== People ==
- Darwin Telemaque (born 1968), Dominican footballer
- Denmark Vesey (1767–1822), American rebel slave known as Telemaque while enslaved
- Hervé Télémaque (1937–2022), French painter
- Myriam Telemaque, Seychellois politician
- Vaughn Telemaque (born 1990), American football player

== See also ==
- Les Aventures de Télémaque, a 1699 novel
- Télémaque dans l'île de Calypso, a 1790 ballet
- Telemaco (disambiguation)
- Telemachus (disambiguation)
