= Euripus Bridge =

Euripus Bridge Υψηλή Γέφυρα Ευρίπου
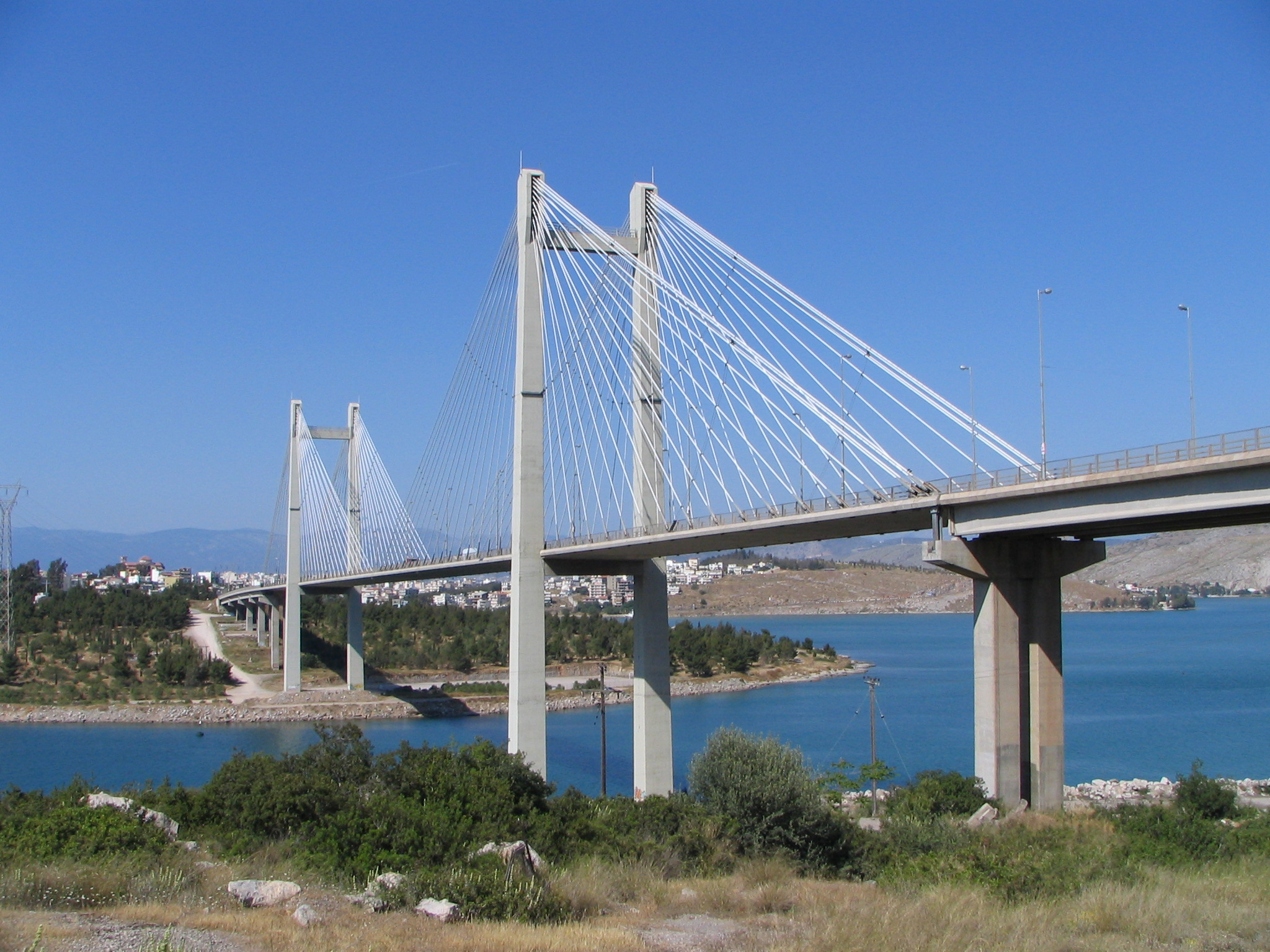
- The bridge in May 2007
- Coordinates: 38°26′42″N 23°35′27″E
- Crosses: Euripus Strait
- Locale: Chalcis, Euboea, Greece
- Begins: Micro Vathi
- Ends: Euboea
- Official name: High Bridge of Evripos (or Euripos or Euripus)
- Other name: New Bridge of Chalkida

Characteristics
- Design: cable-stayed
- Material: Concrete
- Total length: 694.5 metres (2,279 ft) (including approaches)
- Width: 13.50 metres (44 ft 3 in)
- Height: 34.5 metres (113 ft)
- Longest span: 215 metres (705 ft)
- No. of spans: 3
- No. of lanes: 2 carriageways + 2 pedestrian sidewalks

History
- Designer: S. Schleich
- Constructed by: Volos Technical Company SA; Hellenic Technodomiki SA
- Construction start: May 1985
- Opened: 9 July 1993; 32 years ago

Location
- Interactive map of Euripus Bridge

Euripus Bridge (also Euripos Bridge, Evripos Bridge; Greek: Γέφυρα Ευρίπου) is a 395-metre-long (1,296 ft) cable-stayed bridge located in Chalcis that crosses the Euripus Strait, the central and narrowest part of the channel separating the island of Euboea from the Greek mainland.

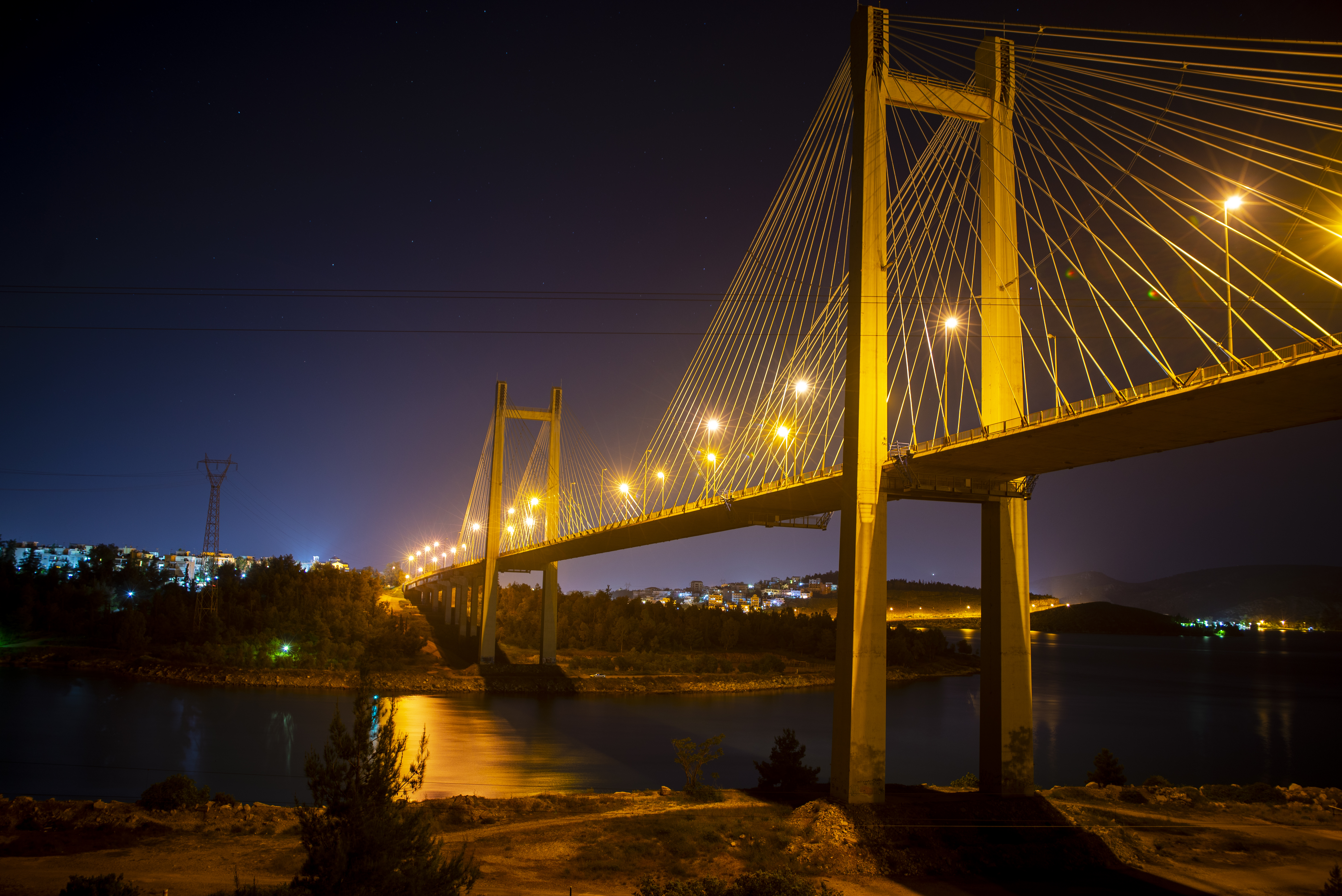
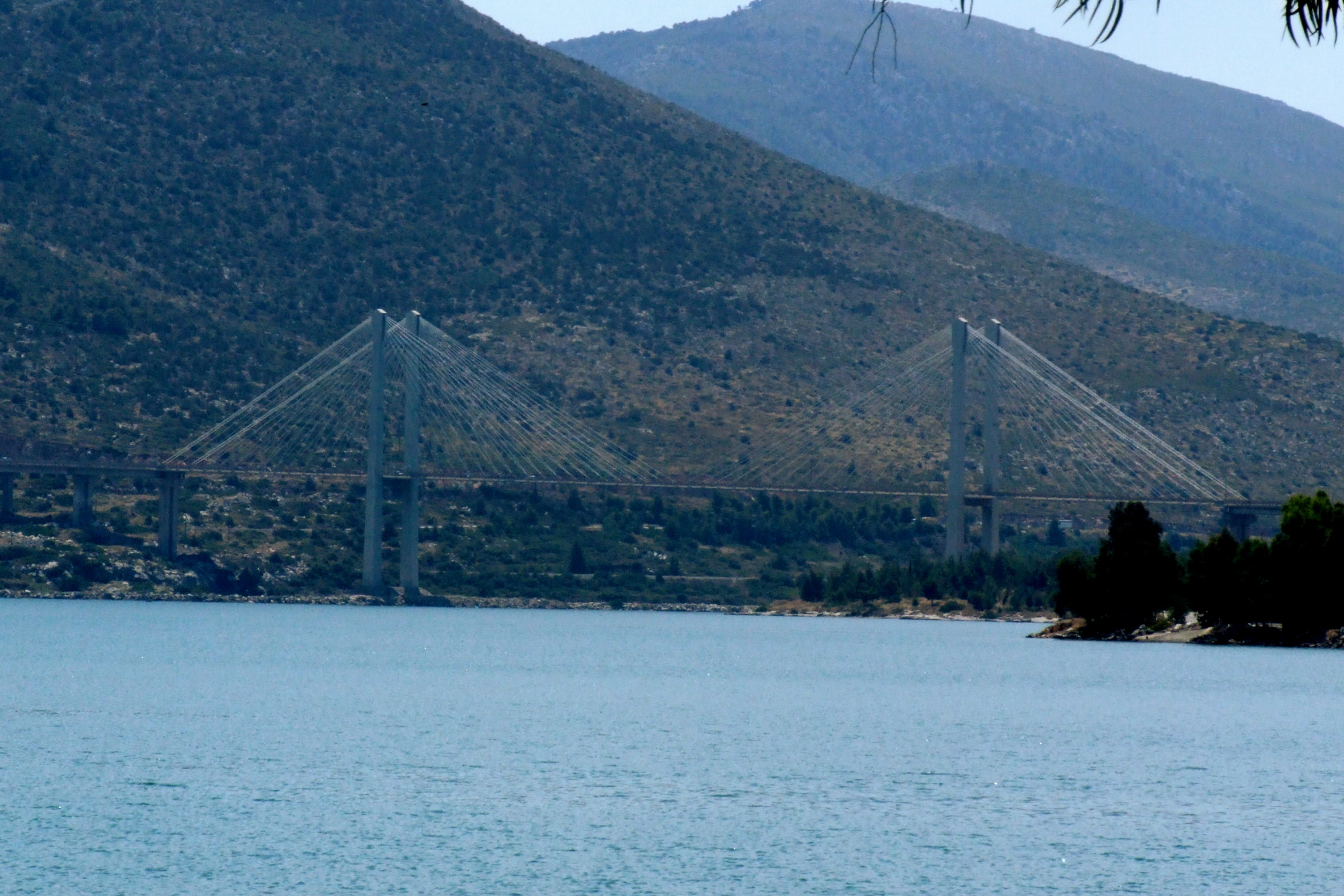
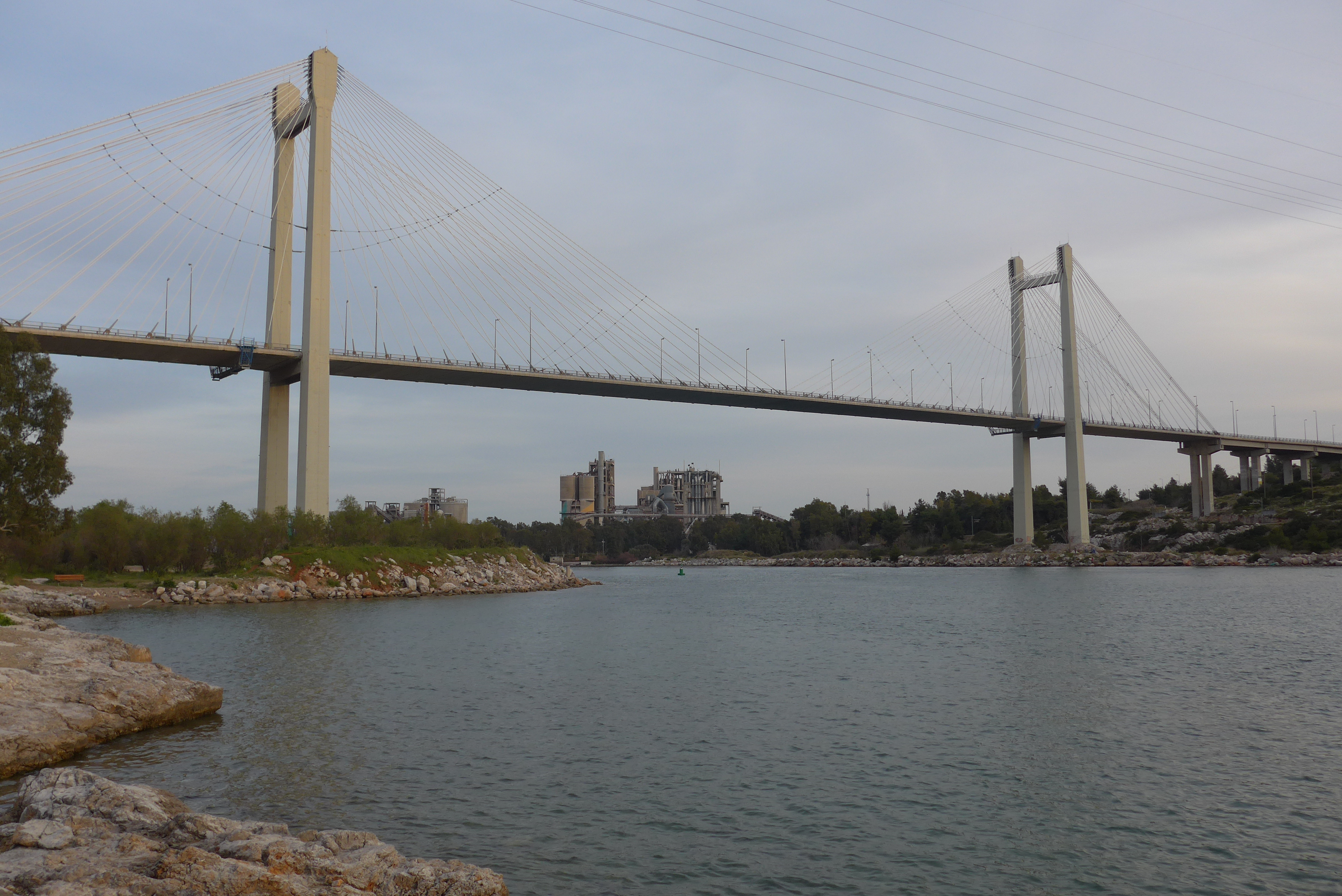
Built in 1992, the bridge was the first cable-stayed road bridge in Greece. A technical challenge during the design and the construction phase was the extremely slender (L/480) longitudinally and transversally pre-stressed concrete deck with only 45 centimetres (18 in) constant thickness, providing sufficient stiffness to omit longitudinal girders. The multi-strand stay-cables therefore have a closer spacing of approximately 5 metres (16 ft) with a minimum inclination of 23 degrees (0.4 rad) and were directly used to support the free cantilever form-works during deck construction. For purpose of higher seismic performance, the concrete deck is monolithically connected with the towers. Constrained reaction due to temperature rise can be handled well due to the slender towers and the soft superstructure. At the transition piers at the bridge ends hinged tension pendulum members are used to transfer uplift forces into the substructure.

== Technical data ==
- Total length: 395 metres (1,296 ft)
- Main bridge span lengths: 90 + 215 + 90 metres (295 + 705 + 295 ft)
- Bridge deck width: 13.50 metres (44 ft 3 in) (2 carriageways + 2 pedestrian sidewalks)
- Deck surface: 5,390 square metres (58,000 sq ft)
- Tower height: 90 metres (300 ft) (approximately 45 metres (150 ft) above and 45 metres (150 ft) below deck level)
- Thickness of the concrete deck: 45 centimetres (18 in)
