= Euripus Strait =

Greek strait separating Euboea from the mainland

Coordinates: 38°27′46″N 23°35′22″E

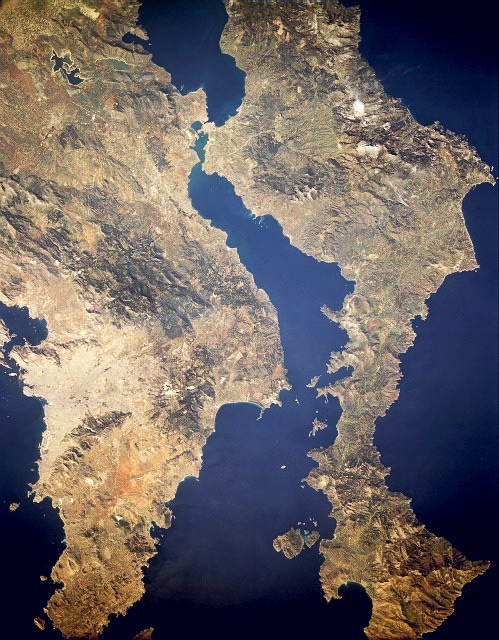
Satellite image showing the Euripus Strait between Boeotia (left) and Euboea. Two bridges span the two narrowest points across the strait

The Euripus Strait (Greek: Εύριπος [ˈevripos]) is a narrow channel of water separating the Greek island of Euboea in the Aegean Sea from Boeotia in mainland Greece. The strait's principal port is Chalcis on Euboea, located at the strait's narrowest point. The strait connects the North Euboean Gulf and South Euboean Gulf.

The strait is subject to strong tidal currents which reverse direction approximately four times a day. Tidal flows are very weak in the Eastern Mediterranean, but the strait is a remarkable exception. Water flow peaks at about 12 kilometres per hour (7.5 mph; 6.5 kn), either northwards or southwards, and lesser vessels are often incapable of sailing against it. When nearing flow reversal, sailing is even more precarious because of vortex formation.

The Swiss scholar François-Alphonse Forel contributed to an understanding of the enigmatic phenomenon by his study of limnology and the discovery of seiche, where layers of water of differing temperature oscillate in thickness in a confined body of water. But the problem was solved completely only by D. Eginitis, director of the Athens Observatory, who published his conclusions in 1929.

== Etymology ==
From Ancient Greek εὔριπος (eúrīpos, "any strait or narrow sea, where the flux and reflux is violent"); from εὖ (eû, "well") + ῥιπή (rhipḗ, “swing or force with which anything is thrown”), from ῥίπτω (rhíptō, "to throw").

== Bridges ==
There are two road bridges across the strait, both at Chalcis. One is the Euripus Bridge or Chalcis Bridge, a two-pylon, cable-suspended bridge built south of town in 1992, and commonly called the "New" or "High" bridge, with a span of about 215 m (705 ft). The strait is 160 m (525 ft) wide at this point. The bridge is accessible via a fork on the main road at Aulis.

The "Old" or "Low" or "Sliding" Bridge lies across midtown, and can slide away to allow shipping traffic. It is located at the narrowest point of the strait, where it is only 38 m (125 ft) wide. It accommodates two lanes of vehicular traffic. It was originally built as a retractable bridge in 1858, replaced by a rotating one in 1896. The existing, originally wooden bridge was built in 1962 and was extensively refurbished in 1998.

== History ==
The Euripus was closed by a dike of coarse sediment until about 6000 years ago, when it was opened by an (unrecorded) earthquake. Herodotus mentions the strait during his description of the Battle of Artemisium (480 BC), with the account implying that it was navigable by large fleets of triremes. Diodorus Siculus reports that in 411 BC the Euboeans closed the strait by mostly rebuilding the dike, with the goal of making themselves part of Boeotia, therefore not an island subject to Athenian hegemony. Diodorus states that gaps had to be left in the dike to allow the Euripus tides to flow through; the narrowness of the remaining passage made the current much more intense. Only a single passage was left navigable, just wide enough for a single ship. There is no mention of the closure of the strait in either Thucydides' History of the Peloponnesian War or Xenophon's Hellenica. Strabo wrote that at an unspecified later date the strait was crossed by a bridge two plethra long (approximately 50 m (160 ft), which is probably an exaggeration). Some vestiges of the artificial dike probably remained, so the gap spanned by the bridge could have been narrower than the channel that existed before 411 BC. Ancient historians do not record the depth of the channel; even the passage under Strabo's bridge may have been scoured by the tides to a depth sufficient for ancient shipping.

Procopius reports that during the reign of Emperor Justinian I (527 to 565 AD) there were two channels in the Euripus, the large original channel and a new narrower cleft to the east of it, so narrow that it could be crossed with a single plank of wood. This later stream was later widened to make the present shipping channel. At the time when Procopius wrote, the name of the fortress on the Euripus was probably "Euripus," which had become "Egripos" by 1204, and was adopted and slightly altered to "Nigriponte" by the Latins who occupied the place in 1205. (The name has nothing to do with any sort of "Black Bridge," except as a Veronese or Venetian joke, or folk-etymological corruption or re-interpretation in reference to the old bridge across the channel.)

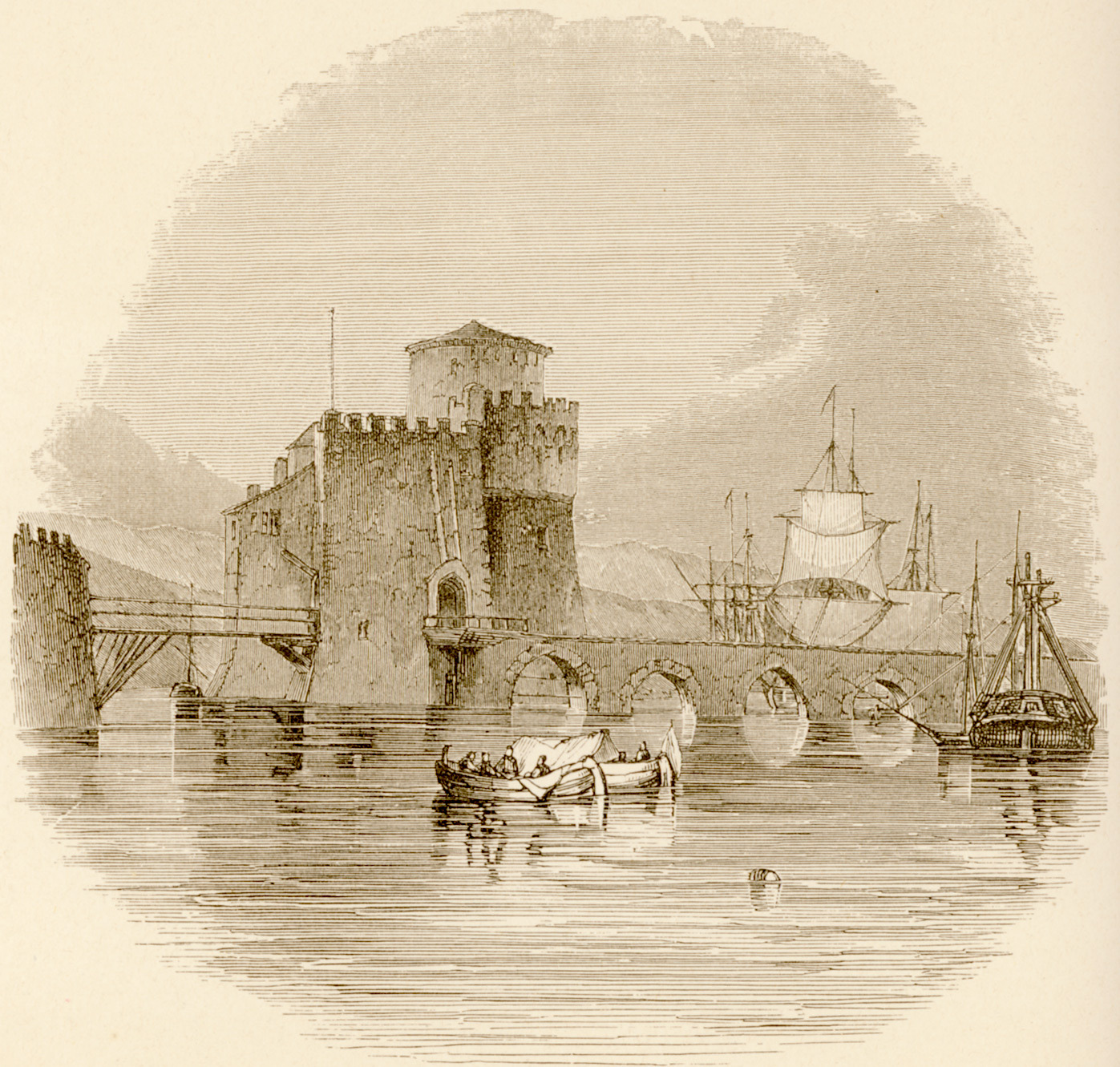
The Venetian tower and bridge over the Euripus, in the 19th century

In 1395, Nicola di Martoni came to Negropont during the return from his pilgrimage to Egypt and Palestine. He is clear that the main shipping channel in the Venetian period was on the side of the Boeotian mainland, and mentions the mills on the narrower channel, which he says were sometimes broken in the speed and turbulence of the flow there.

We have further information about the shipping channel and its single wooden bridge from various documents in the archives of the Venetian Empire. In 1408, the formation of a reef under the bridge severely affected shipping (http://www.archiviodistatovenezia.it/divenire/collezioni.htm Senato, Deliberazioni, Misti. 48,43v) and in 1439 there was concern over the tendency of the current to erode the surroundings of the pilings that supported the bridge (http://www.archiviodistatovenezia.it/divenire/collezioni.htm Senato, Deliberazioni, Misti. 60,140r–42r).

Evliya Çelebi, in his Travel Journal (SN VIII250a27, ff.), tells us that the narrow channel was first opened out enough for a galley to pass through at some time in the late 16th century, and was still just barely wide enough at the time of his visit in 1668 for a galley to squeeze through, even though the old shipping channel had been abandoned. By the end of the 18th century it was well on its way to being the width of the modern channel.

== See also ==
- List of Greek place names
