= Chalcis =

City on the island of Euboea, Greece

Chalcis Χαλκίδα
- Municipality
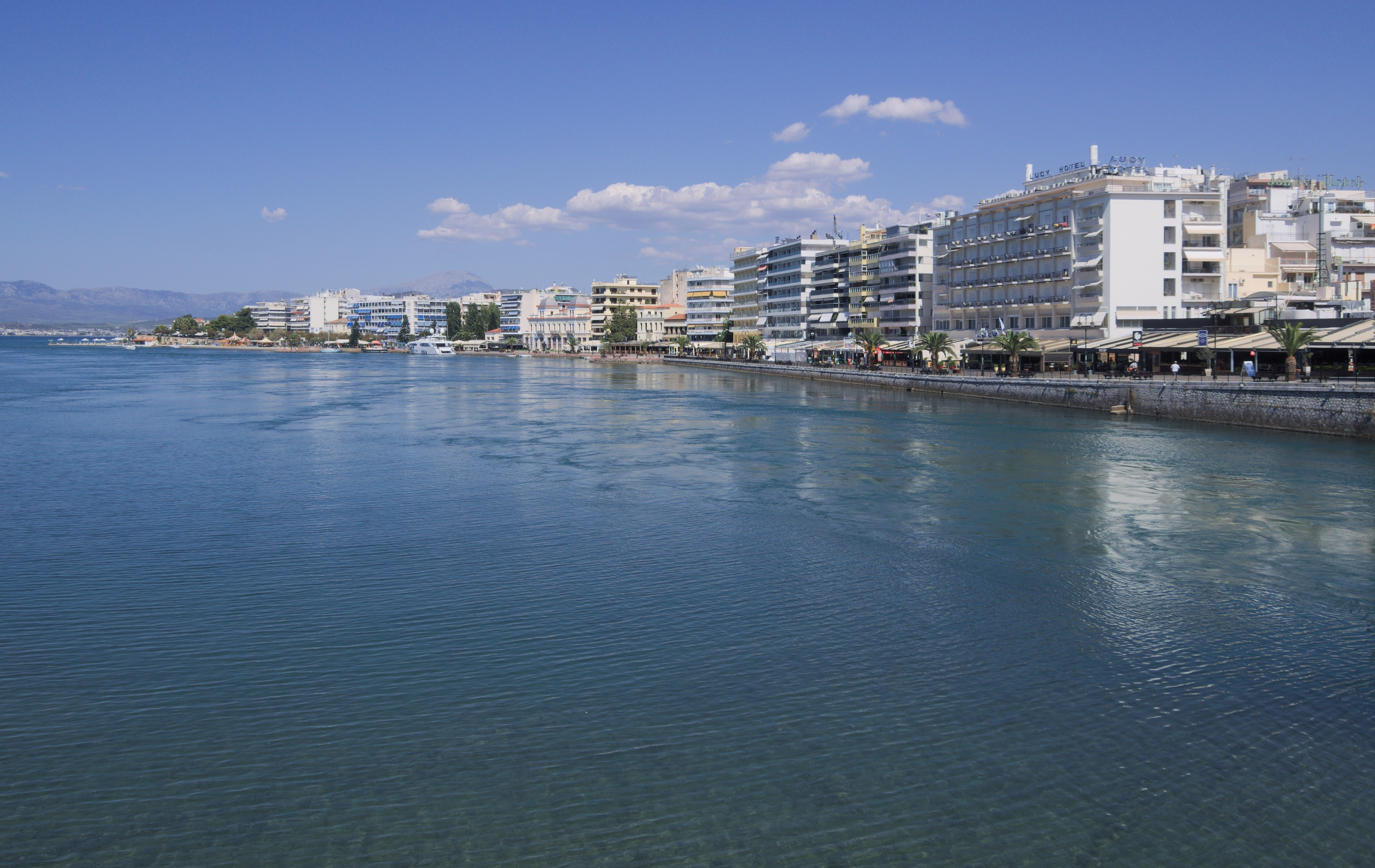
- Chalcis' seafront

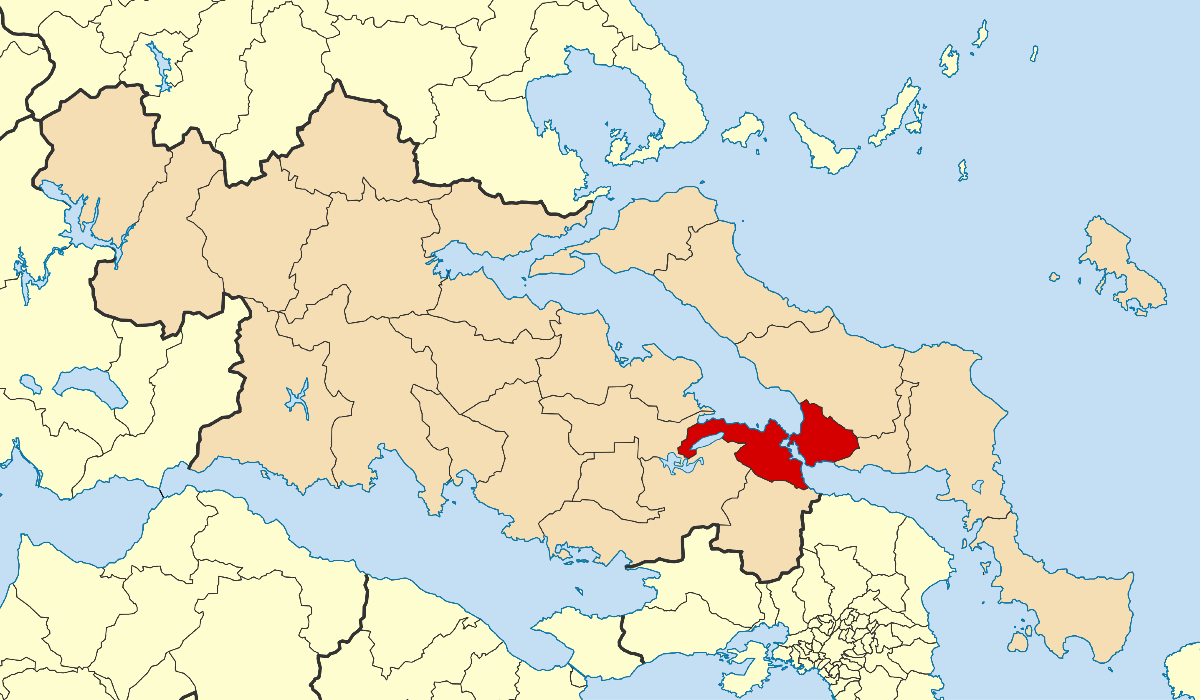

- Location within Greece
- Coordinates: 38°27′45″N 23°35′42″E
- Country: Greece
- Administrative region: Central Greece
- Regional unit: Euboea

Government
  - Mayor: Eleni Vaka (since 2019)

Area
  - Municipality: 424.77 km^{2} (164.00 sq mi)
  - Municipal unit: 30.80 km^{2} (11.89 sq mi)
- Elevation: 10 m (33 ft)

Population (2021)
  - Municipality: 109,256
  - Density: 257.21/km^{2} (666.18/sq mi)
  - Municipal unit: 64,490
  - Municipal unit density: 2,094/km^{2} (5,423/sq mi)
- Demonym: Chalcidian
- Time zone: UTC+2 (EET)
  - Summer (DST): UTC+3 (EEST)
- Postal code: 341 00
- Area code: 22210
- Vehicle registration: ΧΑ
- Website: www.dimoschalkideon.gr

Chalcis (/ˈkælsɪs/; Ancient Greek and Katharevousa: Χαλκίς, romanized: Chalkís), also called Chalkida or Halkida (Modern Greek: Χαλκίδα, pronounced [xalˈciða]), is the chief city of the island of Euboea in Greece, situated on the Euripus Strait at its narrowest point. The name is preserved from antiquity and is derived from the Greek χαλκός (copper, bronze), though there is no trace of any mines in the area. In the Late Middle Ages, it was known as Negropont(e), an Italian name that has also been applied to the entire island of Euboea.

== History ==
=== Ancient Greece ===
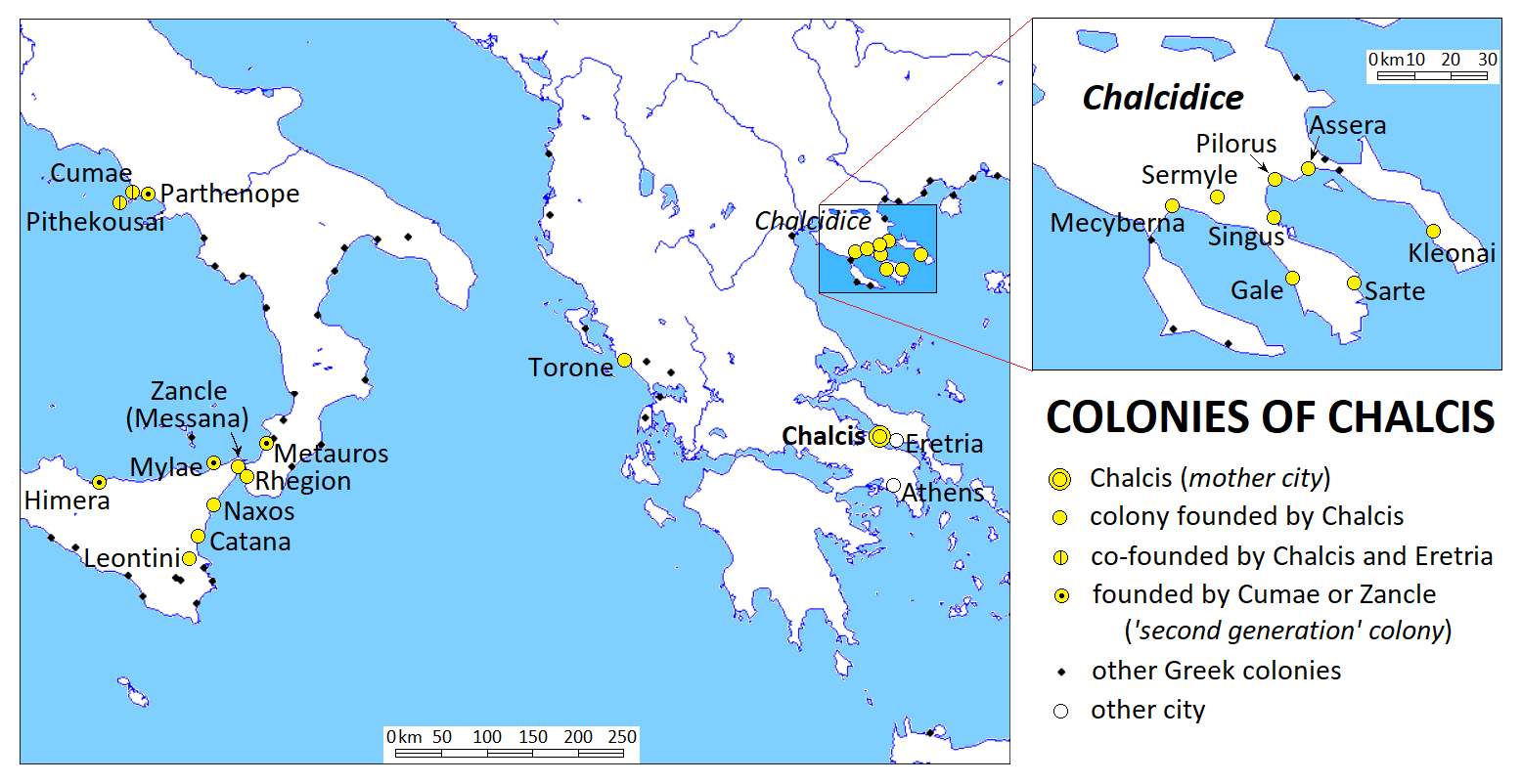
Colonies of ancient Chalcis

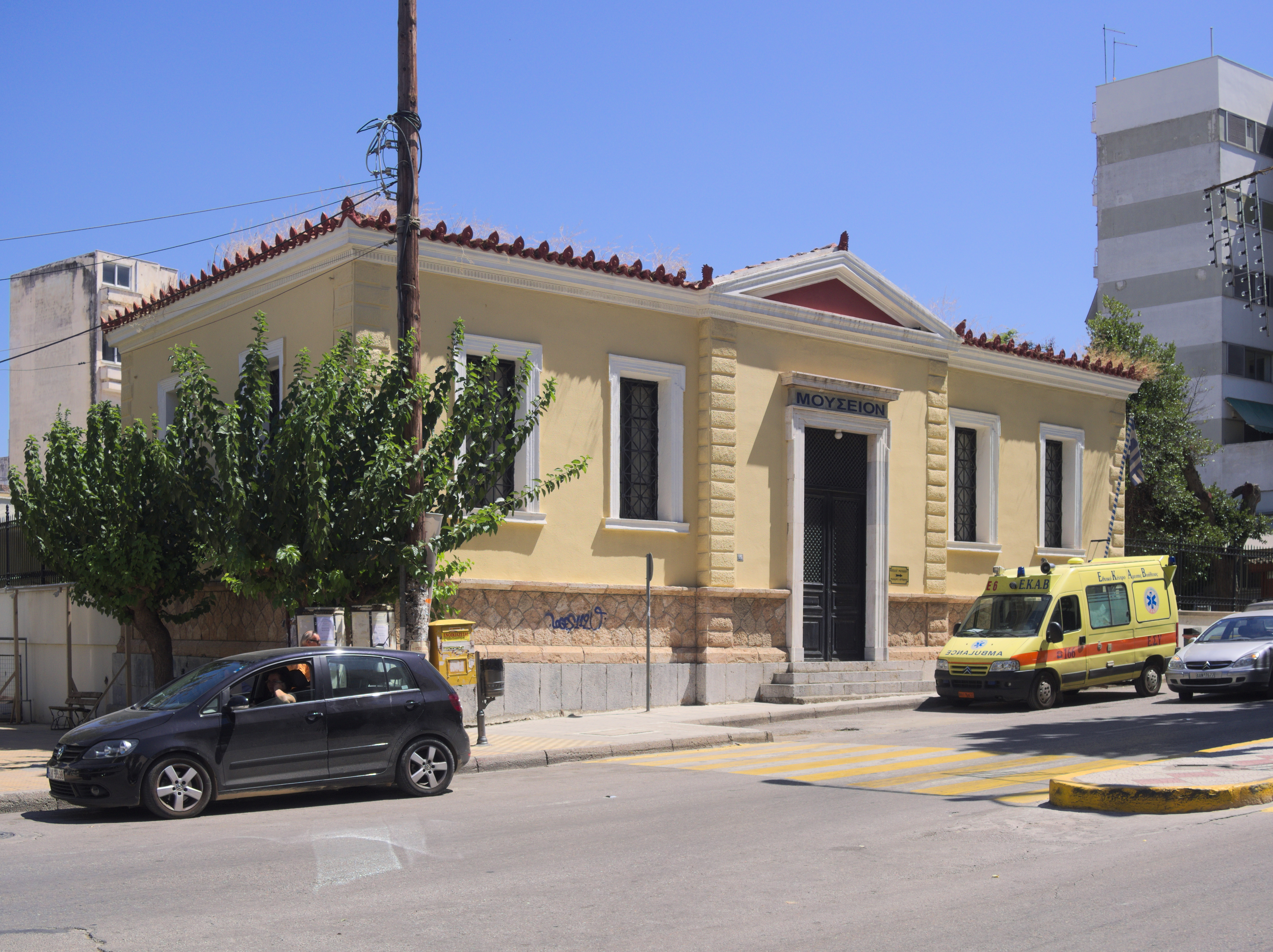
The Old Archaeological museum of Chalcis

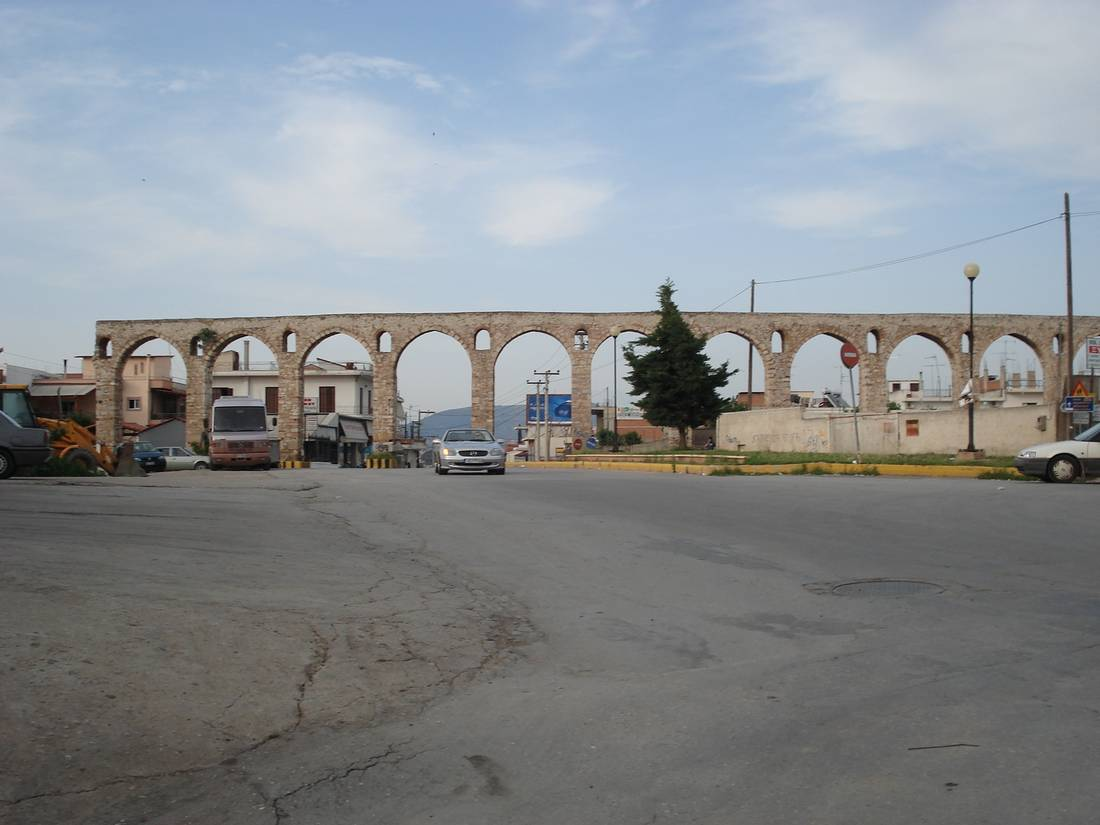
View of the ancient Roman aqueduct

The earliest recorded mention of Chalcis is in the Iliad, where it is mentioned in the same line as its rival Eretria. It is also documented that the ships set for the Trojan War gathered at Aulis, the south bank of the strait near the city. Chamber tombs at Trypa and Vromousa dated to the Mycenaean period were excavated by Papavasiliou in 1910. In the 8th and 7th centuries BC, colonists from Chalcis founded thirty townships on the peninsula of Chalcidice and several important cities in Magna Graecia and Sicily, such as Naxos, Rhegion, Zankle and Cumae. Its mineral produces, metal-work, purple, and pottery not only found markets among these settlements but were distributed over the Mediterranean in the ships of Corinth and Samos. The development of the city led consequently to the increase of the population and finally to the colonization with the establishment of many important cities in the West, but also in the Greek area.

The first recorded settlement in the West, which paved the way for the 2nd Greek colonization, is Pithecusae on the island of Ischia, in front of Naples, from Chalcidians and Eretrians around 770 BC. The etymology of the toponym "Pithikousa" comes from the pithos (pitharia) that the first settlers had with them to transport their products. Because of the first Chalcidian settlers, the Romans initially called all Greeks "Chalcidians", as they were the first Greeks they came into contact with. According to later tradition, around 730–720 BC the Chalcidian Antimnestos (Ancient Greek: Ἀντίμνηστος) was the founder of Rhegion; Thucydides names Perieres of Cumae and Crataemenes (Greek: Κραταιμένης) of Chalcis as the founders of Zancle (later Messana/Messina), around 730 BC. Thus the Chalcidians wanted to control the sea strait between Sicily and Italy, just as the Metropolis of Chalcis controlled the Euboean gulfs. In the 8th century BC the increase in trade between the Chalcidian colonies in lower Italy and Sicily with the local populations resulted in the spread of the Chalcidic alphabet among the most ancient inhabitants of the peninsula. The Etruscans took this alphabet and appropriated it so that they too could express themselves in writing. Over the centuries the Romans renamed it 'Latin'. So today, at least eight letters of all Latin-derived languages are the same as their ancient Euboic counterparts. They are C, D, F, P, R, S and X (pronounced ks). The transmission of the Chalcidic alphabet to the west is the most important cultural contribution of ancient Chalcis to the world culture.

The Lelantine War was a war fought in the late 8th century BC between the two powerful ancient states of Evia, Chalcis and Eretria, which at that time were at the height of their prosperity. This war was one of the first known major wars between ancient Greek cities and took pan-Hellenic dimensions as the warring Chalcidians and Eretrians allied themselves with other Greek cities.

As Herodotus mentions, the Samians allied with the Chalcidians, while the Milesians allied with the Eretrians. The Thessalians also allied with the Chalcidians, a fact mentioned by Plutarch. The historical sources provide evidence for only one battle of the war, undoubtedly the last, with the reference point being the death of the Thessalian Amphidamandas, who was praised by Hesiod. In this battle the help from the Thessalian cavalry resulted in victory for Chalcis, by which it acquired the best agricultural district of Euboea and became the chief city of the island. Late in the 6th century BC, its prosperity was broken by a disastrous war with the Athenians, who expelled the ruling aristocracy and settled a cleruchy on the site. Chalcis subsequently became a member of both the Delian Leagues.

Chalcis has had a Greco-Jewish presence since antiquity, which is sometimes claimed to have been continuous and to thus form Europe's oldest Jewish community, although there is no evidence of it through the early Middle Ages.

In the Hellenistic period, it gained importance as a fortress by which the Macedonian rulers controlled central Greece. It was used by kings Antiochus III of Syria (192 BC) and Mithradates VI of Pontus (88 BC) as a base for invading Greece. Characteristic is the fact that in 323 BC the Stagerite philosopher Aristotle comes to Chalcis to die the following year at his mother's house. Then during the Hellenistic era, settlers from Chalcis founded Chalcis in Syria, by order of Seleucus I, from which settlers founded another Chalcis in the Lebanon Valley, as well as another Chalcis in Arabia.

Under Roman rule, Chalcis retained a measure of commercial prosperity within the province of Achaea (southern Greece).

=== Middle Ages and early Modern period ===
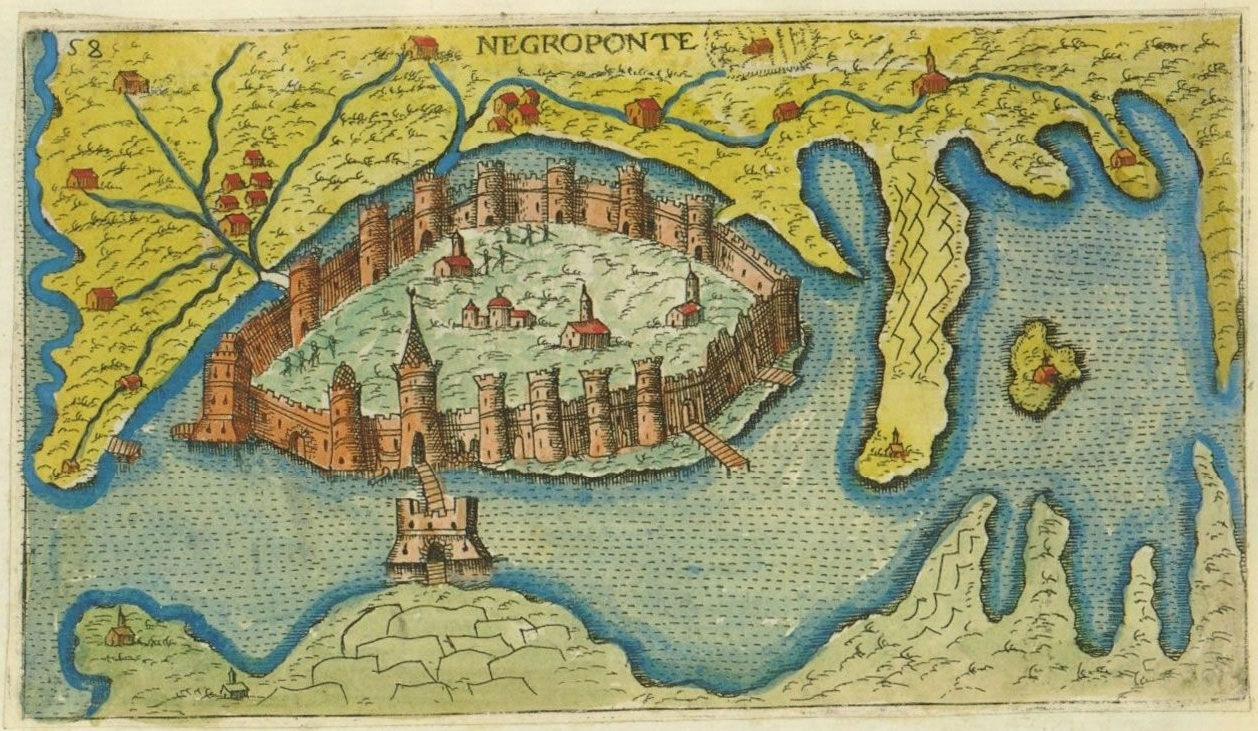
Venetian map of Chalcis (Negroponte) (1597)

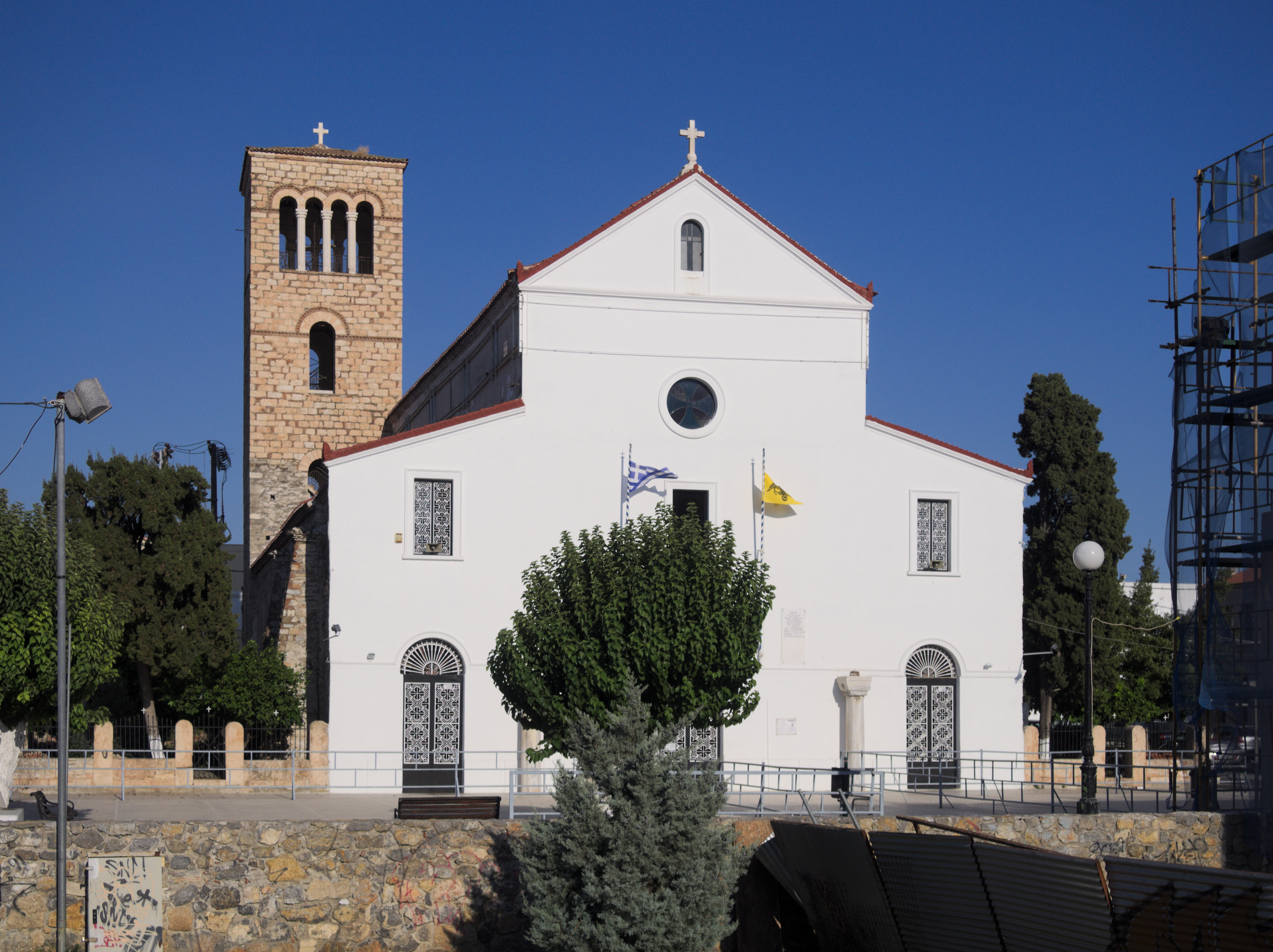
Church of Saint Paraskevi, patron saint of Chalcis

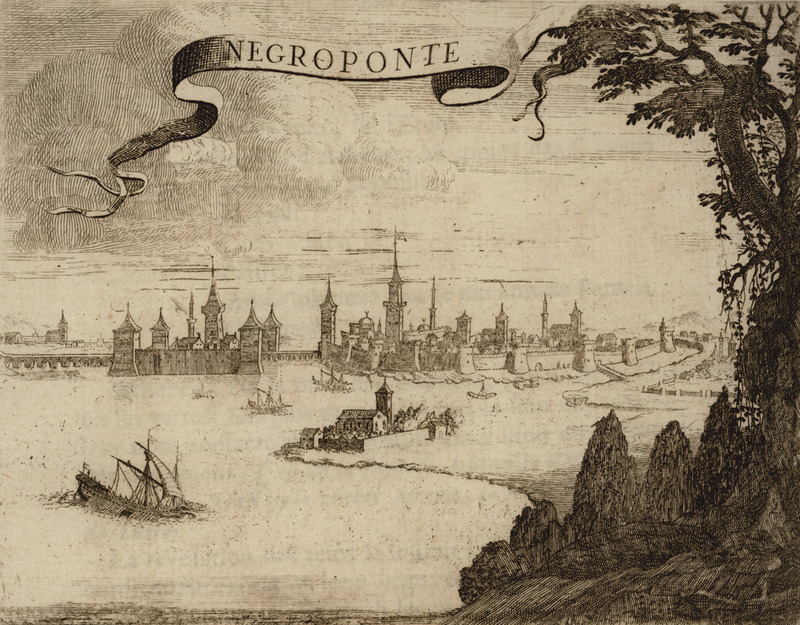
Negroponte by Vincenzo Coronelli, 1687

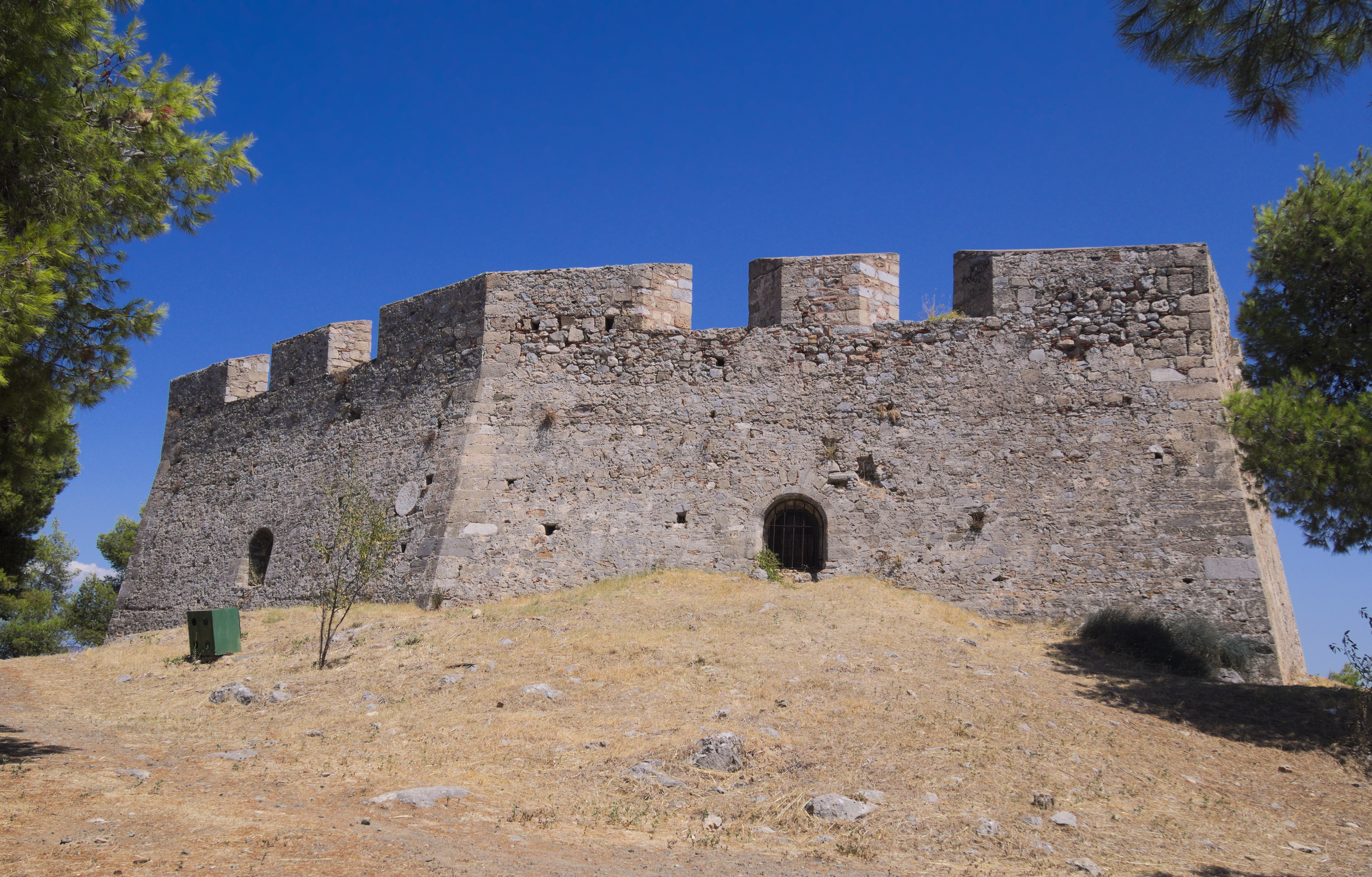
The Ottoman fortress of Karababa

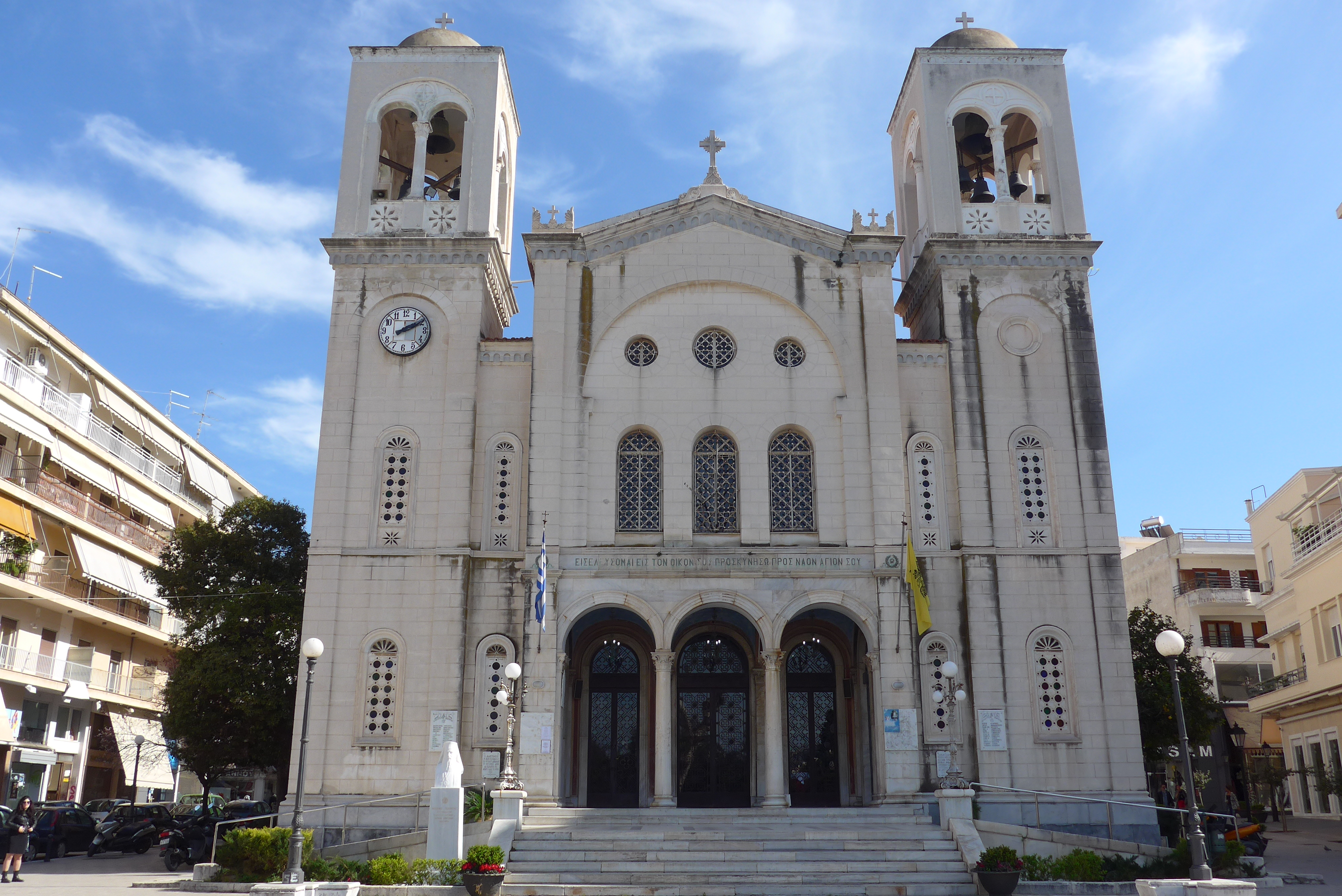
St Nicholas church

It is recorded as a city in the 6th-century Synecdemus and mentioned by the contemporary historian Procopius of Caesarea, who recorded that a movable bridge linked the two shores of the strait. In Byzantine times, Chalcis was usually called Euripos, a name also applied to the entire island of Euboea, although the ancient name survived in administrative and ecclesiastical usage until the 9th century; alternatively, it is possible that the name was given anew to a settlement that was founded in the 9th century in the location of the ancient city, after the latter had been abandoned in the early Middle Ages. The town survived an Arab naval raid in the 880s and its bishop is attested in the 869–870 Church council held at Constantinople.

By the 12th century, the town featured a Venetian trading station, being attacked by the Venetian fleet in 1171 and eventually seized by Venice in 1209, in the aftermath of the Fourth Crusade.

For Westerners, its common name was Negropont or Negroponte. This name comes indirectly from the Greek name of the Euripus Strait: the phrase στὸν Εὔριπον 'to Evripos', was rebracketed as στὸ Νεὔριπον 'to Nevripos', and became Negroponte in Italian by folk etymology, the ponte 'bridge' being interpreted as the bridge of Chalcis to Boeotia.

The town was a condominium between Venice and the Veronese barons of the rest of Euboea, known as the "triarchs", who resided there. Chalcis or Negroponte became a Latin Church diocese, see below. A large hoard of late medieval jewellery dating from Venetian times was found in Chalcis Castle in the nineteenth century and is now in the British Museum. The synagogue dated to around 1400.

Negroponte played a significant role in the history of Frankish Greece, and was attacked by the Principality of Achaea in the War of the Euboeote Succession (1257–58), the Catalan Company in 1317, the Turks in 1350–51, until it was finally captured by the Ottoman Empire after a long siege in 1470. That siege is the subject of the Rossini opera Maometto II. The Ottomans made it the seat of the Admiral of the Archipelago (the Aegean Islands). In 1688, it was successfully held by the Ottomans against a strong Venetian attack.

=== The modern town ===
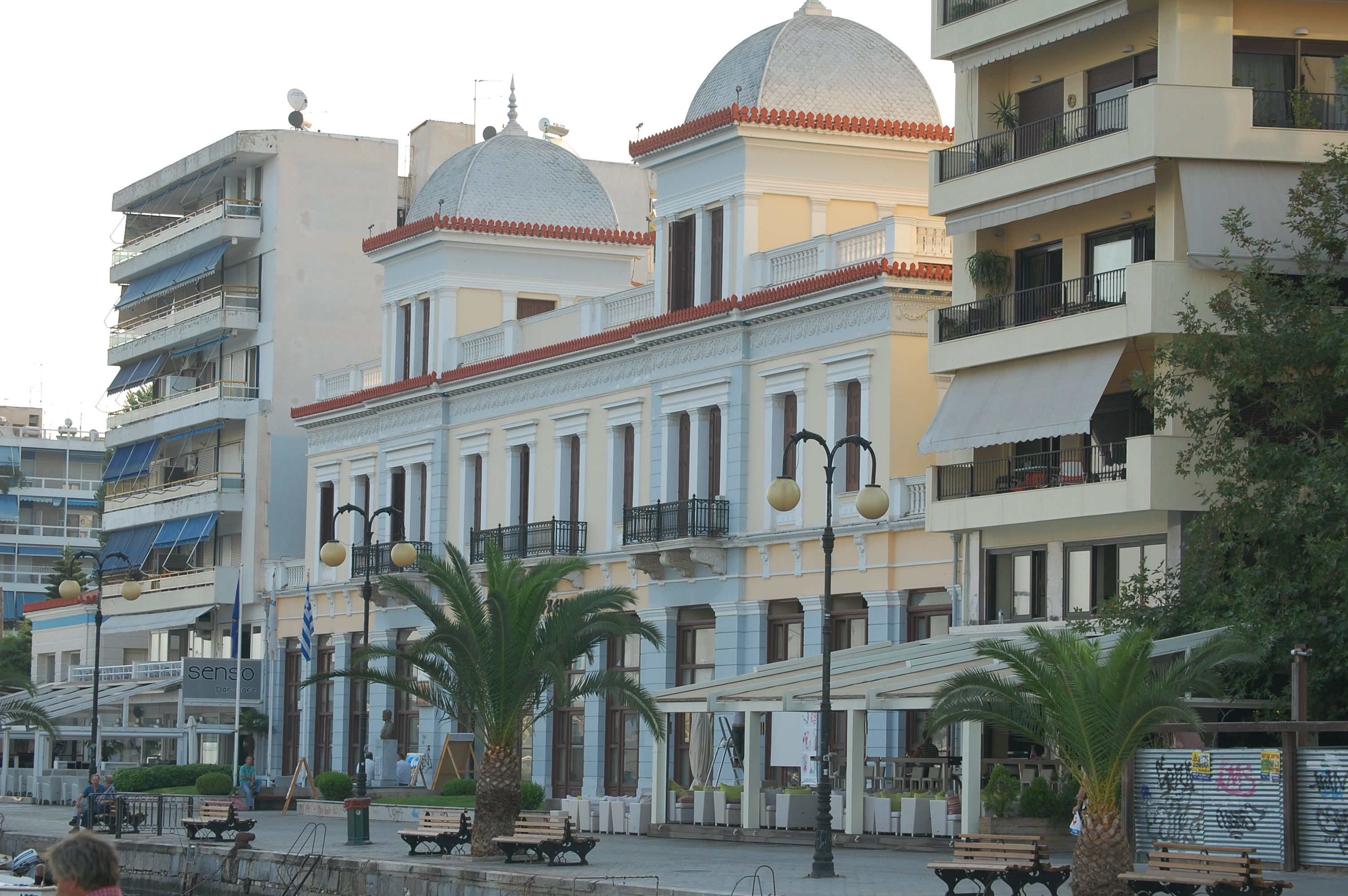
The city hall

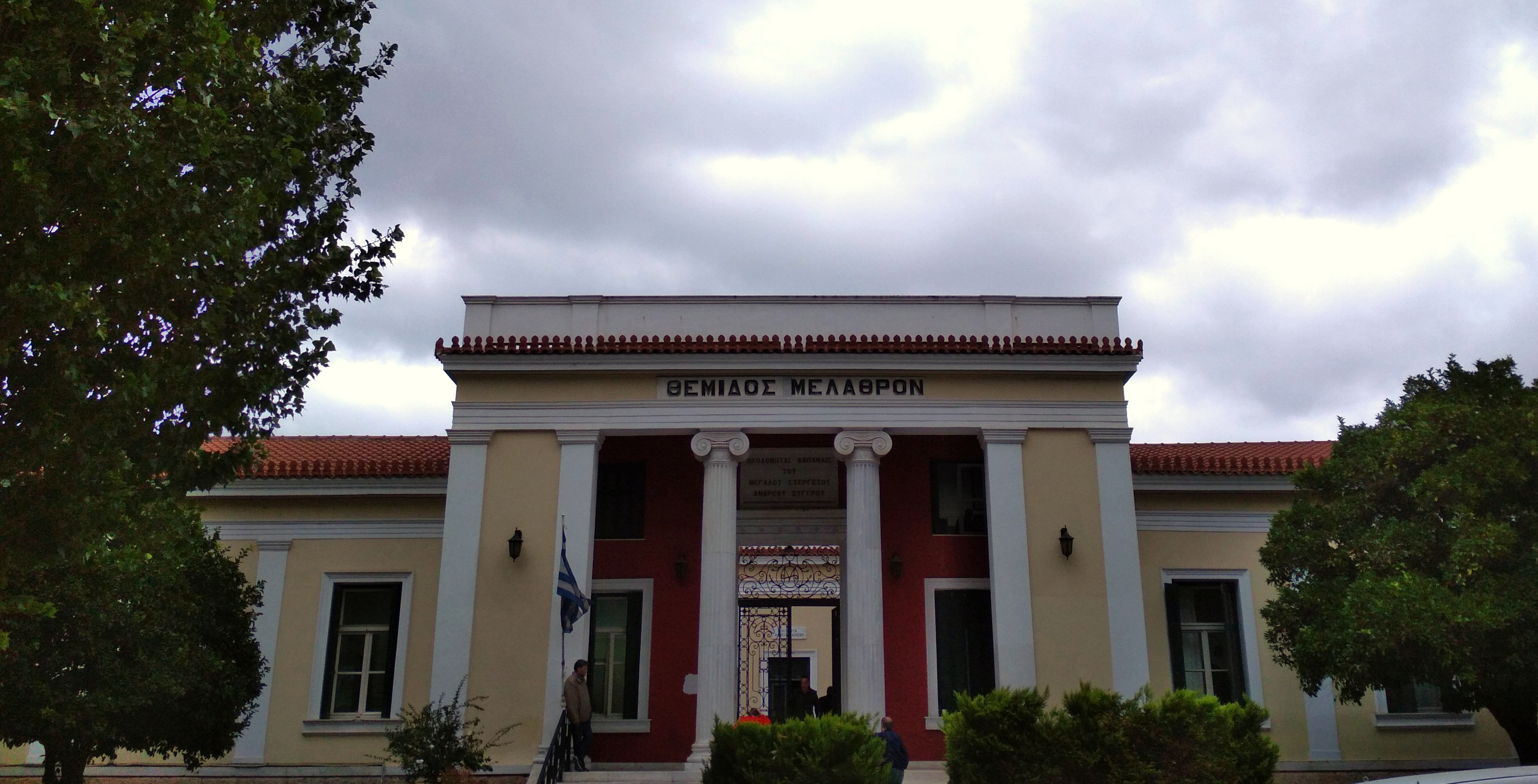
Courthouse

Chalcis became part of the newborn Greek state after the Greek War of Independence. The modern town received an impetus in its export trade from the establishment of railway connection with Athens and its port Piraeus in 1904. In the early 20th century it was composed of two parts—the old walled town at the bridge over the Euripus, where a number of Turkish families continued to live until the late 19th century, and a sizeable Jewish community lived until World War II, and the more modern suburb that lies outside it, chiefly occupied by Greeks. After the 1923 population exchange between Greece and Turkey the city received an influx of refugees, who by the 1928 census made up 27,1% of its population. This resulted in the creation of multiple new neighbourhoods.

The old town, called the Castro (citadel), was surrounded by a full circuit of defense walls until they were completely razed for urban development around the start of the 20th century.

The city is served by a railway station and is the terminus for the Athens Suburban Railway to Athens.

There is a Holocaust memorial honoring the Jewish lives lost during World War II outside of the Chalcis Jewish cemetery.

== Ecclesiastical history ==
=== Greek bishopric ===
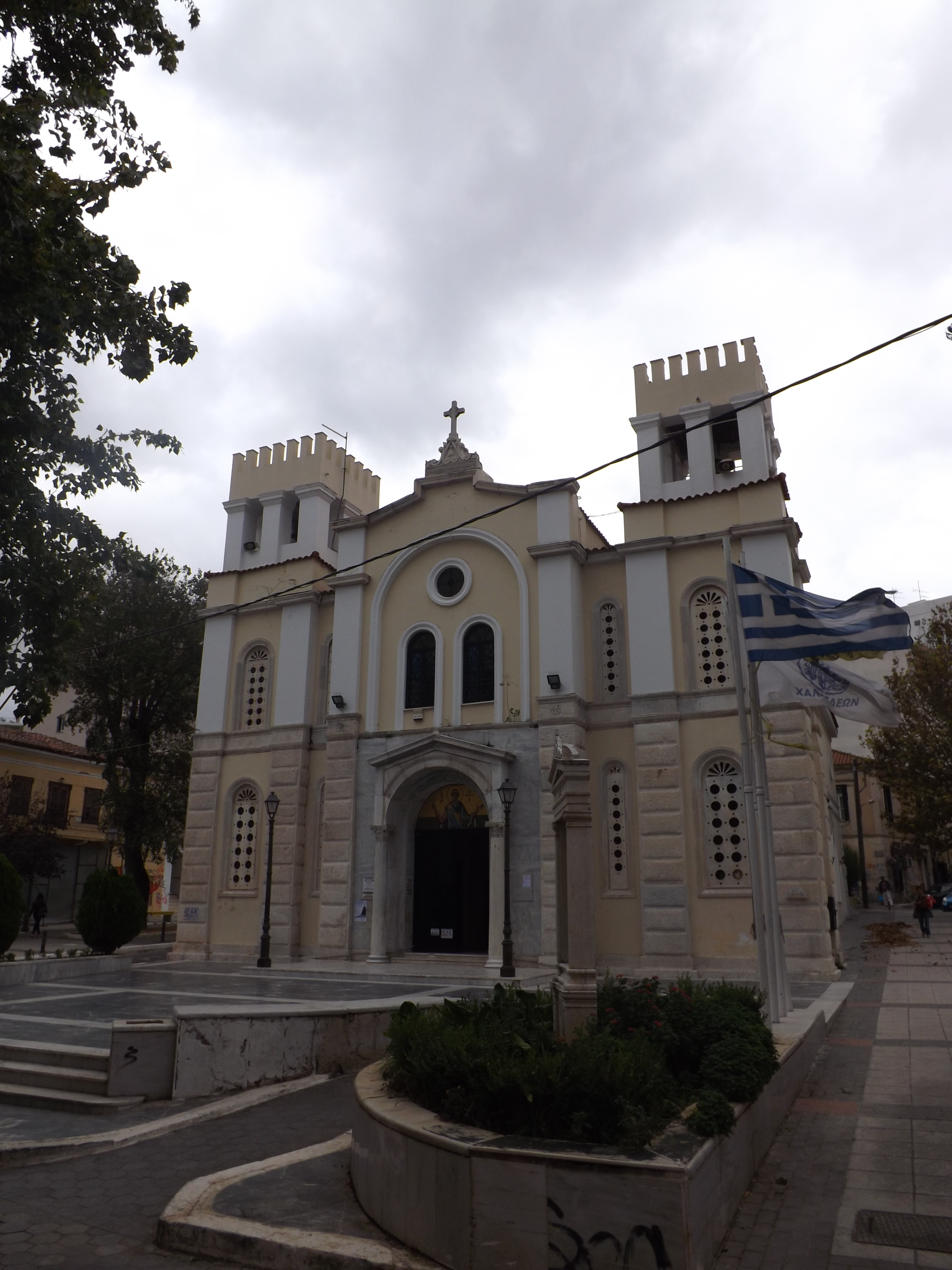
Saint Dimitrios church

The Byzantine diocese of Chalcis was initially a suffragan of the Archdiocese of Corinth, but in the 9th century was transferred to the Metropolitan of Athens, remaining in the sway of the Patriarchate of Constantinople. It was also known as Euripo, like it is mentioned in the Byzantine imperial Notitia Episcopatuum since emperor Leo VI the Wise (886-912).

Several of its Greek bishops are recorded, but some are disputed :

- Constantinus, signed in 458 a letter by the bishops of Greece to Byzantine emperor Leo I the Thracian after the murder by Coptic mobs of patriarch Proterius of Alexandria.
  - Lequien list before him Anatolius (in 363), but he was probably bishop of Beroea in Syria Prima (now Aleppo).
  - next Lequien inserts, by benefit of doubt, Iohannes Damasceno, whom he also lists as bishop of Euroea (in Phoenicia) alias Evaria, in Phoenicia.
- Teodorus and Teofilattus, successive (?) bishops of Euripus, participated in the 869–70 Church council held at Constantinople. viz. the Council of Constantinople of 879–880, both treating the fate of Patriarch Photios I of Constantinople.

=== Latin crusader bishopric ===
At the establishment of the crusader state Lordship of Negroponte, Chalcis or Negroponte (seat of the central one of its three 'triarchies' constituent baronies) became a Latin Church diocese, the first bishop being Theodorus, the Greek bishop of the see, who entered communion with the see of Rome, installed by papal legate.

On 8 February 1314, the Latin see was united in commendam (as an 'additional benefice') with the Latin Patriarchate of Constantinople, so that the exiled Patriarch, excluded from Constantinople itself since the Byzantine reconquest of the city, could have actual jurisdiction on Greek soil and exercise a direct role as head of the Latin clergy in what remained of Latin Greece.

== Main sights ==
=== Karababa Fortress ===
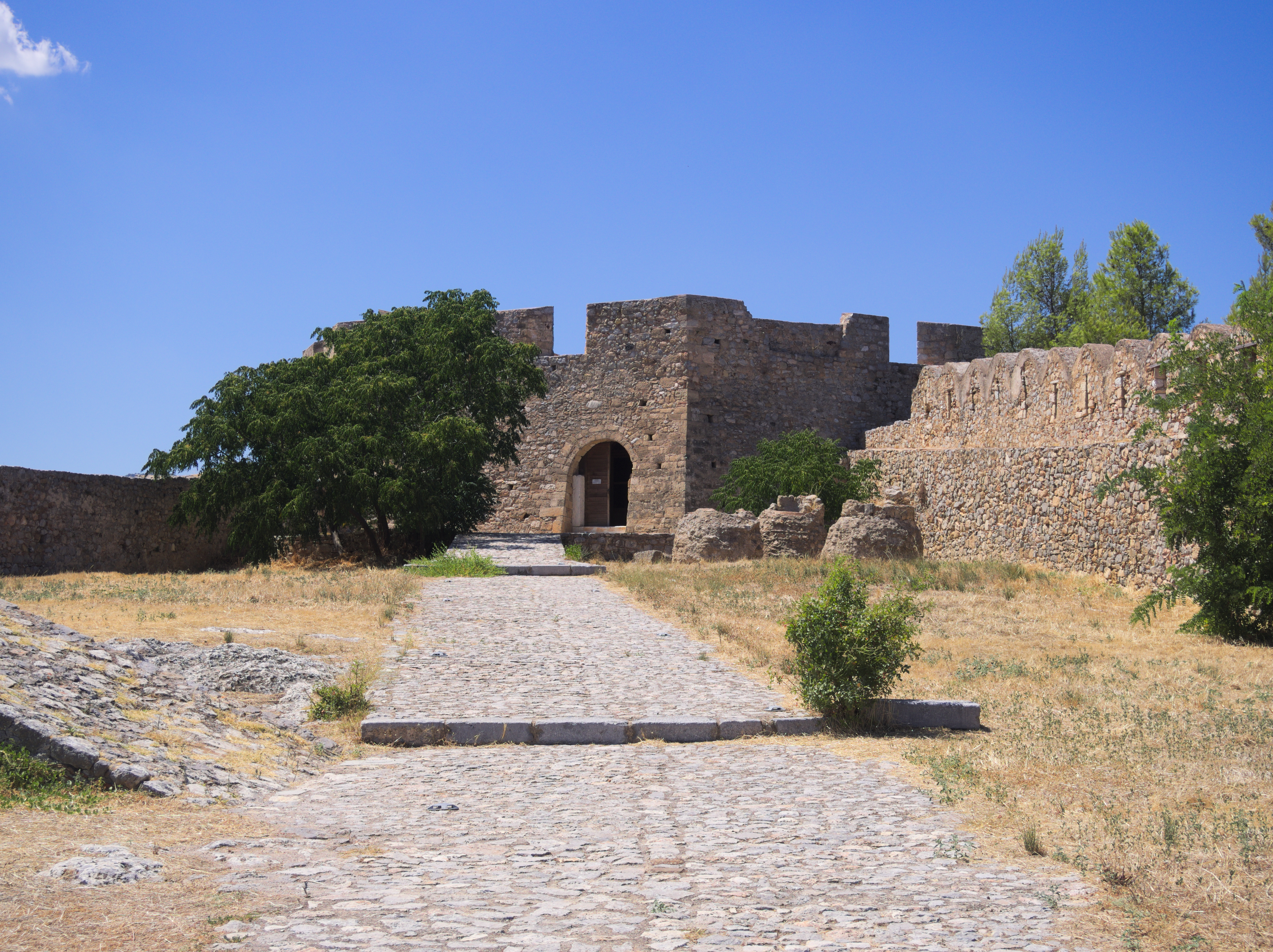
The Karababa Fortress

The Karababa Fortress is a 17th century castle built on the continental coast of the Euripus Strait, opposite to Chalcis, overseeing the city. It was constructed by the Ottoman Empire in 1684, for it to protect the city from the Republic of Venice. The castle was designed by the Venetian architect Gerolimo Galopo and hence its architectural design is more European rather than Ottoman.

=== Church of Saint Paraskevi ===
The church of Saint Paraskevi (the patron saint of the island) was the church of the Dominican Priory of Negroponte, one of the first two houses authorized for the Order of Preachers' Province of Greece in 1249. Started about 1250, this is among the oldest examples of early Dominican architecture surviving, and is one of the only early Dominican churches to retain its original form until the present. The central arch over the iconostasis and the ceiling and walls of the south chapel are the best examples of Italian Gothic stone-carving in Greece. Images of the Dominican saints, Dominic and Peter Martyr, stand at the base of the central arch. The north chapel holds the tomb of the founder of the senatorial Lippamano family of Venice. Some of the column capitals are Byzantine.

=== Emir Zade Mosque ===
The Emir Zade Mosque is an Ottoman-era mosque built in the 15th century, right after the fall of Euboea in the First Ottoman–Venetian War. It is no longer operational and it is classified as a historical monument since 1937.

=== Roman Aqueduct ===
The Roman Aqueduct of Chalcis consists of twelve well preserved arches, with three more columns without arches, as well as eight ruined arches located farther away. It was built by the Romans, with the Venetians and Ottomans making improvements and repairs through the years.

=== The bridges ===
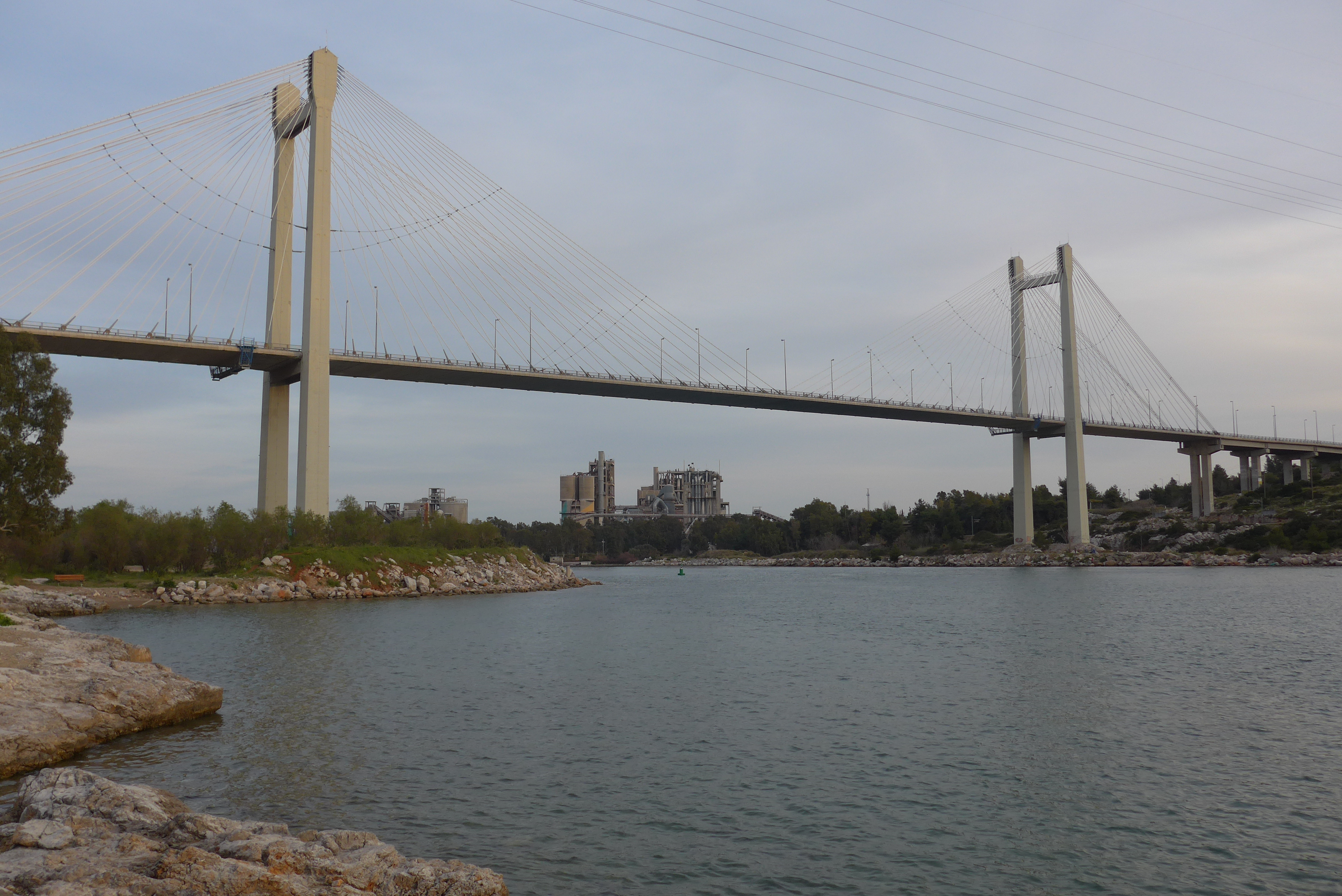
The Chalcis' Bridge connecting the island with the mainland of Greece.

The town is now connected to mainland Greece by two bridges, the "Sliding Bridge" in the west at the narrowest point of the Euripus Strait and a suspension bridge.

The Euripus Strait which separates the city and the island from the mainland was bridged in 411 BC with a wooden bridge. In the time of Justinian the fixed bridge was replaced with a movable structure. The Turks replaced this once again with a fixed bridge. In 1856, a wooden swing bridge was built; in 1896, an iron swing bridge, and in 1962, the existing "sliding bridge"; the construction works of the 19th century destroyed the most part of the medieval castle built across the bridge. The Euripus Bridge or Chalcis Bridge, a cable-stayed suspension bridge opened in 1993, joins Chalcis to the mainland to the south.

A special tidal phenomenon takes place in the strait, as strong tidal currents reverse direction once every six hours, creating strong currents and maelstroms.

=== Museums ===
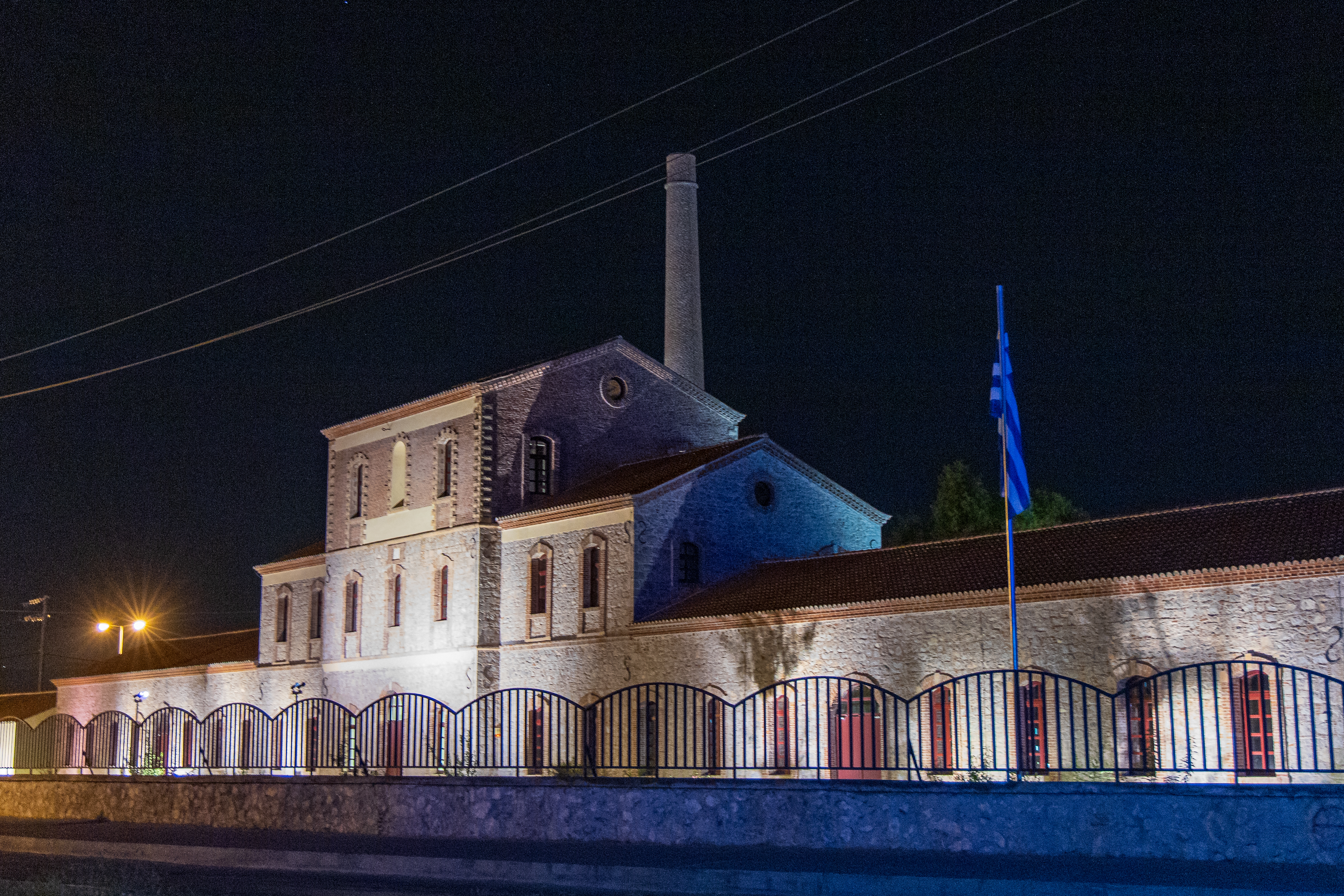
New Archaeological Museum of Chalcis "Arethousa"

- New Archaeological Museum of Chalcis "Arethousa", exhibiting artifacts from the 10th century BCE to the Ottoman period.
- Old Archaeological Museum of Chalcis, exhibiting artifacts from central and northern Euboea, dating from the Neolithic to the Roman period. A number of artifacts have been moved to the new museum.
- War museum of Chalcis, exhibiting artifacts dating from the Venetian Occupation and the Greek War of Independence to modern conflicts.
- Folklore Museum of Chalcis, housed in a 15th century Venetian castle.

== Municipality ==
The municipality Chalcis was formed at the 2011 local government reform by the merger of Chalcis city itself with four former municipalities, which also became municipal units:

- Anthidona
- Avlida
- Lilantia
- Nea Artaki

The municipality has an area of 424.766 km^{2}, the municipal unit 30.804 km^{2}.

== Transportation ==
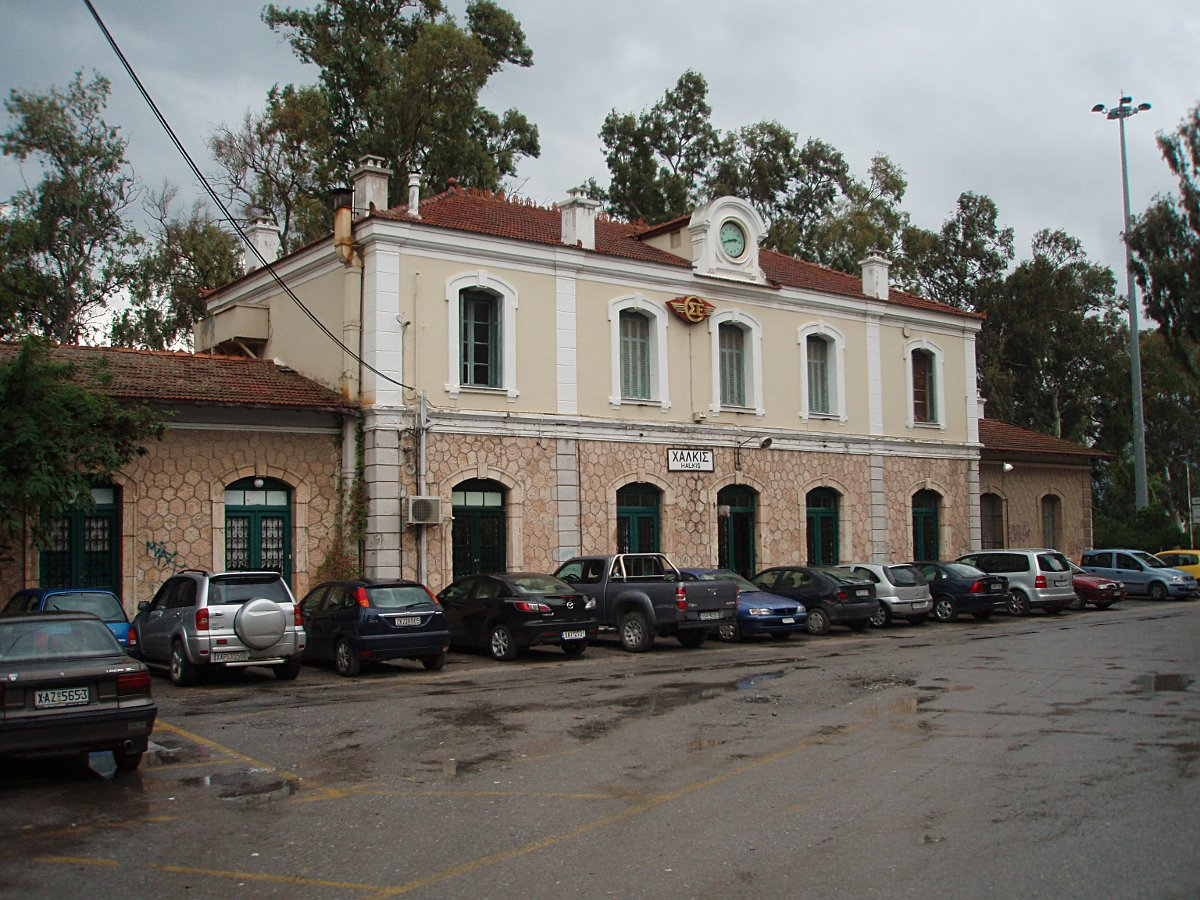
Chalcis railway station

- EO44
- EO77
- A1/E75 is south and west about 10 km (6 mi) from Chalcis in Boeotia.

In 2003, a bypass of Chalcis was opened from the southern part of the bridge to connect with the EO77 road, also with access to the EO44.

Chalcis station is the northern terminus of the Oinoi–Chalcis railway, and is served by Line 3 of the Athens Suburban Railway.

== Historical population ==
Year	Town population	Municipality population
1981	44,847	-
1991	51,646	-
2001	53,584	-
2011	59,125	102,223
2021	64,490	109,256

== Notable residents ==
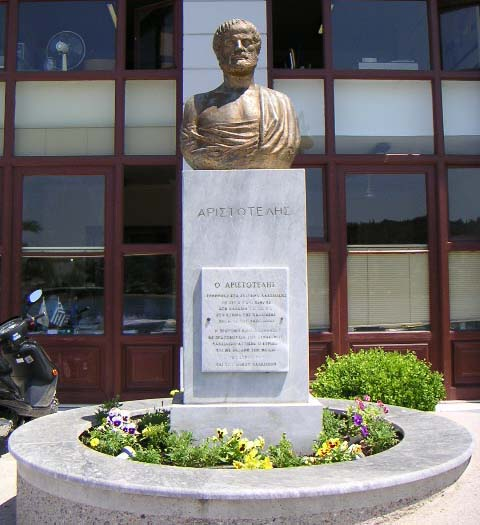
Bust of philosopher Aristotle, from Chalcidice, apoikía of Chalcis.

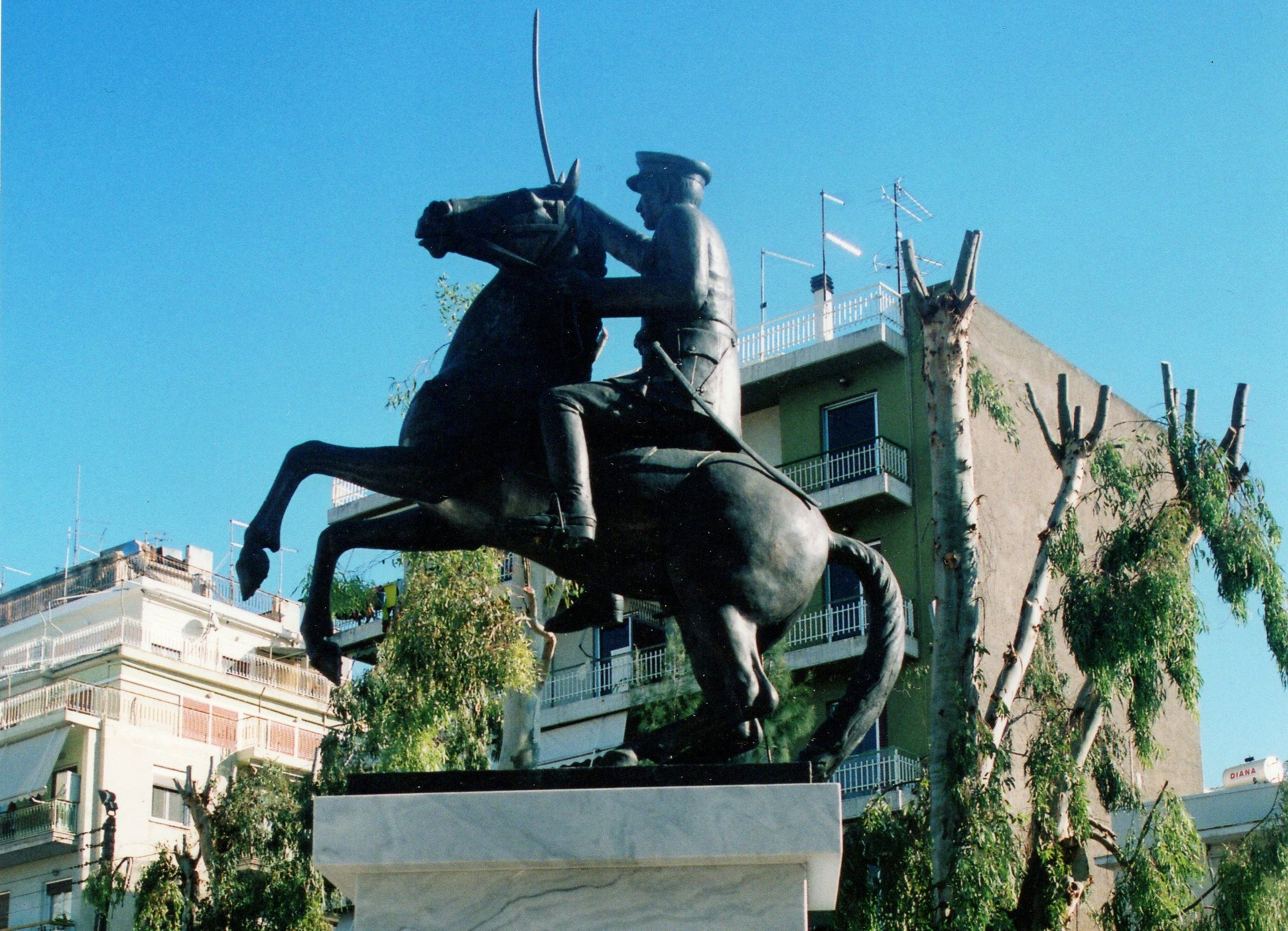
A statue of Mordechai Frizis

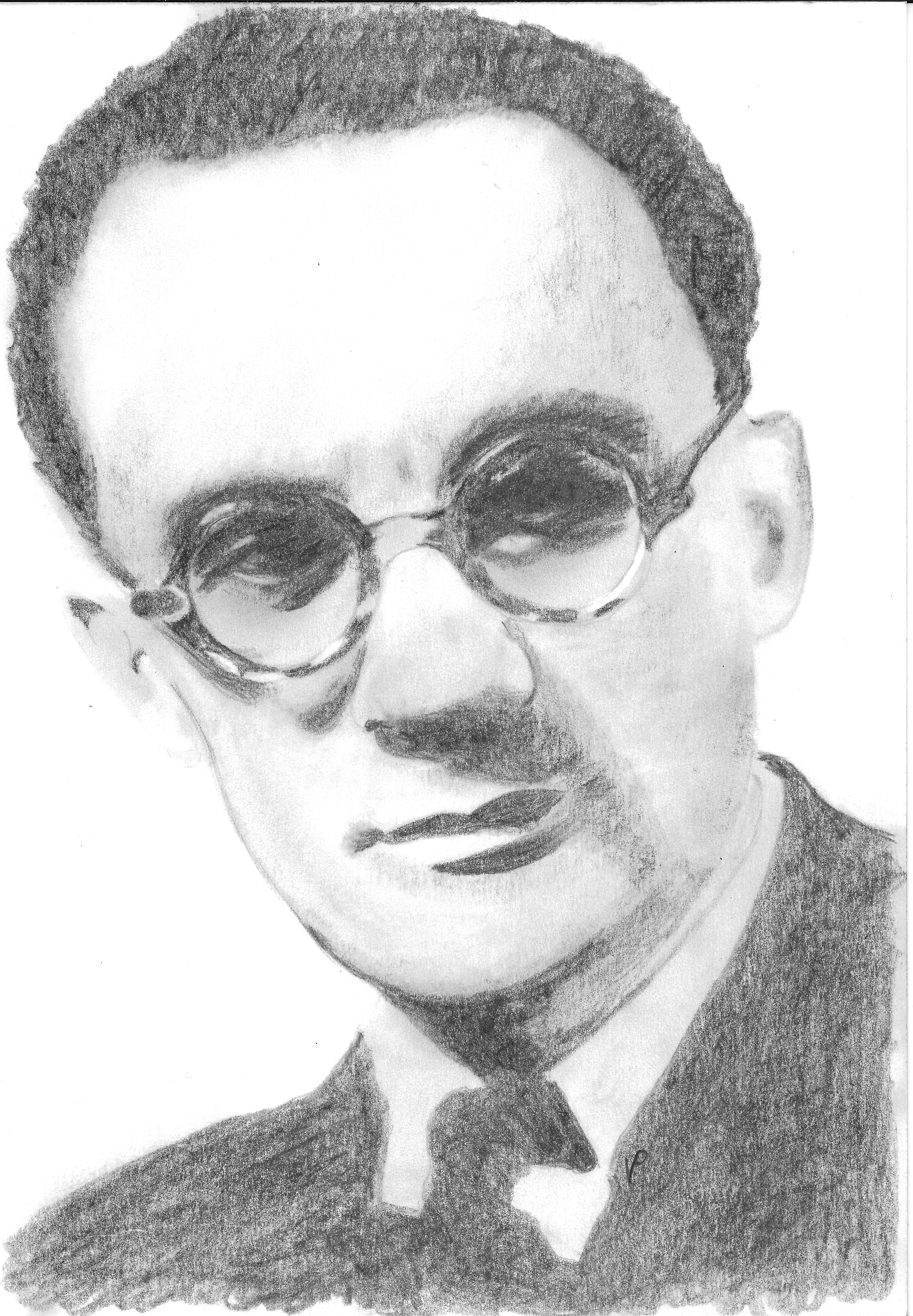
Nikos Skalkottas

- Aristotle (384–322 BC, ancient philosopher, lived in Chalcis the last year of his life (323–322 BC))
- Giovanni Maria Angiolello from Vicenza, Italy, 15th century.
- Yiannis Anastasopoulos (1931–present), author
- Eva Asderaki Professional Tennis Umpire, first woman to umpire the US Open tennis final
- Sotiria Bellou (1921–1997), singer
- Angelos Basinas (1976–present), professional footballer
- Nikolaos Christodoulou, military officer
- Mordehai Frizis (1893–1940), military officer
- Dimitrios Katheniotis, military officer
- Nikolaos Kalogeropoulos, PM of Greece
- Konstantinos Kallias (1901–2004), politician
- Orestis Makris (1898–1975), actor and tenor
- Dimitris Mytaras (1934–2017), painter
- Georgios Papanikolaou (1883–1962), physician, Pap smear test founder
- Nikos Skalkottas (1901–1949), composer
- Giannis Skarimpas (Agia Efthymia, 1893–1984), author
- Telémachos Alexiou, Greek-German filmmaker and visual artist
- Georgios Papachatzis (1905–1991), jurist

== Sports teams ==
Chalcis also has a water polo team named NC Chalkida, a football (soccer) team named Chalkida F.C., as well as a junior football team named Evoikos Chalkida.

The Chalkida football team merged with Lilas Vasilikou for a period of two years (2004–2006). The team was finally dissolved because of financial difficulties. Although there was a team created with the same name (AOX) it does not represent the glorious team of the past.

Chalcis also has a basketball team (AGEX), which previously played in the Greek A2 Basketball League. For a while, Chalcis hosts the basketball team Ikaros Chalkidas that played in the top Greek Basket League.

Sport clubs based in Chalcis
Club	Founded	Sports	Achievements
NO Chalkida	1933	Water Polo	Earlier presence in A1 Ethniki
Chalkida F.C.	1967	Football	Earlier presence in A Ethniki
AGE Chalkida BC	1976	Basketball	Earlier presence in A2 Ethniki

== Twin towns ==
Chalcis is twinned with:

- (China) Wuhan

== Geography ==
=== Climate ===
Chalcis has a mediterranean climate (Köppen climate classification: Csa), closely bordering a semi-arid climate with hot, dry summers and mild, rainy winters.

Climate data for Chalcis
Month	Jan	Feb	Mar	Apr	May	Jun	Jul	Aug	Sep	Oct	Nov	Dec	Year
Mean daily maximum °C (°F)	12.9 (55.2)	13.6 (56.5)	16.0 (60.8)	20.3 (68.5)	25.3 (77.5)	29.8 (85.6)	32.6 (90.7)	32.3 (90.1)	28.9 (84.0)	23.1 (73.6)	18.6 (65.5)	14.7 (58.5)	22.3 (72.1)
Daily mean °C (°F)	9.3 (48.7)	9.8 (49.6)	11.7 (53.1)	15.5 (59.9)	20.2 (68.4)	24.6 (76.3)	27.0 (80.6)	26.6 (79.9)	23.3 (73.9)	18.3 (64.9)	14.4 (57.9)	11.1 (52.0)	17.7 (63.9)
Mean daily minimum °C (°F)	6.5 (43.7)	6.9 (44.4)	8.4 (47.1)	11.6 (52.9)	15.4 (59.7)	20.1 (68.2)	22.5 (72.5)	22.3 (72.1)	19.2 (66.6)	14.9 (58.8)	11.4 (52.5)	8.3 (46.9)	14.0 (57.2)
Average rainfall mm (inches)	44.6 (1.76)	48.3 (1.90)	42.6 (1.68)	28.2 (1.11)	17.2 (0.68)	9.7 (0.38)	4.2 (0.17)	4.6 (0.18)	11.9 (0.47)	47.7 (1.88)	50.6 (1.99)	66.6 (2.62)	376.2 (14.82)
Average relative humidity (%)	72	71	68	62	58	52	48	49	56	66	73	73	62
Mean monthly sunshine hours	137.9	144.5	187.5	238.9	303.3	341.2	373.7	356.5	283.4	218.5	164.3	136.4	2,886.1
Source 1: www.yr.no
Source 2: www.weather.gr

== See also ==
- List of Catholic dioceses in Greece
- Licodia Eubea, Catania, Sicily Italy - The name Eubea was given to the place in 1872, to identify with Chalcis, because it is believed to be the colony of Leontini.

== Sources and external links ==
- "Eubœia" , Encyclopædia Britannica, vol. 8 (9th ed.), 1878, pp. 647–649
- GCatholic - (former and titular) Latin see
- Photos from Chalcis, Evoia
- Herodotus Project: B+W photo essay of ancient Chalcis

Bibliography - ecclesiastical history

- Pius Bonifacius Gams, Series episcoporum Ecclesiae Catholicae, Leipzig 1931, pp. 430–431
- Michel Lequien, Oriens christianus in quatuor Patriarchatus digestus, Paris 1740, Vol. II, coll. 212-215
- Gaetano Moroni, Dizionario di erudizione storico-ecclesiastica, vol. 47, pp. 262–263
- Konrad Eubel, Hierarchia Catholica Medii Aevi, vol. 1, p. 367; vol. 2, p. 203; vol. 3, p. 259
- Raymond Janin, v. 2. 'Chalcis', in Dictionnaire d'Histoire et de Géographie ecclésiastiques, vol. XII, Paris 1953, coll. 278-279
