= Telémachos Alexiou =

Greek filmmaker

Telémachos Alexiou is a Greek-German filmmaker and visual artist.

== Early life ==
Telémachos Alexiou was born in Chalkida, Evvoia, Greece. He is the son of Pavlina Alexiou, a local real estate agent, and Konstantinos Alexiou, a math professor. As a child he trained as a ballroom dancer. By the age of sixteen he had won all ballroom dance national titles.

At the age of seventeen Alexiou moved to London, UK, to study Communications & Visual Culture and later to Berlin, Germany, where he studied film theory and started working as a filmmaker and artist.

== Career ==
In 2009, Alexiou directed his first medium-length experimental film, The Logic Of The Cat, which had a cinema release only two years later.

In 2010, he attracted international attention with his experimental video The Dream Of Norma, starring Vaginal Davis, which premiered at the Berlin International Film Festival.

After The Dream Of Norma, Alexiou directed multiple short and medium-length films and video works, including the film Venus In The Garden, which have been presented in various film festivals and art spaces around the world such as Temporäre Kunsthalle Berlin and LA Outfest.

In 2011, the Arsenal Institute for Film and Video Art in Berlin, Germany, dedicated a mini-retrospective to his films and started archiving his work.

In 2014, Telémachos Alexiou finished his first feature film, Queen Antigone (Vasilissa Antigoni), a reconfiguration of the ancient tragedy Antigone by Sophocles. The film was produced by the legendary Berlin film producer Jürgen Brüning. It premiered at the Mumbai Film Festival in October of the same year and had its European premiere at the Thessaloniki International Film Festival a month later.

== Personal life ==
Alexiou is gay and describes his films as partly autobiographical.

== Languages ==
Telémachos Alexiou is also a polyglot. He currently speaks nine languages fluently and understands a dozen more.

== Filmography ==
Title	Year
The Logic Of The Cat	2009
The Dream Of Norma	2010
Deux	2010
An Interview With An Artist	2011
Venus In The Garden	2011
Natural Bodily Practices	2013
Simón De La Columna	2014
Salomé's Dance	2014
Queen Antigone	2014
The Erection Of Lazarus	2015 (in post-production)
Scena Finale	2015 (in post-production)
