= Telemaco (Sor) =

1797 opera by Fernando Sor

Il Telemaco nell'isola di Calipso
- Opera by Fernando Sor
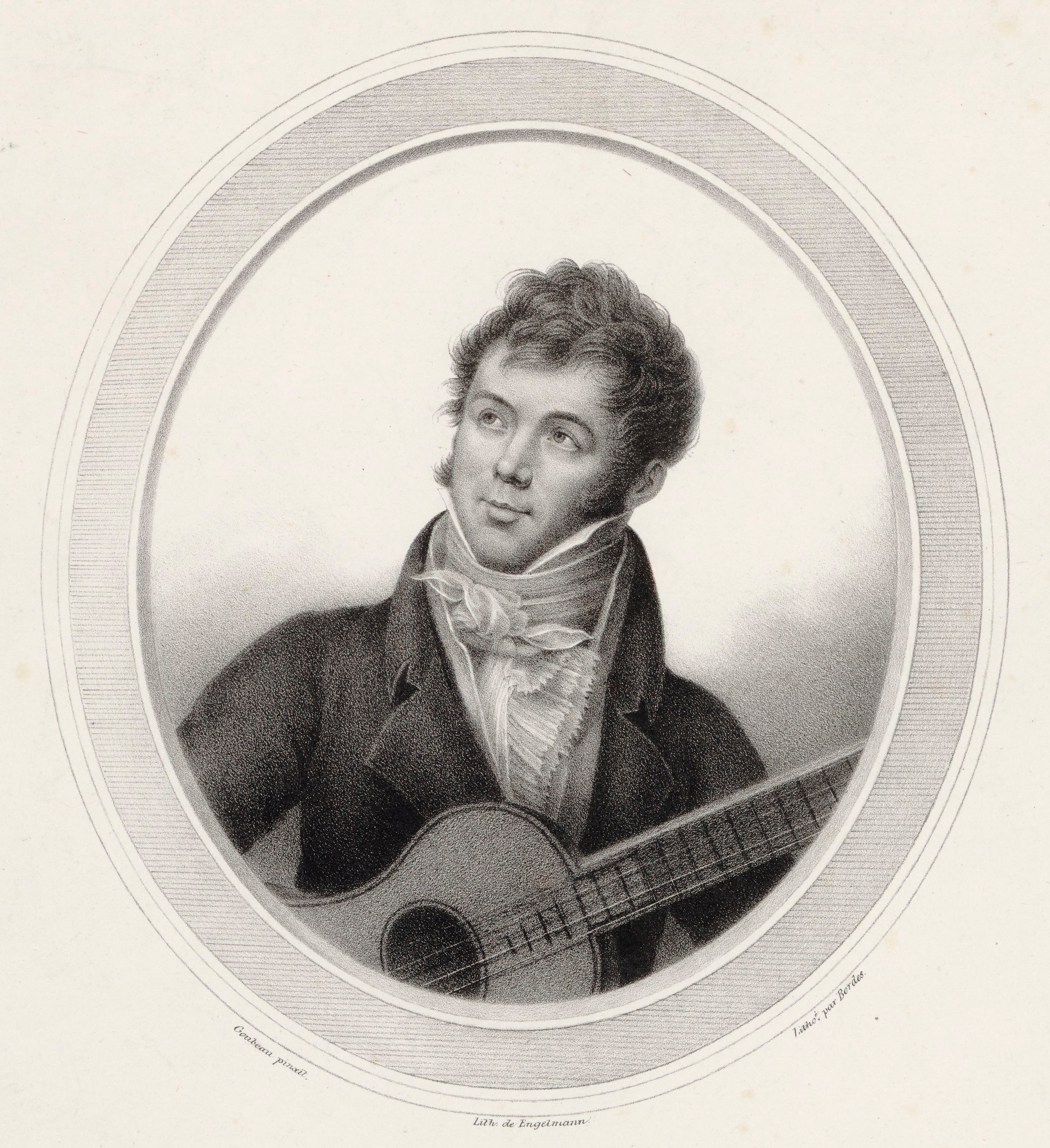
- The composer
- Translation: Telemachus on Calypso's Island
- Librettist: Carlo Sigismondo Capece
- Language: Italian
- Premiere: 25 August 1797; Teatro de la San Cruz, Barcelona

Il Telemaco nell'isola di Calipso (Telemachus on Calypso's Island) is an opera by composer Fernando Sor. The libretto was by Carlo Sigismondo Capece. It was first produced in Barcelona at the Teatro de la San Cruz on 25 August 1797. It was revived in the same city on 18 May 1798.

The work was thought lost for many years until a score was found in the early 1990s. A 1999 production of the opera was mounted at the Teatre Principal of Vilanova i la Geltrú by the Symphonic Orchestra of Garraf under conductor Joan Lluís Moraleda i Perxachs. The presentation was recorded on the Moleda label and was released on CD in 2000.

Other operas with the same title were written by Giovanni Vincenzo Meucci (1773), Charles Lepicq (1776), João Cordeiro de Silva (1787), Countess Maria Theresia Ahlefeldt (1792), and Simon Mayr (1797).

== Roles ==
| Role | Voice type | Premiere Cast, 25 August 1797 (Conductor:) |
|---|---|---|
| Calipso | soprano | |
| Eucaris | soprano | |
| Telemaco | tenor | |
| The mentor | baritone | |

== Recording ==
Sor: Il Telemaco nell'isola di Calipso - Cambra del Garraf Orchestra, Conductor: Joan Lluís Moraleda, Principal singers: Yolanda Auyanet, Matreu, Joan Cabero, Odena, Recording date: 2003 Label: Edicions Albert Moral (CD)

== Sources ==
- Casaglia, Gherardo (2005)."Telemaco nell'isola di Calipso". L'Almanacco di Gherardo Casaglia (in Italian).
- Brian Jeffery: "Fernando Sor", Grove Music Online ed. L. Macy (Accessed September 17, 2008), (subscription access)
- Zazzerino page on the 2003 recording
