= Papagos =

Papagos may refer to:

- Alexandros Papagos, Greek field marshal during World War II and Greek prime minister
- Papagou, Athens, Greece, suburb named after Alexandros Papagos
- Tohono O'odham, Native American group formerly known as the Papago
