= Varkiza =

Suburb of Athens, Greece

Varkiza Βάρκιζα
- Settlement
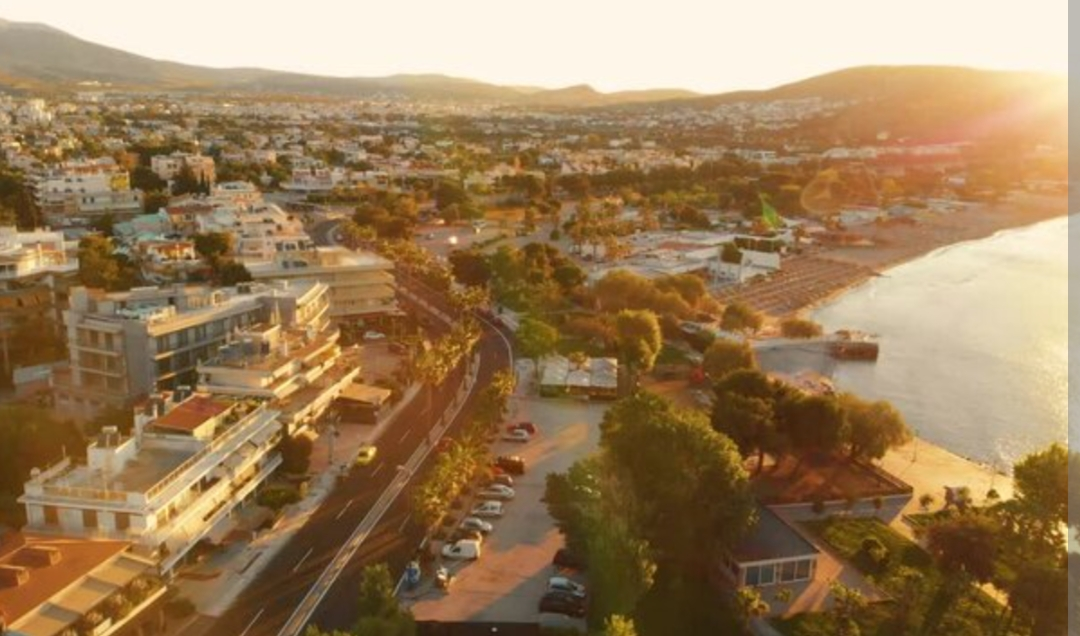

- Location within Greece
- Coordinates: 37°49′N 23°48′E
- Country: Greece
- Administrative region: Attica
- Regional unit: East Attica
- Municipality: Vari-Voula-Vouliagmeni
- Municipal unit: Vari
- Elevation: 5 m (16 ft)
- Time zone: UTC+2 (EET)
  - Summer (DST): UTC+3 (EEST)
- Postal code: 166 72
- Area code: 210
- Vehicle registration: Z

Varkiza (Greek: Βάρκιζα), also formerly Alianthos (Αλίανθος), is a town and a suburb of greater Athens forming part of the municipality of Vari-Voula-Vouliagmeni in southern Attica of the Megalo Daktylo (Large Finger). Varkiza, according to the poet Valaoras, took its name from the Mitromagazo of Varkiza, part of the Regional Unit of Southeast Attica. It lies approximately 2 km south of Vari, 22 km S of Athens city centre, SW of the Eleftherios Venizelos International Airport and the Attiki Odos (numbers 6 and 62), NW of Cape Sounio, and south of the Hymettus Ring. The locality is linked with Poseidonos Avenue (part of the EO91 road), just east of Vouliagmeni.

The Hymettus mountains lie to the northwest and the Mesogeian plain to the north. Another mountain lies toward the northeast. Most of the area's streets take names from Greek mythology, and its main street, Poseidonos, forms a connection with the route running from Neo Faliro down toward the Glyfada boundary. Forests cover partpart of the municipality, but much of the mountainous area is rocky and grassy. Varkiza has a widely known beach, which has tennis courts, parkland and fields, restaurants, taverns, complexes and other amenities. The urban sprawl sporadically covers the farmlands and moves west of Varkiza.

The population were rural until the 1960s while suburban housing sprang up between the 1960s and the 1990s, making most of the population urban and expanding to this day. Housing development began in the central part of district where farmland once used to dominate its central areas and within the Saronic Gulf. Later, Varkiza became part of the Athens urban area, and in the 1960s, the connecting highway had two lanes added.

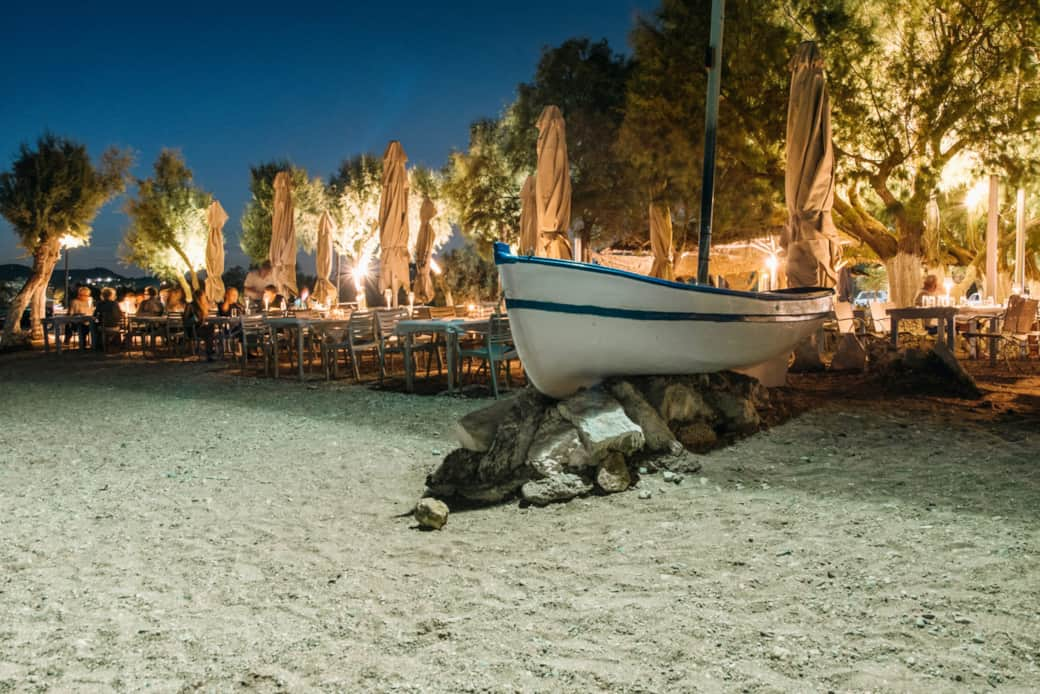

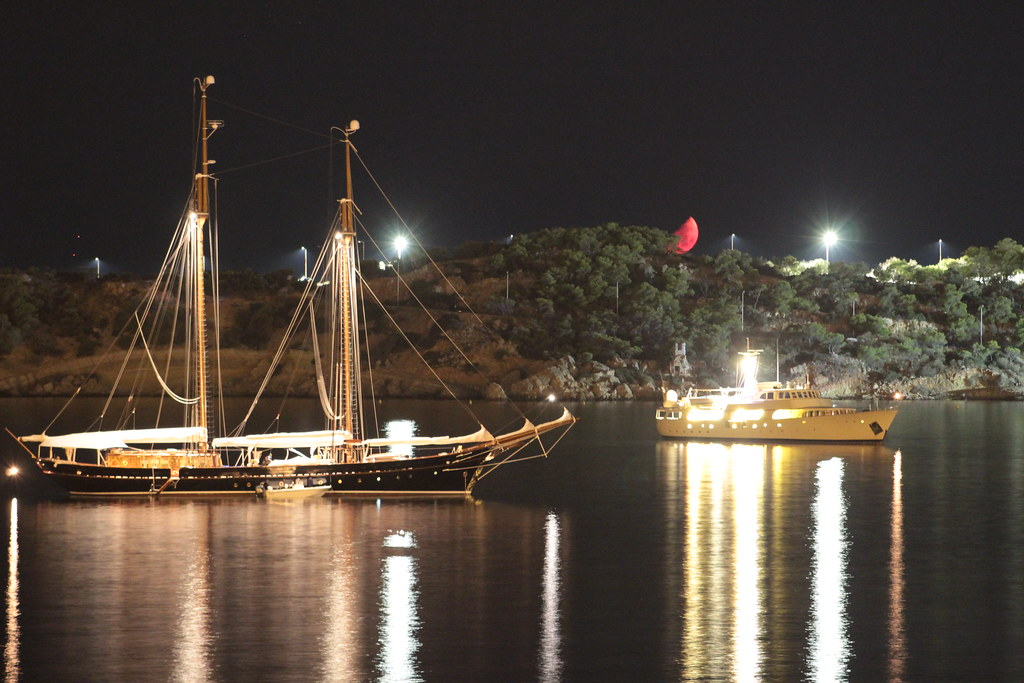

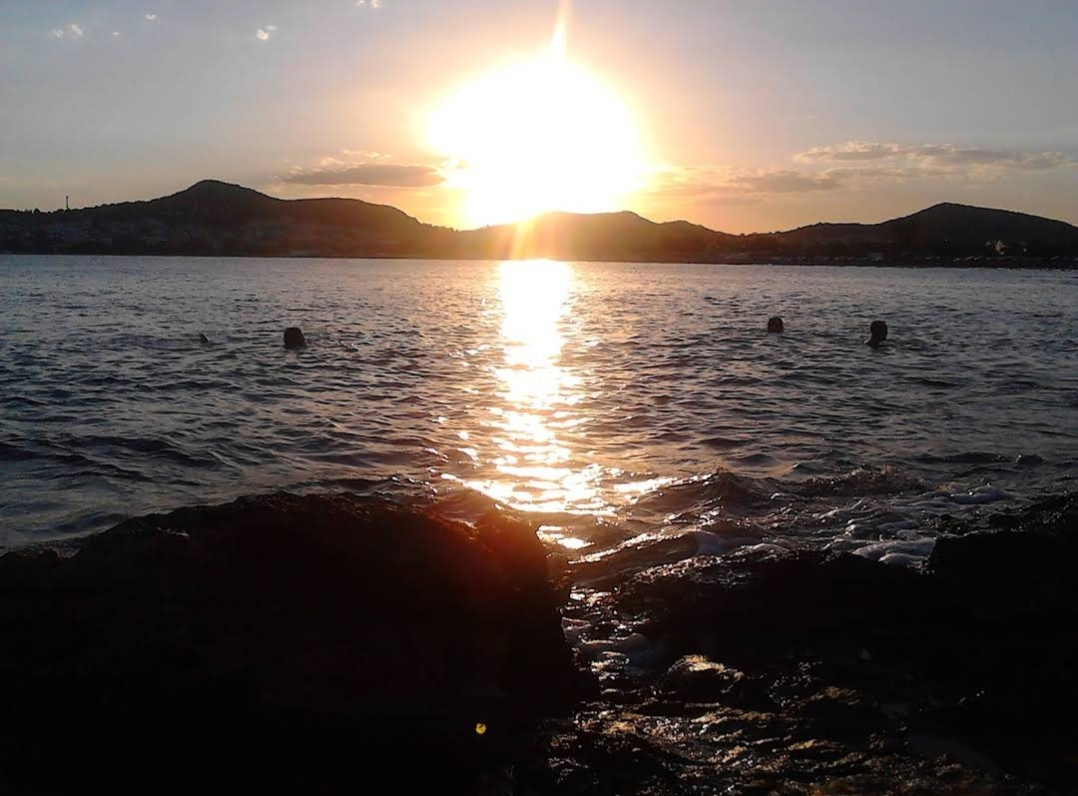

== History ==
The Treaty of Varkiza was signed in 1945 in an attempt to end the Greek Civil War. It was signed at the Kanelopoulos Mansion, which is located at Vari.

== Other ==
Varkiza has one school (dimotiko), banks, a church, restaurants, bars, taverns, a post office and a couple of squares (plateies).

Since 2001 Varkiza has been hugely modernised. Varkiza just after the World War II was a small village for fishermen but today has developed to a small town for the rich with one of the best beaches in Attiki. In the summer the population triples as Varkiza resort is right next to the top summer clubs which are located on the "Glyfada strip".

== See also ==
- List of communities of Attica
