= Vari =

Suburb of Athens, Greece

Vari Βάρη
- Municipal unit
- Location within the regional unit

- Location within Greece
- Coordinates: 37°50′N 23°48′E
- Country: Greece
- Administrative region: Attica
- Regional unit: East Attica
- Municipality: Vari-Voula-Vouliagmeni

Area
  - Municipal unit: 22.633 km^{2} (8.739 sq mi)
- Elevation: 25 m (82 ft)

Population (2021)
  - Municipal unit: 16,717
  - Municipal unit density: 738.61/km^{2} (1,913.0/sq mi)
- Time zone: UTC+2 (EET)
  - Summer (DST): UTC+3 (EEST)
- Postal code: 166 xx
- Area code: 210
- Vehicle registration: Z

Vari (Greek: Βάρη) is a southern suburb of Athens and a former municipality in East Attica, Greece, along the Athens coast. The ancient Athenian deme of Anagyrous was situated here.

Since the 2011 local government reform it is part of the municipality Vari-Voula-Vouliagmeni, of which it is a municipal unit. The municipal unit has an area of 22.633 km^{2}.

== Geography ==
It lies at the southwestern end of the Mesogeia plain and the southeast shoulder of the Hymettus mountain, near the Saronic Gulf coast. Greek National Road 91 connects Vari with Athens city centre and Sounio. Vari's beach is located in an area called Varkiza, a fishing village that joined the municipality of Vari, in 1997. This particular beach has won the blue flag many years in the past, including 2009.

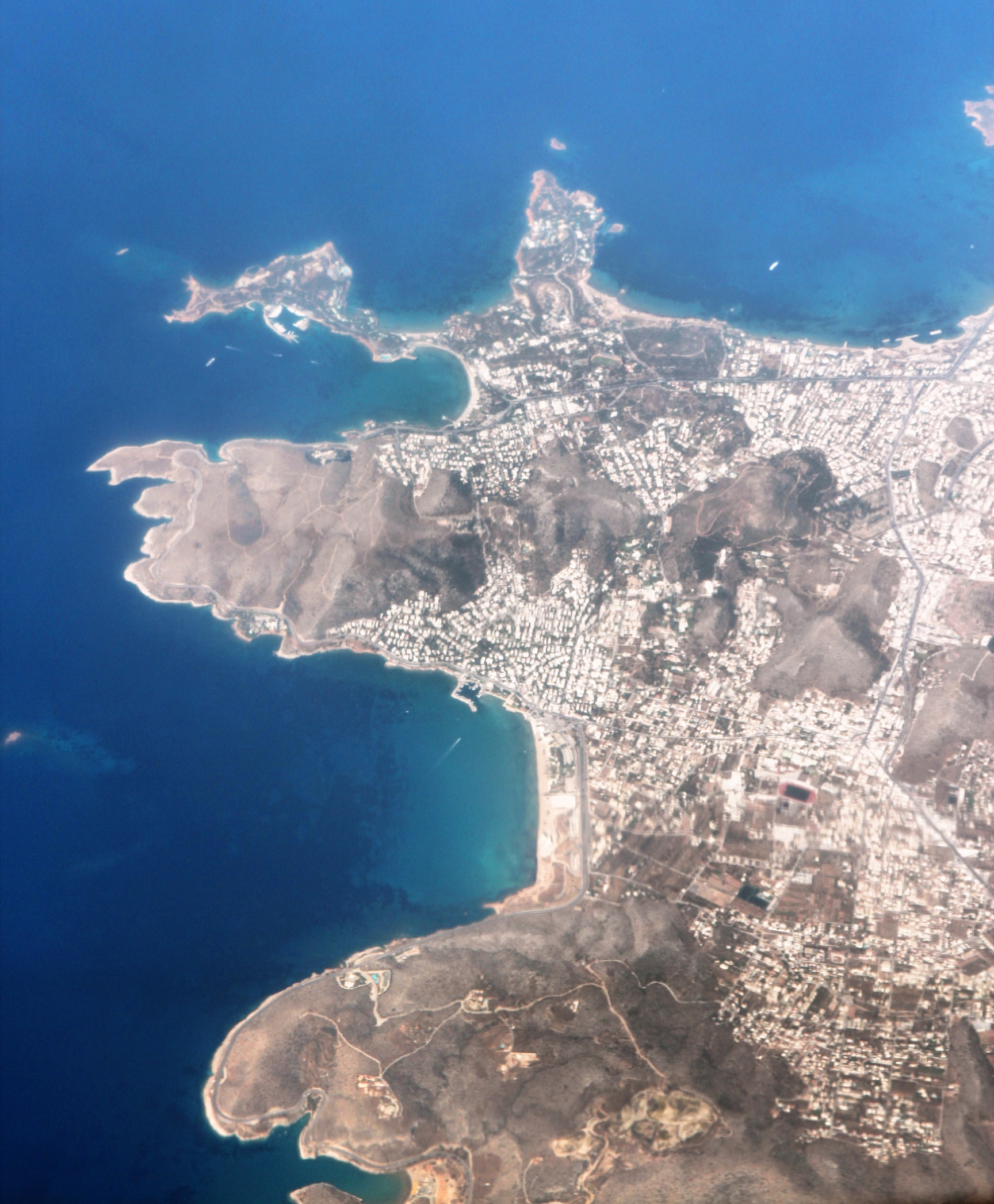
Aerial photo of Vari

After 1 January 2011 Vari joined Voula and Vouliagmeni, according to Kallikratis regulations, in a joined municipality. Grigoris Konstantellos is the incumbent mayor, elected for a second term at May 26, 2019, for the unified municipality of Vari-Voula-Vouliagmeni.

== Archaeology ==
A 2,000-year-old marble engraving found near Vari might indicate an Archaic temple on the Acropolis of Athens. It is possible that sheep and goat herders carved the engraving in the 6th century BC. It depicts a temple facade with at least five columns and includes an inscription in Old Attic alphabet referring to the "Hekatompedon" by someone named Mikon. The term ἑκατόμπεδος, meaning "of a hundred feet", has been used in sacred contexts, and the Acropolis is the most likely location due to its association with the term. The engraving could refer to the Bluebeard Temple or the Gigantomachy Temple, both on the Acropolis.

== Historical population ==
Year	Population
1981	4,211
1991	8,488
2001	10,998
2011	15,855
2021	16,717

== See also ==
- List of municipalities of Attica
