= Papagou-Cholargos =

Papagou-Cholargos Παπάγου-Χολαργός
- Municipality
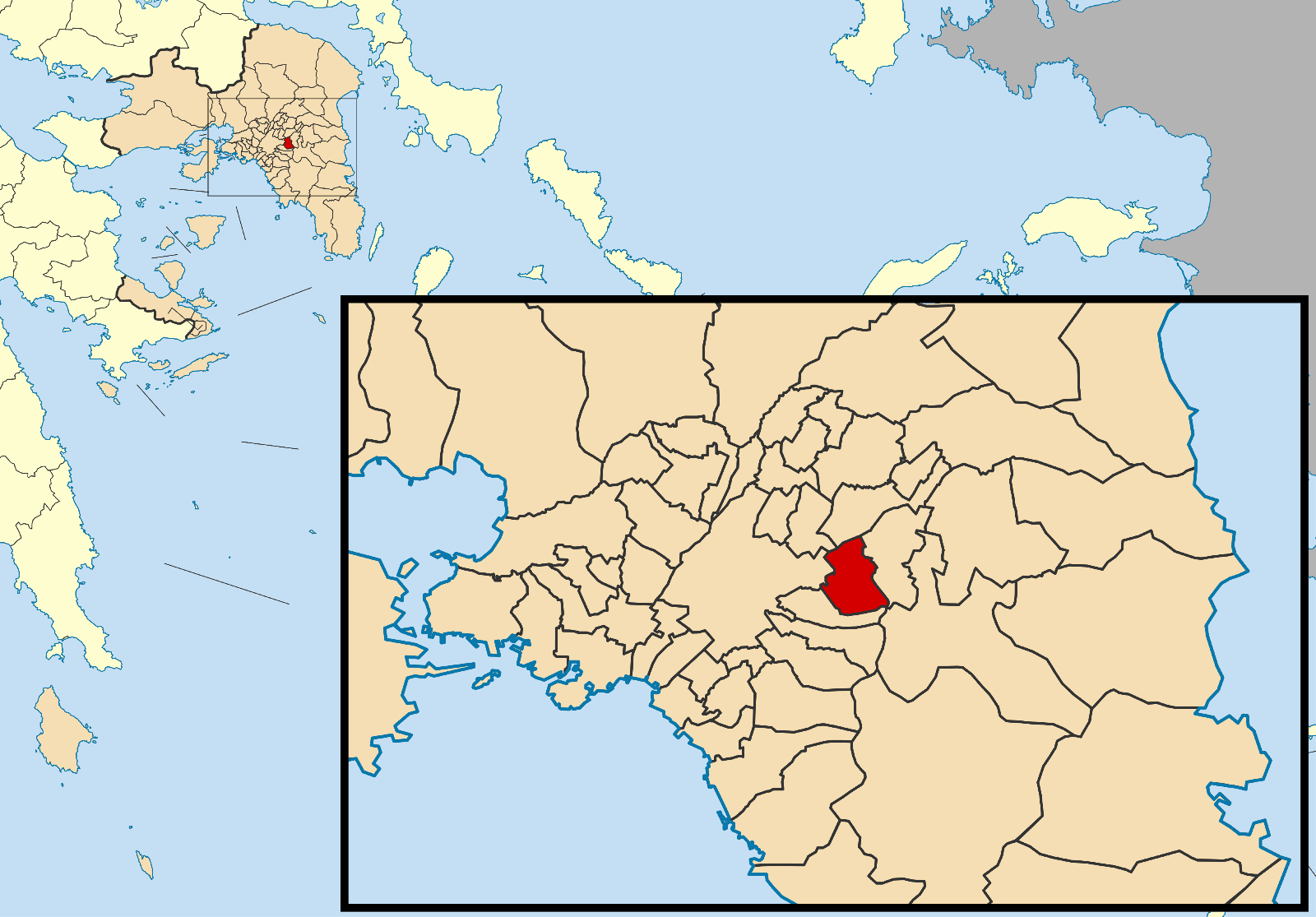

- Location within Greece
- Coordinates: 38°01′N 23°46′E
- Country: Greece
- Administrative region: Attica
- Regional unit: North Athens

Government
  - Mayor: Ilias Apostolopoulos (since 2014)

Area
  - Municipality: 7.325 km^{2} (2.828 sq mi)

Population (2021)
  - Municipality: 45,266
  - Density: 6,180/km^{2} (16,010/sq mi)
- Time zone: UTC+2 (EET)
  - Summer (DST): UTC+3 (EEST)
- Website: www.dpapxol.gov.gr

Papagou-Cholargos (Greek: Παπάγου-Χολαργός) is a municipality in the North Athens regional unit, Attica, Greece. The seat of the municipality is the town Cholargos.

== Municipality ==
The municipality Papagou-Cholargos was formed at the 2011 local government reform by the merger of the following 2 former municipalities, that became municipal units:

- Cholargos
- Papagou

The municipality has an area of 7.325 km^{2}.
