= Hymettus =

Mountain range in Attica, Greece

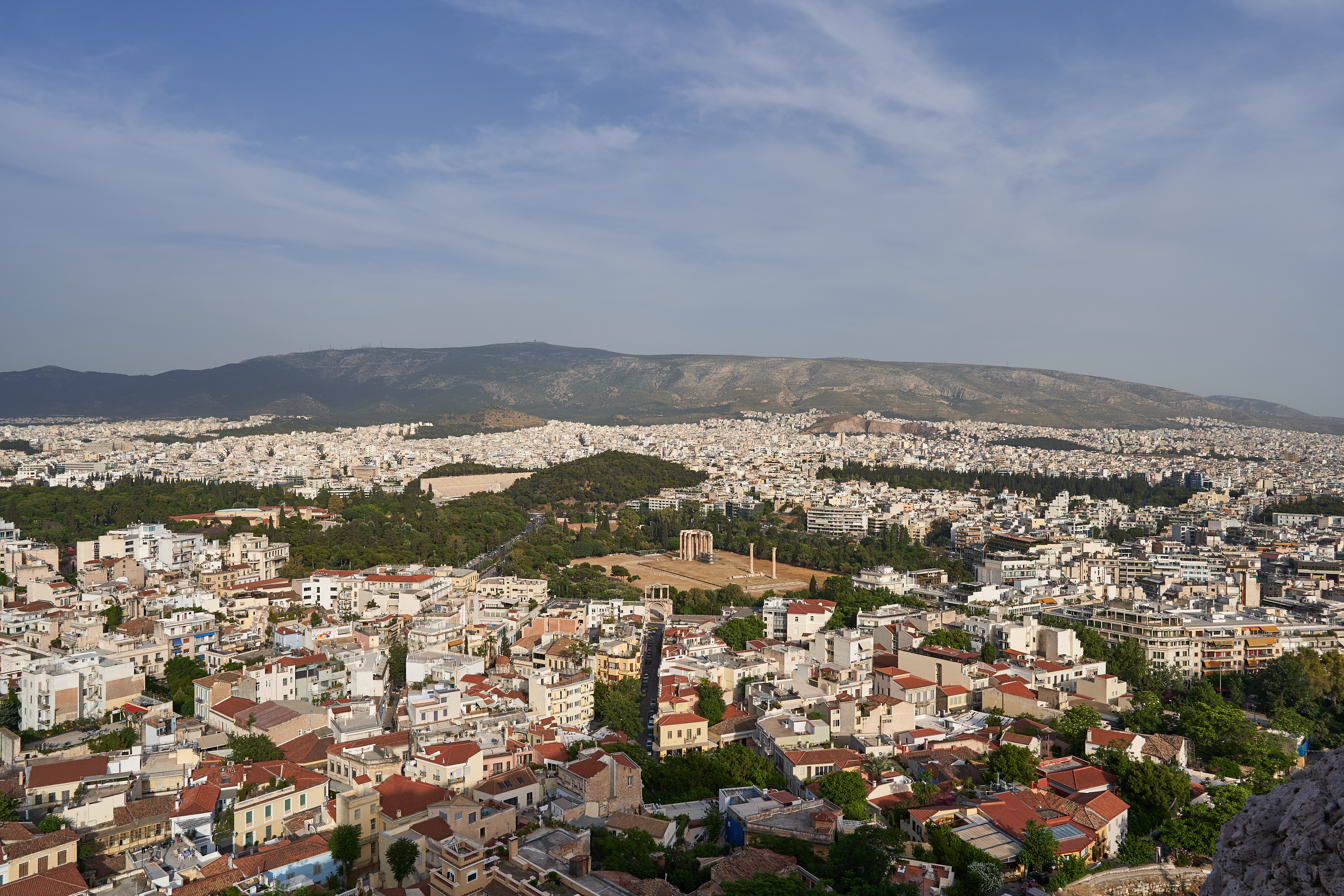
- View of Hymettus from Acropolis. In the central middle-distance is the Temple of Olympian Zeus.

Highest point
- Elevation: 1,026 m (3,366 ft)
- Coordinates: 37.963°N 23.81667°E

Geography
- Location: East-central Attica about 15 km E of central Athens
- Parent range: Hymettus

Climbing
- Easiest route: climb, road

Hymettus (/haɪˈmɛtəs/), also Hymettos (/haɪˈmɛtɒs/; Greek: Υμηττός, romanized: Ymittós pronounced [imiˈtos]; Ancient Greek: Ὑμηττός [hymɛːt.tós]), is a mountain range in the Athens area of Attica, East Central Greece. It is also colloquially known as Trellós (crazy) or Trellóvouno (crazy mountain); the latter in awe of its winding length of 16 km. Hymettus was assigned the status of a protected area in the EU's Natura 2000 ecological network.

== Geography ==
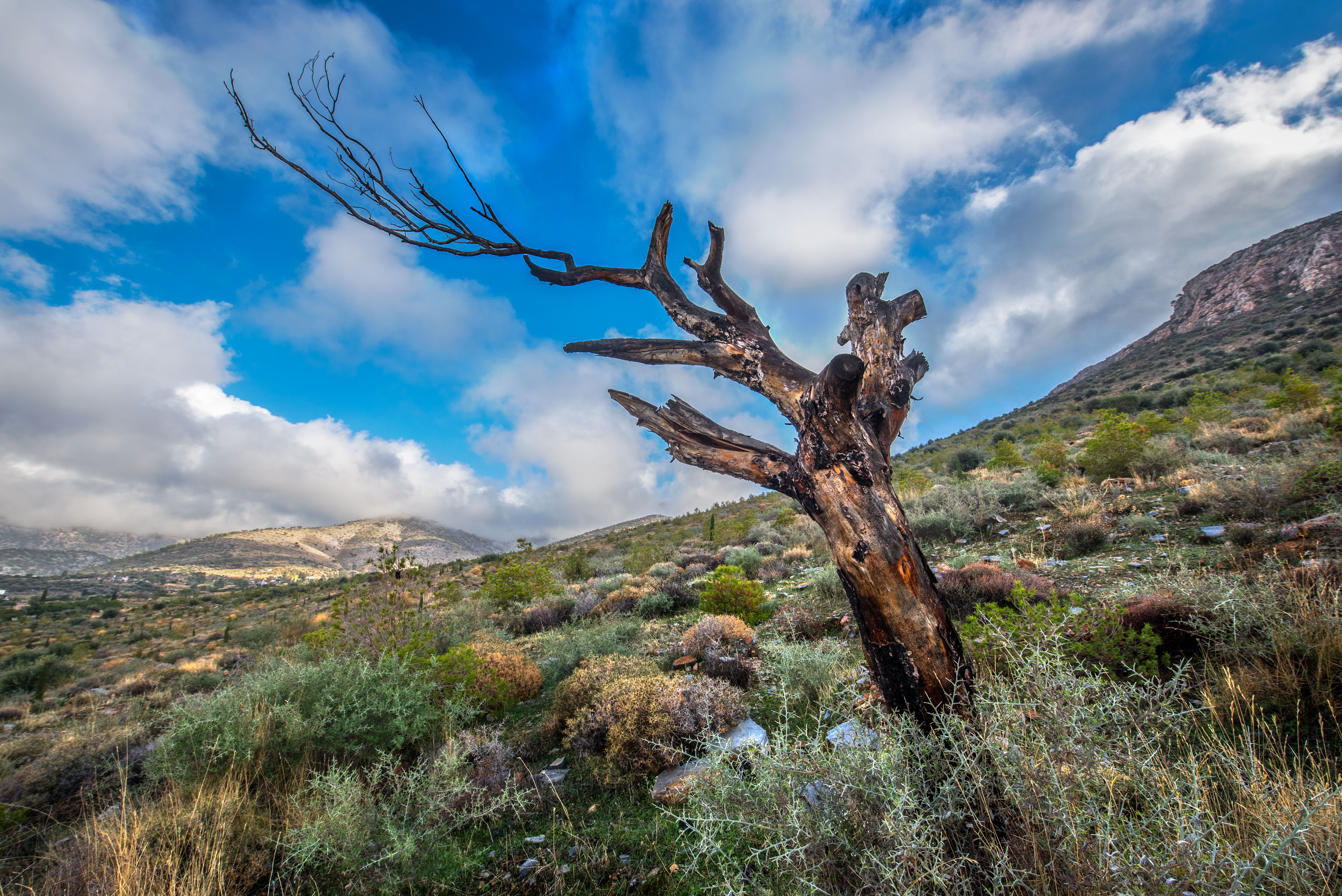
Landscape at Hymettus

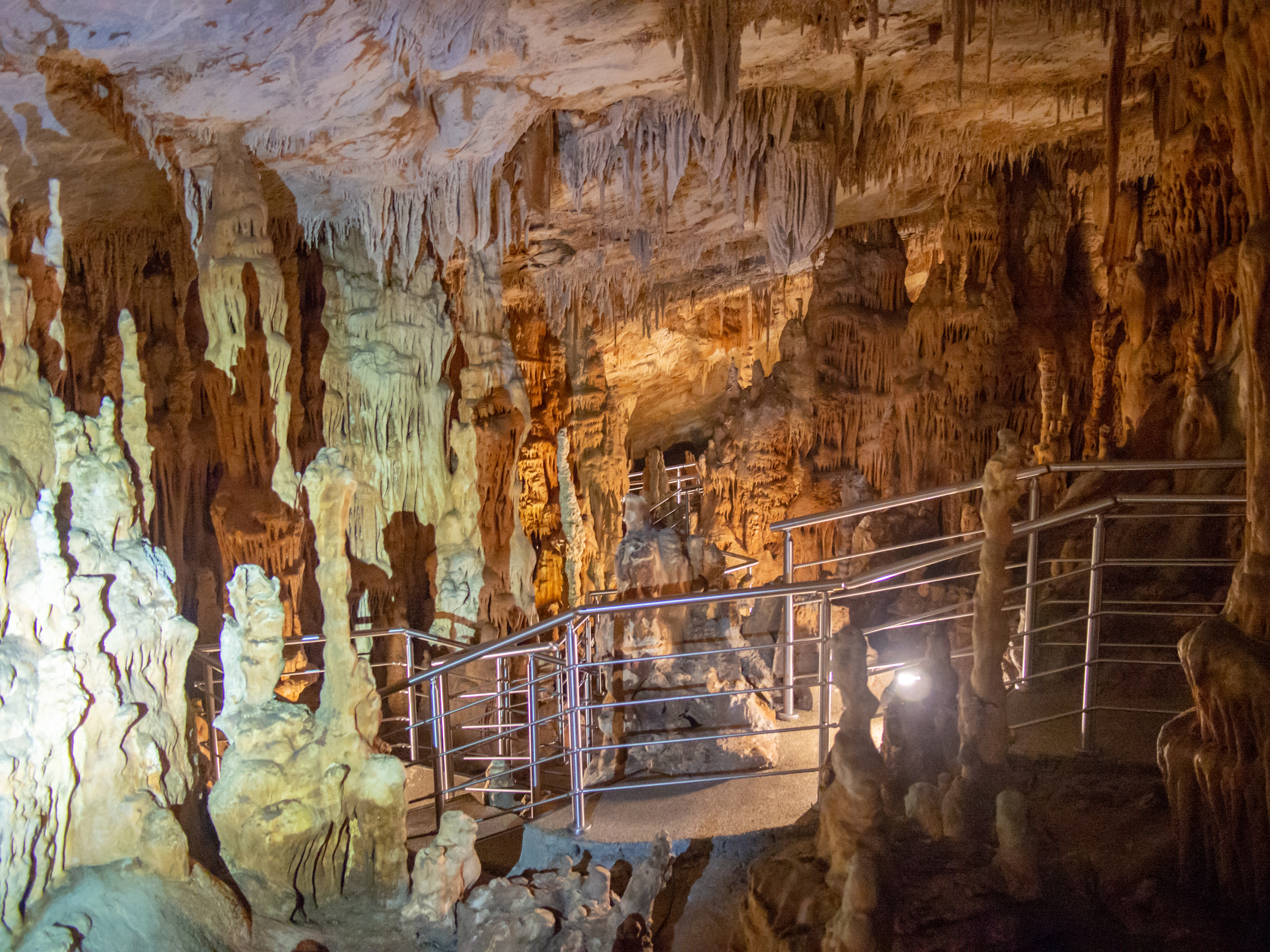
Koutouki cave

The highest point of the mountain range is Evzonas (Εύζωνας) with an elevation of 1,026 m (3,366 ft). The 16 km (9.9 mi) length of Hymettus stretches from Athens to the Saronic Gulf. It is 6 to 7 km from east to west. In ancient times, the highest point was known as Megas Hymettos and the southern peaks as Elasson (Ἐλάσσων "lesser, smaller") and Anydros Hymettos (Ἄνυδρος Ὑμηττός, "waterless Hymettos"). Today the southern peaks are called Mavrovouni (Μαυροβούνι, "black mountain") and Kontra (Κόντρα). It was noted for its thyme honey. Marble has been quarried since antiquity. The neighboring communities that surround the mountain are Athens (proper), Zografou, Kaisariani, Vyronas, Ilissia (a region of Zografou), Ymittos, Ilioupoli, Argyroupoli, Elliniko, Glyfada, Voula and Vouliagmeni in the west, Varkiza, Vari, Markopoulo and Paiania to its east, and Papagou, Cholargos, Agia Paraskevi, Gerakas and Glyka Nera. Most of the forest is in the north, and much of the mountain is rocky, deforested, grassy and made out of limestone.

The flanks of Hymettos are dotted with caves. The largest and most notable is Koutouki cave, which has its entrance on the east flank of the mountain, near Paiania. The smaller Liontari cave has its mouth at the north end of the mountain, west of Glyka Nera and is named after the lion of Hymettos which is said to have lived on the mountain in the past and to have terrified the inhabitants of the surrounding area.

== Archaeology and monuments ==
In antiquity there was a sanctuary to Zeus Ombrios ("Zeus rain bringer") on the summit with numerous offerings dating especially to the 8th-7th centuries BC; they are on the site of a military base and not currently accessible. There is also an ancient quarryman's hut on the western slopes of the mountain, one of two buildings in ancient Attica which preserves its roof.

A small geometric and classical site was discovered on the mountain in 1921 by J. M. Prindle of Harvard University; (Note: Blegen, Carl W. (1922-04-05), Report on Excavations at Zygouries, Hagiorgitika and Hymettus (PDF), Athens, p. 4 – via American School of Classical Studies at Athens (for the details of the discovery); Lord, Louis E. (1947). A History of the American School of Classical Studies at Athens 1882–1942 (PDF). Cambridge: Harvard University Press. p. 148. OCLC 648555.; Hood, Rachel (1998). Faces of Archaeology in Greece: Caricatures by Piet de Jong. Oxford: Leopard's Head. p. 174. ISBN 0-904920-38-0. (for the details of the site).) Carl Blegen, then assistant director of the American School of Classical Studies at Athens, made an exploratory excavation there in 1923. T. Leslie Shear excavated the site in 1924, meeting the project's expenses from his own money.

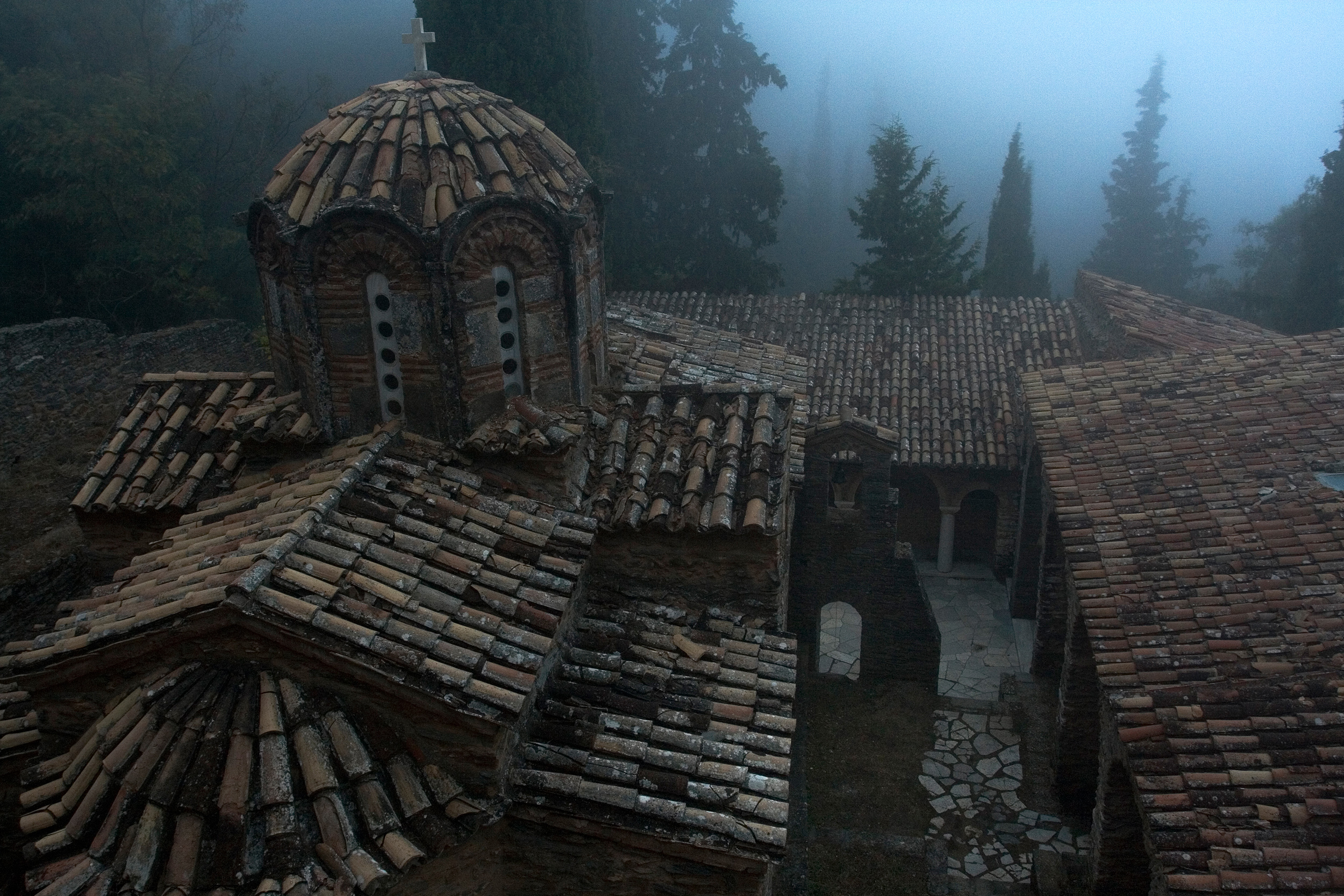
Asteriou Monastery

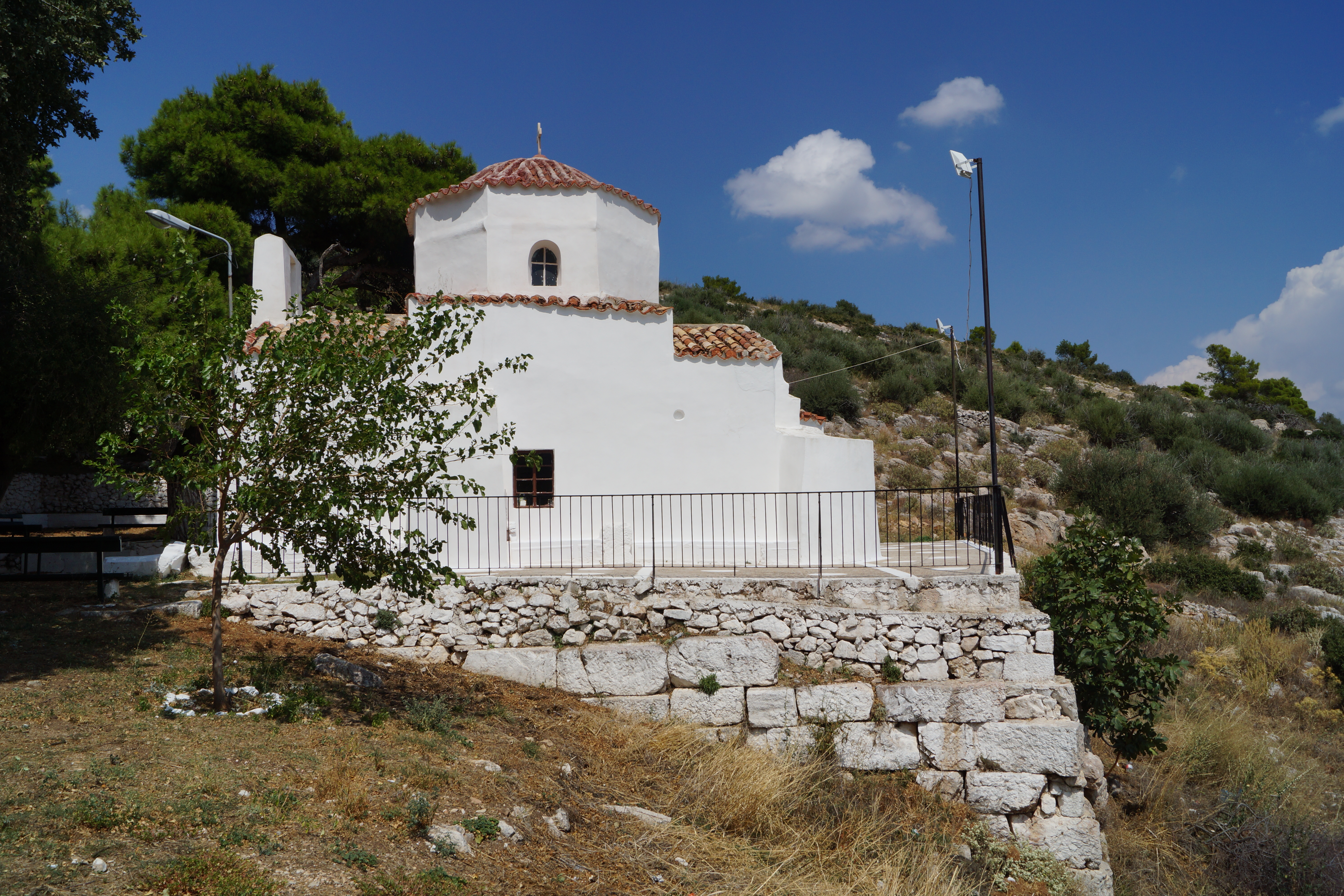
The church of St Elijah at Koropi.

There are several notable Byzantine monasteries on the mountain, including:

- Kaisariani Monastery, founded in the 2nd century AD and built into the flank of the mountain, incorporating the ruins of an ancient church. The monastery reached its peak in the 12th and 13th centuries, when it was a political and spiritual centre.
- Monastery of St. John the Theologian, located between Cholargos and Papagou.
- Monastery of St John the Hunter, established on the northern peak of Hymettos in the 12th century.
- Kareas Monastery, located on the west flank of Hymettos near the village of Kareas.
- Asteriou Monastery, located on the northwestern flank of Hymettos, to the west of Kaisariani.

== Urban uses ==
Major campuses of the University of Athens and the National Technical University of Athens (collectively called "University Town") are located on the west-facing slope, between the A62 motorway, a ring road connected with the A6, and the urban sprawl of Athens. A transmitter park for several major TV and radio stations, along with military radar is located at the top of the mountain. Built up urban areas almost surround the entire mountain range. Access to the top of the mountain is restricted to authorized vehicles for maintenance of the towers.

Almost all of Attica, Athens' eastern suburbs and the new airport can be seen from the mountain top along with the mountains of Parnitha to its northwest, Penteli to its north and Aigaleo to its west. The valley areas that create the lowest passes are to the south and one further south.

The mountain range features about six to seven landfills in the western part and another in the eastern part.
