= Glyka Nera =

Glyka Nera Γλυκά Νερά
- Municipal unit
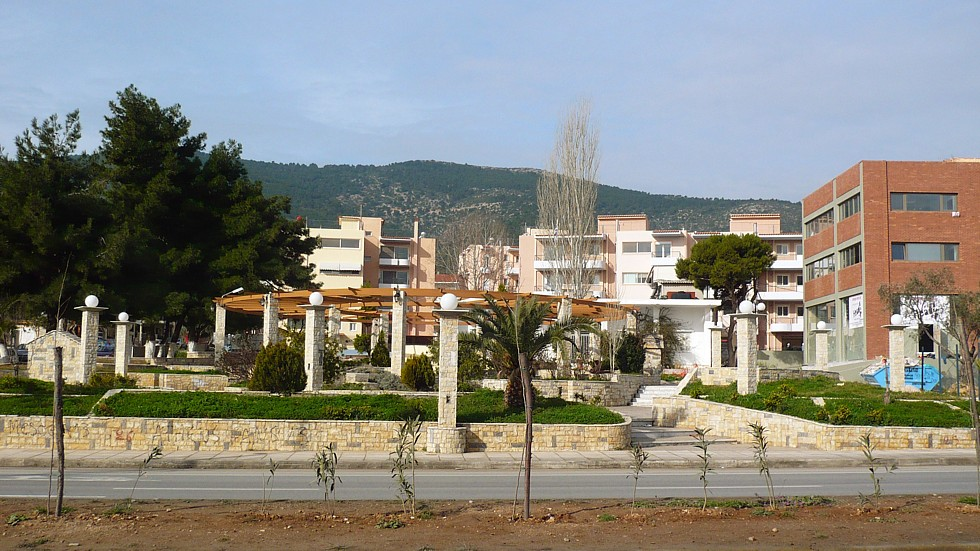
- Main Square

- Location within the regional unit

- Location within Greece
- Coordinates: 37°59.5′N 23°50.9′E
- Country: Greece
- Administrative region: Attica
- Regional unit: East Attica
- Municipality: Paiania

Area
  - Municipal unit: 9.238 km^{2} (3.567 sq mi)
- Elevation: 220 m (720 ft)

Population (2021)
  - Municipal unit: 11,877
  - Municipal unit density: 1,286/km^{2} (3,330/sq mi)
- Time zone: UTC+2 (EET)
  - Summer (DST): UTC+3 (EEST)
- Postal code: 153 xx
- Area code: 210
- Vehicle registration: Z
- Website: paiania.gov.gr

Glyka Nera (Greek: Γλυκά Νερά [ɣliˈka neˈra], meaning "sweet waters", named after an underground water source) is a suburb in the northeastern part of Athens Metropolitan Area in Attica, Greece. Since the 2011 local government reform, it belongs to the East Attica regional unit and is part of the municipality Paiania, of which it is a municipal unit. The municipal unit has an area of 9.238 km^{2}.

== Geography ==
Glyka Nera is situated on the eastern slope of the northernmost part of the forested Hymettus mountain. It is 11 km east of central Athens, and 11 km northwest of the Eleftherios Venizelos International Airport. Adjacent towns are Gerakas to the northeast and Paiania to the south. The A62 Hymettus Ring Road (formerly the A64 until 2024) passes north of the town.

== Historical population ==
Year	Population
1981	3,547
1991	5,813
2001	6,623
2011	11,049
2021	11,877

== Gallery ==
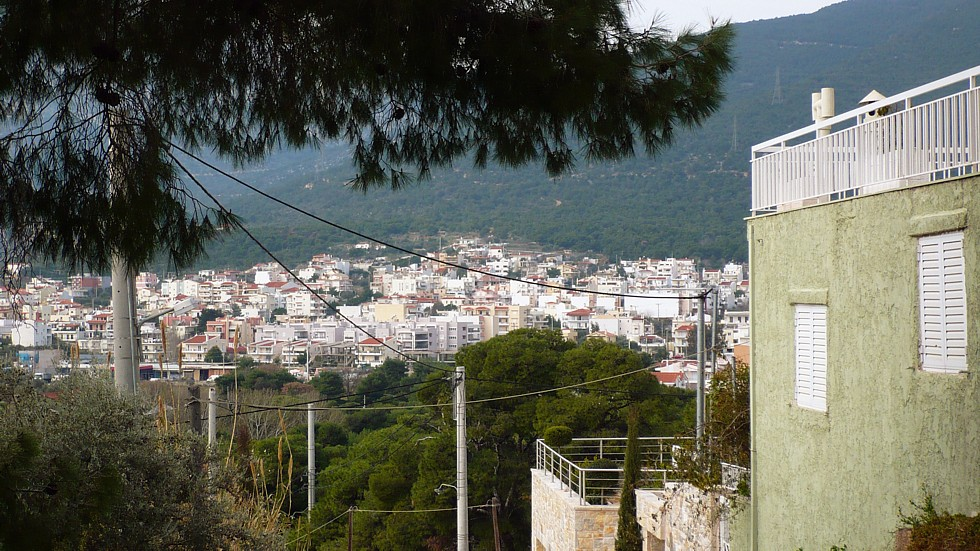
Panorama

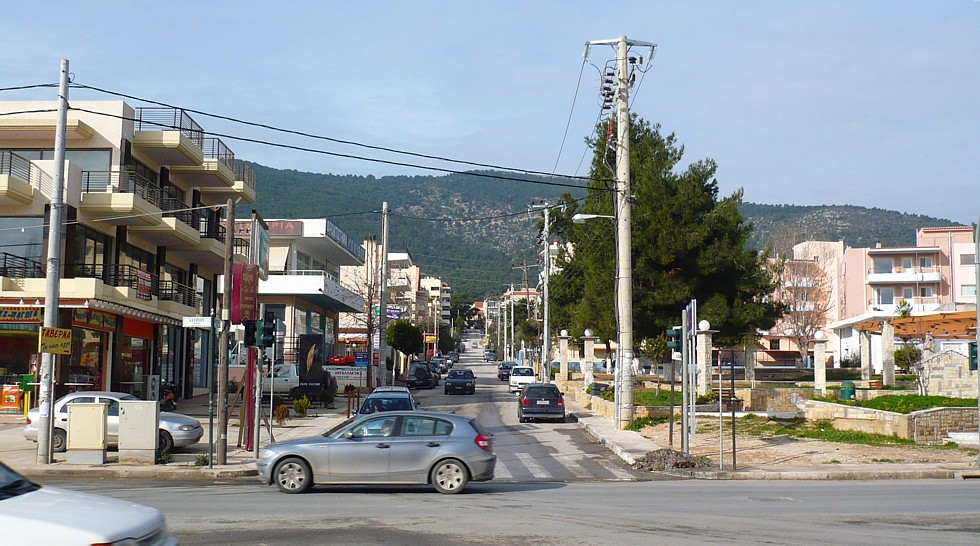
Downtown

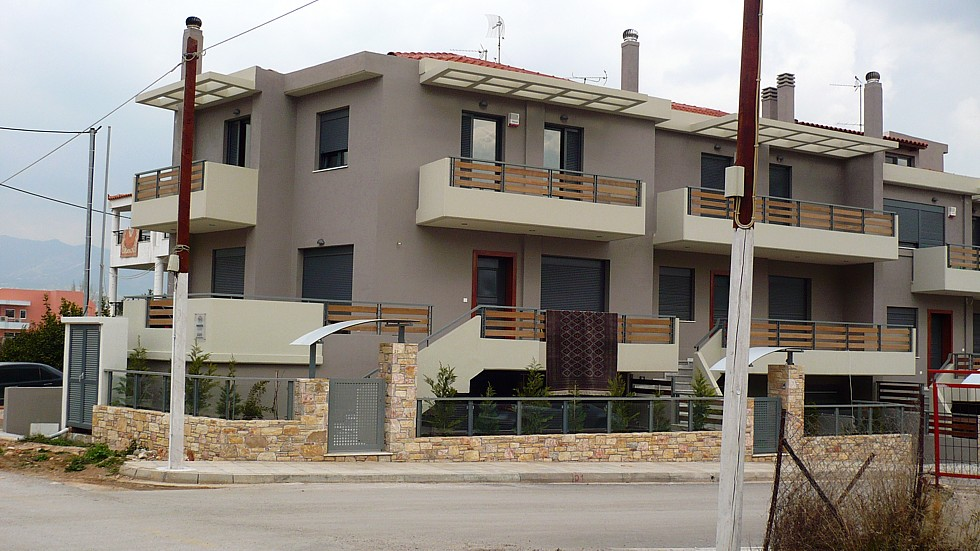
Architecture of Stavros

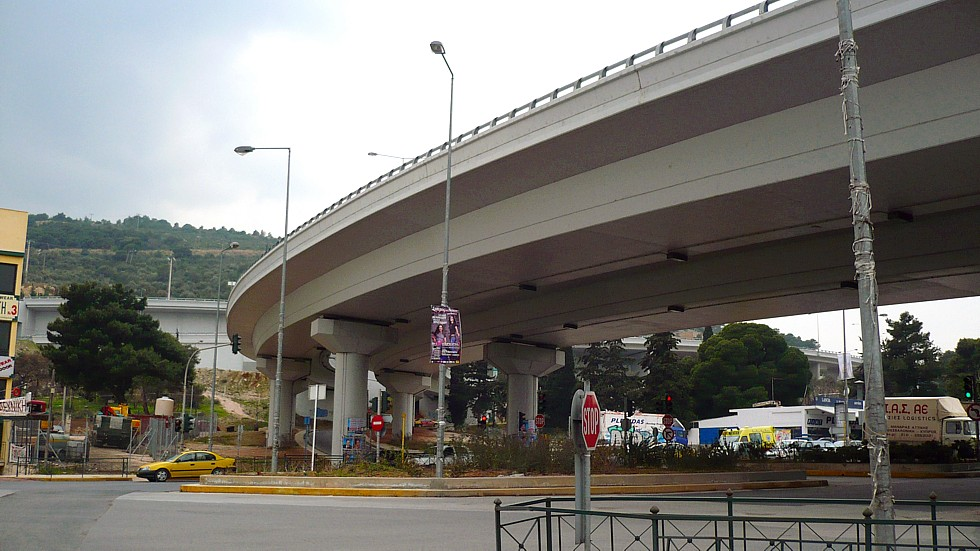
Stavros road junction

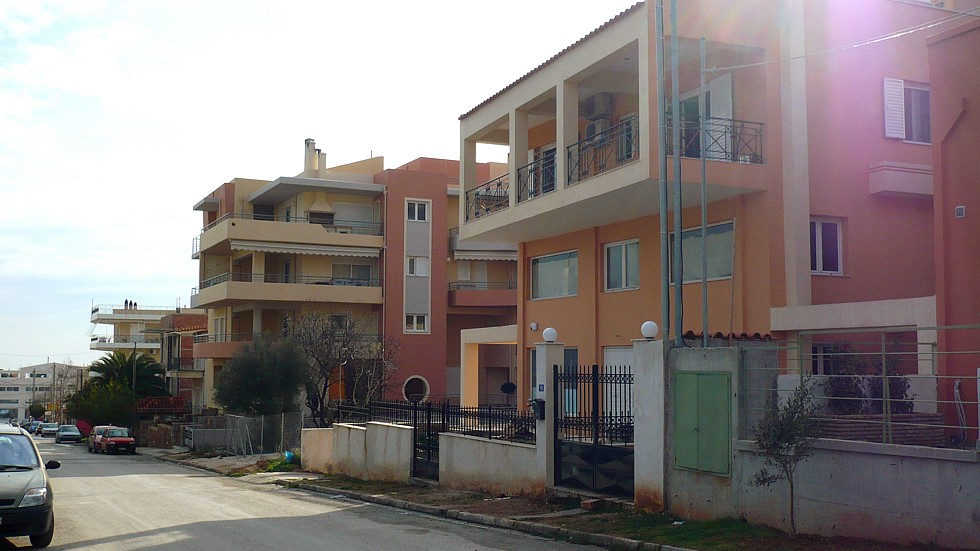
Residential architecture

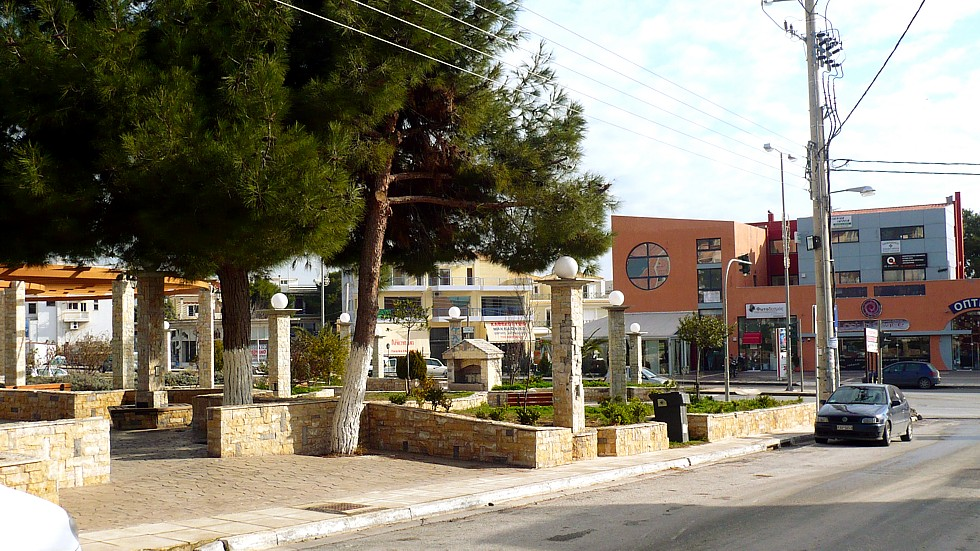
Main square

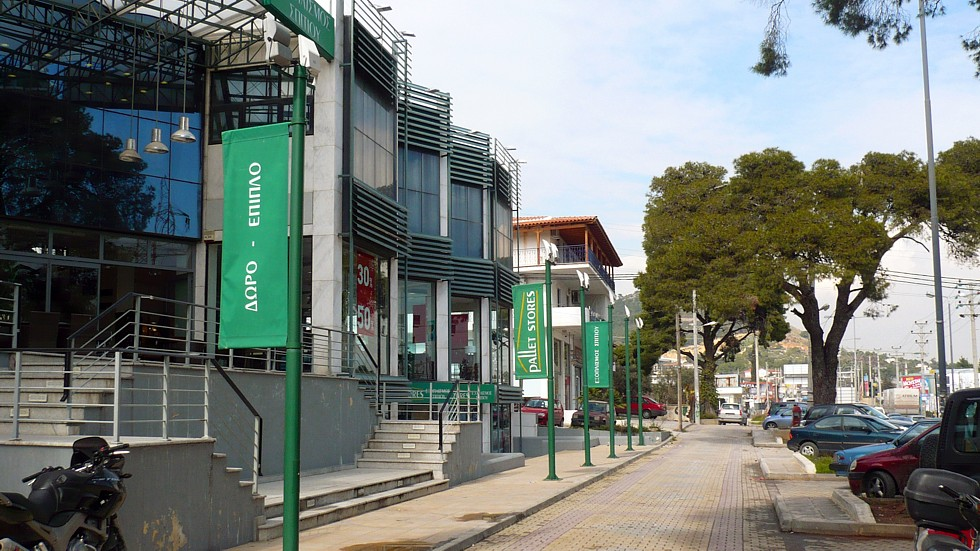
Shopping area

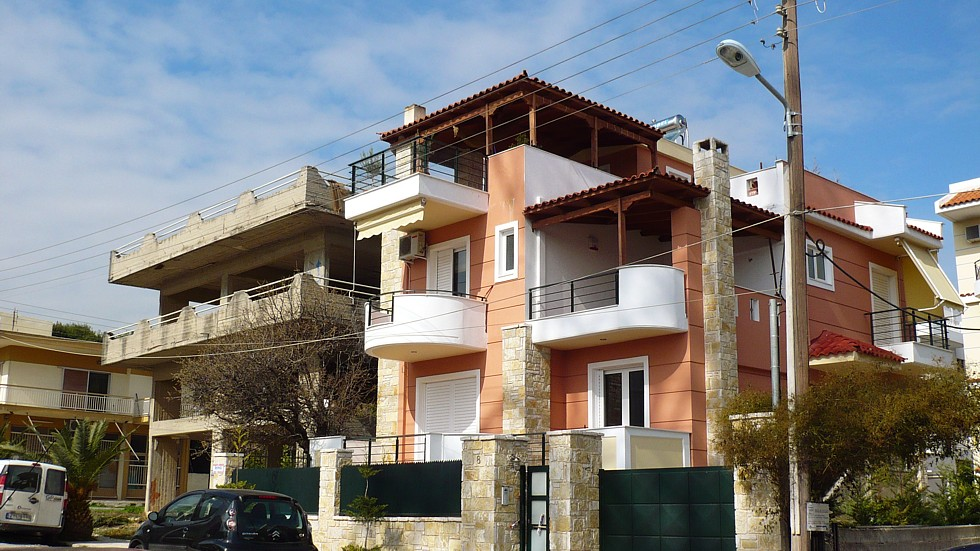
Residential architecture

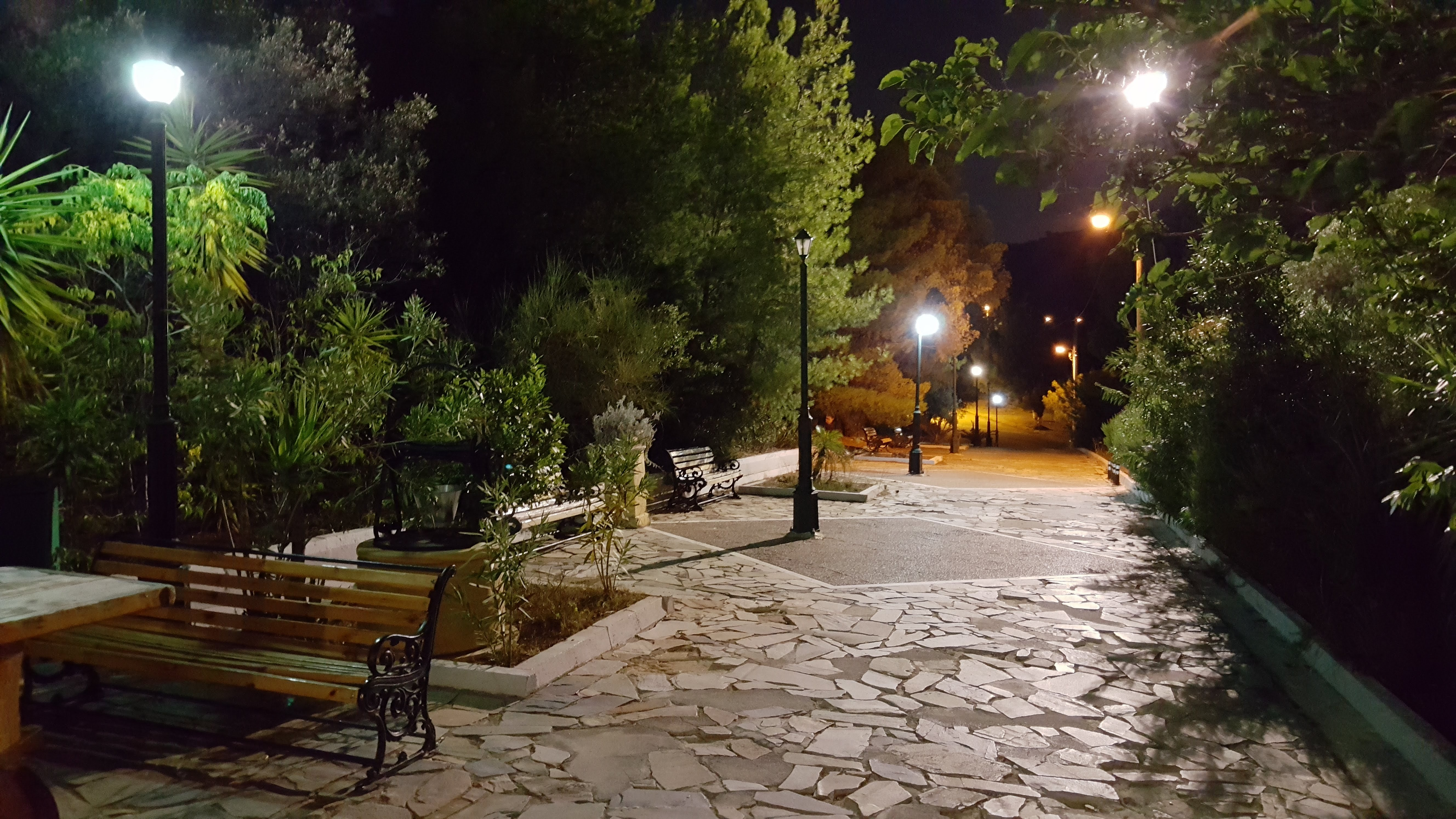
Road behind the church of Metamorfoseos Sotiros

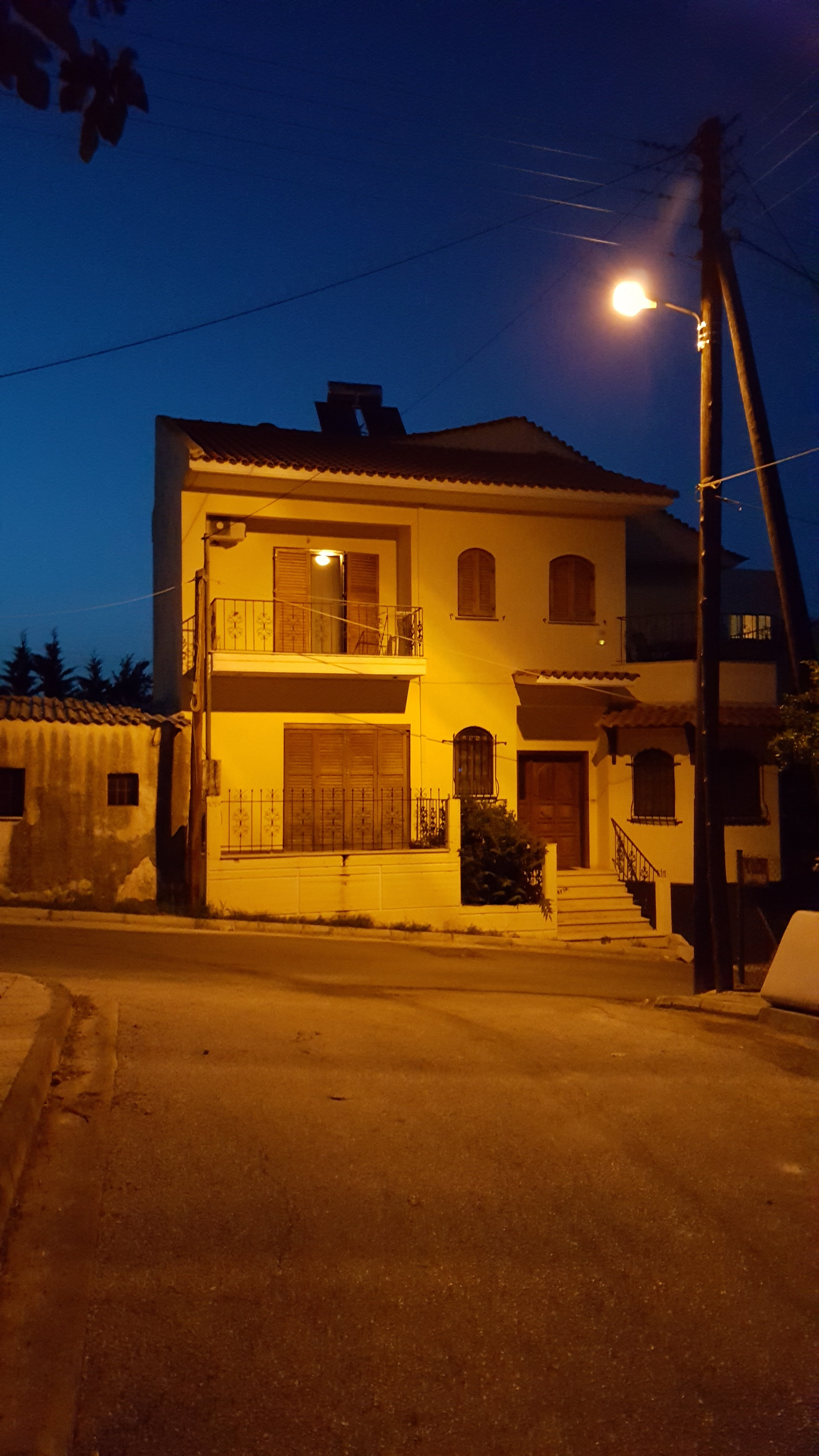
Night residential street scene

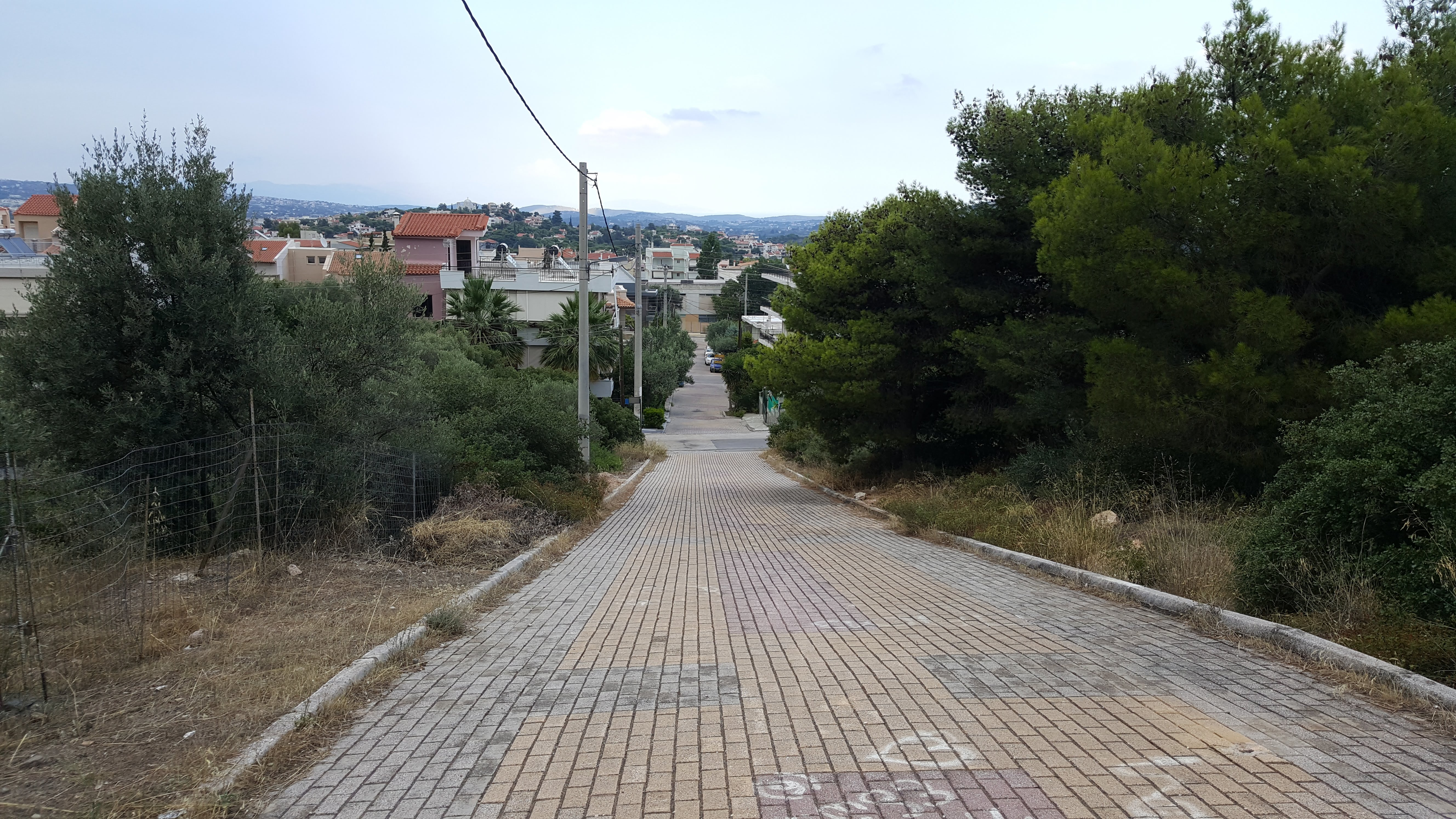
Looking down from hill

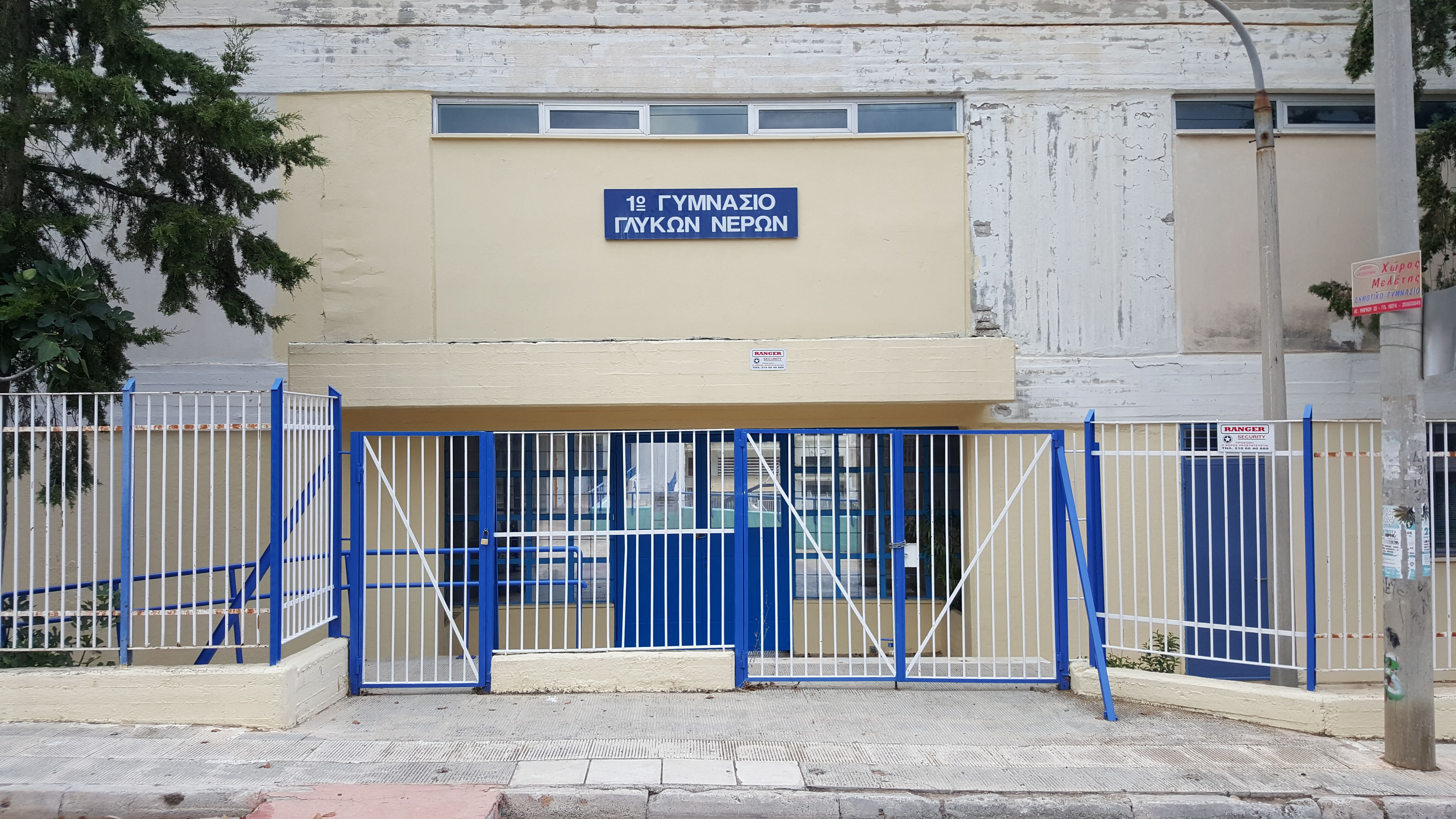
Middle school

== See also ==
- List of municipalities of Attica
