= Jaqueline Tyrwhitt =

British town planner (1905–1983)

Mary Jaqueline Tyrwhitt (25 May 1905 – 21 February 1983) was a British town planner, journalist, editor and educator. She was at the centre of the transnational network of theoreticians and practitioners who shaped the post-war Modern Movement in decentralized community design, residential architecture and social reform. She contributed to developing methods for the application of the ideas of Patrick Geddes, as well as publicizing them. Tyrwhitt had not met Geddes, but she was able to extract some key ideas and concepts from his writings. She brought Geddesian thinking into conferences, discussions, curricula, publications, and policy documents.

In the 1950s she was a professor at the University of Toronto, where she helped establish a graduate program in city and regional planning. Then, in 1955, she moved to the Harvard Graduate School of Design in the Department of City Planning and Landscape Architecture, where she taught for many years until her retirement.

== Early life and education ==
Mary Jaqueline Tyrwhitt was born in Pretoria, South Africa, to Thomas Tyrwhitt and Jaqueline Frances Otter. In Pretoria her father worked as an architect in the public Works Department, where he designed public buildings as part of the reconstruction effort after the Boer War of 1899-1902.

== Before the war ==
Although Jaqueline wanted to pursue a history scholarship at Oxford, her father did not allow her to. Instead, she prepared for the general horticultural examination of the Royal Horticultural Society, which she passed with high marks in March 1924. The following September she was among eight women in a group of 30 students who comprised the first-year class at the Architectural Association (AA) which at that time still followed traditional Beaux Arts principles and methods. In mid-1926 she took a job working for a small firm of "garden architects" in her London neighbourhood and was also enrolled in an evening course at the London School of Economics.

== Interwar work and professional development ==
Tyrwhitt spent the first nine months of 1937 studying town planning and land settlement at the Technische Hochschule in Berlin (TH-Berlin). Back in England Tyrwhitt enrolled in the SPRRD, graduating with honours in 1939. She was also involved as members stayed in constant touch with Sir Barlow and kept him apprised of their work. The Industries Group report, "Location of Industry in Great Britain", published in March 1939.

== World War II and post-war ==
Tyrwhitt served as both Director of Research and Director of Studies during World War II at the School of Planning and Research for Regional Development, where she worked for seven years. Beginning in 1941 she worked under Lord Reith with the Association for Planning and Regional Reconstruction for wartime mapping of social statistics and planning for postwar reconstruction. She worked with, among others, Anthony Pott, Anne Radford Wheeler, Alison Milne, Bunty Wills, Peter Saxl, and Lady Eve Balfour.

In 1951 she left England for Canada and helped establish a graduate program in city and regional planning, where along with University of Toronto colleague Marshall McLuhan, anthropologist Edmund Carpenter, political economist Tom Easterbrook, and psychologist D. Carl Williams, she co-founded the Explorations Group and the Ford Foundation Seminar on Culture and Communication at the University of Toronto in 1953. The next 18 years were spent working for the School of Graduate Studies in Toronto, for the United Nations in India (1953–54). Tyrwhitt reached 50 in May 1955, and her career started a new, very prolific phase.

== 1960–76: turning east ==
Tyrwhitt assisted in introducing a new urban design curriculum at GSD as an Assistant Professor of City Planning at Harvard. She was also instrumental in establishing a new school of planning in Indonesia through a collaboration between Harvard and the United Nations, facilitating the internationalisation of the university and planning education.She retired from Harvard in 1969, and moved to Greece, where she was appointed editor of the journal Ekistics, whose publisher, architect Constantine Doxiadis, was a friend.

== Publications ==
- Jaqueline Tyrwhitt (ed.), Patrick Geddes in India, London, Lund Humphries, 1947, OCLC 352855
- Jaqueline Tyrwhitt and Gwen Bell (eds.), Human Identity in the Urban Environment, London, Pelican Books, 1971, ISBN 978-0140213645
- Mary Jaqueline Tyrwhitt, Making a Garden on a Greek Hillside, Limni, Denise Harvey & Co., 1998, ISBN 978-9607120144
- Jaqueline Tyrwhitt, Society and Environment: A Historical Review, London, Routledge, 2015, ISBN 978-0415706599

== Death ==
Tyrwhitt died at her home in Paiania, Greece, at the age of 77, on 21 February 1983.
