= Paiania =

Paiania Παιανία Λοπε̱σ
- Municipality
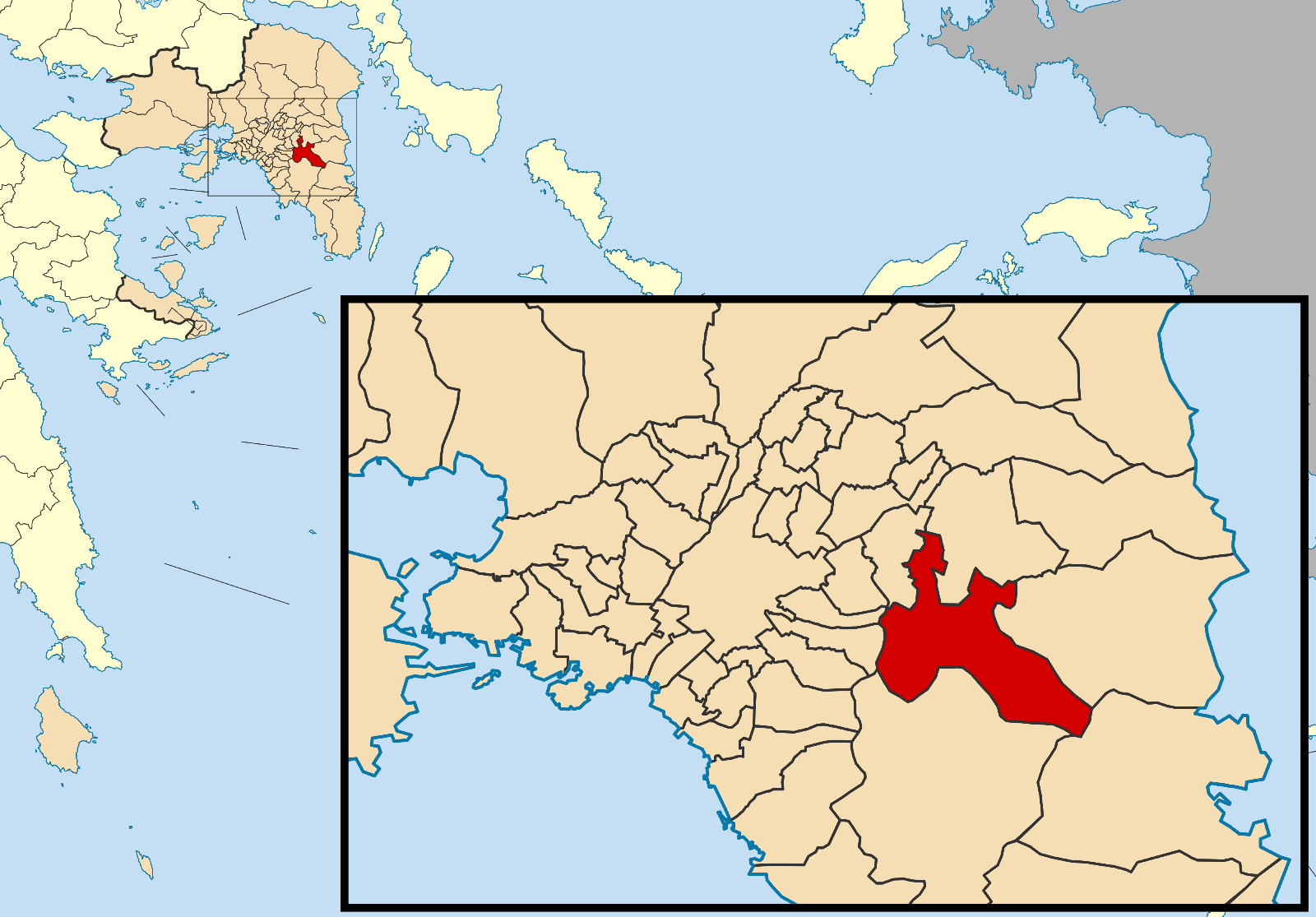

- Location within Greece
- Coordinates: 37°57′N 23°51′E
- Country: Greece
- Administrative region: Attica
- Regional unit: East Attica

Government
  - Mayor: Isidoros Madis (since 2019)

Area
  - Municipality: 53.16 km^{2} (20.53 sq mi)
  - Municipal unit: 43.92 km^{2} (16.96 sq mi)
- Elevation: 160 m (520 ft)

Population (2021)
  - Municipality: 28,036
  - Density: 527.4/km^{2} (1,366/sq mi)
  - Municipal unit: 16,159
  - Municipal unit density: 367.9/km^{2} (952.9/sq mi)
- Time zone: UTC+2 (EET)
  - Summer (DST): UTC+3 (EEST)
- Postal code: 190 02
- Area code: 210
- Vehicle registration: Z
- Website: www.paiania.gov.gr

Paiania (Note: Also known as Paeanea or Peania) (Greek: Παιανία, Greek pronunciation: [pe.a.ˈni.a], before 1915: Λιόπεσι - Liopesi, pronounced [ˈʎo.pe.si]; Arvanitika: Λοπε̱σ romanized: Lopës) is a town and a municipality in East Attica, Greece. It is a suburb of Athens, located east of Mount Hymettus and 11 km east of the Athens city centre.

Paiania is home to the Vorres Museum of Folk and Contemporary Art, the Foundation European Art Center (EUARCE) of Greece, the broadcasting facilities of Greek television station Open TV and the former training facilities of football club Panathinaikos F.C.. The Greek National Road 89 passes through the town, and the A6 motorway passes east of it. The town was renamed to reflect association with the ancient deme of Paeania.

== History ==
In the late Middle Ages, the area was the site of Albanian (Arvanite) settlement, as can be seen from its toponym.

== Municipality ==
The municipality Paiania was formed at the 2011 local government reform by the merger of the following 2 former municipalities, that became municipal units:

- Glyka Nera
- Paiania

The municipality has an area of 53.155 km^{2}, the municipal unit 43.917 km^{2}. The municipal unit of Paiania also includes the village of Argithea.

== Notable people ==
- Demades (380–318 BC), orator and demagogue.
- Demosthenes (384–322 BC), orator and demagogue.
- Jaqueline Tyrwhitt (1905–1983), British architect and founder of the garden of Speroza, Mediterranean Garden Society
- Philippides of Peania (293 BC), archon Basileus and son of Philomelos.

== Bibliography ==
- Koder, Johannes; Hild, Friedrich (1976). Tabula Imperii Byzantini, Band 1: Hellas und Thessalia (in German). Vienna: Verlag der Österreichischen Akademie der Wissenschaften. ISBN 978-3-7001-0182-6.
