= Cholargos =

Ηolargos Χολαργός
- Municipal unit
- Location within North Athens regional unit

- Location within Greece
- Coordinates: 38°0′N 23°48′E
- Country: Greece
- Administrative region: Attica
- Regional unit: North Athens
- Municipality: Papagou-Cholargos

Area
  - Municipal unit: 3.950 km^{2} (1.525 sq mi)
- Elevation: 202 m (663 ft)

Population (2021)
  - Municipal unit: 31,304
  - Municipal unit density: 7,925/km^{2} (20,530/sq mi)
- Time zone: UTC+2 (EET)
  - Summer (DST): UTC+3 (EEST)
- Postal code: 155 61, 155 62
- Area code: 210 65
- Vehicle registration: I, Y, Z

Cholargos (Greek: Χολαργός, also: Holargos) is a town and a suburb in the Athens urban area, Greece, located northeast of the Athens city proper and about 6 kilometers (3.7 miles) away from Syntagma Square. Since the 2011 local government reform it is part of the municipality Papagou-Cholargos, of which it is the seat and a municipal unit. The municipal unit has an area of 3.950 km^{2}. The main thoroughfare is Mesogeion Avenue, which connects Cholargos with central Athens and the A6 motorway.

Cholargos was the name of a deme of ancient Attica. The most prominent citizen of ancient Cholargos was Pericles. Cholargos was part of the community of Chalandri until 1933, when it became a separate community. It became a municipality in 1963.

== Name ==
The name "Cholargos" was given in honour of the ancient municipality of the same name in Ancient Athens, from which the famous Athenian politician and general, Pericles. Philological and archaeological (epigraphic) evidence, however, proves that the ancient deme was in a quite different location from the present-day Cholargos, specifically near Ilion, perhaps also Kamatero.

== History ==
In antiquity, today's Cholargos was part of the Athenian deme of Phlya. Archaeological findings testify to the settlement of the area from the Early Helladic period. These finds are located at the foothills of Hymettus, while later ones testify to the existence of life during the Classical and Hellenistic times. Many burial monuments date back to the 5th and 4th centuries BC.

There are also signs of life from the Roman, Byzantine, and late Byzantine periods, while during the times of Turkish rule the land of Cholargos remains deserted.

On March 1, 1926, the cooperative "Agropoleon Company" was founded in order to search for land for building. Its founder was Panagiotis Voutsinas and its members were Georgios Ventouris, Ioannis Katssibiris, Nikolaos Saligaros, Pasithea Zouroudi-Saligarou (wife of the former), Ioannis Karydis, and Georgios Mansolas. The first house built by this company was the two-storey mansion of its founder, Panagiotis Voutsinas, at the junction of Pericles Avenue and Evripidou Street. On August 10, 1937, the Community Council of Cholargos decided to rename Evripidou Street to Panagiotou Voutsinas' Street and the then President of the Community of Cholargos, Nikolaos Vitalis, placed a marble plaque next to the entrance of his mansion, which read: To Panagiotis Voutsinas, founder of Cholargos, in honour of him. In July 1962, the construction of the Church of Panagia Faneromeni of Cholargos began in the square of the same name, on the site of a small church of the same name that was demolished. Among those who made donations for the building of this church was Voutsinas, but the initiator of the project was the priest Ioannis Ventouris.

It was part of the administrative region of the community of Chalandri and in 1930 it was detached from Chalandri and declared an autonomous community.

During the period of occupation, a unit of the Italian army occupied Cholargos and established its headquarters. With the advance of the Germans, building activity ceased and by the time of the liberation of Greece, the area was in a very bad state.

However, Cholargos has been slowly rebuilt from the ashes, with its inhabitants turning to petty trade so that they could stand on their feet and rebuild their city. The first residential development of Cholargos began with the internal migration of Athenians in the 1960s, which triggered the mass construction of the area. In Athens, this period has been marked by the need to restore the capital and its inhabitants in every way possible. This decade, as well as the following one, was the foundation of current form of the area. The typical apartment buildings of mass housing that are also being built in the centre of Athens are replacing the picturesque villas and elegant mansions of the old Cholargos.

In a second phase, the operation of the Greek "Pentagon" on the border with the central sector of Athens and the building saturation of the neighbouring Papagos by military workers motivated the preference for Cholargos. In the following years, with the development of the neighbouring municipalities of Chalandri and Agia Paraskevi and the introduction of the term "Northern Suburbs", a geographically abstract term for that time, the value of real estate increased even more.

== Climate ==
Cholargos, as most of Attica, features a typical Mediterranean climate with hot, dry summers and cool, wet winters. Because of its location at the base of mountain Hymettus, Cholargos is strongly influenced by cold air masses that travel down the mountain, hence it is cooler than most of Athens, like downtown Athens or seaside locations.

Below is the data for the Nomismatokopeio Station. The station is active since 1 July 2020, so 2021 is the only year which was registered whole.

The following chart is not highly accurate, since it features only one year of record, but can be used as a guideline.

Climate data for Nomismatokopeio 2021
Month	Jan	Feb	Mar	Apr	May	Jun	Jul	Aug	Sep	Oct	Nov	Dec	Year
Mean daily maximum °C (°F)	14.2 (57.6)	14.8 (58.6)	15.1 (59.2)	19.5 (67.1)	26.9 (80.4)	29.6 (85.3)	33.4 (92.1)	33.9 (93.0)	27.4 (81.3)	20.2 (68.4)	18.2 (64.8)	13.5 (56.3)	22.22 (72.00)
Daily mean °C (°F)	10.9 (51.6)	11.0 (51.8)	11.2 (52.2)	15 (59)	22.0 (71.6)	24.9 (76.8)	29.0 (84.2)	29.2 (84.6)	23.3 (73.9)	16.9 (62.4)	14.9 (58.8)	10.7 (51.3)	18.25 (64.85)
Mean daily minimum °C (°F)	7.9 (46.2)	7.7 (45.9)	8.0 (46.4)	11.1 (52.0)	17.9 (64.2)	20.9 (69.6)	25.3 (77.5)	25.4 (77.7)	20.0 (68.0)	14.5 (58.1)	12.3 (54.1)	8.0 (46.4)	14.92 (58.86)
Average rainfall mm (inches)	44.4 (1.75)	20 (0.8)	10.4 (0.41)	16 (0.6)	0 (0)	24 (0.9)	0 (0)	0 (0)	0 (0)	130.4 (5.13)	53.6 (2.11)	96.2 (3.79)	395 (15.6)
Source: National Observatory of Athens (N.O.A.)

== Historical population ==
Year	Population
1981	31,703
1991	33,691
2001	32,166
2011	30,840
2021	31,304

== Government and infrastructure ==
The headquarters of the Ministry of Infrastructure, Transport, and Networks are in Cholargos.

== Gallery ==
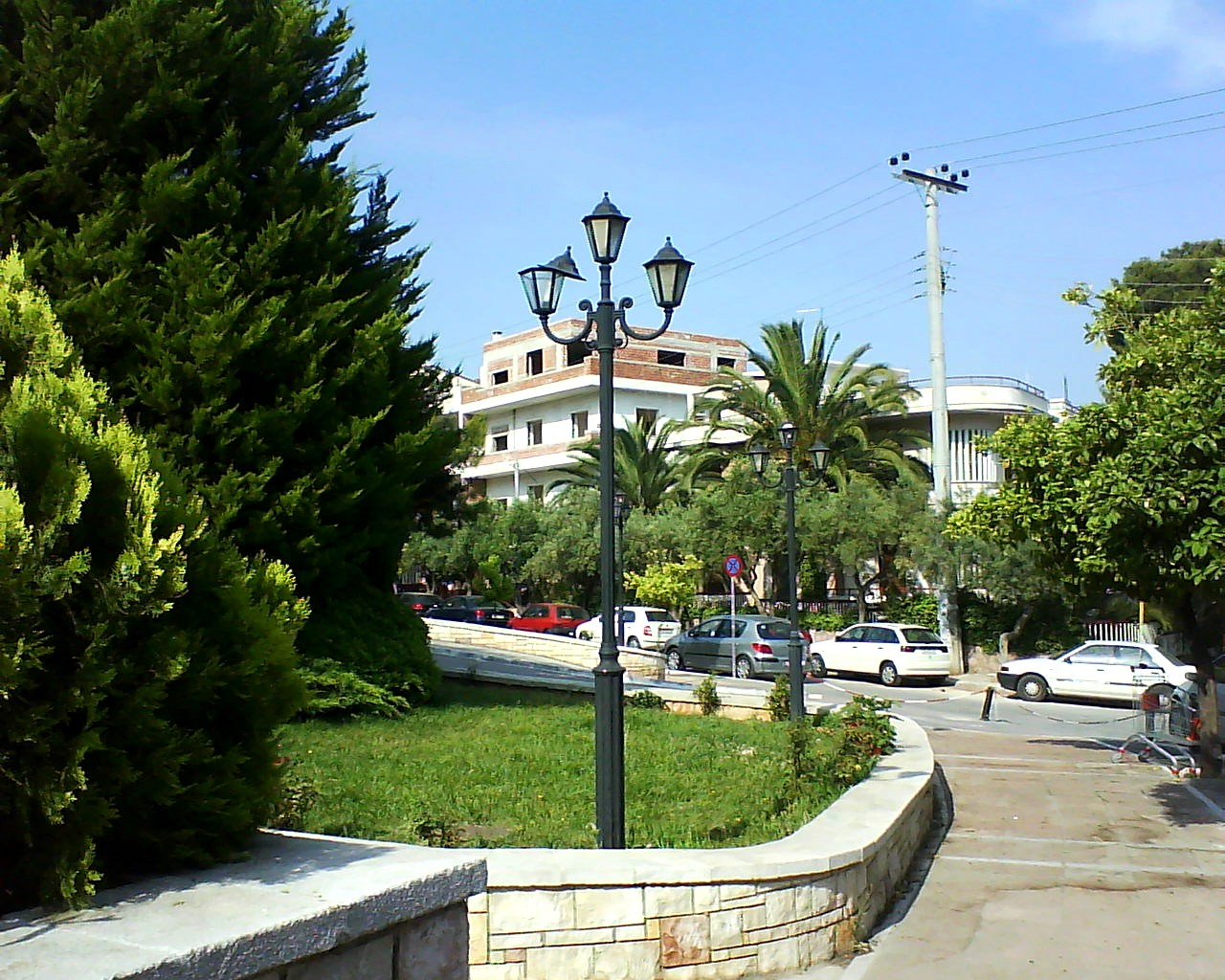
City's aesthetic

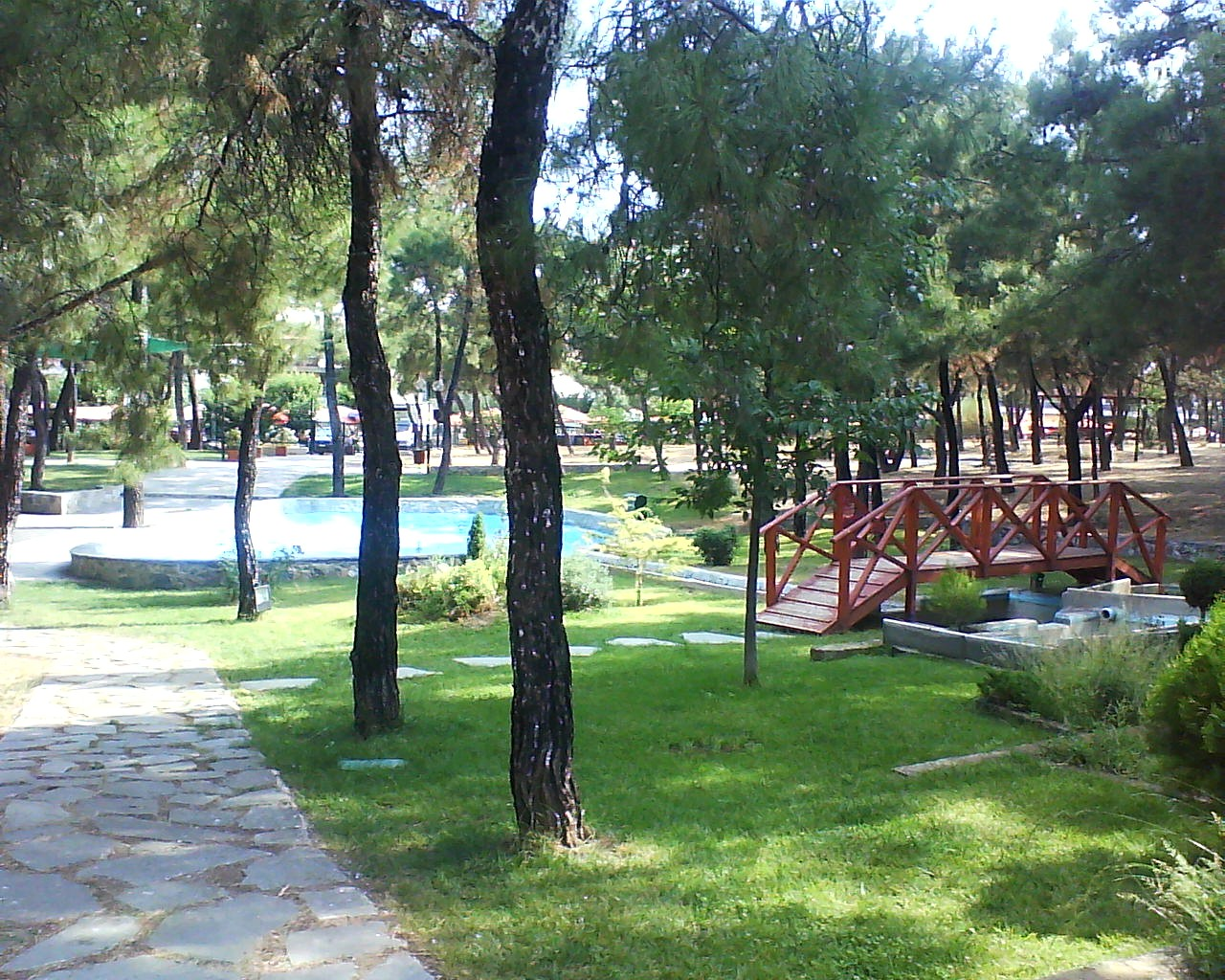
Cholargos municipal park

Agia Triada Church

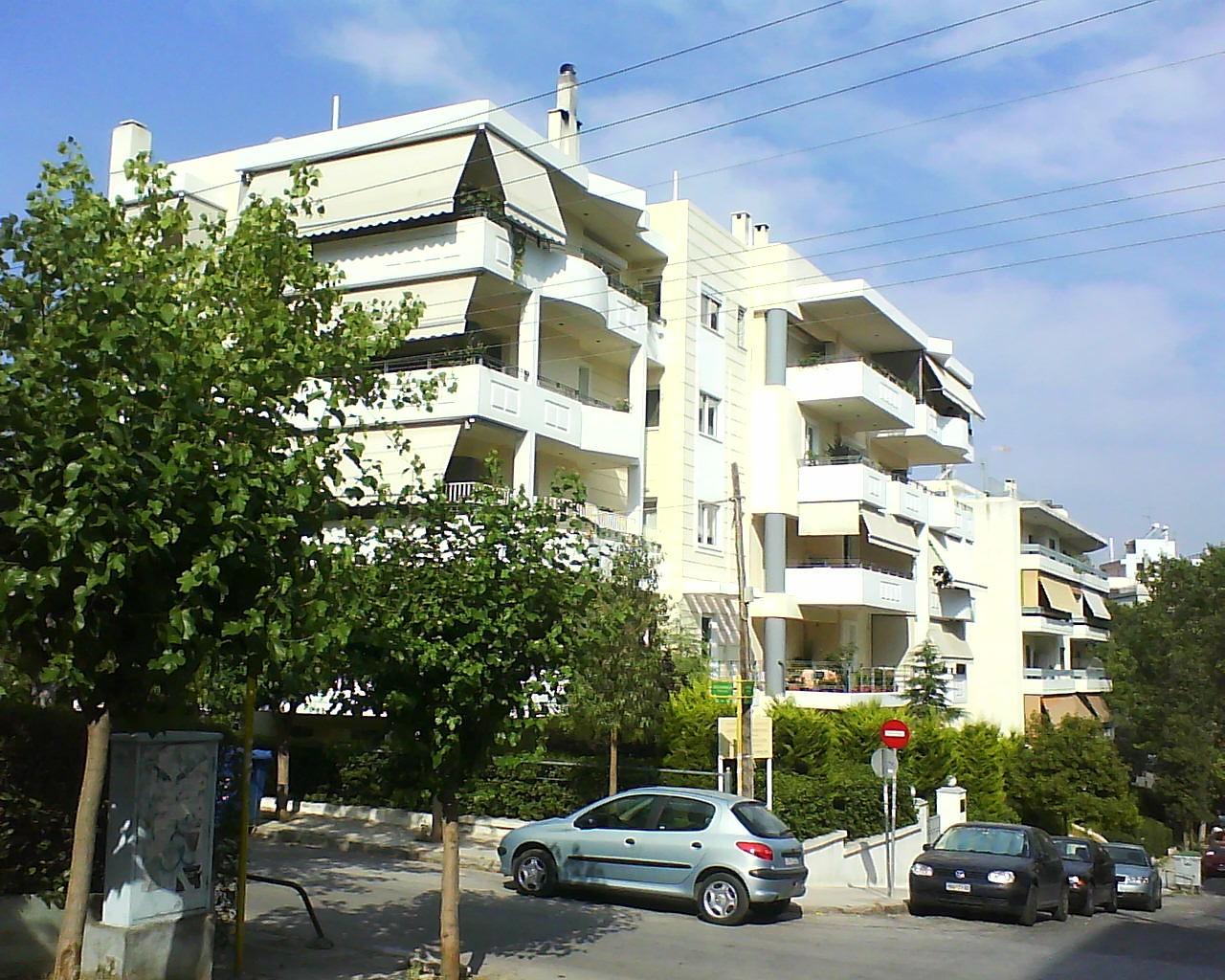
Urban neighbourhood

== See also ==
- List of settlements in Attica
- Holargos B.C.
