= Voula =

Voula Βούλα
- Municipal unit
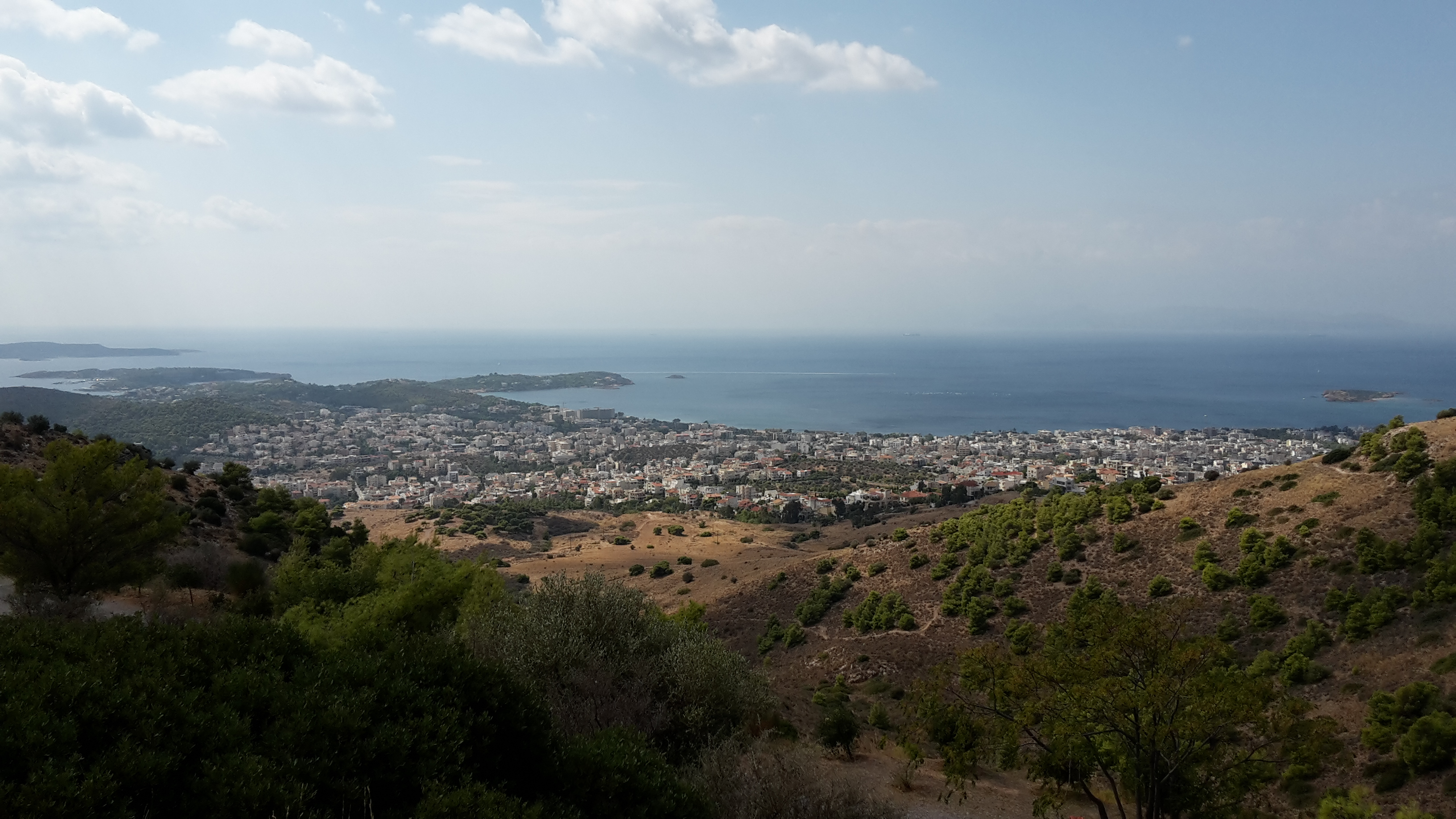
- View of Voula

- Location within the regional unit

- Location within Greece
- Coordinates: 37°51′N 23°45′E
- Country: Greece
- Administrative region: Attica
- Regional unit: East Attica
- Municipality: Vari-Voula-Vouliagmeni

Area
  - Municipal unit: 8.787 km^{2} (3.393 sq mi)
- Elevation: 5 m (16 ft)

Population (2021)
  - Municipal unit: 31,497
  - Municipal unit density: 3,584/km^{2} (9,284/sq mi)
- Time zone: UTC+2 (EET)
  - Summer (DST): UTC+3 (EEST)
- Postal code: 166 73
- Area code: 210
- Vehicle registration: Z
- Website: www.vvv.gov.gr/

Voula (Greek: Βούλα) is a southern suburb of Athens along the Athens coast and former municipality in East Attica, Greece. Since the 2011 local government reform it is part of the municipality Vari-Voula-Vouliagmeni, of which it is the seat and a municipal unit. The municipal unit has an area of 8.787 km^{2}.

== Geography ==
Voula is a southern suburb of Athens, 16 km south of the city centre. It is located on the Saronic Gulf coast, at the southwestern foot of the Hymettus mountain. Adjacent coast towns are Glyfada to the northwest and Vouliagmeni to the south. The Greek National Road 91 (Athens centre - Sounio) passes through Voula. One of the largest hospitals in the Athens conurbation, "Asklipieio", lies in the northern part of Voula. It is served by the southern terminus of the Athens Tram line T7, Asklipieio Voulas.

== Climate ==
Voula has a hot semi-arid climate (Köppen climate classification: BSh), bordering on a hot-summer Mediterranean climate (Köppen climate classification: Csa). Voula experiences hot, dry summers and mild, wetter winters. The table below refers to the climate of the nearby weather station of Elliniko.

Climate data for Voula
| Month | Jan | Feb | Mar | Apr | May | Jun | Jul | Aug | Sep | Oct | Nov | Dec | Year |
|---|---|---|---|---|---|---|---|---|---|---|---|---|---|
| Mean daily maximum °C (°F) | 13.12 (55.62) | 13.54 (56.37) | 15.53 (59.95) | 19.21 (66.58) | 24.05 (75.29) | 28.78 (83.80) | 31.64 (88.95) | 31.49 (88.68) | 27.95 (82.31) | 22.96 (73.33) | 18.09 (64.56) | 14.96 (58.93) | 21.78 (71.20) |
| Daily mean °C (°F) | 10.62 (51.12) | 10.69 (51.24) | 12.44 (54.39) | 16.05 (60.89) | 20.53 (68.95) | 25.03 (77.05) | 27.83 (82.09) | 27.57 (81.63) | 24.44 (75.99) | 19.70 (67.46) | 15.62 (60.12) | 12.60 (54.68) | 18.59 (65.47) |
| Mean daily minimum °C (°F) | 8.01 (46.42) | 8.00 (46.40) | 9.04 (48.27) | 12.04 (53.67) | 16.19 (61.14) | 20.55 (68.99) | 23.23 (73.81) | 23.21 (73.78) | 20.32 (68.58) | 16.23 (61.21) | 12.73 (54.91) | 8.68 (47.62) | 14.85 (58.73) |
| Average precipitation mm (inches) | 43.10 (1.70) | 42.29 (1.66) | 52.14 (2.05) | 28.45 (1.12) | 13.08 (0.51) | 5.04 (0.20) | 6.10 (0.24) | 7.47 (0.29) | 7.94 (0.31) | 41.13 (1.62) | 57.62 (2.27) | 60.88 (2.40) | 365.24 (14.37) |
| Mean monthly sunshine hours | 126.60 | 139.94 | 175.04 | 217.10 | 273.56 | 335.36 | 357.11 | 333.66 | 264.72 | 199.50 | 127.82 | 108.55 | 2,658.96 |
Source: Hellenic National Meteorological Service

== Historical population ==
| Year | Population |
|---|---|
| 1981 | 10,539 |
| 1991 | 17,998 |
| 2001 | 25,532 |
| 2011 | 28,364 |
| 2021 | 31,497 |

== Sports ==
Voula hosts the football club Aris Voulas, founded in 1952, the basketball club Proteas Voulas, founded in 1980 and the women's volleyball team Thetis founded in 2000.

== See also ==
- List of municipalities of Attica
