= Papagou =

Papagou Παπάγου
- Municipal unit
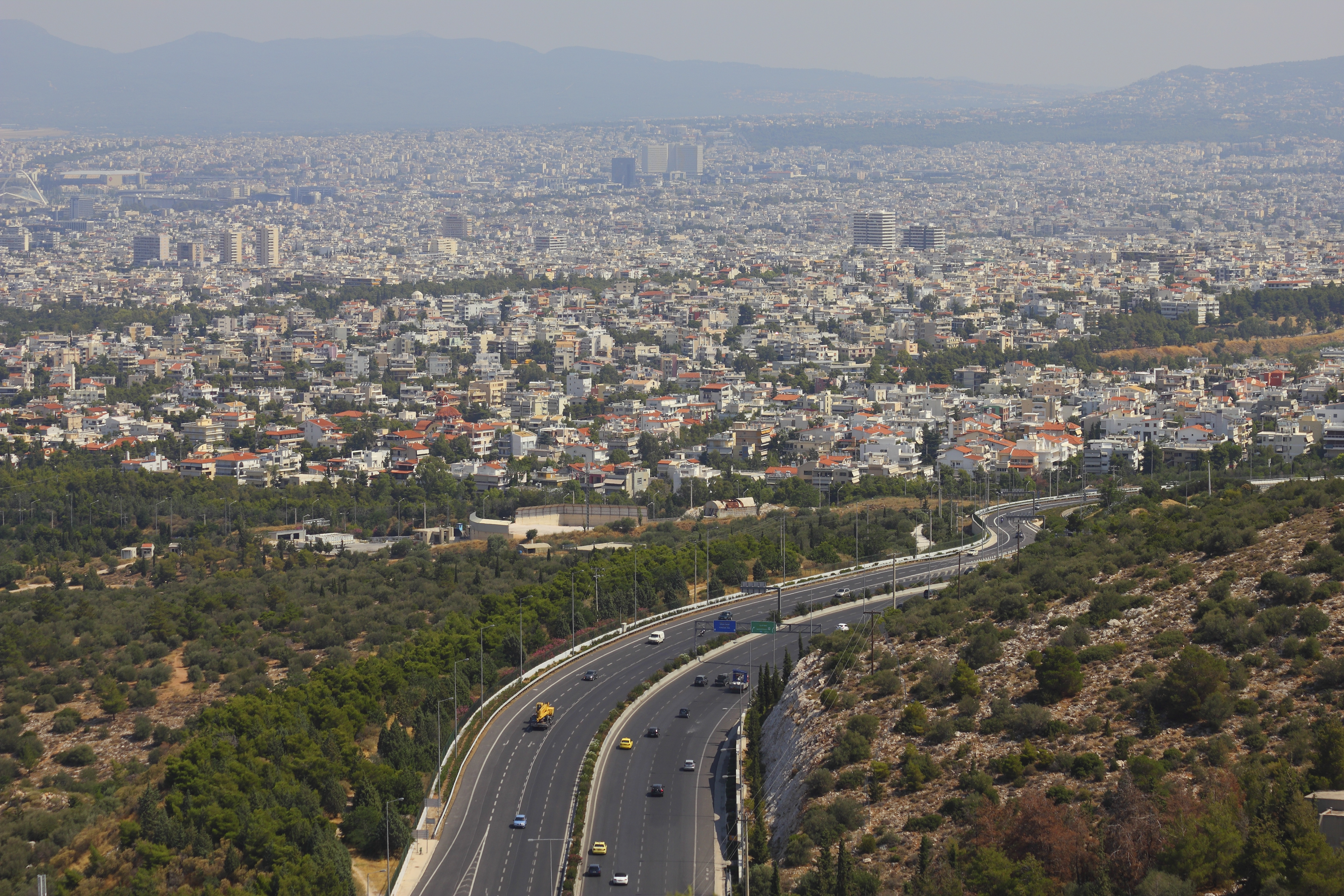

- Location within North Athens regional unit

- Location within Greece
- Coordinates: 37°59.4′N 23°47.6′E
- Country: Greece
- Administrative region: Attica
- Regional unit: North Athens
- Municipality: Papagou-Cholargos

Area
  - Municipal unit: 3.375 km^{2} (1.303 sq mi)
- Elevation: 200 m (660 ft)

Population (2021)
  - Municipal unit: 13,962
  - Municipal unit density: 4,137/km^{2} (10,710/sq mi)
- Time zone: UTC+2 (EET)
  - Summer (DST): UTC+3 (EEST)
- Postal code: 156 69
- Area code: 210 65
- Vehicle registration: I, Y, Z

Papagou (Greek: Παπάγου or Παπάγος Papagos) is a suburban town and municipal unit in the eastern part of the Athens agglomeration, Greece. The town is named after Marshal Alexandros Papagos, a general who led the Greek Army in the Second World War and the Greek Civil War, before becoming Prime Minister of Greece. The Greek Ministry of National Defense is located in town.

Papagou was part of the municipality of Cholargos until 1965, when it became a separate community. It became a municipality in 1982. Since the 2011 local government reform it is part of the municipality Papagou-Cholargos, of which it is a municipal unit according to the Kallikratis Plan.

== Geography ==
Papagou is situated west of the Hymettus mountains, 6 km east of Athens city centre. The municipal unit has an area of 3.375 km^{2}. The A62 Hymettus Ring Road (formerly the A64 until 2024) passes southeast of the town. Adjacent suburbs are Cholargos to the northeast and Zografou to the southwest.

== Sports ==
Papagou B.C. is the professional basketball team of Papagou.

== Historical population ==
Year	Population
1981	12,553
1991	13,974
2001	13,207
2011	13,699
2021	13,962

== Gallery ==
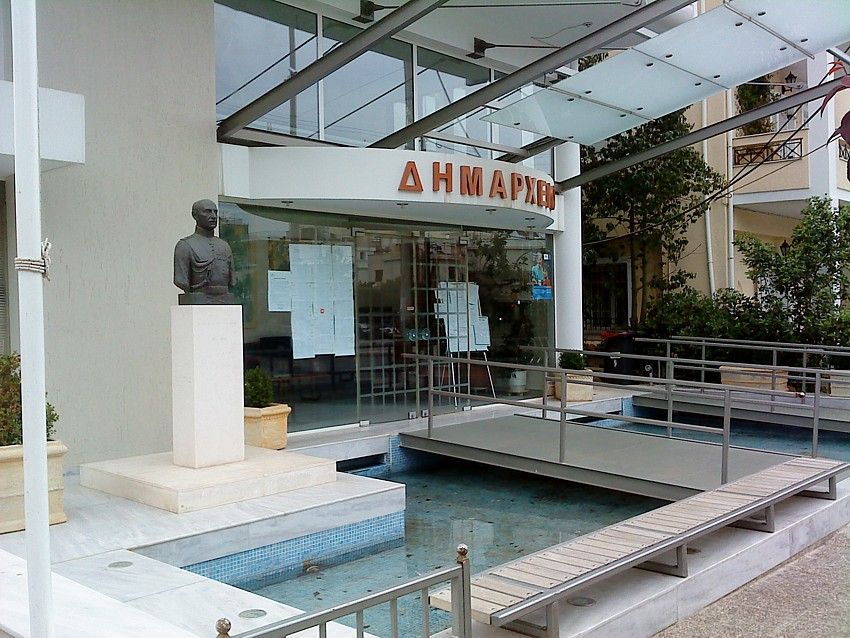
The bust of Alexandros Papagos in front of the town hall

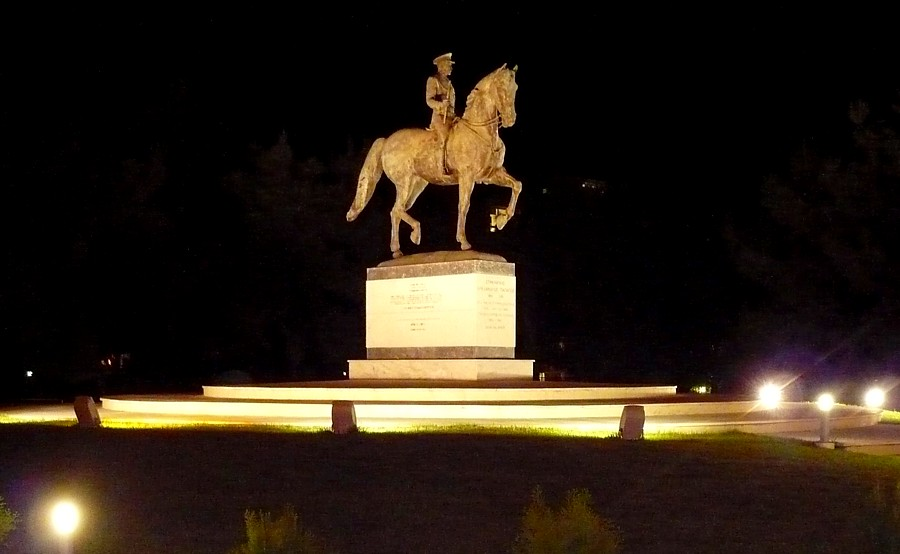
Papagos statue

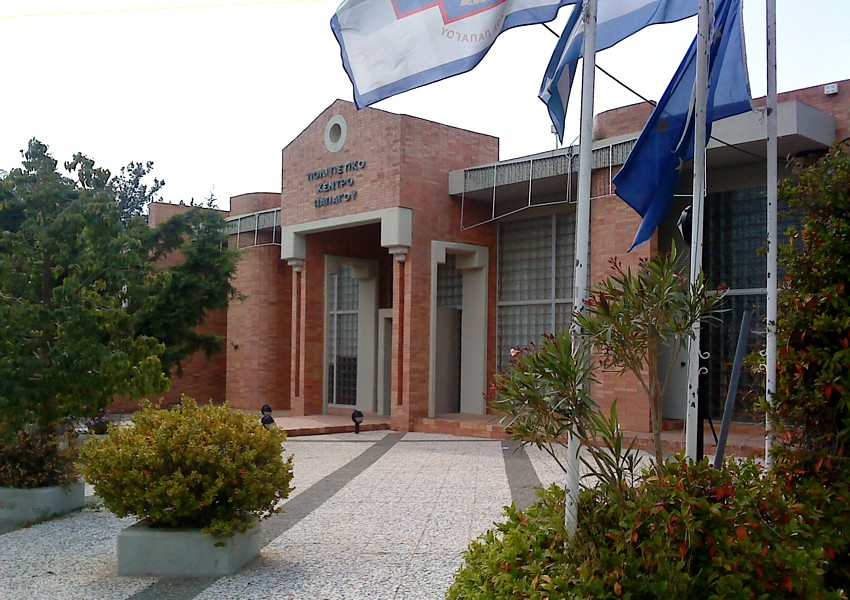
Cultural Hall of Papagou.

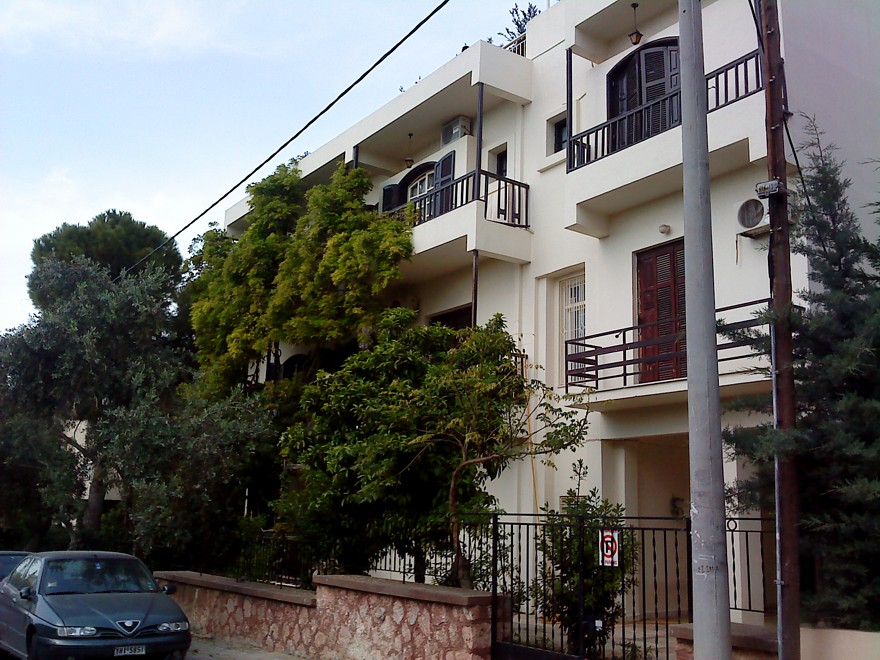
Architecture of Papagou.

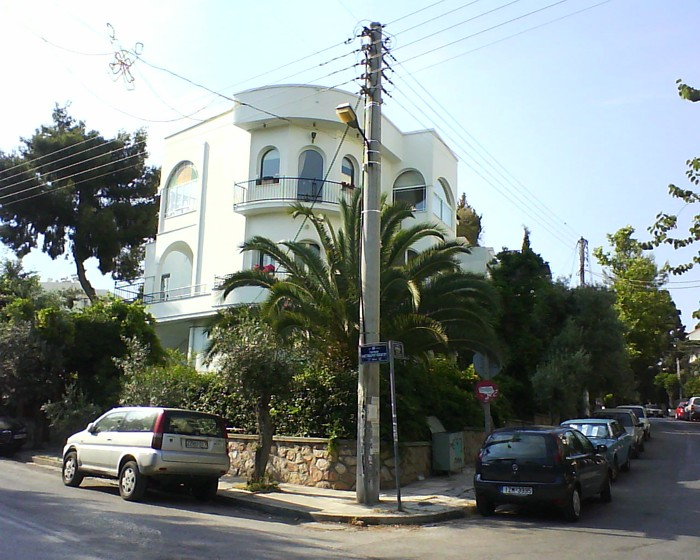
Neighbourhood

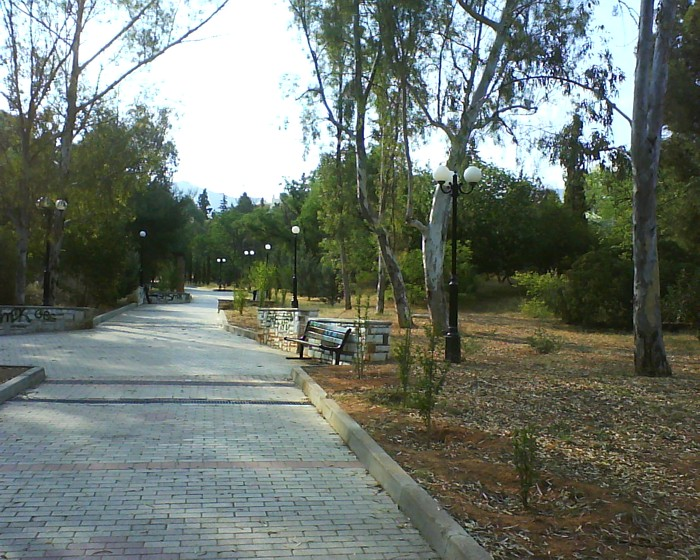
Local park.

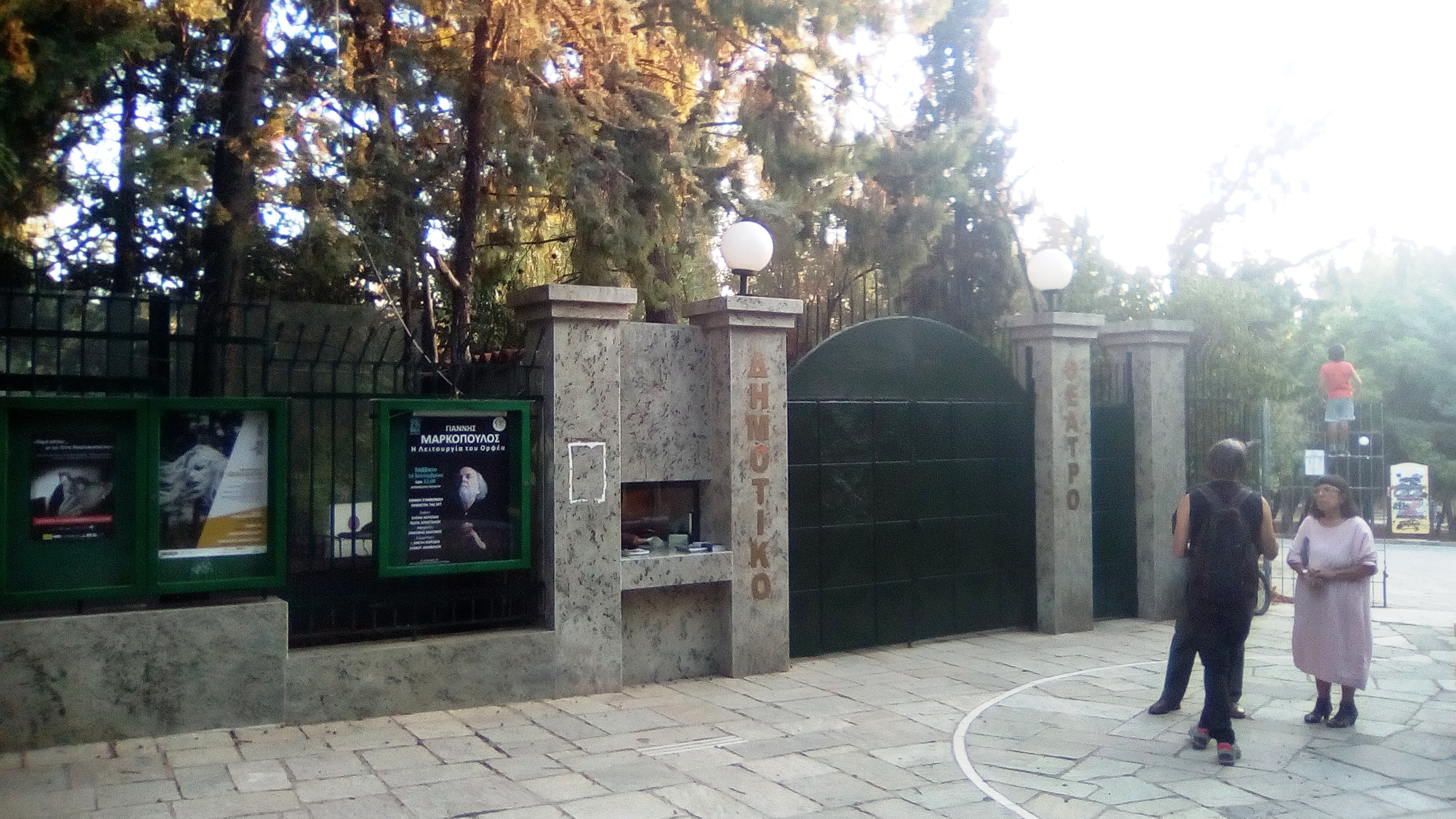
Municipal Theatre of Papagou.

== See also ==
- List of municipalities of Attica
