= Vari-Voula-Vouliagmeni =

Vari-Voula-Vouliagmeni Βάρη-Βούλα-Βουλιαγμένη
- Municipality
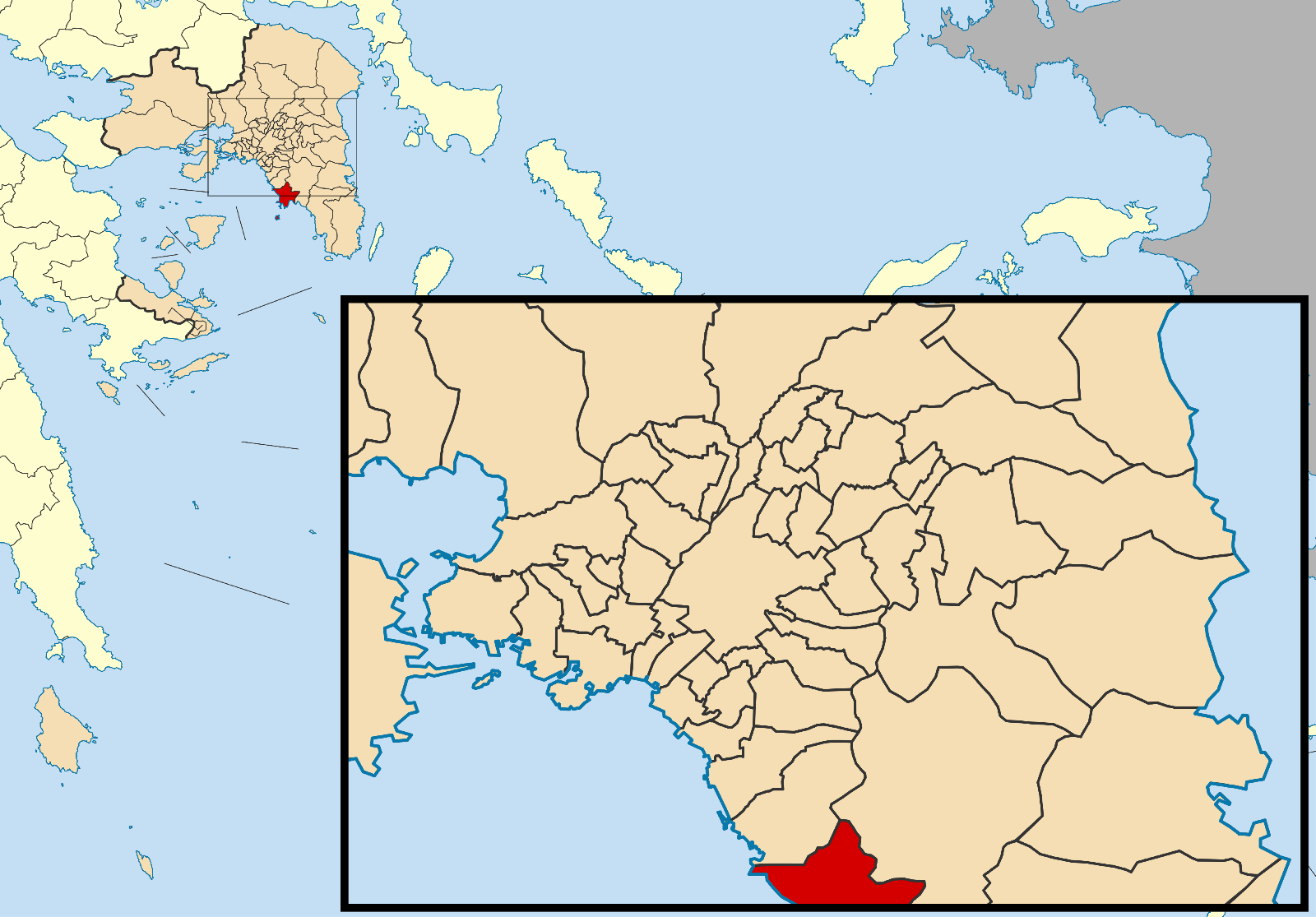

- Location within Greece
- Coordinates: 37°51′N 23°45′E
- Country: Greece
- Administrative region: Attica
- Regional unit: East Attica

Government
  - Mayor: Grigoris Konstantellos (since 2014)

Area
  - Municipality: 37.225 km^{2} (14.373 sq mi)

Population (2021)
  - Municipality: 52,546
  - Density: 1,411.6/km^{2} (3,656.0/sq mi)
- Time zone: UTC+2 (EET)
  - Summer (DST): UTC+3 (EEST)
- Website: http://www.vvv.gov.gr

Vari-Voula-Vouliagmeni (Greek: Βάρη-Βούλα-Βουλιαγμένη) is a municipality in the East Attica regional unit of Attica, Greece. The seat of the municipality is Voula. The municipality has an area of 10,450 km^{2}. The municipal unit has an area of 37,225 km^{2}. It is part of Athens urban area, forming part of its southern suburbs and contains some of the area's most famous beaches and some of the most expensive real estate in Greece. Grigoris Konstantellos is the incumbent mayor, elected for a third term in October 2023.

== Formation ==
The municipality was formed at the 2011 local government reform known as the Kallikratis Plan, by the merger of the following three municipalities that became municipal units:

- Vari
- Voula
- Vouliagmeni
