= Highways in Greece =

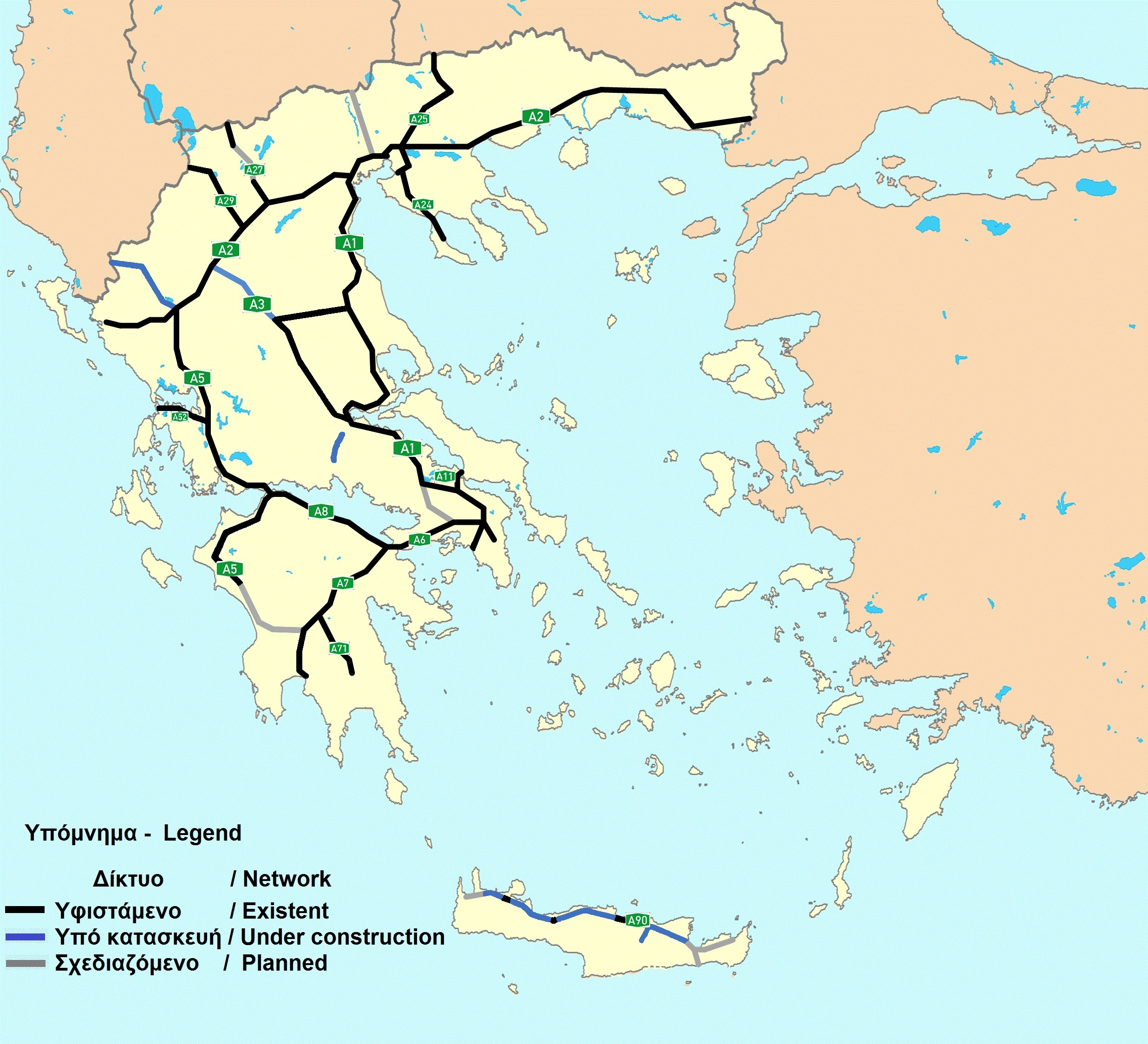
Map of Greece's motorway network as of September 2026

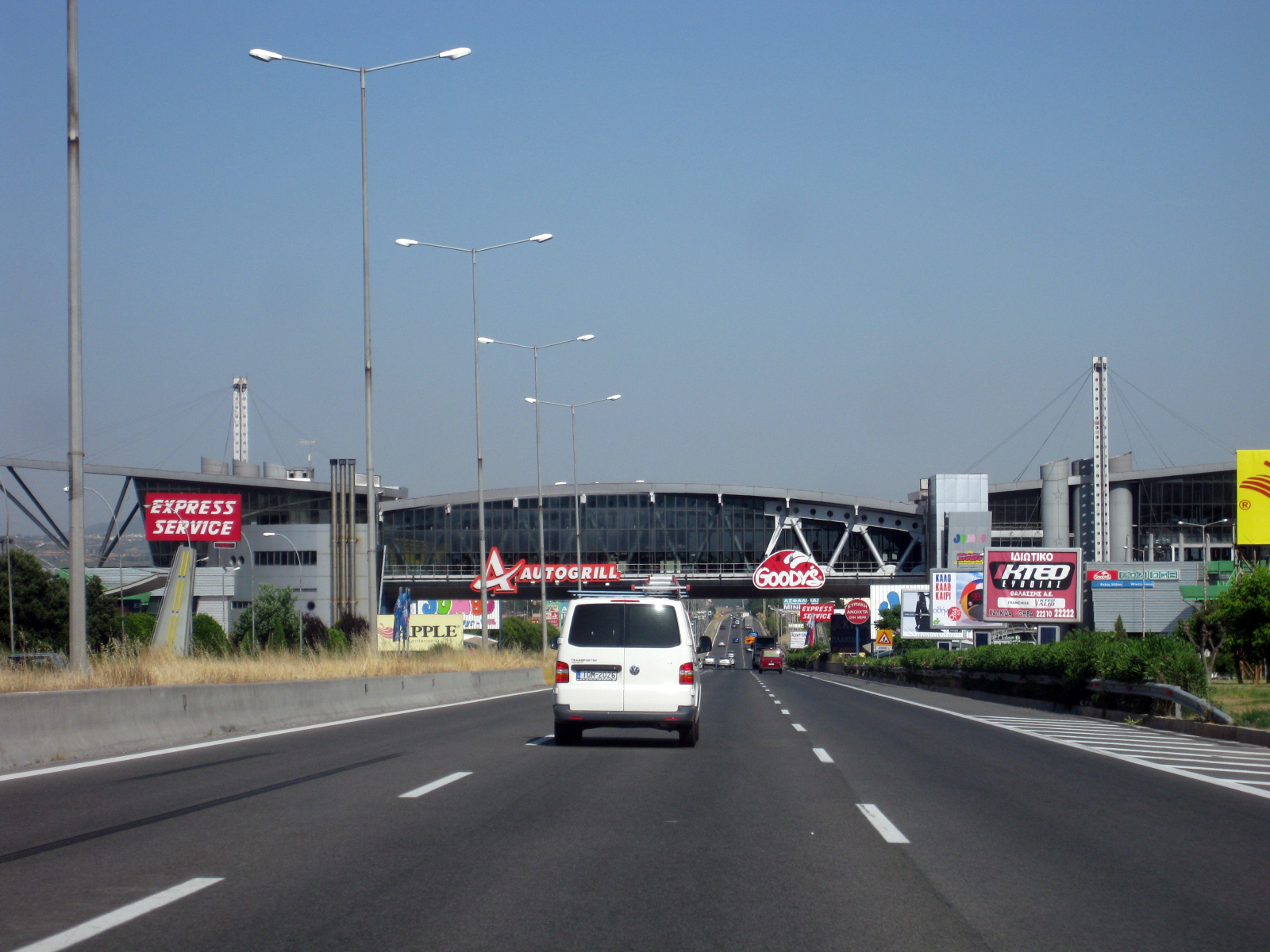
Sirius rest area along Motorway 1 (A1) near Athens, Greece with a restaurant above the road

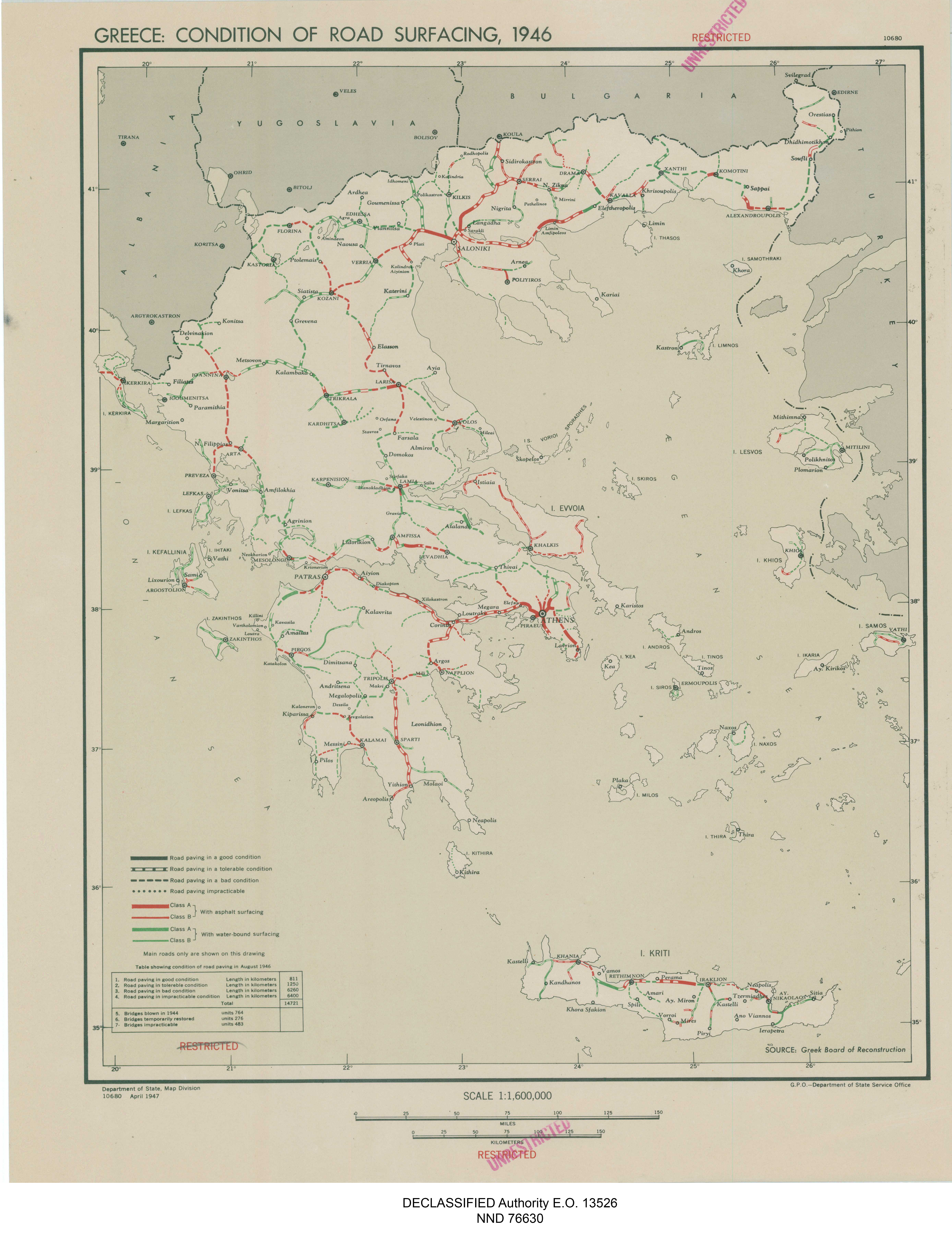
Roads as of 1946

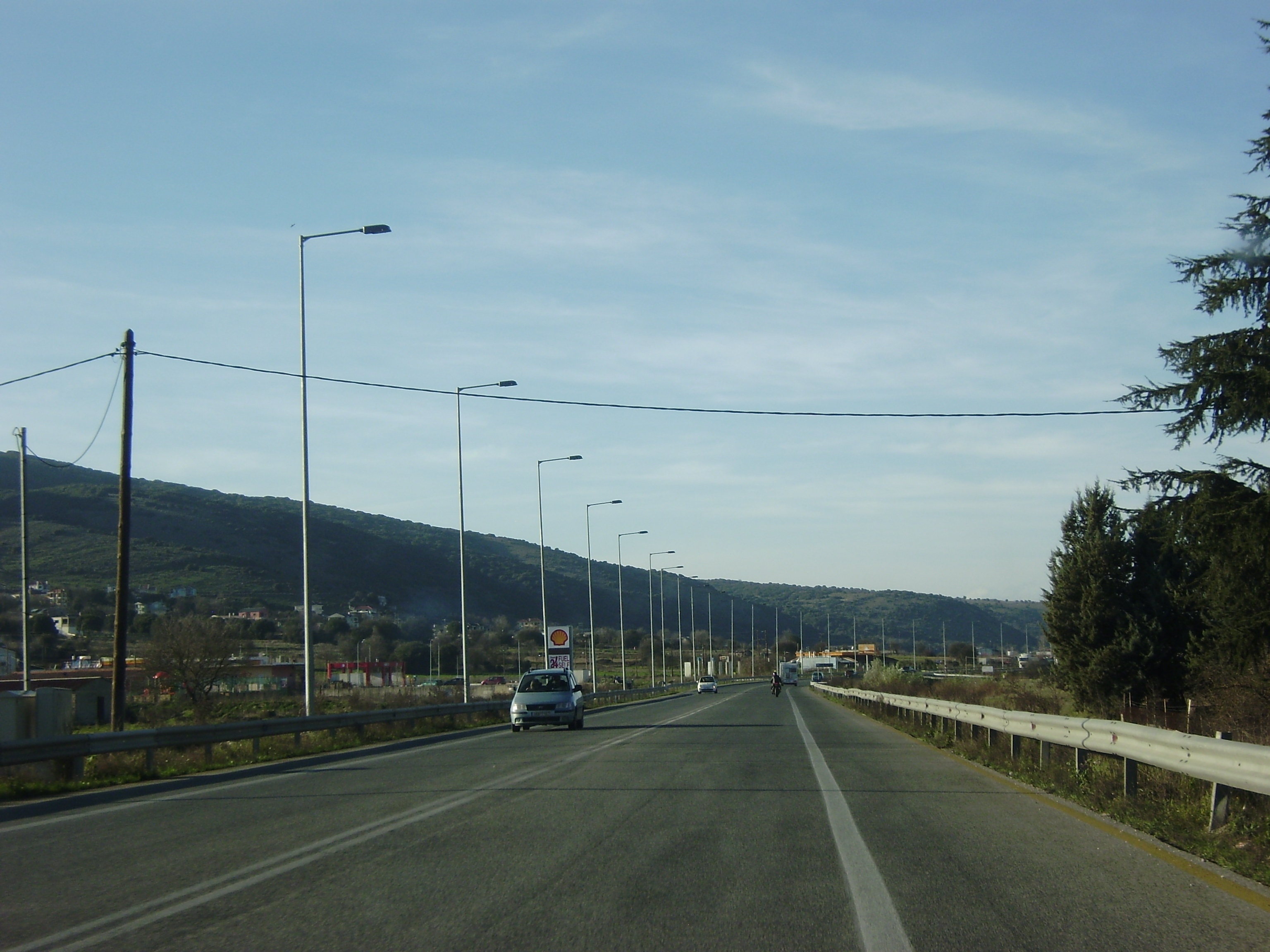
A typical national road in Greece

Motorways and National Roads in Greece constitute the main road network of the country. These two types of roads are distinct in terms of their construction and capacity specifications. Their main differences are that motorways (Greek: Αυτοκινητόδρομος, Aftokinitódromos) adhere to higher quality construction standards, allowing for higher sustained speeds and increased traffic compared to national roads (Greek: Εθνική Οδός, Ethnikí Odós). Expressways denote a specific highway standard intermediate between motorways and national roads, and can be designated as either.

The construction of the Greek motorway network has been, to a large extent, a very complex and demanding project due to the peculiarities of the geomorphology of the areas through which the new roads pass. The Greek mainland is extremely mountainous; the local topography as well as environmental concerns regarding the local flora and fauna played a decisive role in the final route design.

In order to overcome these difficulties, the construction of multiple large and expensive technical works, such as tunnels and bridges, was necessary in many cases. Indicatively, the total number of tunnels built along the six Greek major motorways (A1, A2, A3, A5, A7 and A8) is about 150 and their total length is about 200 km (measured as a single bore).

With a total length of about 2,528 km as of 2025, Greece's motorway network is the largest in Southeastern Europe and one of the most advanced in Europe.

== Specifications and designations ==
Expressway sign in Greece

Motorways and national roads follow distinct naming conventions. All motorways are named by using the capital letter "A", while National Roads are named by using the capital letters "EO", in both cases followed by a number. The main motorways of Greece have a single-digit number and auxiliary motorways branching off from the main ones have a double or triple-digit number (e.g. A25 or A621). Motorways are typically, but not always, assigned the same numbers as the national roads they superseded. For example, "A2" refers to the Egnatia Odos (Motorway 2), while "EO2" refers to National Road 2. Motorways have exclusively green signage, while National Roads typically have blue signage.

=== Motorways ===
A typical motorway (highway) in Greece consists of 2 or 3 lanes plus an emergency lane in each direction (for a total of 4-6 lanes), separated by a central reservation, with gentle curves and grades. Entrances and exits to the motorways are only provided at grade-separated junctions (interchanges) and there are no traffic lights. The highest speed limit on motorways is 130 km/h, and they are the only toll roads in Greece (with the sole exception of the non-motorway Aktio–Preveza Undersea Tunnel). Greek motorways are generally organized so that the odd-numbered motorways are of north-south alignment and the even-numbered motorways are of east-west alignment. However, there are exceptions.

=== National roads ===
A typical national road in Greece is a single carriageway or limited-access road (following upgrades) with at-grade intersections and with one or two traffic lanes for each direction, often with a paved verge (but not an emergency lane) on each side as well. Traditional, unupgraded sections have little to no segregation from other non-highway roads. The highest speed limit on national roads is 90 km/h. National roads are the only main roads in Greece that allow slow-moving and non-motor traffic (e.g. tractors, bicycles).

=== Expressways ===
Expressway (Greek: Οδός Ταχείας Κυκλοφορίας, Odós Tachías Kykloforías, lit: "rapid-traffic roads") is the third common term used for road categorization in Greece. It is not an official standalone category, but rather a descriptor for a specific standard of highway construction, equivalent to a limited-access road. A typical expressway has 2 lanes in each direction, plus a paved verge (but not an emergency lane) with a central barrier, providing less separation than a motorway. Modern expressways are typically dual carriageways with grade separation, but in older cases can also be widened single carriageways with at-grade intersections. Most highly-trafficked sections of national roads have been upgraded to expressways, retaining their original designation, while certain roads constructed directly to expressway standards have been designated as motorways. The highest speed limit on expressways is 110 km/h.

== List of motorways ==
Motorway sign in Greece

Greece's motorway network has been extensively modernized throughout the 1990s and 2000s and part of it is still under construction. Most of it was completed by early 2017. There are a total of 8 main routes throughout the Greek mainland and Crete, from which some feature numerous branches/auxiliary routes, as described in the listing below.

=== Greek motorways per governmental decree (2015) ===
Name	Connecting cities and towns	Progress	Notes
Athens–Thessaloniki–Evzonoi	Piraeus, Athens, Thebes, Lamia, Larissa, Katerini, Thessaloniki (via A2), Evzonoi	505/550 km 313/342 mi	Chalastra–Polykastro section is under construction.
Egnatia Odos Motorway	Igoumenitsa, Ioannina, Grevena, Veria, Thessaloniki, Kavala, Xanthi, Komotini, Alexandroupoli	670/670 km 416/416 mi	Completed
Central Greece Motorway	Lamia, Karditsa, Trikala, Kalabaka, Grevena	181/181 km 112/112 mi	Completed
Ionia Odos Motorway	Tsakona, Pyrgos, Patras, Rio, Missolonghi, Amfilochia, Arta, Ioannina, Kakavia	295/424 km 183/263 mi	Ioannina–Kalpaki section is under construction
Ionia Odos Motorway	Tsakona, Pyrgos, Patras, Rio, Missolonghi, Amfilochia, Arta, Ioannina, Kakavia	295/424 km 183/263 mi	Kalpaki–Kakavia and Pyrgos–Tsakona sections are under planning
Attiki Odos Motorway	Elefsina, Athens, Pallini, Markopoulo	48/48 km 30/30 mi	Completed
Morea Motorway	Corinth, Tripoli, Megalopolis, Kalamata	155/55 km 96/96 mi	Completed
Olympia Odos Motorway	Athens, Elefsina, Corinth, Aigio, Rio, Patras	180/180 km 111/111 mi	Completed
Schimatari–Chalcis	Schimatari, Chalcis, Psachna	11/26 km 7/16 mi	Chalcis Bypass is under construction
Velestino–Volos	Velestino, Volos	13/13 km 8/8 mi	Completed Operates with expressway standards
Elefsina–Oinofyta	Elefsina, Oinofyta	0/40 km 0/25 mi	Under planning
Thessaloniki–Chalkidiki	Thessaloniki, Nea Moudania, Kassandreia	93/93 km 58/58 mi	Operates with expressway standards Thessaloniki Eastern Ring Road upgrade under construction
Raidestos–Thessaloniki Airport	Nea Raidestos, Thessaloniki Airport	3/3 km 2/2 mi	Completed Operates with expressway standards and level interchanges
Thessaloniki–Serres–Promachonas	Thessaloniki, Serres, Sidirokastro, Promachonas	105/105 km 62/62 mi	Completed
Kozani–Ptolemaida–Niki	Kozani, Ptolemaida, Florina, Niki	40/79 km 25/49 mi	Ptolemaida–Florina section under planning
Siatista–Kastoria–Ieropigi–Krystallopigi	Siatista, Kastoria, Krystallopigi	72/72 km 45/45 mi	Completed
Amvrakia Odos Motorway	Vonitsa, Aktio, Preveza	48/48 km 30/30 mi	Completed
Markopoulo–Lavrio	Markopoulo, Keratea, Lavrio	0/28 km 0/17 mi	Under planning
Hymettus Ring Road	Ilioupoli, Agia Paraskevi, Pallini, Rafina	13.5/30 km 8.4/19 mi	Pikermi–Rafina section and Ilioupoli Tunnel under planning
Vrilissia–Agia Paraskevi	Vrilissia, Agia Paraskevi	2/2 km 1/1 mi	Completed
Koropi–Athens Airport	Koropi, Athens International Airport	6/6 km 4/4 mi	Completed
Aigaleo Ring Road	Skaramagas, Ano Liosia	9/11 km 6/7 mi	Skaramagas interchange under planning
Lefktro–Sparta	Megalopolis, Sparta	45.5/45.5 km 28/28 mi	Completed
Northern Crete Motorway	Chania, Rethymno, Heraklion, New Heraklion Airport, Agios Nikolaos, Sitia, Ierapetra	41/310 km 25/193 mi	Upgrade of the Chania–Agios Nikolaos section to motorway standards and the New Heraklion Airport branch under construction
Northern Crete Motorway	Chania, Rethymno, Heraklion, New Heraklion Airport, Agios Nikolaos, Sitia, Ierapetra	41/310 km 25/193 mi	Upgrade of the Kissamos–Chania andAgios Nikolaos–Sitia sections to motorway standards, and the Ierapetra branch under planning

=== A1 (Athens–Thessaloniki–Evzonoi) ===
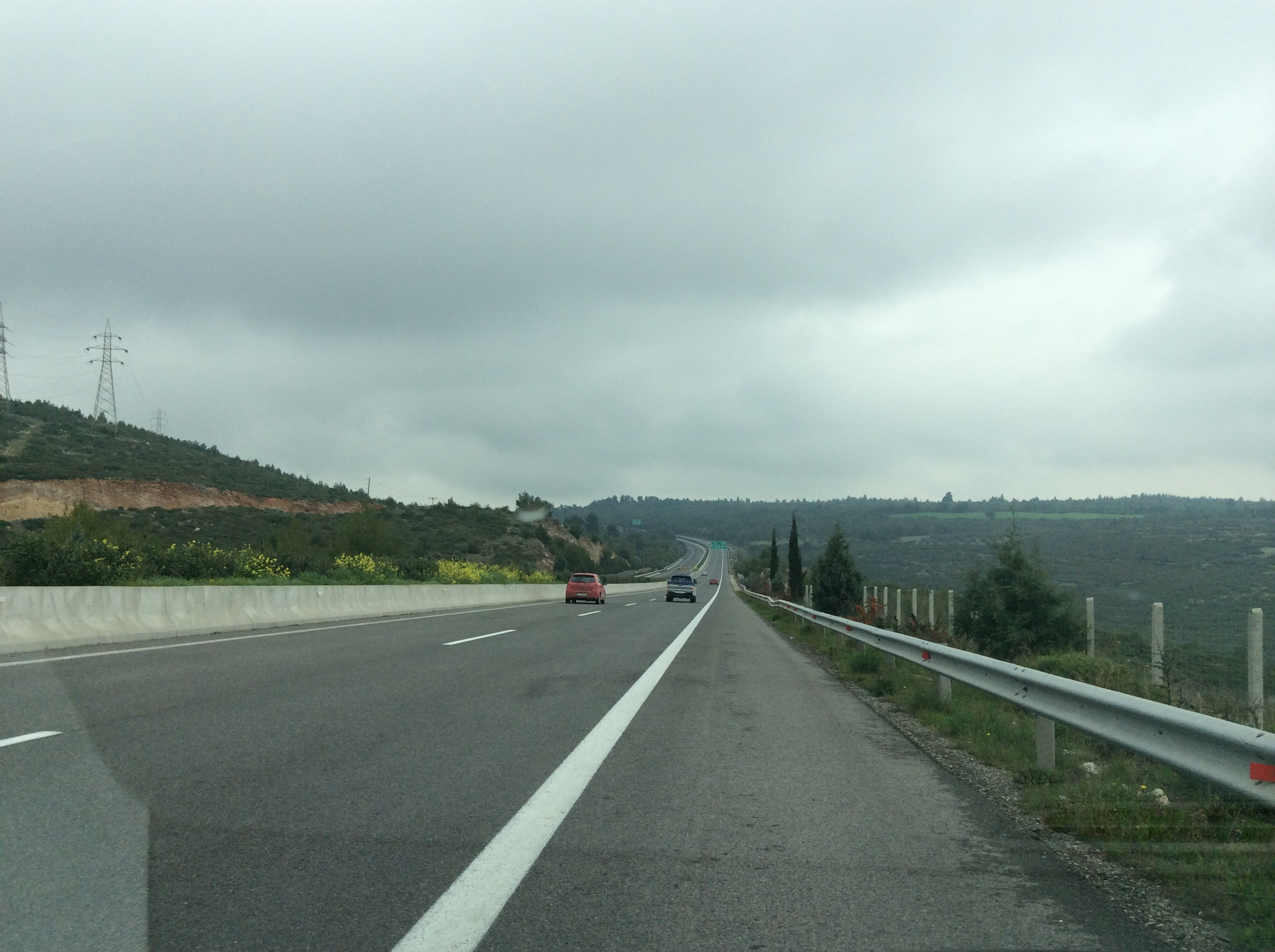
Motorway A1

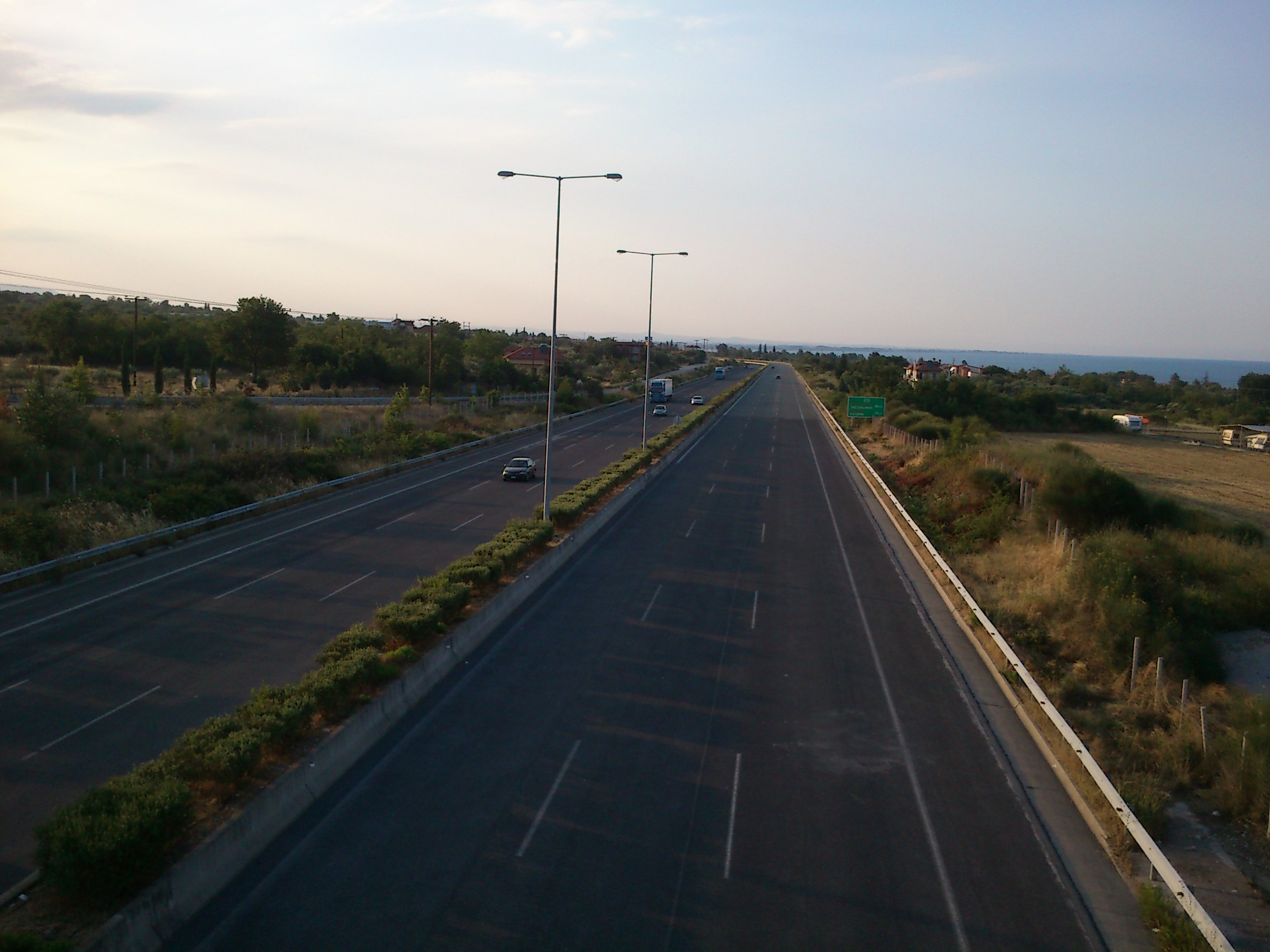
Motorway A1 near Katerini, Greece

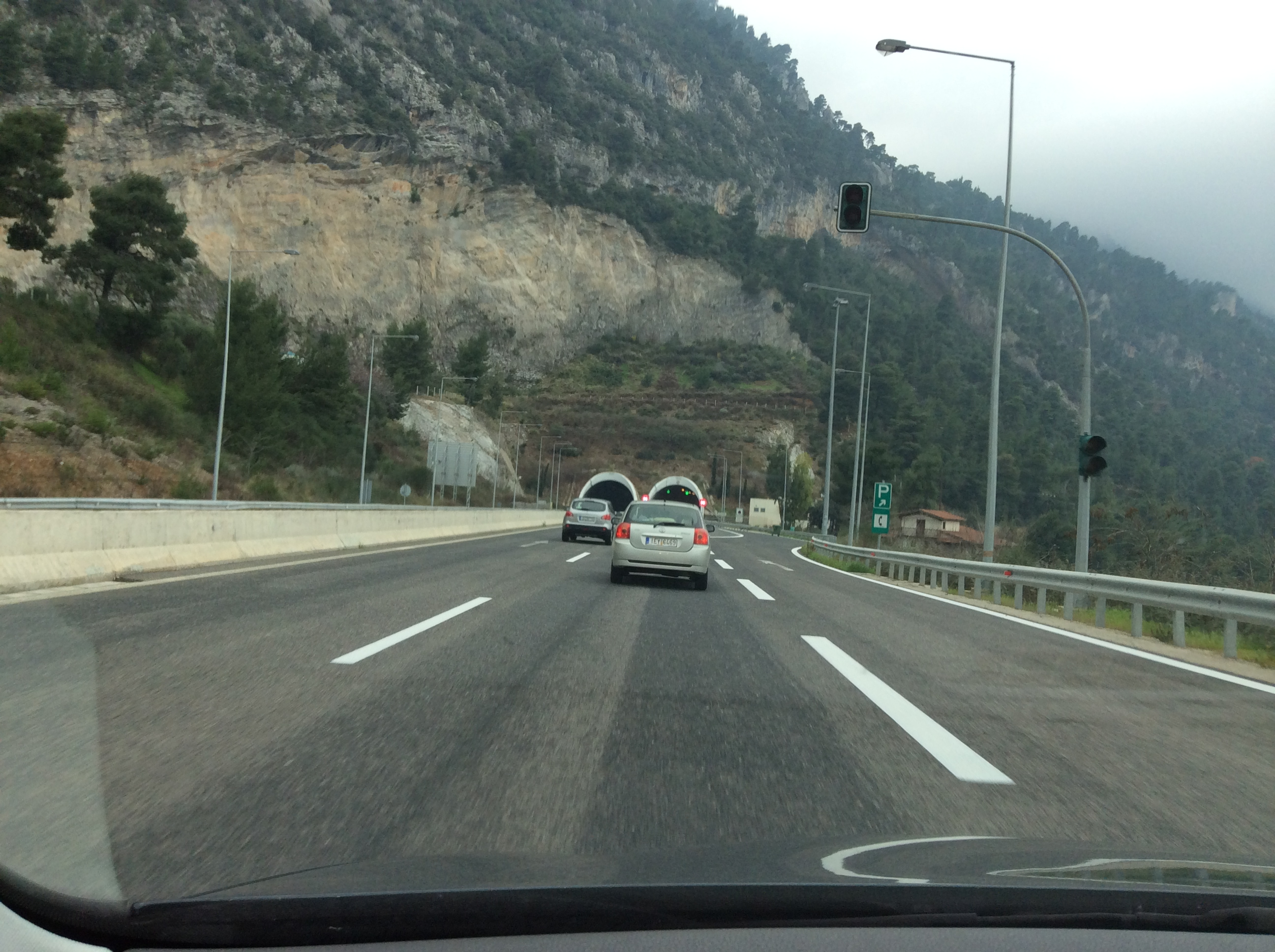
Motorway A1 near Agios Konstantinos

The A1 motorway, also known as the Athens–Thessaloniki Motorway, is the oldest and most important motorway of Greece, connecting the country's largest cities, Athens and Thessaloniki and passing through many important regions of Greece on a south-north direction. Its southern end is at the Faliro seafront in Piraeus, and its northern at the Evzonoi border crossing with North Macedonia. The final uncompleted section, from Chalastra to Polykastro (which remains only up to expressway standards), is under reconstruction to full motorway standards.

The full length of this motorway is around 550 km or 342 miles, including 14 km or 8.7 miles of shared route with the A2 (Egnatia Odos).

- The A11 motorway is a branch of the A1, connecting it with the city of Chalcis, currently being extended as a bypass around it.
- The A12 motorway is a branch of the A1, connecting it with the city of Volos. It is built to expressway standards only.
- The A13 motorway is a planned branch of the A1, from Oinofyta to Elefsina; connecting it with the A6 (Attiki Odos) at Magoula and serving as a western bypass of Athens Metropolitan Area. Originally, it was planned to begin from Thebes.

=== A2 (Egnatia Odos) ===
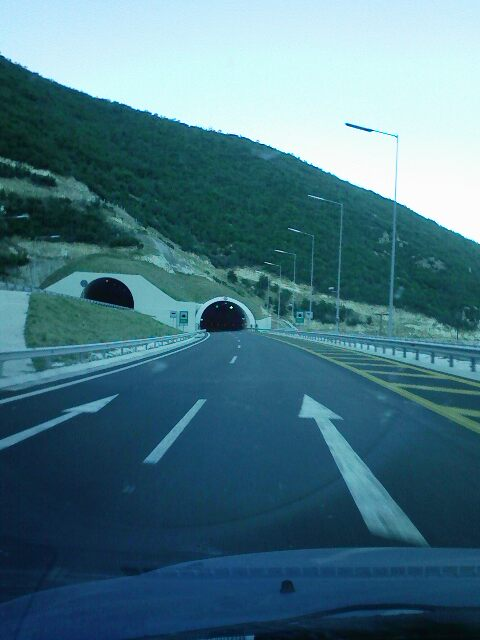
A2 Motorway Tunnels between Kozani and Veria.

The A2 motorway, also called Egnatia Odos (Egnatia Motorway), is a motorway situated in northern Greece, connecting several major cities on the way. It starts at the port of Igoumenitsa and ends at the Kipoi border crossing with Turkey. It is the longest motorway in Greece.

Part of its length, a section of about 360 km (220 mi) from Evros to Thessaloniki, parallels the ancient Roman Via Egnatia, which ran from modern Durrës in Albania to Thessaloniki and thence to Byzantium (now Istanbul, Turkey). The project has therefore officially adopted the Greek name of the Via Egnatia (Egnatia Odos / Εγνατία Οδός). However, the parallel is not exact; the original Via Egnatia was much longer (1,120 km / 696 miles) and its western section, from Thessaloniki to the Adriatic Sea, ran much further north than the modern road.

There are auxiliary routes to Albania and Bulgaria, with the main route leading to Turkey. North Macedonia is accessed through the A1 (AThE), as described above, or via the A27 (see below). Some of these auxiliary routes are not yet fully motorways, but typical 2-lane national roads, although they are of considerably higher quality than other similar roads in the rest of Greece. The project (including most of the auxiliary routes), was completed in 2009, with the length of the main route being 670 kilometers or 416 miles, making it the longest motorway in Greece.

- The A24 motorway is a branch of the A2, referred to as the Thessaloniki–Nea Moudania Motorway or Chalkidiki Motorway, connecting Thessaloniki with Nea Moudania and further to Kassandreia, on the Chalkidiki peninsula. As it passes through the eastern periphery of Thessaloniki the A24 becomes part of the Thessaloniki Inner Ring Road (Greek: Εσωτερική Περιφερειακή Οδός, Esoterikí Periferiakí Odós). It is built to expessway standards only (and as such is toll-free), though its ring road section is being upgraded to add a second level ("flyover"), built to motorway standards.
  - The A242 motorway is a branch of the A24, referred to as the Raidestos–Macedonia Airport Motorway, which acts a short spur connecting the route of the A24 at Nea Raidestos, Thermi with Thessaloniki Airport. It is built to expressway standards (and as such is toll-free), additionally containing an at-grade intersection with traffic lights.
- The A25 motorway is a branch of the A2, referred to as the Thessaloniki–Serres–Promachonas Motorway, connecting Thessaloniki with Serres and the Promachonas border crossing with Bulgaria (taking over parts of the EO12).
- The A27 motorway is a partially complete motorway and branch of the A2, referred to as the Kozani–Ptolemaida–Niki Motorway, connecting Kozani, Ptolemaida and Florina with the Niki border crossing with North Macedonia. During 2012, tenders were announced for the construction of the 14 kilometers section from Florina to Niki. Construction of this section started in 2013, finished in 2015 and it was opened to traffic on 20 May 2016. The Ptolemaida - Florina part is currently an expressway (single carriageway), planned to be upgraded to motorway standards.
- The A29 motorway is a branch of the A2, referred to as the Siatista–Kastoria–Ieropigi–Krystallopigi Motorway, connecting Siatista and Kastoria with the Krystallopigi border crossing with Albania.

=== A3 (Central Greece Motorway) ===
The A3 motorway, or the Central Greece Motorway (usually referred to as just E65) is a motorway in Central Greece and Thessaly, connecting the A1 near Lamia with the A2 near Grevena, and serving multiple cities and towns along western Thessaly. Its total length is 181 kilometres (112 mi).

Construction began in 2009, lasted 2 years and stopped in 2011 due to the Greek financial crisis. At the end of 2013 it was decided to proceed with the immediate construction of the central middle section, Trikala–Xyniada with a length of 80 km, while construction of the northern (Grevena–Trikala) and southern (Xyniada–Lamia) sections was postponed.

The middle section between Xyniada and Trikala was the first to be inaugurated, opening to traffic on 22 December 2017.The highway continued opening in stages, until the final section, between Kalabaka and Grevena opened on 23 July 2026.

=== A5 (Ionia Odos) ===
The A5 motorway, also referred to as the Ionia Odos (Ionian Motorway), is a motorway situated in western Greece, connecting Ioannina and the A2 with several cities, most importantly Patras, before terminating at Pyrgos. On its route, it crosses the Corinthian Gulf via the Rio–Antirrio Bridge, where it connects to the A8 at Rio. The first half of the northern extension, from Ioannina to Kalpaki is under construction, while the second half to the Kakavia border crossing with Albania, alongside the southern extension to meet with the A7, are in the planning stages.

The route spans most of the west coast of Greece, along the Ionian Sea, hence its name "Ionia Odos". Work on the majority of the highway began in spring 2006 and was planned to be completed by 2012. Due to the effects of the Greek financial crisis, all construction works were halted in 2011, but restarted in 2013. The Antirrio–Ioannina section was inaugurated on 5 September 2017, and the Patras–Pyrgos sections (past the Patras bypass) was opened on 4 December 2025.

- The A52 motorway, also known as Amvrakia Odos (Ambracian Motorway) is a branch of the A5, connecting it with the island of Lefkada and the Aktio Undersea Tunnel, leading to Preveza. This motorway section serves the popular tourist region around the Ambracian Gulf. At 48.6 km (30.2 mi) long, the motorway was expected to finish in 2012, having started construction in 2009. Earthworks were largely completed by April 2012 but structures had not commenced as of that time. In mid-2013, works had begun again, but as of December 2016, problems with funding have kept the road largely behind schedule. The 15 km (9.3 mi) section from the Aktio–Preveza tunnel to Vonitsa and the 17 km (11 mi) section from Ionia Odos to Loutraki (also known as Amfilochia bypass), have been opened to traffic in 2019 and 2022 respectively. The final 16 km (9.9 mi) section from Loutraki to Vonitsa was completed and opened to traffic in 2024. Unlike the A5, the A52 is fully toll-free.

=== A6 (Attiki Odos) ===
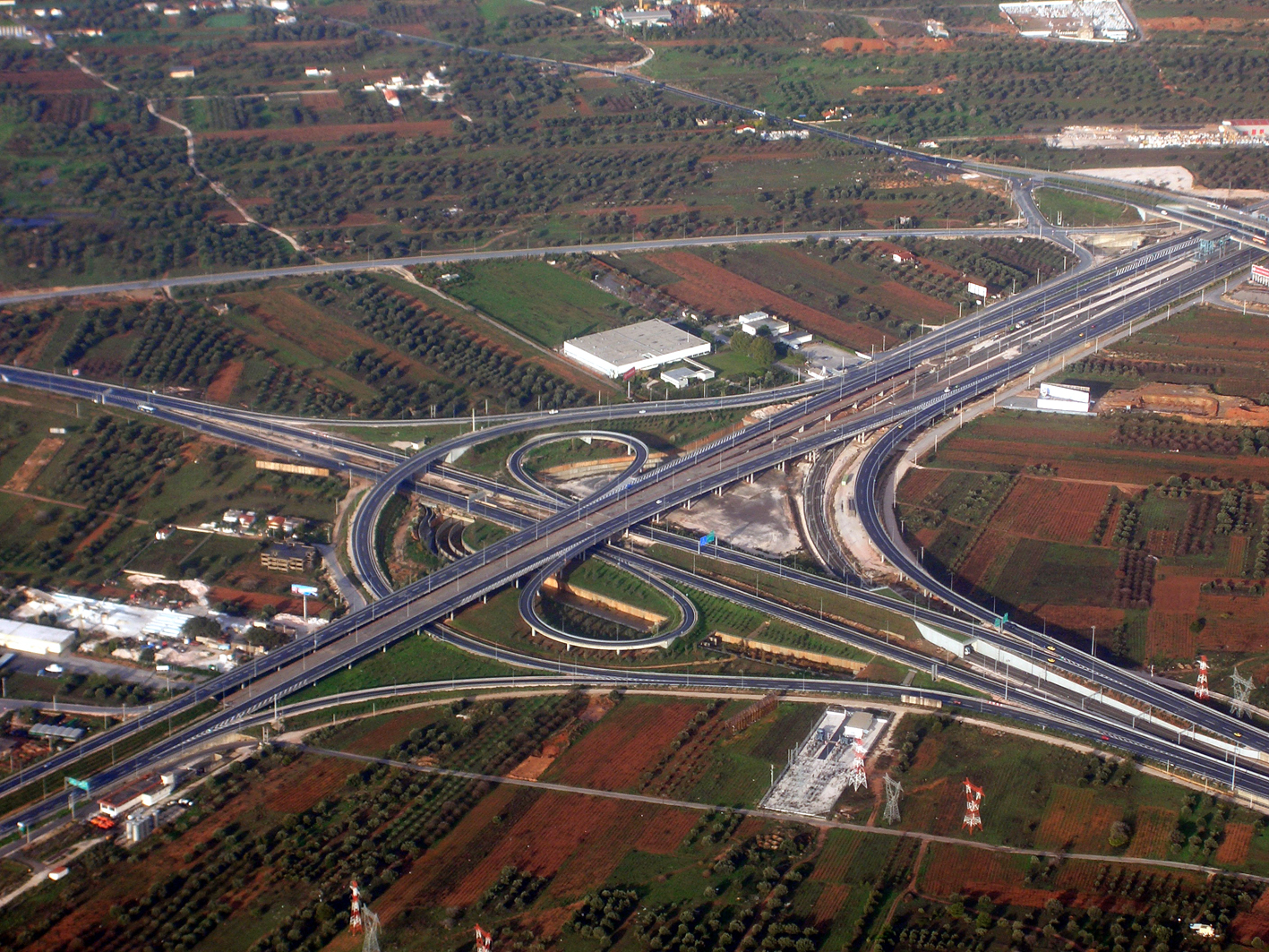
Interchange at the Attiki Odos Airport entrance

The A6 motorway is the main route of the Attiki Odos system, which forms the urban motorway and ring road network of the Athens metropolitan area. Its full length is 65 kilometres (40 mi) and it is also planned to be extended to various directions, bringing its total length to 141 km (88 mi). The Attiki Odos has various auxiliary routes, serving parts of the Athens suburbs and the wider Attica region, including Athens International Airport.

- The A62 motorway is a section of the Attiki Odos and a branch of the main A6 route. It is referred to as the Hymettus Ring Road (Greek: Περιφερειακή Υμηττού, Periferiakí Ymittoú), serving parts of eastern Athens, while it is also expected to be extended further southwards to connect with Vouliagmenis Avenue, and further eastwards towards Rafina.
  - The A621 motorway is a short tertiary branch of Attiki Odos, which is the western connection the A6 and the Hymettus Ring Road. It serves as a minor auxiliary of the main route and its length is 2 km (1.2 mi).
- The A64 motorway is a section of the Attiki Odos and a branch of the main A6 route. It serves as a corridor from the main route and Koropi towards Athens International Airport.
- The A65 motorway is a section of the Attiki Odos and a branch of the main A6 route. It is referred to as the Aigaleo Ring Road (Greek: Περιφερειακή Αιγάλεω, Periferiakí Egáleo) and serves parts of western Athens and the adjacent Thriasio plain. A small section of the A65, the Skaramagas interchange, remains unfinished, with completion expected by 2028.

Unlike the rest of the network, the A64 and A65 are both fully toll-free.

=== A7 (Morea Motorway) ===
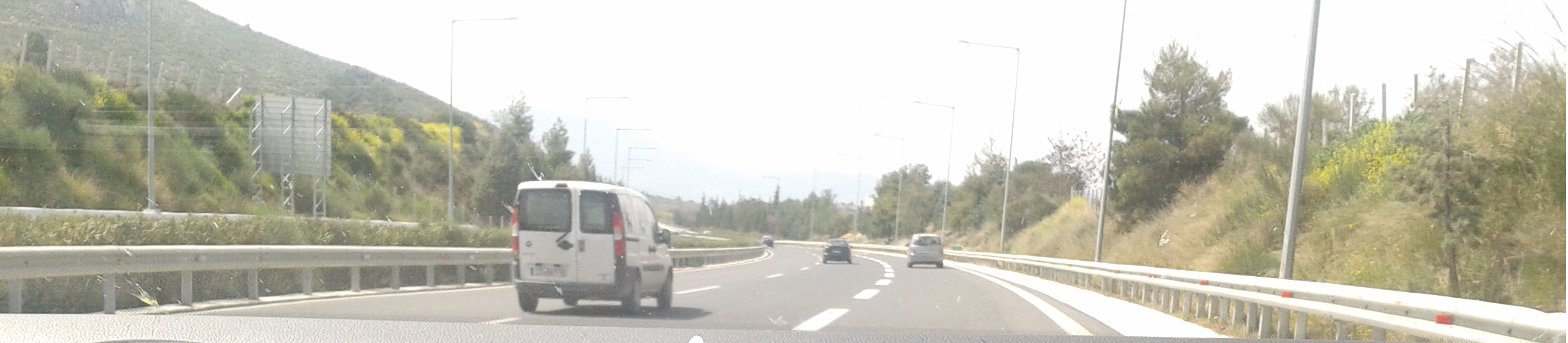
Motorway A7

The A7 motorway, also referred to as the Morea Motorway or the Central Peloponnese Motorway, is a motorway in the Peloponnese, connecting Corinth and the A8 with Tripoli and Kalamata. It replaced the old EO7 as the main road, with the section between Corinth and Tripoli, originally constructed between 1984 and 1990 as an expressway and officially becoming part of the Greek road network in 1992.

The A7 has recently undergone extensive improvement to full motorway standards. As of December 2016, the motorway section between Corinth and Kalamata is fully constructed and operational. Its total length is 155 kilometers (96 miles).

- The A71 motorway, also referred to as the Lefktro–Sparta Motorway, is a branch of the A7, connecting Lefktro near Megalopolis with Sparta. It was opened on 18 April 2016.

=== A8 (Olympia Odos) ===
The A8 motorway, also known as the Olympia Odos, is the motorway from Athens to Pyrgos. It begins in Elefsina, at the interchange with the A6 (Attiki Odos) and continues to the A5 (Ionia Odos) interchange near Patras. The Patras - Pyrgos section opened in July 2025. The motorway will in future be extended to Tsakona (near Meligalas) where it will intersect with the A7 (Moreas).

The Elefsina–Corinth section was completed to motorway standards in 2006, while the Corinth–Patras section was completed in 2017, after having begun construction in 2008 with completion due in 2012. It includes the widening and general reconstruction of the now former EO8a along with some new tunnels and bridges.

=== A90 (Northern Crete Motorway) ===
The A90 motorway, also referred to as the North Road Axis of Crete (Greek: Βόρειος Οδικός Άξονας Κρήτης, BOAK), is a motorway under construction in Crete. It is Greece's only motorway not located on the mainland. Certain small sections have already been completed, specifically the bypasses of Heraklion, Rethymno and Chania (2007). In late 2014, the Agios Nikolaos bypass was opened to traffic with expressway standards. Its full length will be 310 kilometres or 193 miles from Sitia in the east to Kissamos in the west, and it is expected to be completed by the year 2031.

=== Electronic toll system and interoperability ===
On April 4, 2018, an international invitation to tender was launched by the Greek government for the procurement, design and installation of a satellite and electronic toll system (e-tolls) in the Greek motorways, using automatic number plate recognition (ANPR) and GNSS technologies. The new system would be the first distance-based pricing model in Greece, replacing the existing toll plazas and charging vehicles depending on the distance covered in the entirety of the country’s motorway network (including the currently state-owned Egnatia Odos).The project's cost was estimated at about €400 million.

The system would be double; Passenger vehicles' license plates would automatically be captured and identified by traffic cameras upon their entrance and exit from the tolled motorway network with the use of ANPR technology, while professional and heavy vehicles would all carry transponders which would monitor and record their position using satellites (GNSS technology). Five consortia participated in the tender, namely Aκtor–Intrakat–Intrasoft International SA–Autostrade Tech S.p.A., Mytilineos–Nusz, Terna–Vinci–Kapsch TrafficCom, OTE–T-Systems International GmbH and STRABAG–SkyToll. In May 2019, the second phase of the tender was completed and two consortia passed, Aκtor SA – Intrakat – Intrasoft Int’l SA- Autostrade Tech S.p.A. and Mytilineos – Nusz. Finally, a week before the 2019 parliamentary election, the then Minister for Infrastructure, Transport and Networks Christos Spirtzis awarded the concession to the consortium of Aκtor–Intrakat–Intrasoft International SA–Autostrade Tech S.p.A., after evaluation of the financial offers.

==== Cancellation of the first tender ====
Although the tender for the new system had been strongly disputed by the contestants themselves, then Minister Spirtzis decided to proceed with it. The concerns regarded the subject of the tender itself, as such a wide implementation does not exist in any developed country, as well as the absence of an agreement for the implementation of such a system. Moreover, existing concession agreements with the private companies managing most of the Greek motorways would have to be amended.

In the autumn of 2019, the tender for the electronic toll system was struck down by the Council of State following the discovery of several deficiencies and an appeal by the Mytilineos–Nusz consortium, second bidder of the tender, and other participants regarding the bid evaluation procedure, noting that its bid was not preferred although it was lower by €70 million. The tender was officially cancelled at the end of May 2020.

==== Interoperability ====
In March 2011, five (Attiki Odos SA, Aegean Motorway SA, Olympia Odos SA, Moreas SA, Gefyra SA) of the total of seven operating concessionaires of the Greek motorways are part of an interoperable network named "GRITS" (Greek Interoperable Toll Service), which allows drivers to travel along the participating motorways, passing from the electronic toll lanes, using any company's transponder.

In October 2019, it was agreed that the remaining two concessionaires (Nea Odos SA and Kentriki Odos SA), as well as the then state-owned Egnatia Odos SA, would join the GRITS network. Drivers will therefore be able to travel and pay tolls electronically using a single transponder across the entire Greek motorway network. In the autumn of 2019 technical discussions began between all the companies, testing of the system began in the summer of 2020 and it is expected to become operational in the autumn of 2020.

== Provincial roads ==
Provincial roads (Greek: Επαρχιακή Οδός, Eparchiakí Odós) are all-purpose regional and local roads that are less important than a motorway or national road, though they may occasionally share a route with a national road. They were created on 6 February 1956, and are under the responsibility the regional units of Greece (formerly prefectures), at whose level they are numbered. However they are almost always referred to by the principal settlements they connect (e.g. Επαρχιακή Οδός Άργους–Νέας Κίου, "Argos–Nea Kios Provincial Road"). The layout of the provincial road network also varies a lot, ranging from fast multi-lane dual carriageways (expressway standards) to unpaved dirts or gravel roads, though the vast majority are regular two-lane rural roads. Provincial road numbers are used for documentation and statistical purposes only, and do not appear on road signage in Greece.

== Future sections ==
As of 2026, the following motorway sections are under construction:

- The A1 motorway from Chalastra to Polykastro.
- The A11 motorway from Chalcis to Psachna.
- The A5 motorway from Ioannina to Kalpaki.
- The A90 motorway from Chania to Agios Nikolaos.

== Correlation with European routes ==
This is a list of European routes in Greece. When certain highways that carry European routes are replaced with motorways, the European routes will normally be reassigned to the new motorway: for example, EO7 road used to carry the E65 from Tripoli to Kalamata. When the A7 motorway was completed, the E65 was reassigned to it.

Class A roads
Road	Route
E55	Ferry: Brindisi, Italy – Igoumenitsa; EO: Igoumenitsa – Nea Thesi; EO19: Nea Thesi – Preveza; EO: Preveza – Actium; A52: Actium – Lake Amvrakia; A5: Lake Amvrakia – Missolonghi – Rio – Patras – Pyrgos; EO9: Pyrgos – Kalo Nero; EO9a: Kalo Nero – Tsakona; A7: Tsakona – Kalamata; EO82: within Kalamata
E65	EO3: Niki (border with North Macedonia); A27: Niki – Florina; EO: Florina – Vevi – Ptolemaida; A27: Ptolemaida – Kozani; EO: around Kozani; EO4: around Kozani; EO: around Kozani; EO3: Kozani – Larissa – Domokos – Lamia; EO: around Lamia; EO1: Lamia – Roditsa; A1: Roditsa – Thermopylae; EO: Thermopylae – Bralos; EO27: Bralos – Amfissa; EO48: Amfissa – Chrisso; EO: Chrisso – Itea – Nafpaktos; EO48: Nafpaktos – Antirrio; A5: Antirrio – Rio; A8: Rio – Aigio – Corinth; A7: Corinth – Tripoli – Kalamata; EO82: within Kalamata; Ferry: Kalamata – Kissamos; A90 / EO90: Kissamos – Chania
E75	A1: Evzonoi (border with North Macedonia) – Chalastra; A1 / A2: Kleidi - Chalastra – Thessaloniki (branch); A1: Kleidi – Larissa – Almyros – Lamia – Athens – Piraeus; Ferry: Piraeus – Chania; A90 / EO90: Chania – Heraklion – Agios Nikolaos – Sitia
E79	EO63: Promachonas (border with Bulgaria) – Promachonas; A25: Promachonas – Serres – Lagkadas; A2: Lagkadas – Efkarpia; EO2: Efkarpia – Thessaloniki
E85	EO: Ormenio (border with Bulgaria) – Kastanies; EO51: Kastanies – Didymoteicho – Ardani; EO2: Ardani – Alexandroupolis
E86	EO2: Krystallopigi (border with Albania) – Florina; EO: Florina – Vevi – Antigonos; EO: Antigonos – Arnissa; EO2: Arnissa – Gefyra
E90	Ferry: Brindisi, Italy – Igoumenitsa; A2: Igoumenitsa – Ioannina – Kozani – Thessaloniki – Alexandroupolis – Kipoi (border with Turkey)
E92	Ferry: Brindisi, Italy – Igoumenitsa; A2: Igoumenitsa – Ioannina – Kipoureio; A3: Kipoureio – Trikala; EO6: Trikala – Larissa; EO: Larissa Southern Bypass; EO1a; A1: Larissa – Velestino; EO6: Velestino – Volos
E94	A8: Corinth – Elefsina; A6: Elefsina – Metamorfosi – Koropi (via Attiki Odos, bypassing Athens)

Class B roads
Road	Route
E853	EO20: Ioannina – Kalpaki; EO22: Kalpaki – Kakavia (border with Albania)
E951	A5: Pedini (Note: Previously Ioannina until the opening of the A5.) – Arta – Kouvaras; EO5: Kouvaras – Agrinio – Missolonghi
E952	A52: Aktio – Vonitsa – Lake Amvrakia (Note: Previously Amfilochia until the opening of the A52.); A5: Lake Amvrakia – Kouvaras; EO5: Kouvaras – Agrinio; EO38: Agrinio – Karpenisi – Lamia
E961	EO39: Tripoli – Sparta – Gytheio
E962	EO3: Elefsina – Thebes

== See also ==
- Transport in Greece
- Greece
- European routes
- List of countries by road network size
