= A27 motorway (Greece) =

Road in Greece

A27 motorway
- Αυτοκινητόδρομος Α27
- Route of the A27 motorway, in green

Route information
- Part of E65
- Length: 78.5 km (48.8 mi)

Major junctions
- South end: Kozani (A2)
- North end: Border with North Macedonia (Niki)

Location
- Country: Greece
- Regions: Western Macedonia
- Primary destinations: Kozani; Ptolemaida; Border with North Macedonia (Niki)

Highway system
- Highways in Greece; Motorways; National roads
← A25	→ A29

The A27 motorway is a branch of the A2 Egnatia Odos motorway at Kozani, which leads towards Ptolemaida and from there to Florina and the Niki border crossing with North Macedonia. It is part of the European route E65.

Within 2012 tenders were announced for the construction of the 14,5 km section from Florina up to the border crossing with North Macedonia as a motorway. Construction started in 2013 and finished in December 2015. The northern part from Florina to Niki was opened to traffic on 20 May 2016. The section from Ptolemaida to Florina is operational as an expressway, and is planned to be upgraded to a motorway.

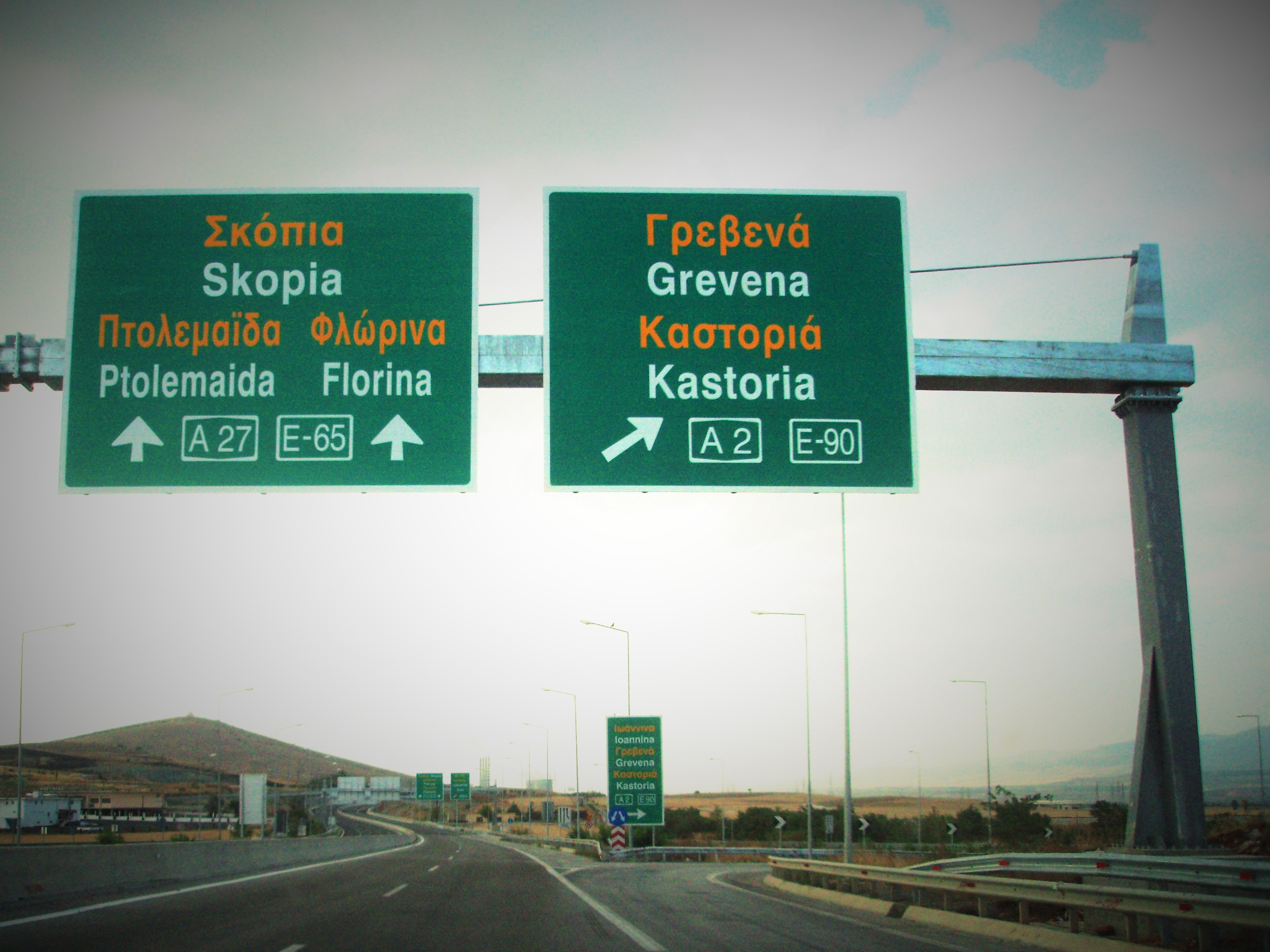
Entering A27, near the town of Kozani, heading north

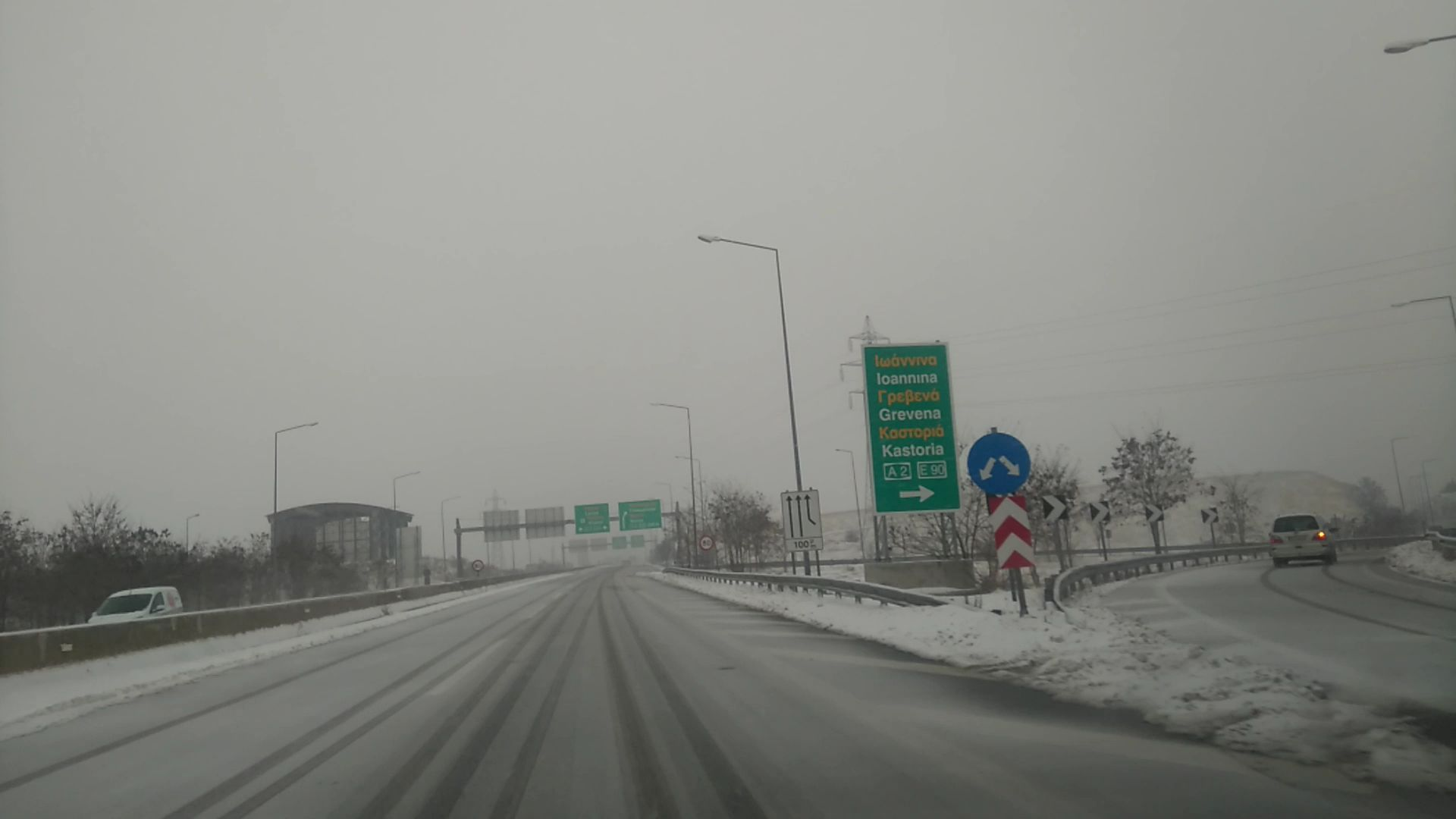
A27 exit to the A2 (towards the west) at the Kozani Ι/C (south end of A27), in winter 2018-19

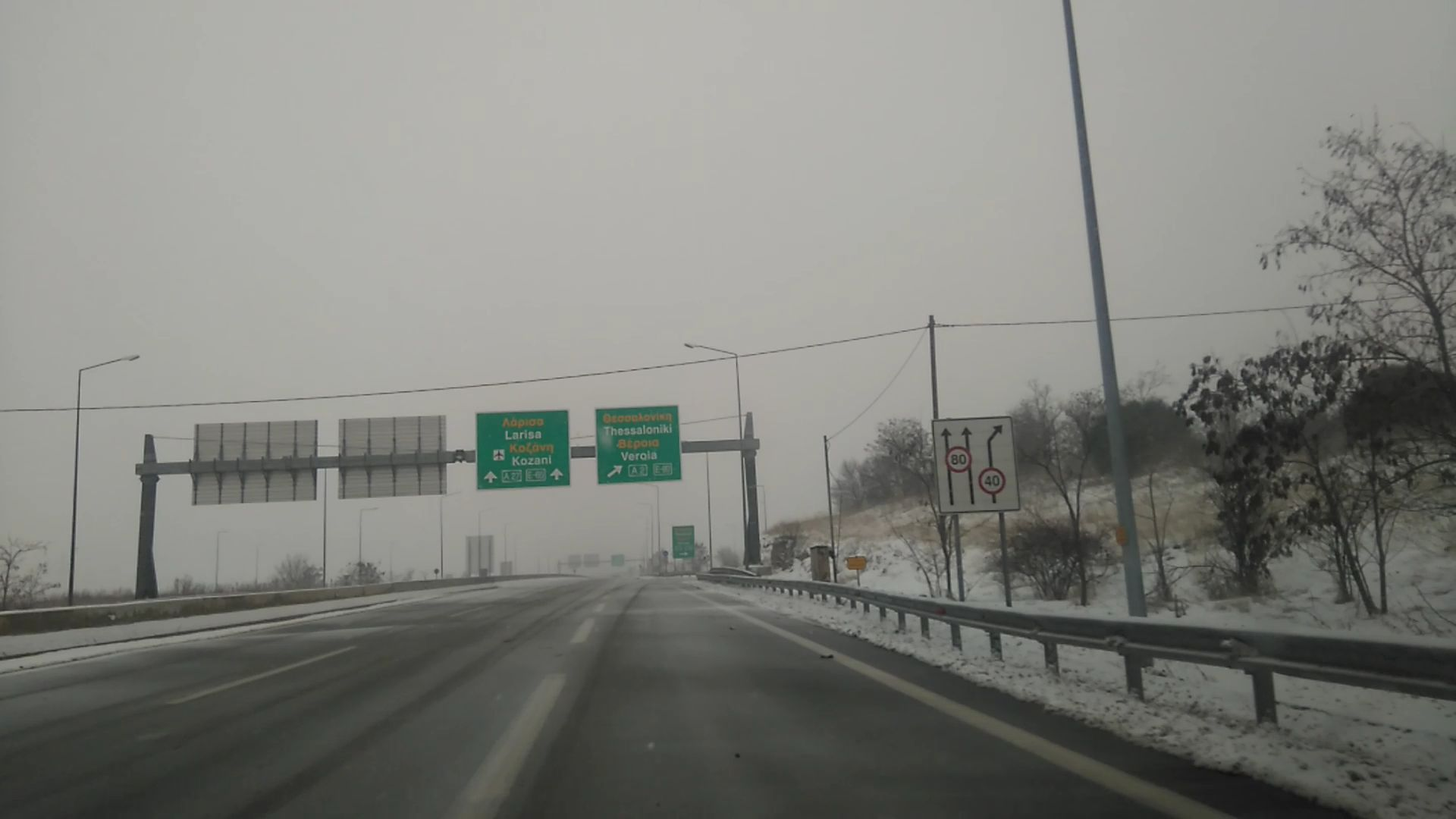
A27 exit to the A2 (towards the east) at the Kozani Ι/C (south end of A27), in winter 2018-19

== Exit list ==
Notes
Under construction
Planned

Regional unit	Exit	Name	Destinations	Notes/Also as
Florina		Niki border crossing (North Macedonia)	E65; North Macedonia	Northern terminus of the A27
Florina		Kato Kleines-Ano Kalliniki		E65
Florina		Florina	EO2 E86	E65
Florina		Vevi North	EO3 E86	Expressway/Upgrade planned E65
Florina		Vevi South	EO3 E86	Expressway/Upgrade planned E65
Florina		Xino Nero		Expressway/Upgrade planned E65
Florina		Amyntaio		Expressway/Upgrade planned E65
Florina		Vegoritida	Arnissa–Antigonos E86 to Edessa	Expressway/Upgrade planned E65
Florina		Filotas		Expressway/Upgrade planned E65
Kozani		Perdikkas		Expressway/Upgrade planned E65
Kozani		Ptolemaida North		E65
Kozani		Ptolemaida South	EO3	E65
Kozani		Pontokomi	EO3	E65
Kozani		Kozani Interchange	A2 E90 to Ioannina, Thessaloniki; EO3 E65 to Larissa	Southern terminus of A27
