= Arnissa–Antigonos National Road =

Trunk road in Greece

Arnissa–Antigonos National Road
- Εθνική Οδός Άρνισσας - Αντιγόνου
- Route of the Arnissa–Antigonos National Road, in blue

Route information
- Auxiliary route of EO2
- Part of E86
- Length: 26.3 km (16.3 mi)
- Existed: 15 December 1995–present

Major junctions
- East end: Arnissa
- West end: Antigonos

Location
- Country: Greece
- Regions: Central Macedonia; Western Macedonia
- Primary destinations: Arnissa; Antigonos

Highway system
- Highways in Greece; Motorways; National roads
← EO	→ EO

The Arnissa–Antigonos National Road (Greek: Εθνική Οδός Άρνισσας - Αντιγόνου) is an unnumbered national road in northern Greece. Designated by ministerial decree in 1995, it was built as a connection between the EO2 and the Ptolemaida–Florina National Road, and is part of European route E86.

== Route ==
The Arnissa–Antigonos National Road is officially defined as an east–west branch of the EO2, in the Central and Western Macedonia regions: the connection branches off the EO2 at Arnissa, and heads west to the junction with the Ptolemaida–Florina National Road at Antigonos. The connection, which has no number, is part of European route E86.

== History ==
Ministerial Decision DMEO/e/O/1308 of 15 December 1995 made the Arnissa–Antigonos connection into a national road, and subclassified the road as part of the secondary network.
