= Ptolemaida–Florina National Road =

Trunk road in Greece

Ptolemaida–Florina National Road
- Εθνική Οδός Πτολεμαΐδας - Φλώρινας
- Route of the Ptolemaida–Florina National Road, in blue

Route information
- Auxiliary route of EO3
- Part of E65 and E86
- Length: 48.4 km (30.1 mi)
- Existed: 15 December 1995–present

Major junctions
- South end: Ptolemaida
- North end: Florina

Location
- Country: Greece
- Regions: Western Macedonia
- Primary destinations: Ptolemaida; Vevi; Florina

Highway system
- Highways in Greece; Motorways; National roads
← EO	→ EO

The Ptolemaida–Florina National Road (Greek: Εθνική Οδός Πτολεμαΐδας - Φλώρινας) is an unnumbered national road in northern Greece. Designated by ministerial decree in 1995, it was built as a "new road" that ran mostly parallel to the EO3 between Ptolemaida and Florina, and is part of European routes E65 and E86.

== Route ==
The Ptolemaida–Florina National Road is officially defined as a north–south road in the Western Macedonia region: numbered the ΕΟ3β for statistical purposes by the National Statistical Service of Greece (ESYE), it is a "new road" that runs mostly parallel to the EO3, from Ptolemaida to Florina via Vevi. The entire road is part of European route E65, while the section between Florina and Antigonos is also part of the E86.

== History ==
Ministerial Decision DMEO/e/O/1308 of 15 December 1995 made the Ptolemaida–Florina "new road" into a national road, and subclassified the road as part of the secondary network.

== Future plans ==
In 2015, Ministerial Decision DOY/oik/5776 of 4 December 2015 proposed that the A27 motorway replace the Ptolemaida–Florina National Road, although the exact alignment is unclear: the A27 is currently split into two parts.
