= European route E65 =

Road in trans-European E-road network

E65

Route information
- Length: 4,400 km (2,700 mi)

Major junctions
- North end: Malmö, Sweden
- South end: Chania, Greece

Location
- Countries: Sweden; Poland; Czech Republic; Slovakia; Hungary; Croatia; Bosnia and Herzegovina; Montenegro; Serbia; Kosovo; North Macedonia; Greece

Highway system
- International E-road network; A Class; B Class

European route E65 is a north-south Class-A European route that begins in Malmö, Sweden and ends in Chania, Greece. The road is about 4,400 km (2,700 mi) in length. After crossing the Baltic Sea, it proceeds on land from north to south through Poland, the Czech Republic, Slovakia, Hungary, Croatia, Bosnia and Herzegovina, Montenegro, Serbia, Kosovo, North Macedonia, and Greece.

== Route ==
=== Sweden ===
- E65: Malmö ( E6 E20 E22) – Ystad
- (Sweden) Ystad - (Poland) Świnoujście

=== Poland ===
- DK 3: Świnoujście – Troszyn
- S 3: Troszyn – Goleniów (start of concurrency with E28) – Szczecin (end of concurrency with E28) – Gryfino – Pyrzyce – Myślibórz – Gorzów Wielkopolski – Skwierzyna – Międzyrzecz – Jordanowo ( E30) – Świebodzin – Zielona Góra – Nowa Sól - Legnica ( E40) - Jawor - Bolków - Kamienna Góra - Lubawka

=== Czechia ===
- I/10: Harrachov – Železný Brod – Turnov ( E442)
- D10: Turnov ( E442) - Prague
- D0: Prague ( E55 E67)
- D1: Prague (start of concurrency with E50 E59) - Humpolec ( E551) - Jihlava (end of concurrency with E59) - Brno ( E461, end of concurrency with E50)
- D2: Brno ( E50) - Břeclav

=== Slovakia ===
- D2: Brodské - Bratislava (start of concurrency with E75)

=== Hungary ===
- M15: Rajka - Mosonmagyaróvár ( E60)
- M1: Mosonmagyaróvár ( E60, end of concurrency with E75)
- 86: Mosonmagyaróvár ( E60 E75) - Csorna - Hegyfalu
- M86: Hegyfalu - Szombathely
- 86: Szombathely - Körmend ( E66) - Nádasd
- 76: Nádasd - Zalaegerszeg
- 761: Zalaegerszeg
- 74: Zalaegerszeg - Nagykanizsa ( E71)
- M7: Nagykanizsa (start of concurrency with E71) - Letenye ( E653)

=== Croatia ===
- A4: Goričan - Zagreb ( E59 E70)
- A3: Zagreb (concurrency with E70 within it)
- A1: Zagreb ( E70) - Karlovac - Bosiljevo (end of concurrency with E71)
- A6: Bosiljevo - Rijeka
- A7: Rijeka - Kraljevica
- D8: Kraljevica - Senj
- D23: Senj - Žuta Lokva ( E71)
- A1: Žuta Lokva (start of concurrency with E71) - Zadar - Split (end of concurrency with E71) - Mali Prolog ( E73)
- D425: Mali Prolog - Ploče
- D8: Ploče - Opuzen ( E73) - Klek

=== Bosnia and Herzegovina ===
- M-2: Neum

=== Croatia ===
- D8: Zaton Doli - Dubrovnik (start of concurrency with E80) - Karasovići

=== Montenegro ===
- M-1: Debeli Brijeg - Petrovac na Moru (start of concurrency with E-851) - Sutomore (end of concurrency with E-851)
- M-1.1: Sutomore ( E-851) - Virpazar
- M-2: Virpazar - Podgorica ( E-762) - Ribarevine ( E-763)
- M-5: Ribarevine ( E-763) - Berane (Note: The route between Montenegro and Kosovo is unclear, a problem currently shared with E80 which is concurrent with E65 on this section. The existing M-2 road that goes through Bijelo Polje continues northwards through western Serbia as E763, away from the direction of Pristina. Instead the route needs to turn to the east some 4 km (2.5 mi) before Bijelo Polje, at Ribarevina junction, and towards Priština. After that, the route goes southeast, throrugh Berane and Rožaje, where the route winds slightly northwards again, goes through western Serbia near Tutin, and then enters Kosovo near Zubin Potok.) - Dračenovac

=== Serbia ===
- 22: Špiljani - Ribariće
- 32: Ribariće - Vitkoviće

=== Kosovo ===
- M-2: Bërnjak - Mitrovica - Pristina ( E851, end of concurrency with E80)
- R 6: Pristina - Hani i Elezit

=== North Macedonia ===
- A4: Blace - Skopje (Towards E75)
- A2: Skopje (Towards E75) - Ohrid ( E852)
- A3: Ohrid ( E852) - Medžitlija

=== Greece ===
- EO3: Niki (border with North Macedonia)
- A27: Niki – Florina
- EO: Florina – Vevi – Ptolemaida
- A27: Ptolemaida – Kozani
- EO: around Kozani
- EO4: around Kozani
- EO: around Kozani
- EO3: Kozani – Larissa – Domokos – Lamia
- EO: around Lamia
- EO1: Lamia – Roditsa
- A1: Roditsa – Thermopylae
- EO: Thermopylae – Bralos
- EO27: Bralos – Amfissa
- EO48: Amfissa – Chrisso
- EO: Chrisso – Itea – Nafpaktos
- EO48: Nafpaktos – Antirrio
- A5: Antirrio – Rio
- A8: Rio – Aigio – Corinth
- A7: Corinth – Tripoli – Kalamata
- EO82: within Kalamata
- Ferry: Kalamata – Kissamos
- A90 / EO90: Kissamos – Chania

The E65 in Greece currently runs from Niki in the north to Chania in the south, via Vevi, Kozani, Larissa, Domokos, Lamia, Bralos, Itea, Antirrio, Rio, Aigio, Corinth, Tripoli, Kalamata and Kissamos: the section between Kalamata and Kissamos is a ferry.

The A3 motorway is also promoted as being part of the E65: however, the AGR needs to be amended to allow the E65 to officially follow the A3, because the revised route will no longer serve Larissa and Domokos (as currently defined).

The E65 runs concurrently with the E55 on the Rio–Antirrio Bridge and part of the A7 between Tsakona and Kalamata, the E75 on the A1 segment, and the E86 on part of the A27 between Florina and Levaia. The E65 also connects with the E75 at Chania, the E90 at Kozani, the E92 at Larissa, the E94 at Corinth, the E952 at Lamia, and the E961 at Tripoli.
