= Greek National Road 3 =

Trunk road in Greece

Coordinates: 39.3391°N 22.3943°E

National Road 3
- Εθνική Οδός 3
- Route of the EO3 and Koila–Drepano national roads, and the Lamia Eastern Bypass, in blue

Route information
- Length: 493.5 km (306.6 mi)
- Existed: 9 July 1963–present

Major junctions
- South end: Elefsina
- North end: Border with North Macedonia (Niki)

Location
- Country: Greece
- Regions: Attica; Central Greece; Thessaly; Western Macedonia
- Primary destinations: Elefsina; Thebes; Livadeia; Bralos; Lamia; Farsala; Larissa; Elassona; Servia; Kozani; Ptolemaida; Vevi; Florina; Border with North Macedonia (Niki)

Highway system
- Highways in Greece; Motorways; National roads
← EO2	→ EO4

Greek National Road 3 (Greek: Εθνική Οδός 3), abbreviated as the EO3, is a national road in Greece. It runs between Elefsina (near Athens) and the border of North Macedonia at Niki, passing through many cities and towns such as Lamia, Larissa, Kozani and Florina. At Niki, the EO3 connects with the A3 road towards Bitola. The section Kozani - Niki is also designated as the A27 motorway, part of which is operational as a 2-lane motorway.

At 493.5 kilometres (306.6 miles), the EO3 is one of the longest national roads in Greece, with the southern half serving as the main route from Larissa to Thessaloniki until July 1963. The A1 motorway now offers a faster connection to Thessaloniki. Most of the EO3, except the southernmost section between Eleusis and Bralos, is part of the E65.

== Future developments ==
Throughout the late 1980s, motorway bypasses were constructed at the towns of Tyrnavos and Elassonas, but in 2002 plans surfaced to convert all of the road into a new motorway, from Larissa to Kozani and further on to Bitola, in North Macedonia. Throughout the 2000s motorway sections were delivered to the public and are running north of Larissa and north of Kozani, up to Ptolemaida. Remaining parts have either fallen through, as no construction works are currently being undertaken and no further announcements have been delivered by the government.

== Route ==
The EO3 is officially defined as a north–south route through central Greece, running between Elefsina to the south and the Greece–North Macedonia border to the north at Niki: however, the EO3 is split into two parts, because the A27 motorway replaced a short segment of the former near Mavrodendri. At the border with North Macedonia, the EO3 connects with the A3 road towards Bitola.

The section between Elefsina and Kozani passes through Thebes, Livadeia, Bralos, Lamia, Farsala, Larissa, Elassona and Servia: the section between Mavrodendri and Niki passes through Ptolemaida, Vevi and Agios Athanasios (near Florina). The EO3 overlaps with the EO30 from Neo Monastiri to Farsala, and with the EO2 from Vevi to Agios Athanasios. The exact alignment of the EO3 between Mavrodendri and Filotas also varies due to lignite mining in the area.

The EO3 forms part of the European route E962 from Elefsina to Thebes, and the E65 from Lamia to Kozani as well as the short segment from the northern end of the A27 to the Greece–North Macedonia border. There are plans to reroute the E65 away from the EO3 between Lamia and Kozani, after the A3 is connected to the A2 (Egnatia Odos), but this would require amending Annex I of the European Agreement on Main International Traffic Arteries (AGR) to reroute the E65 away from Larissa and Domokos (as currently defined).

== History ==
Ministerial Decision G25871 of 9 July 1963 created the current EO3 from all or part of the following short-lived national roads (listed from south to north), which existed by royal decree from 1955 to 1963:

- The old EO1 from Elefsina to Larissa
- The old EO30 from Larissa to Kozani
- The old EO31 from Kozani to Vevi
- The old EO36 from Vevi to Agios Athanasios, near Florina (shared with the current EO2)
- The old EO37 from Agios Athanasios to the Greece–North Macedonia border at Niki

Until 1975, the EO3 formed part of the old European route E92 from Lamia to Kozani, the old E90 from Kozani to Vevi, and the old E20 from Vevi to Agios Athanasios.

== Branches ==
=== Koila–Drepano National Road ===
The Koila–Drepano National Road (Greek: Εθνική Οδός Κοίλων - Δρεπάνου) is an unnumbered, dual carriageway branch of the EO3 in Kozani, running from Koila in the west to Drepano and the EO4 in the east: the branch is about 2.57 kilometres (1.60 miles) long, and connects the EO3 and EO4 with the A27 motorway in the northern outskirts of Kozani. The Koila–Drepano National Road was defined by the National Statistical Service of Greece (ESYE) in 1998, numbering it the EO3γ for statistical purposes, and is also part of European route E65.

=== Lamia Eastern Bypass ===
The Lamia Eastern Bypass (Greek: Ανατολική Παράκαμψη Λαμίας) is a unnumbered connection between the EO1 and the EO3, which bypasses Lamia to the north east: the bypass is about 5.37 kilometres (3.34 miles) long, and also carries the European route E65 between Domokos and Bralos.

The Lamia Eastern Bypass was made a national road by Ministerial Decision DMEO/e/O/1308 of 15 December 1995, which also subclassified the road as part of the secondary national network.

== See also ==
- Larissa Southern Bypass, a branch of the EO3
