= A25 motorway (Greece) =

Road in Greece

Coordinates: 40.8273°N 23.0414°E

A25 motorway
- Αυτοκινητόδρομος Α25
- Route of the A25 motorway, in green
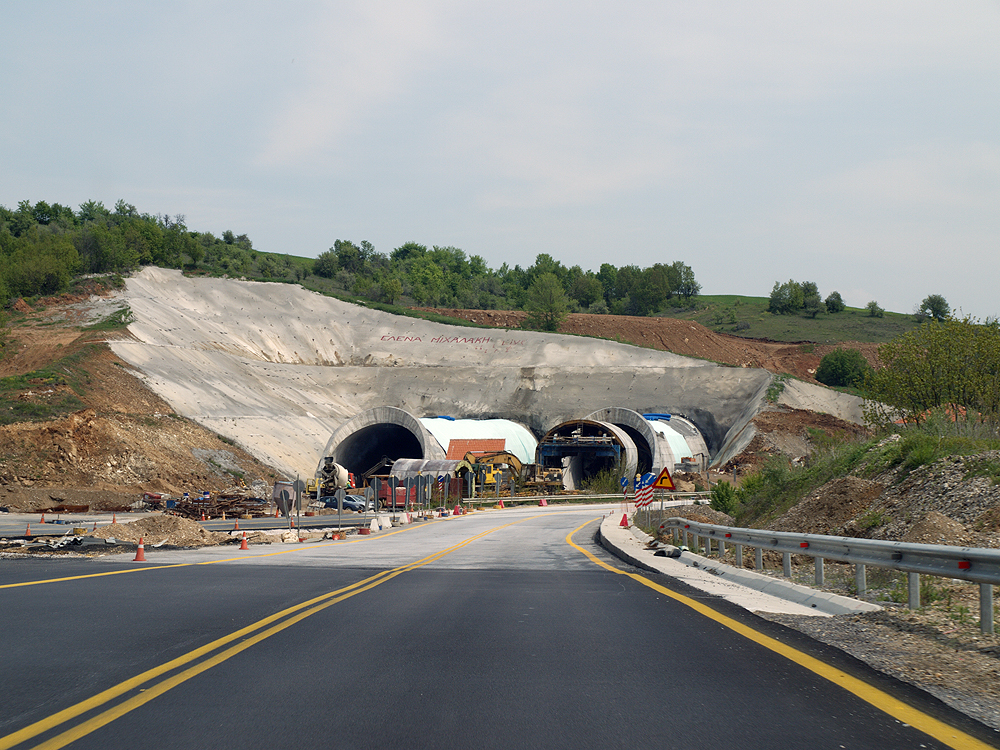
- Construction of the Dorkados tunnel between Thessaloniki and Promachonas

Route information
- Part of E79

Major junctions
- South end: Lagkadas (A2)
- North end: Border with Bulgaria (Promachonas)

Location
- Country: Greece
- Regions: Central Macedonia
- Primary destinations: Lagkadas; Serres; Border with Bulgaria (Promachonas)

Highway system
- Highways in Greece; Motorways; National roads
← A242	→ A27

The A25 motorway is a controlled-access highway in northern Greece. It connects the Greek-Bulgarian border at Promachonas in the north with the A2 motorway north of the city of Thessaloniki.

== Exit list ==
Regional unit	Name	Destinations	Notes/Also as
Serres	Promachonas border crossing	to Sofia; Bulgaria	Northern terminus of the A25
Serres	Promachonas		European route E79
Serres	Roupel		European route E79
Serres	Neo Petritsi	to Doiran Lake	European route E79
Serres	Sidirokastro	Greek National Road 63	European route E79
Serres	Kamaroto	Greek National Road 63	European route E79
Serres	Vamvakofyto		European route E79
Serres	Palaiokastro		European route E79
Serres	Melenikitsi		European route E79
Serres	Kato Christos	to Serres	European route E79
Serres	Lefkonas	to Serres	European route E79
Serres	Provatas		European route E79
Serres	Strymoniko	Greek National Road 12	European route E79
Thessaloniki	Lachanas		European route E79
Thessaloniki	Xylopoli		European route E79
Thessaloniki	Dorkada		European route E79
Thessaloniki	Assiros		European route E79
Thessaloniki	Kilkis/Lagkadas interchange	to Kilkis	European route E79
Thessaloniki	Lagkadas interchange	to Thessaloniki	Southern terminus of the A25
