= European route E763 =

Road in trans-European E-road network

E763

Route information
- Length: 348 km (216 mi)

Major junctions
- North end: E70 / E75 Belgrade
- E761 Čačak; E761 Užice; Nova Varoš; Bijelo Polje
- South end: E65 / E80 Ribarevine

Location
- Countries: Serbia, Montenegro

Highway system
- International E-road network; A Class; B Class

European route E 763 is part of the International E-road network. It begins in Belgrade, Serbia and ends in Bijelo Polje, Montenegro. Most of E763 sections, in Serbia, are currently in the process of being upgraded, with the help of several Chinese construction companies.

== Route ==
- Serbia (i.e. A2)
  - E70 / E75 Belgrade
  - E761 Čačak
  - E761 Užice
  - Nova Varoš
- Montenegro
  - M-2: Barski Most - Bijelo Polje - Ribarevine ( E65 / E80)
