= Balkan Wars Museum =

Museum

Coordinates: 40.7294°N 22.6994°E

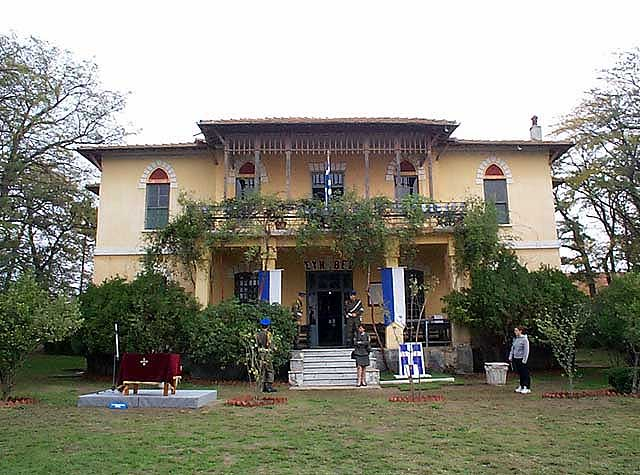
Exterior view of the museum

The Balkan Wars Museum (Greek: Μουσείο Βαλκανικών Πολέμων Mousio Valkanikon Polemon) is a museum in Gefyra, west of Thessaloniki, Central Macedonia, Greece, dedicated to the Balkan Wars.

== History and description ==
The museum was founded on 26 October 1999. It occupies a two-storey building, built at the end of the nineteenth century near the entrance to the village. It is known as the Villa Topsin and it was here that the negotiations between the Greeks (under Crown Prince Constantine) and Ottoman forces were held when Thessaloniki was surrendered to the Greek army in October 1912.

All the furniture in the museum is authentic and has been supplemented by furniture which the army had previously kept in storage. The room in which Commander-in-Chief Crown Prince Constantine spent the night contains all the furniture which he actually used. The exhibits consist of photographs and lithographs of the wars of 1912-13. Of particular note are four paintings by Kenan Messare, the son of Hasan Tahsin Pasha, who surrendered the city to the Greeks, and accompanied Constantine on the Epirus campaign and in the Second Balkan War. They depict scenes from the Battle of Kilkis-Lachanas during the Second Balkan War.

There are also the entire sets of the military decorations awarded by the Greek, Turkish, and Bulgarian armies; a display of medals; many everyday objects used by officers and men; cards sent from here by Greek Prime Minister Eleftherios Venizelos; and Greek and Bulgarian uniforms, the most important of which is the one worn by Lieutenant-Colonel Papakyriazis, who was killed at the Battle of Kilkis-Lachanas.

The museum also boasts a very large collection of Greek, Bulgarian, and Turkish weapons, including Greek and Bulgarian Mannlicher rifles, a Turkish Mauser, a Greek Mannlicher pistol, Turkish Mauser and Smith & Wesson pistols, a Greek Schwarzlose M1907/12 machine-gun, and the whole range of swords used by the Greek and the Bulgarian armies.

== Gallery ==
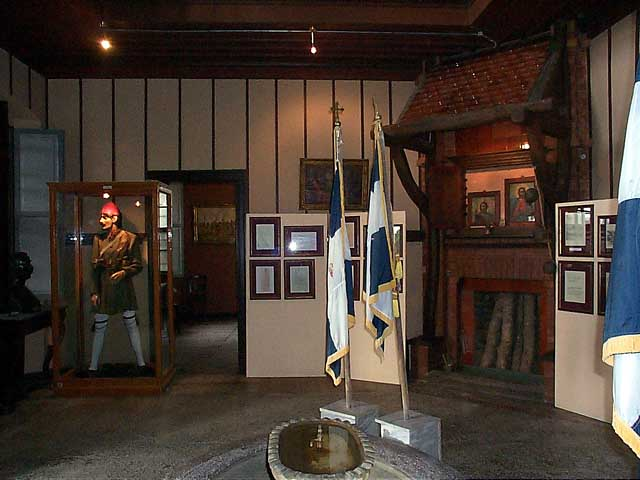
Central hall

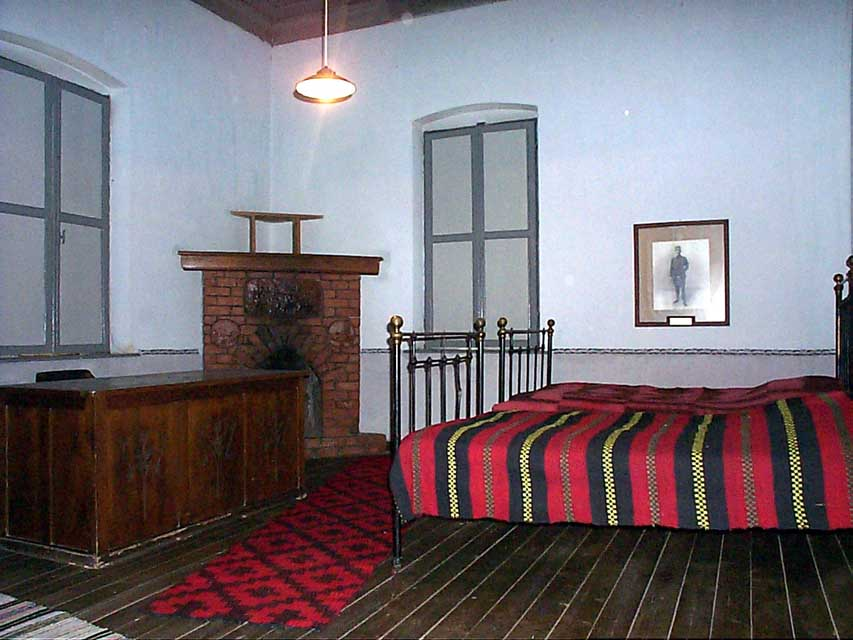
Room of Crown Prince Constantine

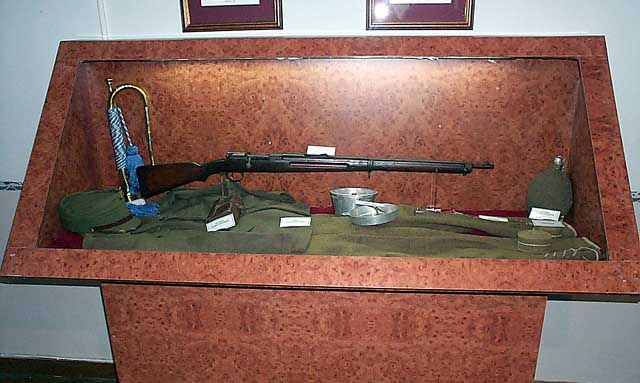
Uniform of Papakyriazis

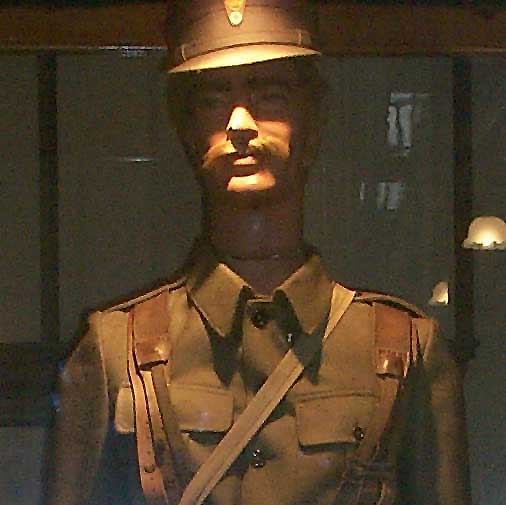
Greek uniform
