= Greek National Road 2 =

Road in Greece

Coordinates: 40.7587°N 22.5031°E

National Road 2
- Εθνική Οδός 2
- Route of the EO2 and Amphipolis–Kavala national roads, in blue
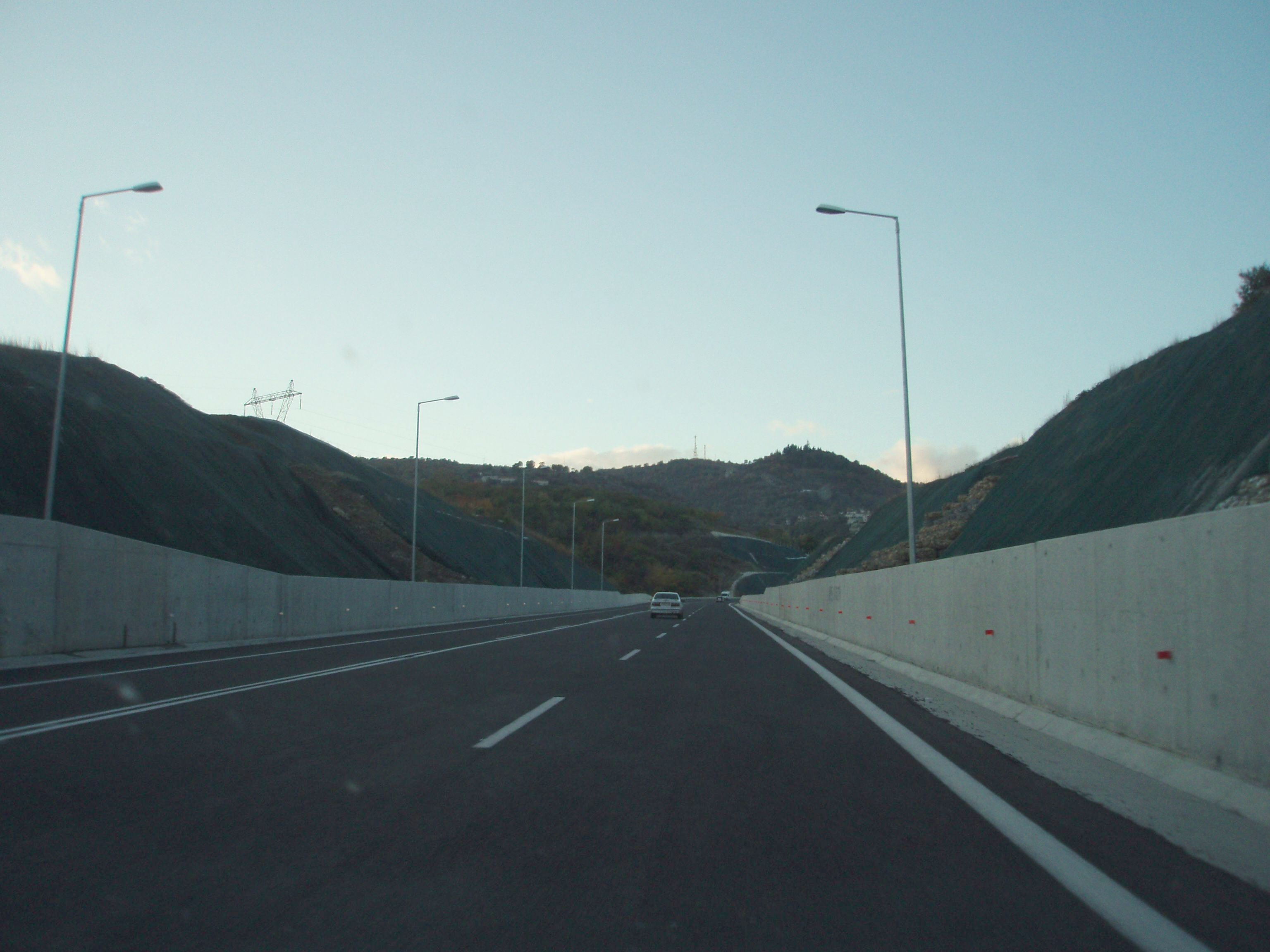
- EO2 near Edessa

Route information
- Part of E79 (Thessaloniki–Efkarpia), E85 (Alexandroupolis–Ardani), and E86 (Krystallopigi–Gefyra)
- Length: 583.0 km (362.3 mi)
- Existed: 9 July 1963–present

Major junctions
- West end: Border with Albania (Krystallopigi)
- East end: Border with Turkey (Evros bridge)

Location
- Country: Greece
- Regions: Western Macedonia; Central Macedonia; Eastern Macedonia and Thrace
- Primary destinations: Border with Albania (Krystallopigi); Vatochori; Pisoderi; Florina; Edessa; Giannitsa; Chalkidona; Thessaloniki; Lagkadikia; Amphipolis; Kavala; Toxotes; Xanthi; Lagos; Komotini; Mesi; Alexandroupolis; Feres; Ardani; Border with Turkey (Evros bridge)

Highway system
- Highways in Greece; Motorways; National roads
← EO1a	→ EO3

Greek National Road 2 (Greek: Εθνική Οδός 2), abbreviated as the EO2, is a national road in northern Greece. It is as of May 2026 the longest national road in Greece, running for 583.0 kilometres (362.3 miles) between the border with Albania near Krystallopigi and the border with Turkey near Kipoi, via Thessaloniki. The section of EO2 between Krystallopigi and Gefyra carries European route E86, while the section east of Thessaloniki has been superseded by the newer A2 motorway (Egnatia Odos).

== Route ==
The EO2 is officially defined as an east–west route through northern Greece, passing through the administrative regions of Western Macedonia, Central Macedonia, and Eastern Macedonia and Thrace. The road runs between the Albania–Greece border near Krystallopigi to the west, and the Greece–Turkey border at Kipoi to the east: the western end of the EO2 connects with the Albanian SH 3 road, and the eastern end with the Turkish D.110.

In practice, the EO2 is split into two parts by the A2 motorway (Egnatia Odos), which replaced the segment between Efkarpia and Lagyna. The A2 also provides a faster route than the EO2 between Lagyna and Kipoi: the western section (Krystallopigi–Efkarpia) passes through Vatochori, Pisoderi, Florina, Edessa, Giannitsa, Chalkidona and the city centre of Thessaloniki; the eastern section (Lagyna–Kipoi) passes through Lagkadikia, Amphipolis, Kavala, Toxotes, Xanthi, Lagos, Komotini, Mesi, Alexandroupolis, Feres and Ardani. The EO2 overlaps with the EO15 from Vatochori to Trigono, with the EO3 from Agios Athanasios to Vevi, and with the EO1 Chalkidona to Gefyra.

Since 1975, the EO2 is part of three European routes: the E79 follows the EO2 from Thessaloniki to Efkarpia; the E86 from Krystallopigi to Florina and from Arnissa to Gefyra (the section between Gefyra and Thessaloniki was dropped on 12 September 1986); and the E85 from Alexandroupolis to Ardani.

== History ==
Ministerial Decision G25871 of 9 July 1963 created the current EO2 from all or part of the following short-lived national roads (listed from west to east), which existed by royal decree from 1955 to 1963:

- The old EO34 from the Albania–Greece border at Krystallopigi to Vatochori
- The old EO33 from Vatochori to Agios Athanasios, near Florina
- The old EO36 from Agios Athanasios to Gefyra
- The old EO1 from Gefyra to Thessaloniki
- The old EO41 from Thessaloniki to Ardani
- The old EO48 from Ardani to the Greece–Turkey border at Kipoi.

Until 1975, the EO2 formed part of the old European route E20 from the Albania–Greece border at Krystallopigi to Lagyna (north of Thessaloniki), and the old E5 from Gefyra to the Greece–Turkey border at Kipoi: hence, the old E5 and E20 overlaps between Gefyra and Lagyna.

== Amphipolis–Kavala National Road ==
The Amphipolis–Kavala National Road (Greek: Εθνική Οδός Αμφίπολης - Καβάλας) is a "New National Road" realignment of the EO2 in the Pangaio municipality, built before the A2 motorway (Egnatia Odos): the segment is about 46.3 kilometres (28.8 miles) long, and runs along the coast of the Aegean Sea between Amphipolis and Kavala, via Nea Peramos.

The Amphipolis–Kavala National Road was created by Ministerial Decision DMEO/e/O/1308 of 15 December 1995, originally as part of the "basic national network" route between Thessaloniki and the border with Turkey near Kipoi, and was numbered the EO105 for statistical purposes by the National Statistical Service of Greece (ESYE) in 1998.
