= Mesi, Rhodope =

Mesi Μέση
- Community
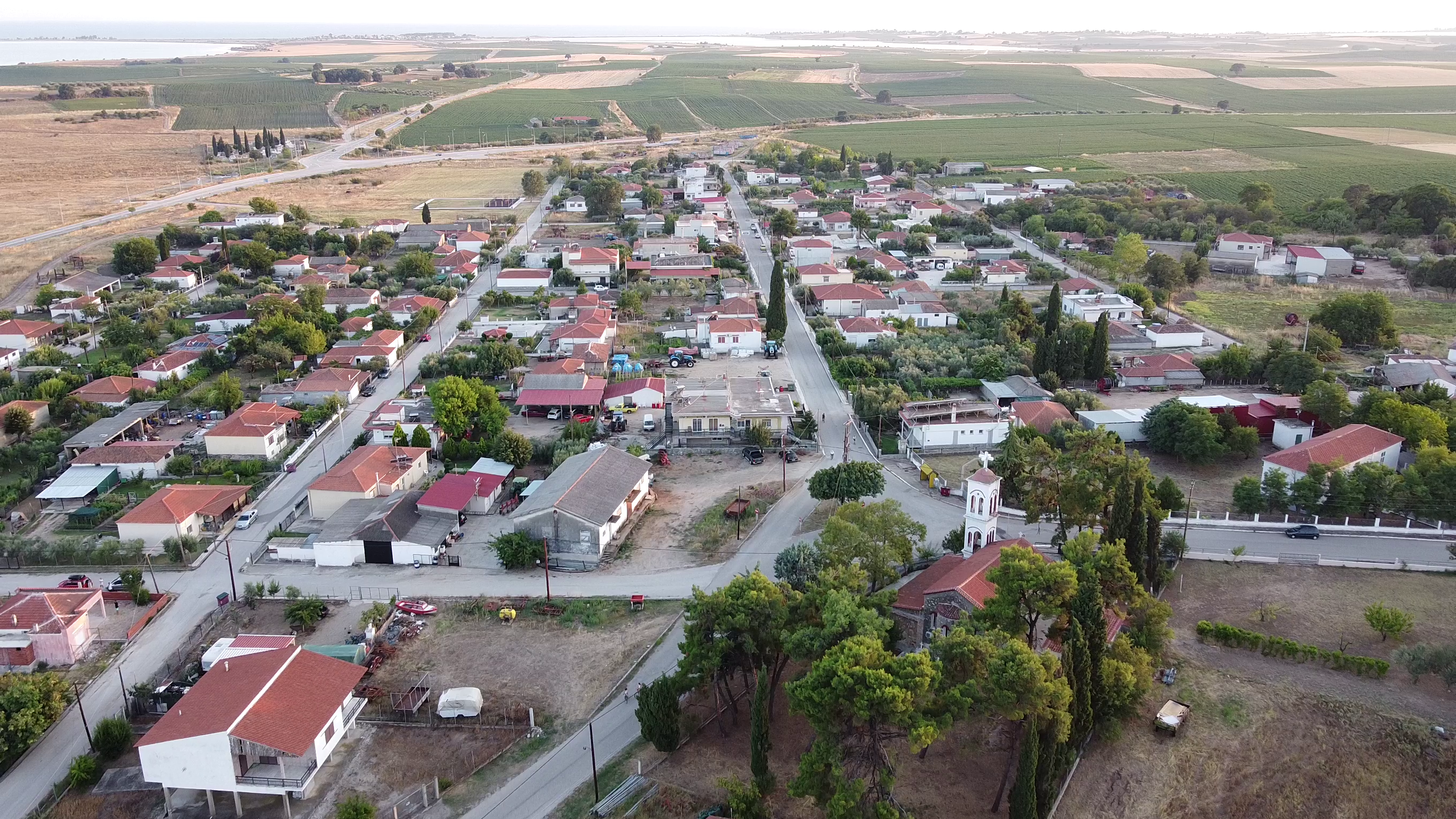

- Location within Greece
- Coordinates: 40°58′55″N 25°12′39″E
- Country: Greece
- Administrative region: Eastern Macedonia and Thrace
- Regional unit: Rhodope
- Municipality: Komotini
- Municipal unit: Aigeiros
- Village established: 1902
- Highest elevation: 24 m (79 ft)
- Lowest elevation: 6 m (20 ft)

Population (2021)
  - Community: 141
- Time zone: UTC+2 (EET)
  - Summer (DST): UTC+3 (EEST)
- Postal code: 691 50
- Area code: 25350

Mesi (Μέση) is a village in Thrace, in the Rhodope Regional Unit, Greece. It lies near the Vistonia Bay and the Lake Vistonida approximately 28 kilometers southwest of Komotini and 37 kilometers east-southeast of Xanthi.

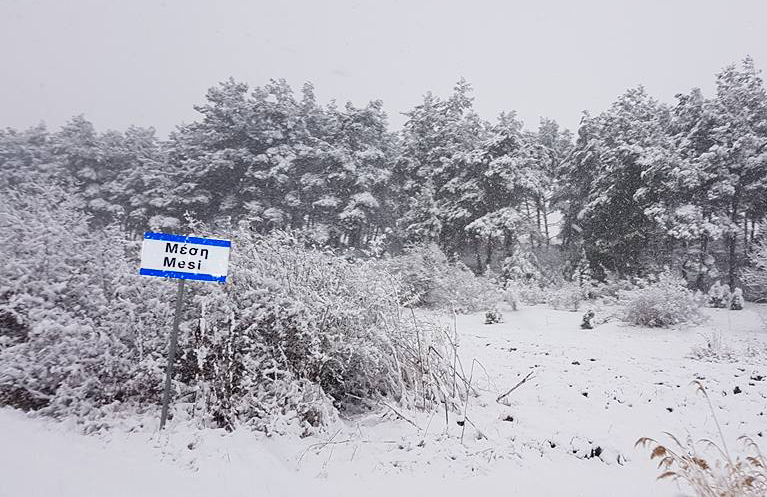
The north-east entrance of the village

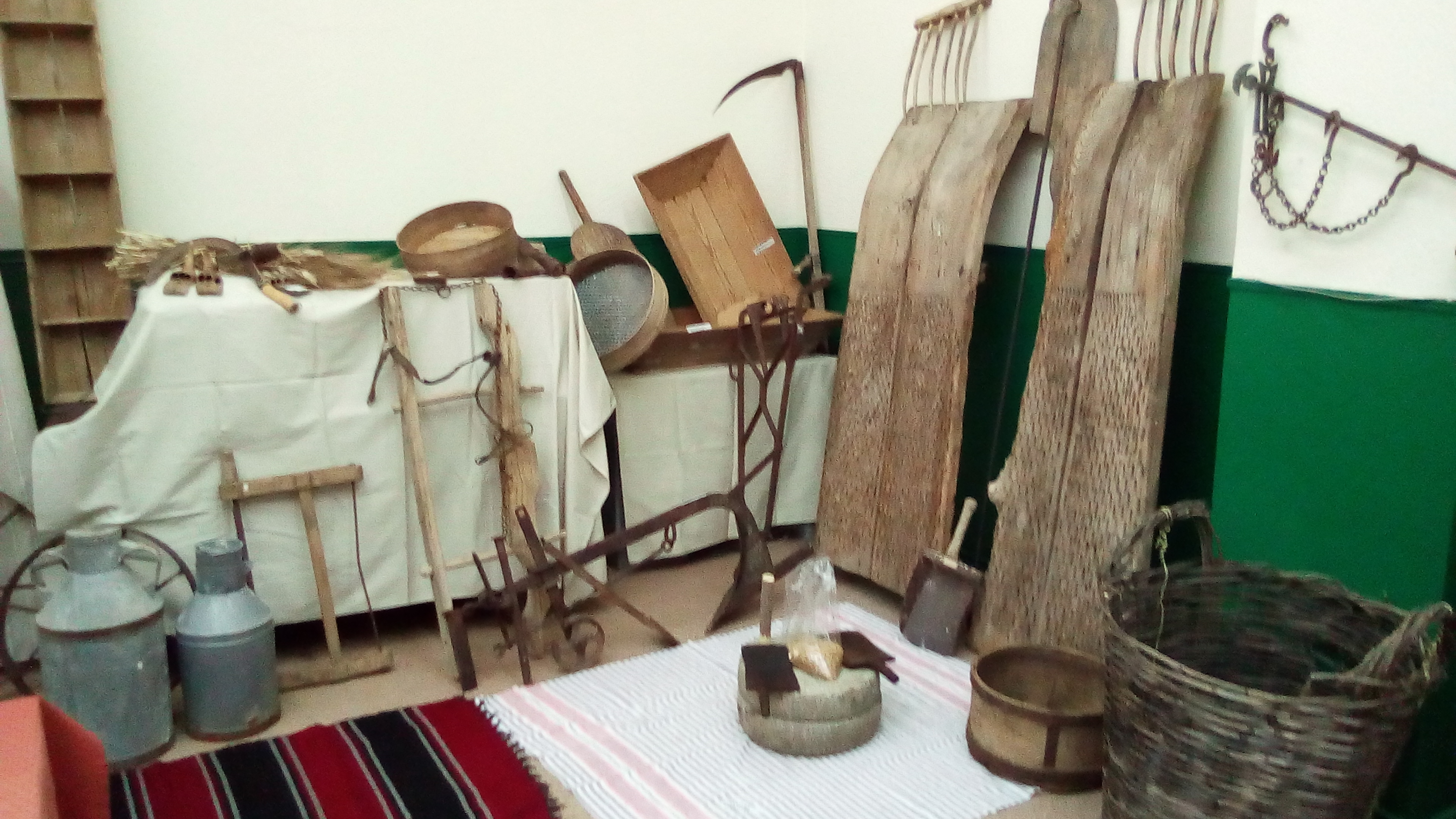
View from the Folklife Museum of Mesi

In the village there is a Folklife Museum and a fish festival is organized every year.

== Origin ==
The majority of the village's inhabitants are refugees from Eastern Thrace, primarily from the villages of:

- Karlikio (known as Psathia in 1920), Kessani district.
- Tsiflikio (known as Verona in 1920), Arkadioupolis district.
- Devezikio (known as Evandros in 1920), Malgaro district.

== Demographic evolution ==
In summary, the demographic evolution of the settlement according to the national censuses is as follows:

1920	1928	1940	1951	1961	1971	1981	1991	2001	2011	2021
346	376	580	611	464	517	341	348	317	181	141

== Administrative history ==
The administrative history of Mesi includes the following changes:

- In 1924, Mesi was annexed to the community of Glykoneri.
- In 1928, it became the seat of the Pagourion community.
- In 1965, the Pagourion community was renamed as the community of Mesi.
- In 1997, Mesi was incorporated into the municipality of Aigeiros. The community of Mesi is disestablished.
- In 2010, it was transferred to the municipality of Komotini following the administrative reform under the Kallikratis Plan. The municipality of Aigeiros is disestablished.

== Cultural and religious sites ==
=== Churches of Mesi ===
==== Church of Agia Paraskevi ====
The Church of Agia Paraskevi is the main church in Mesi and dedicated to the village's patron saint, as it was in Karlikio, Saint Paraskevi of Rome. Construction began in 1954 and was completed in 1957, with its inauguration by Metropolitan bishop of Maroneia and Thassos Timotheus Matthaiakis in 1961. In 1995, a new bell tower was completed, housing a 174-kg bell. Since 2015, the church has also housed relics of Saint Sophia of Kleisoura.

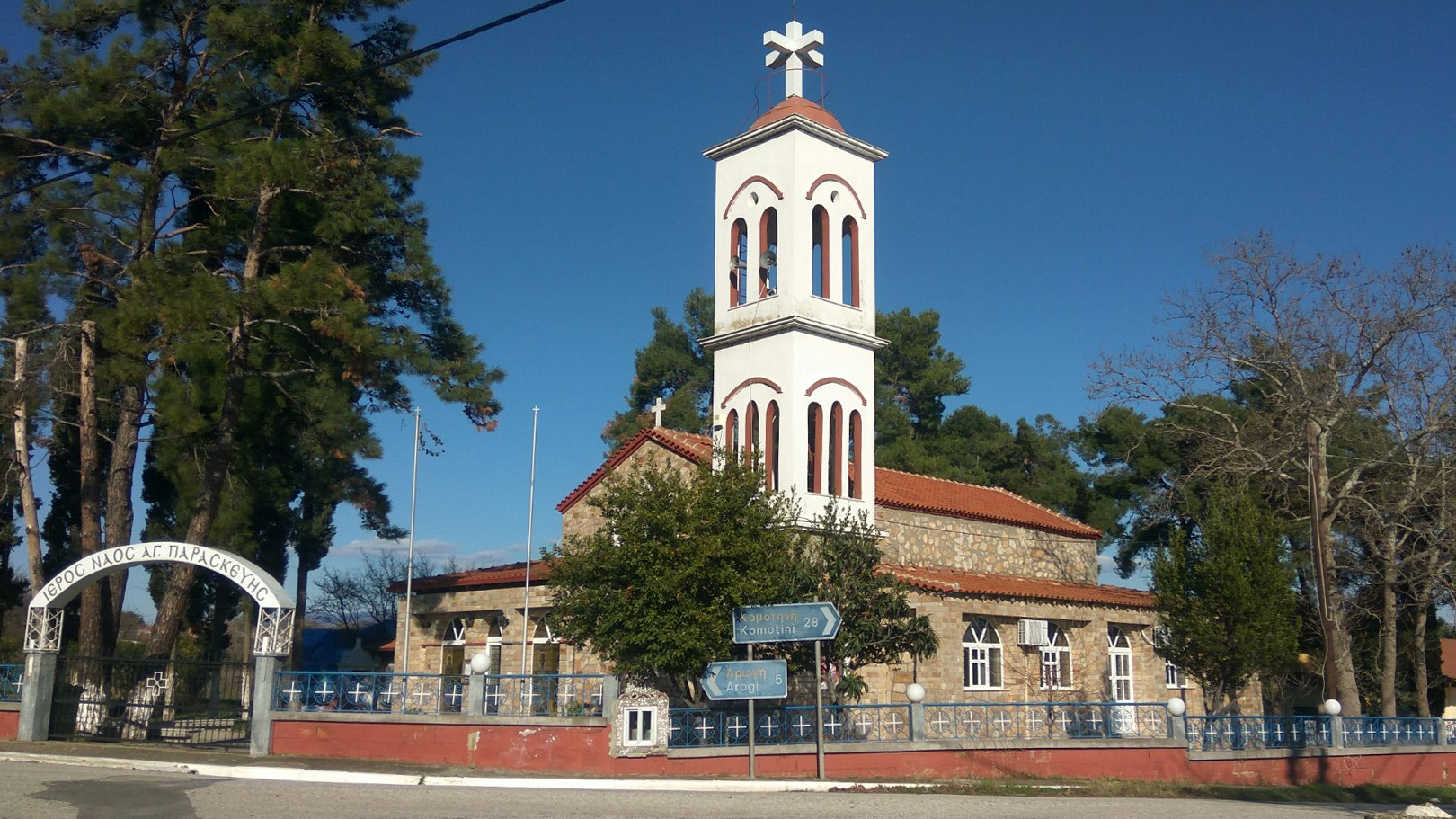
View of Agia Paraskevi Church

Priests of the church in chronological order:

- father-Thanasis Psaridis
- father-Dimitris Milias
- father-Nicolas Zisis
- father-Dimitris Molas
- father-Gabriel Giannoulis
- father-Georgos Tournoglou
- father-Thodoros Sporidis
- father-Georgis Avgitidis
- father-Thanasis Dontsos
- father-Georgos Siafakas

==== Church of the Dormition of the Virgin ====
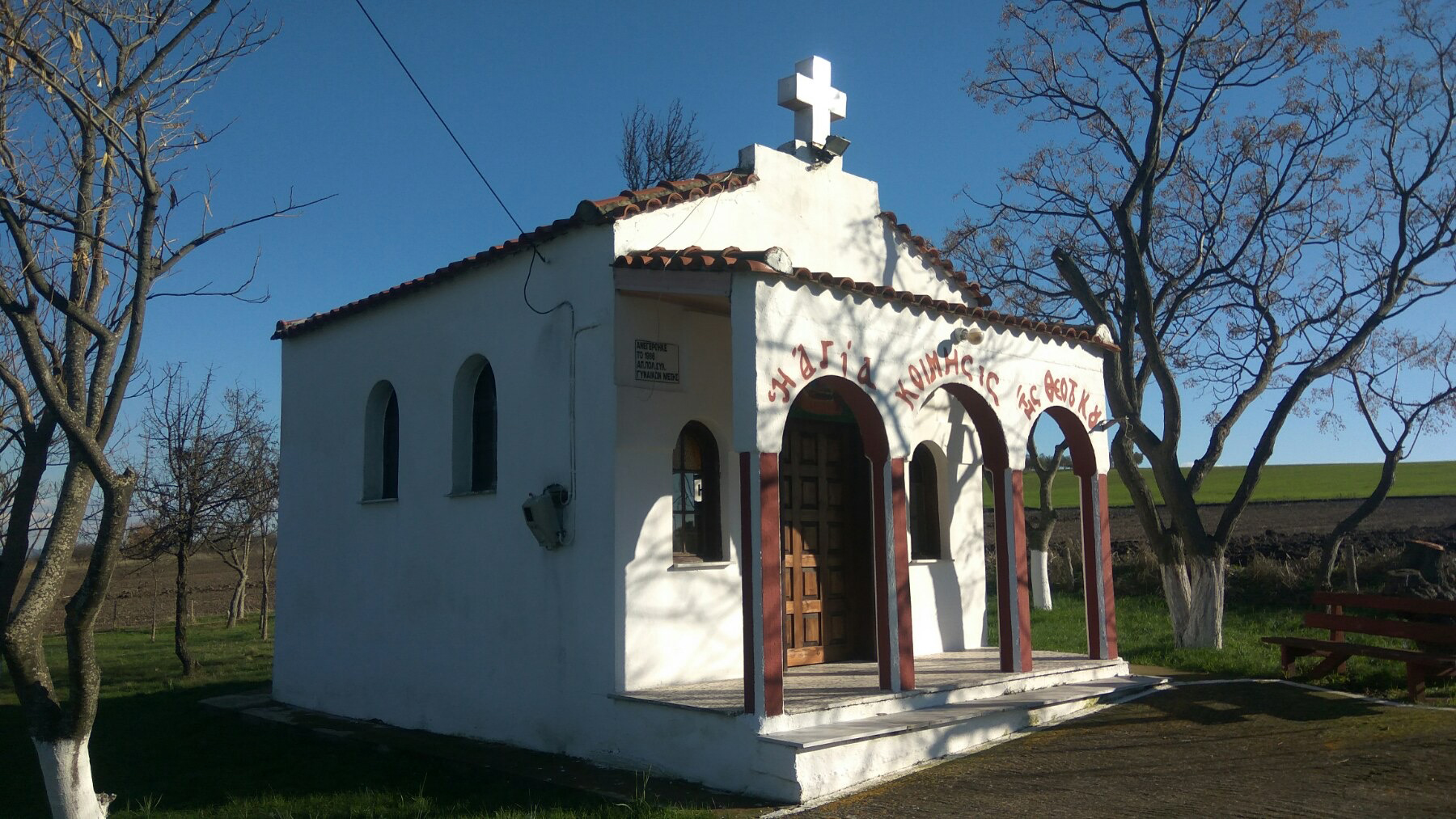
View of Dormition of the Virgin Church

The Church of the Dormition of the Virgin Mary was originally built in 1943 by Chrysanthi Syropoulou following visions of the Virgin Mary. The present structure was constructed in 1986 on the same site by the Cultural Folklore Association of Mesi and descendants of Karlikio refugees. An annual feast is celebrated on 15 August, featuring a solemn vespers and a procession of an icon brought from Karlikio by Giannoula Papoulia.

=== Folklife Museum ===
The Folklife Museum of Mesi opened in July 2018. It spans two halls and features heirlooms, old tools, utensils, and home furnishings that represent the cultural heritage of the area. The museum is the result of extensive efforts by the Cultural Folklore Association of Mesi and friends of Karlikio.

== Events ==
The village hosts several annual events, including:

- The last week of February: Spring celebrations with bonfires in the village square.
- 1 July: Feast of the Virgin Mary "Rodon the Amaranth."
- 25–26 July: Feast of Saint Paraskevi, the patron saint of Mesi.
- 15 August: Feast of the Dormition of the Virgin Mary.
- Autumn: Fish Festival, revived in 2018.

== Salt evaporation ponds ==
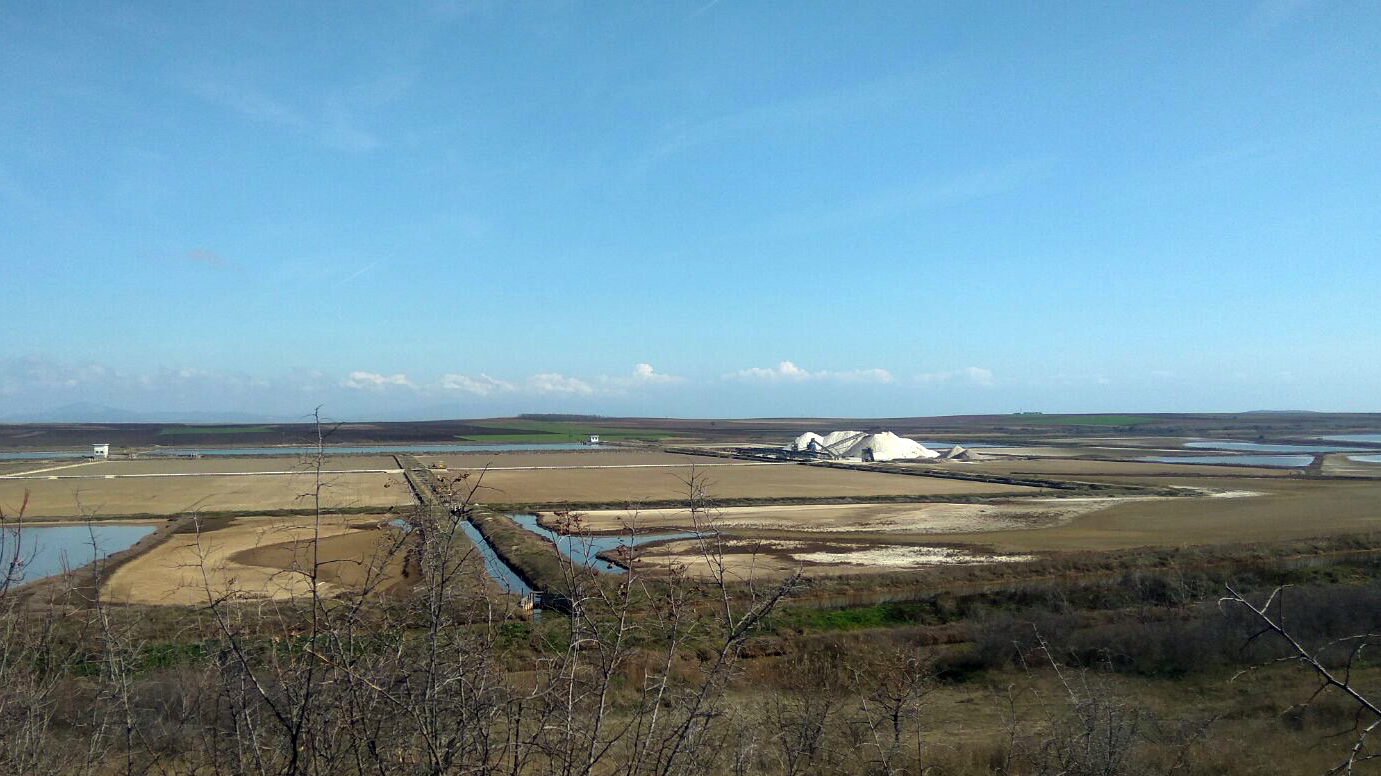
Mesis salt evaporation pond. Part of the basins (pans) can be seen

Mesi's salt evaporation pond are one of Greece's eight operational facilities, covering an area of 1,400 acres with an annual production capacity of 15,000 tons. Built in 1913 by the Bulgarians following their descent after the Treaty of Constantinople and the period of the Balkan wars, the salt pans are now managed by Hellinikes Alykes S.A.
