= Vitkoviće =

Vitkoviće Витковиће
- Village (Selo)
- Location within Serbia
- Coordinates: 42°58′N 20°32′E
- Country: Serbia
- District: Raška District
- Municipality: Novi Pazar

Area
  - Total: 8.49 km^{2} (3.28 sq mi)
- Elevation: 977 m (3,205 ft)

Population (2011)
  - Total: 36
  - Density: 4.2/km^{2} (11/sq mi)
- Time zone: UTC+1 (CET)
  - Summer (DST): UTC+2 (CEST)

Vitkoviće (Serbian Cyrillic: Витковиће) is a village located in the municipality of Novi Pazar, Serbia.
