= Skotoussa =

Skotoussa Σκοτούσσα
- Municipal unit
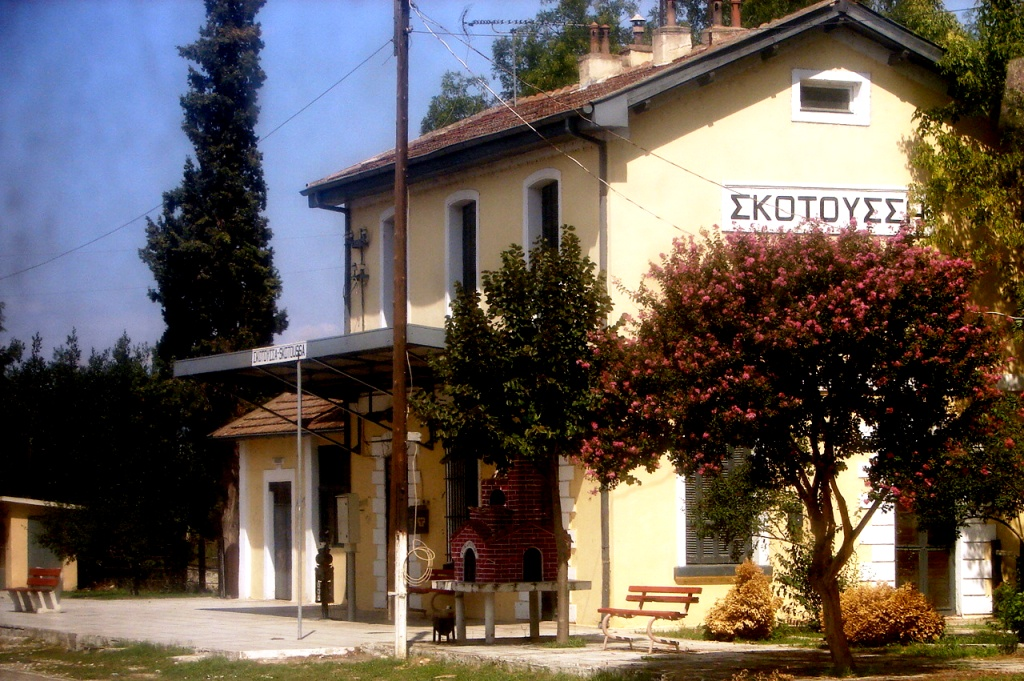
- Skotoussa train station

- Location within the regional unit

- Location within Greece
- Coordinates: 41°08′N 23°23′E
- Country: Greece
- Administrative region: Central Macedonia
- Regional unit: Serres
- Municipality: Irakleia

Area
  - Municipal unit: 99.4 km^{2} (38.4 sq mi)

Population (2021)
  - Municipal unit: 3,248
  - Municipal unit density: 32.7/km^{2} (84.6/sq mi)
  - Community: 795
- Time zone: UTC+2 (EET)
  - Summer (DST): UTC+3 (EEST)
- Vehicle registration: ΕΡ

Skotoussa (Greek: Σκοτούσσα, Medieval Greek: Προσάνικον, romanized: Prosanikon) is a village and a former municipality in the Serres regional unit, Greece. Population 3,248 (2021). Since the 2011 local government reform it is part of the municipality Irakleia, of which it is a municipal unit. The municipal unit has an area of 99.433 km^{2}.

== Transport ==
The settlement is served by Skotoussa railway station on the Thessaloniki-Alexandroupoli line, with daily services to Thessaloniki and Alexandroupolis.
