= A3 motorway (North Macedonia) =

Road in North Macedonia

A3

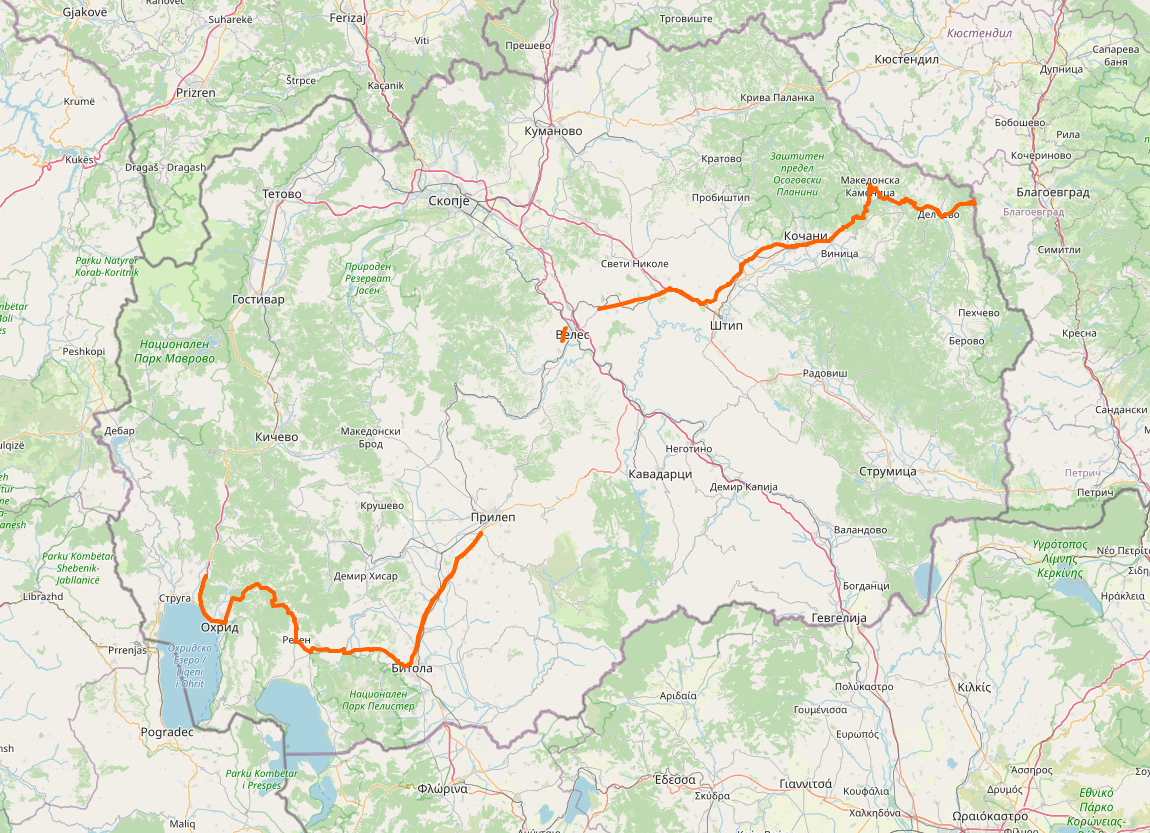

Route information
- Part of E65 E852
- Length: 310 km (190 mi)

Major junctions
- West end: Podmolje, Albanian border
- East end: Delčevo, Bulgarian border

Location
- Country: North Macedonia
- Major cities: Ohrid, Resen, Bitola, Prilep, Veles, Štip, Kočani, Delčevo

Highway system
- Transport in North Macedonia

The A3 motorway is a route in North Macedonia, that is only partly a divided motorway.

After the independence of North Macedonia, the roads were renumbered. A part of the M26 and the entire M27 were merged into the M-5. These road numbers have existed until September 30, 2011. On that day, the M-5 was renumbered A3. Currently, the A3 between Prilep and Bitola is being upgraded to a motorway. Completion is scheduled for 2027.
