= Gefyra, Thessaloniki =

Gefyra Γέφυρα
- Community
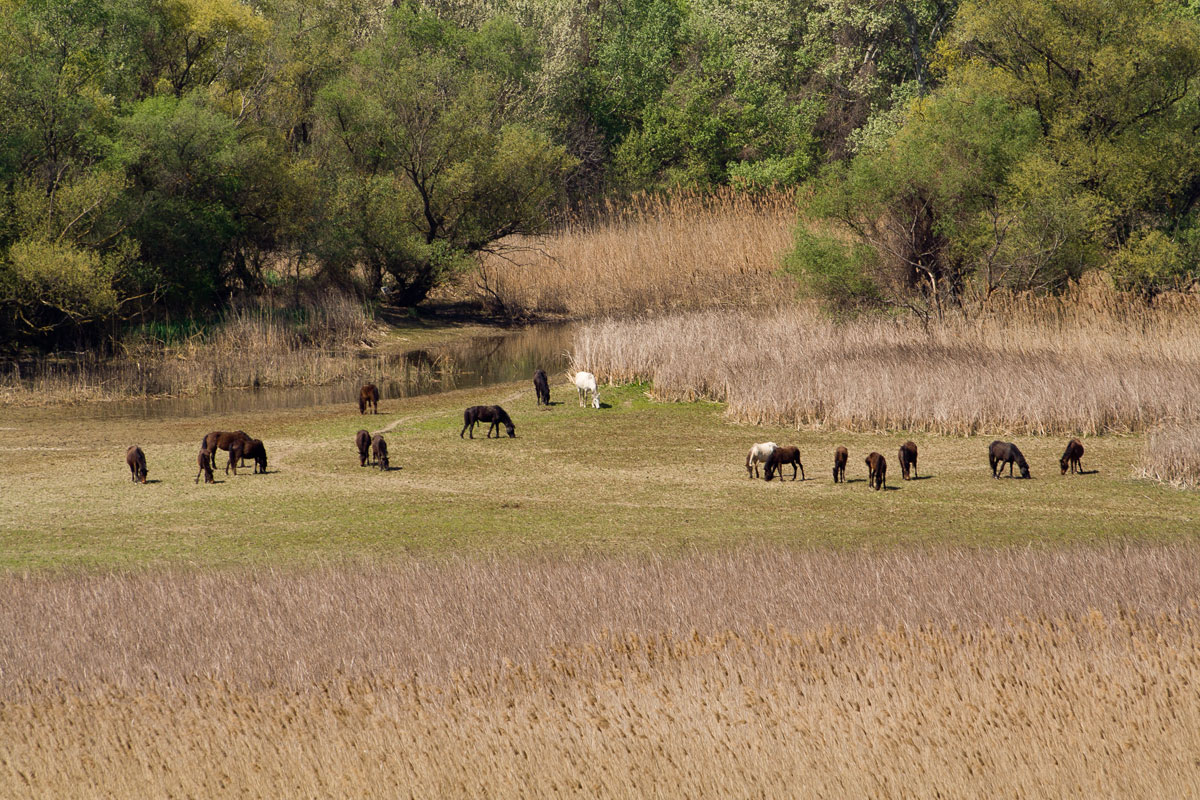
- Wild horses in Gefyra
- Interactive map of Gefyra
- Country: Greece
- Administrative region: Central Macedonia
- Regional unit: Thessaloniki
- Municipality: Chalkidona
- Municipal unit: Agios Athanasios

Area
  - Community: 29.836 km^{2} (11.520 sq mi)
- Elevation: 35 m (115 ft)

Population (2021)
  - Community: 2,782
  - Density: 93.24/km^{2} (241.5/sq mi)
- Time zone: UTC+2 (EET)
  - Summer (DST): UTC+3 (EEST)
- Postal code: 570 11
- Area code: +30-231
- Vehicle registration: NA to NX

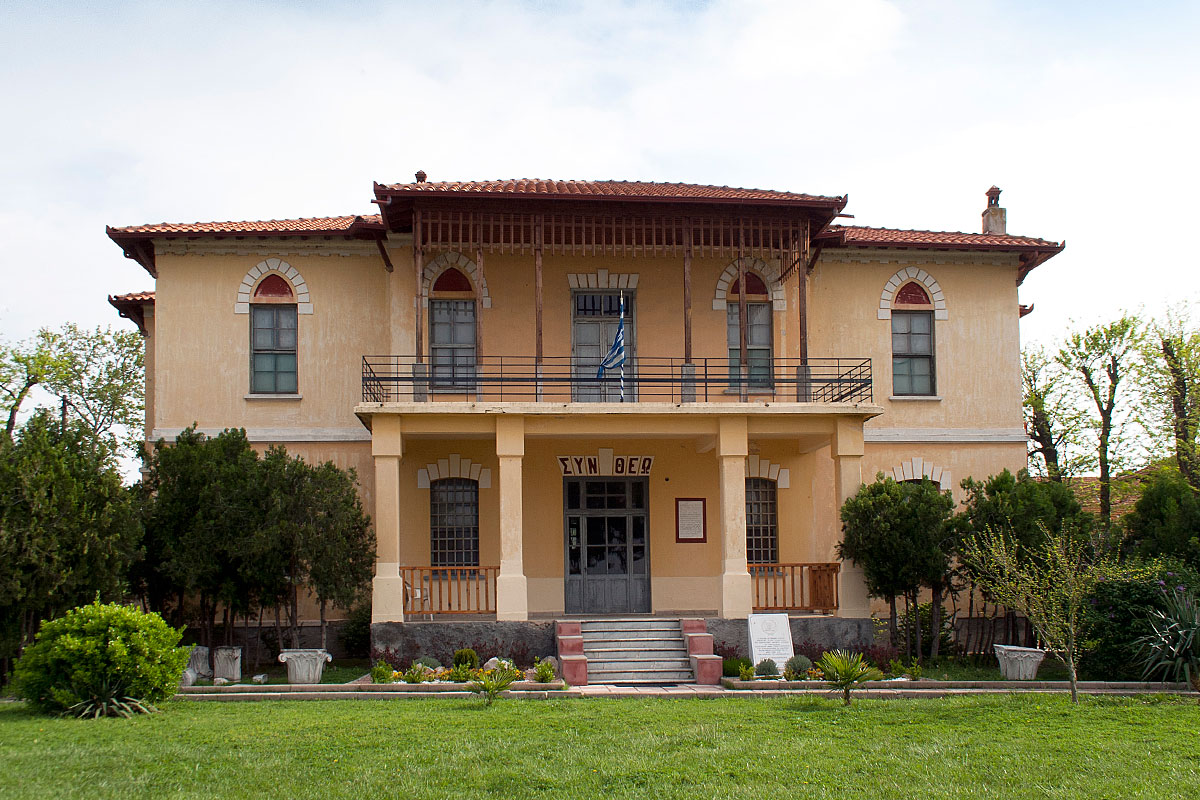
Balkan Wars museum

Gefyra (Greek: Γέφυρα, literally meaning "Bridge", until 1926 Τοψίν/Topsin, Bulgarian: Топчиево/Topchievo, Turkish: Topçin) is a village and a community of the Chalkidona municipality, about 20 km northwest from Thessaloniki.

Before the 2011 local government reform it was part of the municipality of Agios Athanasios, of which it was a municipal district. The 2021 census recorded 2,782 inhabitants in the community. The community of Gefyra covers an area of 29.836 km^{2}.

There is a highway junction near Gefyra, where the European route E75 and E86 meets.

== History ==
The village is the site of the surrender of the Ottoman garrison of Thessaloniki under Hasan Tahsin Pasha to the Greek army under Crown Prince Constantine during the First Balkan War (1912). The villa where the surrender took place now houses the Balkan Wars Museum.

== See also ==
- List of settlements in the Thessaloniki regional unit
