= Levaia =

Levaia Λεβαία
- Community
- Location within Greece
- Coordinates: 40°38′48″N 21°42′09″E
- Country: Greece
- Administrative region: West Macedonia
- Regional unit: Florina
- Municipality: Amyntaio
- Municipal unit: Filotas
- Elevation: 630 m (2,070 ft)

Population (2021)
  - Community: 660
- Time zone: UTC+2 (EET)
  - Summer (DST): UTC+3 (EEST)
- Vehicle registration: PA

Levaia (Greek: Λεβαία, before 1926: Έλλεβη – Ellevi, between 1926 and 1988: Λακκιά – Lakkia) is a village in the region of Florina, northern Greece. It belonged to the municipality of Filotas but after the application of the Kallikratis Plan in 2011 it got incorporated in the municipality of Amyntaio. According to the 2021 Greek census, the village had 660 inhabitants.

== Demographics ==
In statistics gathered by Vasil Kanchov in 1900, Elevi was populated by 700 Muslim Turks.

The 1920 Greek census recorded 986 people in the village, and 950 inhabitants (160 families) were Muslim in 1923. Following the Greek–Turkish population exchange, Greek refugee families in Elevi were from East Thrace (81), Asia Minor (102) and Pontus (52) in 1926. The 1928 Greek census recorded 1,002 village inhabitants. In 1928, the refugee families numbered 232 (973 people).
