= Ribarevine =

Ribarevine Рибаревина
- Village
- Location within Montenegro
- Coordinates: 42.994113°N 19.744689°E
- Country: Montenegro
- Municipality: Bijelo Polje

Population (2011)
  - Total: 383
- Time zone: UTC+1 (CET)
  - Summer (DST): UTC+2 (CEST)

Ribarevine (Serbian Cyrillic: Рибаревина), meaning place of fishermen in Older Slavic, is the name of a major crossroads in Montenegro, based in the north of the country in the Bijelo Polje municipality. Situated close to Bijelo Polje, it connects the northern Montenegrin towns of Bijelo Polje, Pljevlja and Žabljak with both southern Montenegro (Podgorica and the sea), and northeastern Montenegro (Berane district), hence the border crossings into Serbia including Kosovo.

== Demographics ==
According to the 2011 census, its population was 383.

Ethnicity in 2011
Ethnicity	Number	Percentage
Serbs	262	68.4%
Montenegrins	105	27.4%
other/undeclared	16	4.2%
Total	383	100%
