= European route E86 =

Road in trans-European E-road network

E86

Major junctions
- West end: Krystallopigi
- East end: Gefyra

Location
- Countries: Greece

Highway system
- International E-road network; A Class; B Class

European route E86 is an intermediate Class A European route in Northern Greece, that runs from Krystallopigi to Gefyra (near Thessaloniki). Introduced in 1983, it is part of the International E-road network, a network of main roads in Europe.

== History ==
The E86 was introduced with the current E-road network, which was finalised on 15 November 1975 and implemented on 15 March 1983.

The E86 originally ran from Krystallopigi in the west to Thessaloniki in the east, replacing part of the E20 from the old E-road network, which existed from 1950 to 1983: on 12 September 1986, the eastern end of the E86 was cut back from Thessaloniki to its current terminus at Gefyra.

== Route ==
According to the 2016 revision of the European Agreement on Main International Traffic Arteries (AGR), the E86 currently runs from Krystallopigi in the west to Gefyra (near Thessaloniki) in the east, via Florina and Vevi: the western end of the E86 is at the border with Albania, which currently has no E-roads.

In relation to the national road network, the E86 currently follows (in order, from west to east):

- The EO2 road, from Krystallopigi to Florina
- The A27 expressway, from Florina to Levaia
- The EO2 road, from Arnissa to Gefyra

The E86 runs concurrently with the E65 on the A27 segment. The E86 also connects with the E75 at Gefyra.

== See also ==
- International E-road network in Greece
