= Niki, Florina =

Village in Macedonia, Greece

Niki Νίκη
- Community

- Location within Greece
- Coordinates: 40°54′33″N 21°25′13″E
- Country: Greece
- Geographic region: Macedonia
- Administrative region: Western Macedonia
- Regional unit: Florina
- Municipality: Florina
- Municipal unit: Kato Kleines

Population (2021)
  - Community: 209
- Time zone: UTC+2 (EET)
  - Summer (DST): UTC+3 (EEST)

Níki (Greek: Νίκη, before 1926: Νεγκοτσάνη – Negkotsani; Macedonian and Bulgarian: Негочани, Negočani or Negochani) is a village situated in the Florina regional unit of Greece, along the border with North Macedonia. The village is located 14 km (8.7 mi) north of Florina at the Medžitlija-Níki border crossing. Its name in Greek means victory. The main road through Niki connects the border crossing with the city of Kozani and forms a part of the E65 route.

The village was first mentioned in an Ottoman defter of 1468, where it is listed under the name of Negočani and described as having 203 households. In 1481, the number had declined to 112 households. The village produced vines, flax, hemp, honey, and swine; and possessed mills and a market.

The 1920 Greek census recorded 562 people in the village, and 86 inhabitants (16 families) were Muslim in 1923. Following the Greek–Turkish population exchange, Greek refugee families in Negkotsani were from Pontus (18) in 1926. The 1928 Greek census recorded 662 village inhabitants. In 1928, the refugee families numbered 18 (77 people).

The population of the village in 2021 was 209.
