= Antigonos, Florina =

Antigonos
- Community
- Location within Greece
- Coordinates: 40°38′24″N 21°45′42″E
- Country: Greece
- Geographic region: Macedonia
- Administrative region: Western Macedonia
- Regional unit: Florina
- Municipality: Amyntaio
- Municipal unit: Filotas

Population (2021)
  - Community: 374
- Time zone: UTC+2 (EET)
  - Summer (DST): UTC+3 (EEST)

Antigonos (Greek: Αντίγονος, before 1928: Κιοσελέρ – Kioseler) is a village in Florina Regional Unit, Macedonia, Greece.

The 1920 Greek census recorded 1,174 people in the village, and 1,100 inhabitants were Muslim in 1923. Following the Greek–Turkish population exchange, Greek refugee families in Kioseler were from East Thrace (13), Asia Minor (129) and Pontus (6) in 1926. The 1928 Greek census recorded 619 village inhabitants. In 1928, the refugee families numbered 148 (595 people).
