= International E-road network in Greece =

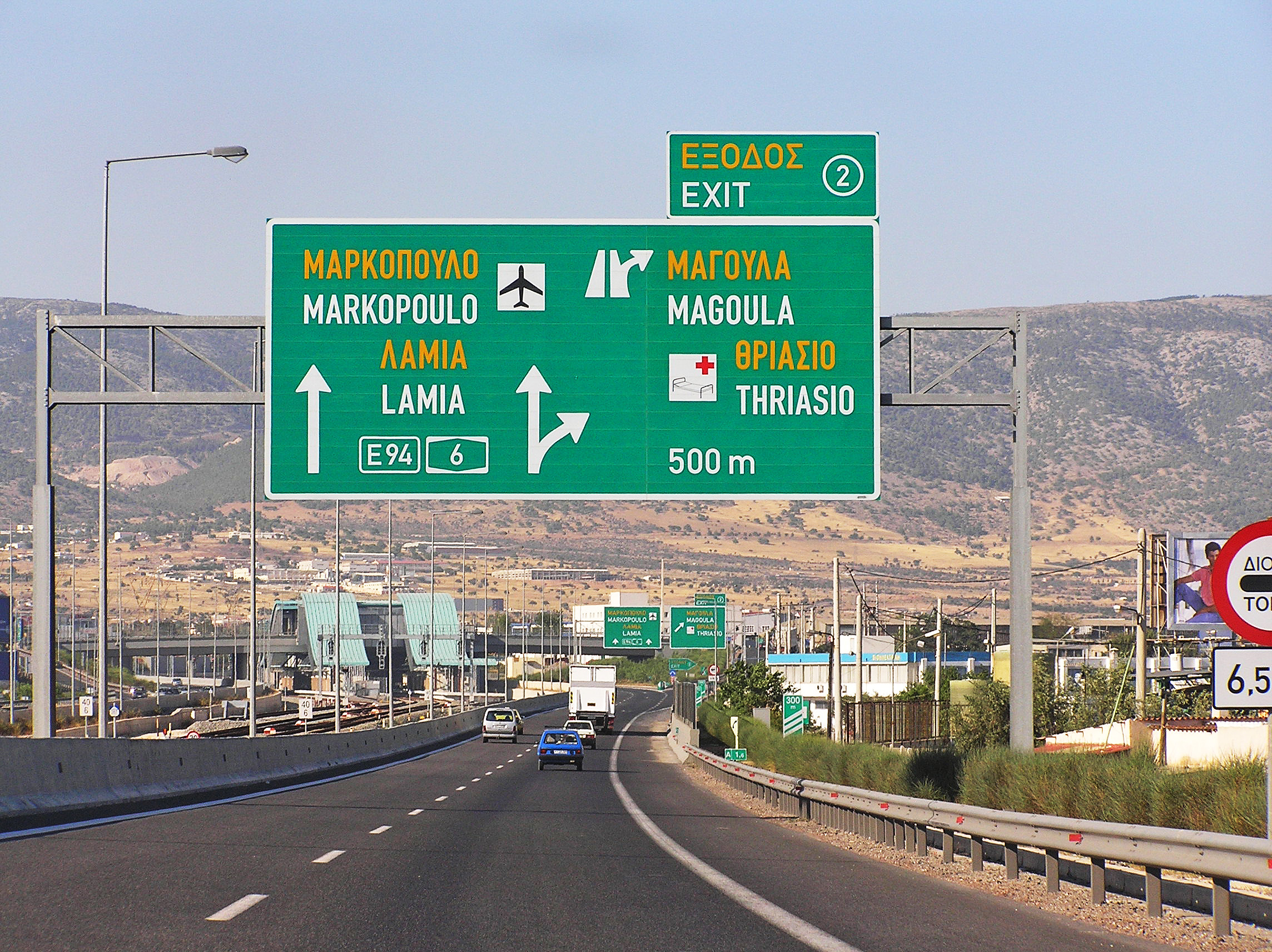
In Greece, E-road numbers appear on motorway signs.

The International E-road network has covered Greece since the Declaration on the Construction of Main International Traffic Arteries, which established the first E-road network in the country, was signed on 16 September 1950.

In 1975, the European Agreement on Main International Traffic Arteries (AGR) created the current E-road network, based on a system of north–south and east–west reference roads: although the AGR came into force in 1983, Greece officially migrated from the 1950 Declaration to the AGR in 1989. A significant change to the current E-road network affecting Greece was agreed in 1985, coming into force in 1986.

== Current network (1989–present) ==
The current E-road network was established by the European Agreement on Main International Traffic Arteries (AGR), which was finalised at Geneva on 15 November 1975, and came into force on 15 March 1983. Greece adopted the current network on 9 January 1989, when it acceded to the AGR.

There are currently fourteen E-roads within Greece, of which nine are Class A, and five Class B: Places in italics are where the motorway or national road numbers change, but do not appear in the current consolidated text of the AGR: the A3 motorway is also promoted as being part of the E65, but the AGR has not yet been amended to allow the E65 to follow the A3.

Class A roads
Road	Route
E55	Ferry: Brindisi, Italy – Igoumenitsa; EO: Igoumenitsa – Nea Thesi; EO19: Nea Thesi – Preveza; EO: Preveza – Actium; A52: Actium – Lake Amvrakia; A5: Lake Amvrakia – Missolonghi – Rio – Patras – Pyrgos; EO9: Pyrgos – Kalo Nero; EO9a: Kalo Nero – Tsakona; A7: Tsakona – Kalamata; EO82: within Kalamata
E65	EO3: Niki (border with North Macedonia); A27: Niki – Florina; EO: Florina – Vevi – Ptolemaida; A27: Ptolemaida – Kozani; EO: around Kozani; EO4: around Kozani; EO: around Kozani; EO3: Kozani – Larissa – Domokos – Lamia; EO: around Lamia; EO1: Lamia – Roditsa; A1: Roditsa – Thermopylae; EO: Thermopylae – Bralos; EO27: Bralos – Amfissa; EO48: Amfissa – Chrisso; EO: Chrisso – Itea – Nafpaktos; EO48: Nafpaktos – Antirrio; A5: Antirrio – Rio; A8: Rio – Aigio – Corinth; A7: Corinth – Tripoli – Kalamata; EO82: within Kalamata; Ferry: Kalamata – Kissamos; A90 / EO90: Kissamos – Chania
E75	A1: Evzonoi (border with North Macedonia) – Chalastra; A1 / A2: Kleidi - Chalastra – Thessaloniki (branch); A1: Kleidi – Larissa – Almyros – Lamia – Athens – Piraeus; Ferry: Piraeus – Chania; A90 / EO90: Chania – Heraklion – Agios Nikolaos – Sitia
E79	EO63: Promachonas (border with Bulgaria) – Promachonas; A25: Promachonas – Serres – Lagkadas; A2: Lagkadas – Efkarpia; EO2: Efkarpia – Thessaloniki
E85	EO: Ormenio (border with Bulgaria) – Kastanies; EO51: Kastanies – Didymoteicho – Mandra; A21: Mandra – Provatonas; EO51: Provatonas – Ardani; EO2: Ardani – Alexandroupolis
E86	EO2: Krystallopigi (border with Albania) – Florina; EO: Florina – Vevi – Antigonos; EO: Antigonos – Arnissa; EO2: Arnissa – Gefyra
E90	Ferry: Brindisi, Italy – Igoumenitsa; A2: Igoumenitsa – Ioannina – Kozani – Thessaloniki – Alexandroupolis – Kipoi (border with Turkey)
E92	Ferry: Brindisi, Italy – Igoumenitsa; A2: Igoumenitsa – Ioannina – Kipoureio; A3: Kipoureio – Trikala; EO6: Trikala – Larissa; EO: Larissa Southern Bypass; EO1a; A1: Larissa – Velestino; EO6: Velestino – Volos
E94	A8: Corinth – Elefsina; A6: Elefsina – Metamorfosi – Koropi (via Attiki Odos, bypassing Athens)

Class B roads
Road	Route
E853	EO20: Ioannina – Kalpaki; EO22: Kalpaki – Kakavia (border with Albania)
E951	A5: Pedini (Note: Previously Ioannina until the opening of the A5.) – Arta – Kouvaras; EO5: Kouvaras – Agrinio – Missolonghi
E952	A52: Aktio – Vonitsa – Lake Amvrakia (Note: Previously Amfilochia until the opening of the A52.); A5: Lake Amvrakia – Kouvaras; EO5: Kouvaras – Agrinio; EO38: Agrinio – Karpenisi – Lamia
E961	EO39: Tripoli – Sparta – Gytheio
E962	EO3: Elefsina – Thebes

=== Pre-accession development ===
The current version of the E-road network in Greece came into force on 12 September 1986, after a major revision to Annex I of the AGR was agreed on 11 December 1985: the E-road network in Greece, as originally agreed in November 1975 and implemented in March 1983, contained many differences from the 1985 amendments:

- The E65 crossed the Gulf of Corinth via the former Aigio–Itea ferry, instead of the Rio–Antirrio ferry: the section from Rio to Aigio was part of the old E92, while the section from Tripoli to the E55 at Tsakona was part of the old E952. The E65 also terminated at Gytheio, instead of the E75 at Chania (via Kalamata and Kissamos).
- The E85 ran from the then-closed border crossing with Bulgaria at Makaza to Komotini, instead of from Ormenio to Alexandroupolis (via Kastanies and Didymoteicho).
- The E86 terminated at Thessaloniki, instead of Gefyra.
- The current E92 used to be the E950, and terminated at Ioannina instead of Igoumenitsa.
- The E853 used to be the E851.
- The E951 used to be the E957.
- The current E952 used to be the old E951, and terminated at Amfilochia instead of Aktio (via Vonitsa).
- The E961 used to be the Tripoli–Gytheio section of the E65.
- The E962 did not exist.

=== Post-accession changes ===
Nearly all changes to the E-road network in Greece since January 1989 were a result of new bypasses and motorways (such as the A2 Egnatia Odos), many of which did not affect the basic itinerary of the E-roads. As of October 2024, there were three major post-accession changes to the E-road network affecting Greece:

- The E94 was rerouted at Elefsina to bypass Athens and extended towards Koropi, when the A6 Attiki Odos opened in stages from 2001 to 2003: this is because road signs show the A6 as being part of the E94.
- The E951's northern end was moved from Ioannina to Pedini on 3 August 2017, following the opening of the A5 motorway from Perdika to the A2.
- The E952 was rerouted via Lake Amvrakia instead of Amfilochia on 22 July 2022, when a section of the A52 motorway opened between the A5 near Katouna and Loutraki, avoiding Amfilochia entirely.

=== Proposed changes ===
The E65 is planned to be realigned away from the EO3 between Kozani and Lamia, following the completion of the A3 in July 2026. The realignment requires amending Annex I, because the revised route will no longer serve Larissa and Domokos (as currently defined): it instead follows the A2 (Egnatia Odos) towards Kipoureio, and then the A3 itself towards Anthili via Trikala, where it joins the A1.

If the A5 is extended from Pedini to Kakavia, the E853 will be rerouted via the extension and connect with the E90, E92 and E951 at Pedini instead of Ioannina.

== Original network (1950–1989) ==
Greece acceded to the 1950 Declaration on the Construction of Main International Traffic Arteries on 1 July 1952: the original E-road network in Greece consisted of eight E-roads, with the E5 and E20 overlapping between Gefyra and Lagyna via Thessaloniki.

The following table lists the original E-road network, as it was when Greece acceded to the AGR in 1989: places in italics are intersections with European routes that did not appear in the 1950 Declaration and its amendments.

1950–1989 E-road network in Greece
Road	Route
E5s	Evzonoi (border with Yugoslavia (Note: The border is now with North Macedonia, which left Yugoslavia on 25 September 1991.)) – Gefyra – Thessaloniki – Lagyna – Kavala – Alexandroupolis – Feres – Peplos – Kipoi (border with Turkey)
E19	Igoumenitsa (Note: Previously Kakavia and the border with Albania until 17 November 1962.) – Ioannina – Filippiada – Arta – Agrinio – Antirrio – Rio – Corinth
E20	Krystallopigi (border with Albania) – Florina – Vevi – Edessa – Chalkidona – Gefyra – Thessaloniki – Lagyna – Serres – Promachonas (for Bulgaria)
E87	Ioannina – Trikala – Larissa - Velestino – Volos
E88	Filippiada – Preveza
E89	Rio – Patras
E90	Vevi – Kozani – Larissa (Note: Added on 23 September 1966.)
E92	Chalkidona – Veria – Kozani – Larissa – Velestino – Almyros – Lamia – Athens – Corinth – Argos – Kalamata
E97	Makaza (border with Bulgaria, reopened 2013) – Komotini

=== Post-accession changes ===
The original network was modified many times during its existence from 16 September 1950 to 15 November 1975. On 6 June 1952 (one month before Greece's accession to the 1950 Declaration), the E5 was extended from Alexandroupolis to Kipoi and the border with Turkey. The E106, between Ioannina and Igoumenitsa, existed from 30 December 1958 to 17 November 1962, when it was replaced by the realigned E19 on 17 November 1962.

On 23 September 1966, the E5 in Greece became the E5^{S}, due to a new northern branch from Niš, Yugoslavia (now Serbia) to Silivri, Turkey; the E90 was extended from Kozani to Larissa to overlap with the E92; and the E92 between Larissa and Lamia was diverted via Almyros, following the EO1 and overlapping with the E87 between Larissa and Velestino. Finally, the E97 was extended into Greece from Makaza to Komotini on 7 November 1967, although the border crossing with Bulgaria was closed from the end of World War II to 9 September 2013.

== Signage ==
Current E-road marker in Greece

E-road markers in Greece consist of a green rectangle with a white border and white numerals: the marker design is similar to that used in Germany. The current design was introduced in 2003, as part of the Guidelines for the Design of Road Projects (Greek: Οδηγία Μελετών Οδικών Έργων, ΟΜΟΕ): it replaced a similar design introduced in 1974, which had a hyphen between the prefix and the number. E-road numbers mainly appear on motorway signs, since E-roads are designed to follow the high quality roads like motorways.

== See also ==
- Highways in Greece
- National roads in Greece
