= European route E853 =

Road in trans-European E-road network

E853

Route information
- Length: 61 km (38 mi)

Major junctions
- South end: Ioannina
- North end: Kakavia

Location
- Countries: Greece

Highway system
- International E-road network; A Class; B Class

European route E853, formerly the E851 from 1983 to 1986, is a Class B European route in the Greek region of Epirus, running from the regional capital of Ioannina to the Kakavia border crossing with Albania. Introduced in 1983, it is part of the International E-road network, a network of main roads in Europe.

== History ==
The national road between Ioannina and Kakavia (which at the time followed the old EO28 and EO29 roads) used to be part of the original E-road network from 16 September 1950 to 17 November 1962, with the E19 running from the Albanian border in the north to Corinth in the south, via Arta and Rio. The road was removed from the old network, when the northern end of E19 was rerouted from Ioannina to Igoumenitsa, replacing the short-lived E106.

The Ioannina–Kakavia national road became part of the E-road network again, with the introduction of the original E851 on 15 March 1983. On 12 September 1986, the original E851 became the E853, and the E851 number was reused for the E-road from Petrovac to Pristina, via Prizren but currently skipping Albania.

Before the arrival of the A2 motorway (Egnatia Odos) in Ioannina, the southern end of the E853 used to be at the western shore of Lake Pamvotida, where the E90 and E92 used to follow the EO6: after the A2 opened, the southern end was extended to Bafra, south of the city.

== Route ==
According to the 2016 revision of the European Agreement on Main International Traffic Arteries (AGR), the E853 currently runs from Ioannina in the south to Kakavia in the north: the northern end of the E853 is at the border with Albania, which currently has no E-roads.

In relation to the national road network, the E853 currently follows (in order, from south to north):

- The EO20 road, from Ioannina to Kalpaki
- The EO22 road, from Kalpaki to Kakavia

The E853 connects with the E90 and the E92 at Ioannina.

== Planned changes ==
If the A5 motorway is extended from Pedini to Kakavia, the E853 will be rerouted via the extension and connect with the E90, E92 and E951 at Pedini instead of Ioannina.

== See also ==
- International E-road network in Greece
