= A5 motorway (Greece) =

Controlled-access highway

A5 motorway
- Αυτοκινητόδρομος Α5
- Ionia Odos; Ιονία Οδός
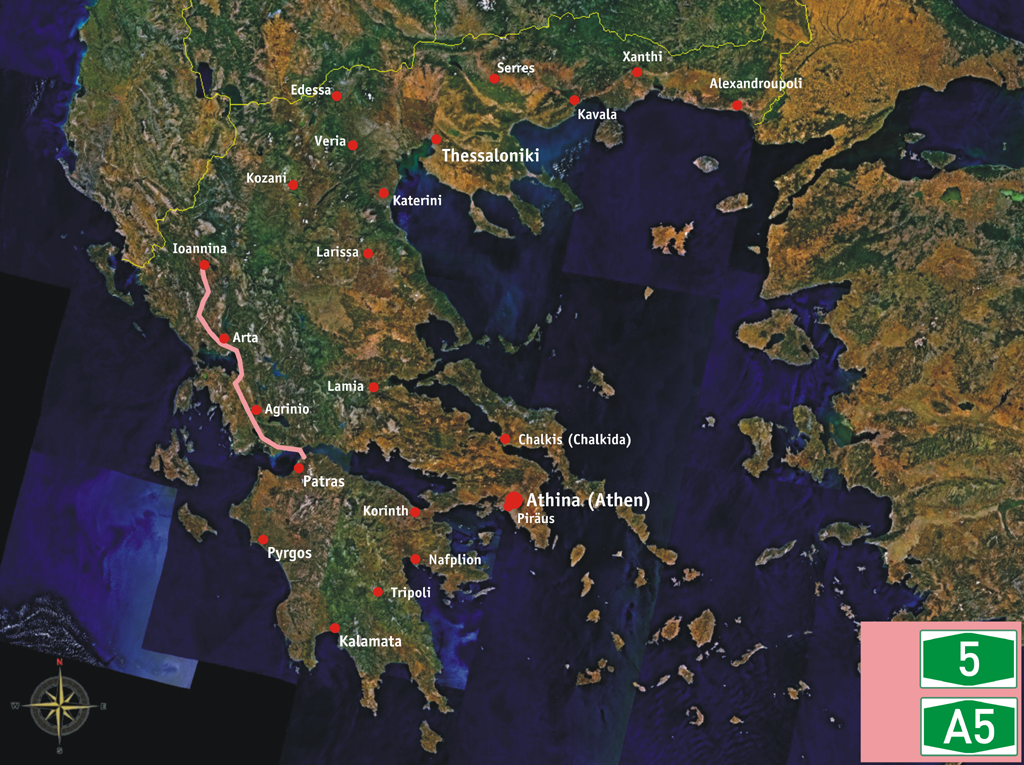

Route information
- Part of E55 (Pyrgos–Lake Amvrakia), E65 (Rio–Antirrio), E951 (Kouvaras–Ioannina), and E952 (Kouvaras–Lake Amvrakia)
- Length: 196 km (122 mi)

Major junctions
- South end: Pyrgos
- North end: Ioannina (A2)

Location
- Country: Greece
- Regions: Western Greece; Epirus
- Primary destinations: Pyrgos; Patras; Rio; Antirrio; Missolonghi; Arta; Ioannina

Highway system
- Highways in Greece; Motorways; National roads
← A3	→ A52

The A5 motorway, also known as the Ionia Odos (Greek: Ιόνια Οδός), is a controlled-access highway in western Greece, which starts at Ioannina and it follows the western coastline of mainland Greece down to the Gulf of Corinth. At Rio, it crosses the gulf via the Rio–Antirrio bridge and is connected with the A8 at an interchange near Patras. The Patras - Pyrgos section of the motorway is now considered part of the A8 motorway and will eventually extend to Tsakona near Kalamata. Another extension north to Kakavia at the border with Albania, is in the planning stage.

In August 2017, the last section under construction (Perdika-Ioannina) was completed and delivered to traffic by the Greek Minister of Infrastructure, Transport and Network, making Ionia Odos a fully operational motorway. It is the second major north–south road connection after the A1 motorway and is also part of the trans-Balkanic Adriatic–Ionian motorway and the European routes E55 and E951.

The Ionia Odos motorway was one of the most challenging construction projects in Greece, as it spans a big part of Western Greece and because of its location on the foothills of the Pindus mountain range. After its completion in August 2017, it reduced travel times between Antirrio and Ioannina to 1 hour and 40 minutes, down from 3 hours and 30 minutes and will provide a boost to the economy of the regions it spans (Western Greece and Epirus).

== Ionia Odos ==
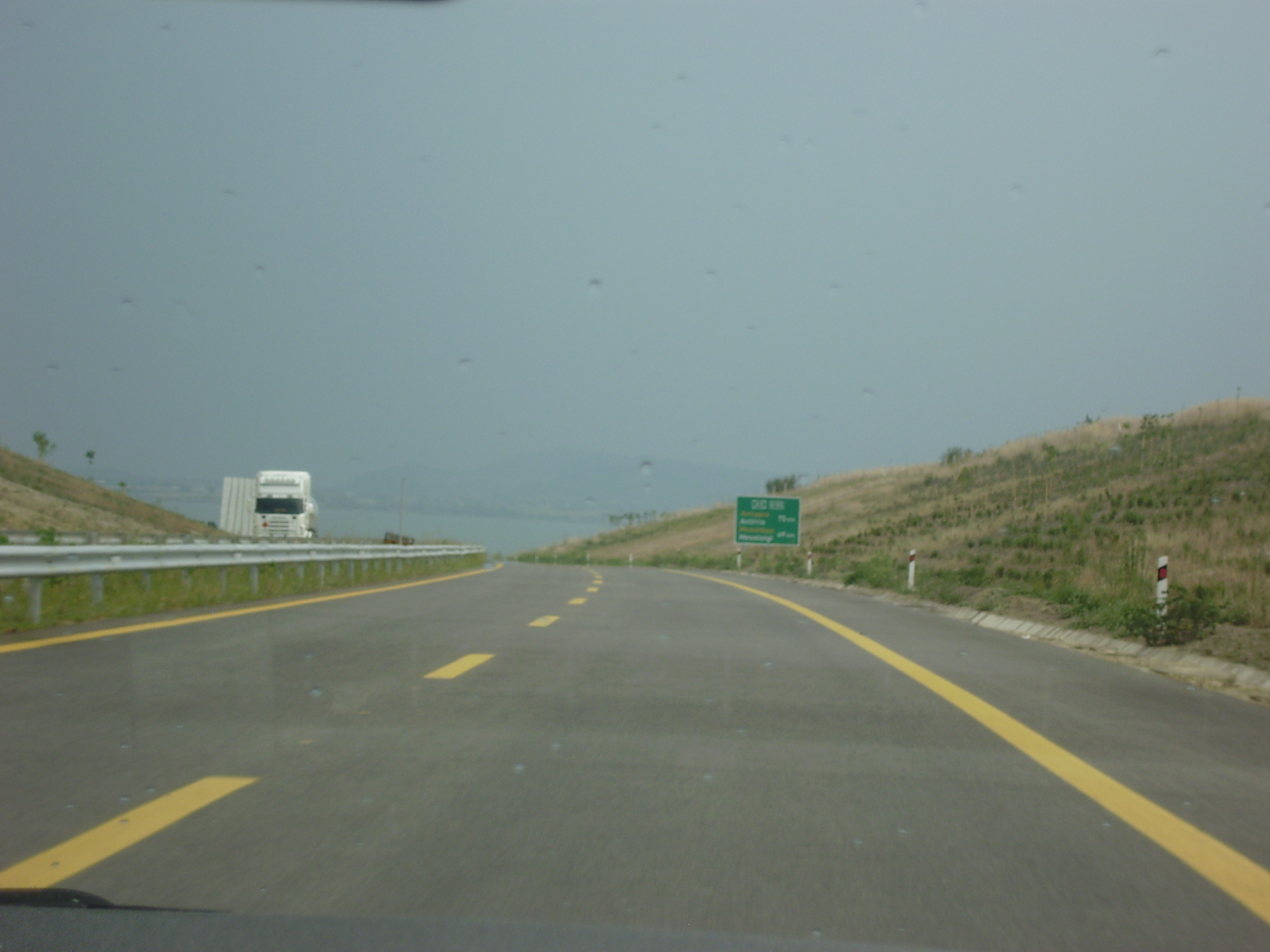
Ionia Odos (southbound direction), just after the Kouvaras interchange

=== Brief presentation ===
The motorway consists of:

- 196 kilometres of motorway, with 2 lanes in each direction, emergency lane and Jersey barrier separation
- 19 interchanges
- 133 overpasses and underpasses
- 4 twin-tube tunnels
- 24 bridges
- 4 main and 5 lateral toll stations
- 5 rest areas (4 in both directions)

=== Rio–Antirrio bridge ===
Construction of the Rio–Antirrio bridge, the world's longest fully suspended cable-stayed bridge, began in 1998, more than 100 years after a first proposal by then-prime minister Charilaos Trikoupis. The bridge was inaugurated on 7 August 2004, a week before the opening of the 2004 Summer Olympics in Athens.

=== Agrinio and Arta bypasses ===
With a length of 33 km, the Agrinio bypass was the first major segment of the northern A5 section to be completed. While construction had begun in 2002/03, it was fully put into service in May 2009. Starting from Aitoliko, the road bypasses the largest city and economical center of the Aetolia-Acarnania prefecture, Agrinio and ends in Kouvaras. It largely replaced the 12 km longer National Road 5. On July 28, 2015, a 4,5 km segment before the Aitoliko interchange became operational. This segment features the Ioannina-Antirrio carriageway, with the Antirrio-Ioannina carriageway being under construction where the old road was. The latter was moved eastwards in order to make room for the construction of the motorway and the traffic is diverted there.

The 17 km Arta bypass begins from Sellades near Arta and ends at Filippiada, near the border with the prefecture of Preveza. Its first part (Arta north interchange - Filippiada was opened in 2003 and the second part (Sellades/Arta south interchange - Arta north interchange) was opened in April 2011, with the bridge of the Arta north interchange being inaugurated on 22 November 2013.

=== Rest of the motorway - construction progress ===
As of December 2016, the 25 km Kouvaras interchange - Amfilochia interchange (Amfilochia bypass) segment has been completed. It should have been opened by July 2016, but because of landslides just before the Amfilochia interchange, it was opened on 27 December 2016 by the minister Christos Spirtzis. Also, the 37 km long section Kampi (Filippiada interchange) - Avgo was opened to traffic on 22 February 2017 by the minister of infrastructure Christos Spirtzis, however without the connection with the A2 motorway (Egnatia Odos), which was completed in August 2017. The latter was one of the most difficult motorway segments under construction in Greece because of the rugged mountainous terrain along its route. The most important tunnel of the motorway, the Klokova Tunnel, has been excavated and other works are undergoing. The 37 km section Klokova-Kefalovryso was opened to traffic on 12 April 2017 (without some of the interchanges, which are ready by August 2017). In early September 2016, It was announced that the rest of the expropriation works were successfully settled with the house owners receiving compensations for their respective areas, thus allowing full construction of the road.

=== Nea Odos consortium ===
In late 2006, construction and maintenance of the motorway's northern, Ionia Odos, section from Ioannina to the Rio intersection has been granted to the Greek-Spanish "Nea Odos" consortium, which is also responsible for the maintenance of the Athens–Skarfeia (near Lamia) section of the A1 Motorway. The consortium, consisting of construction firms GEK Group of Companies SA, Terna SA, Cintra SA, and Grupo ACS, will build and operate the road, receiving toll fees for 30 years, while investing a combined €1.15 billion in the project. The rest of the total €1.4 billion funds will be provided by the European Union and the Greek government. Construction, undertaken by the Euroionia Joint Venture (Terna SA, Dragados SA and Ferrovial SA) finally started in 2008 with a completion date of 72 months. The bill was ratified on March 28, 2007.

In 2010, it was expected that the full length of the motorway would be completed by the end of 2013. However, the consortium's economical problems led to the construction being stopped in 2011. Construction works resumed in April 2013, and the Antitrion - Ioannina section was finally completed in 2017.

Planning was approved in December 2024 to extend the Ionia Odos north to the border with Albania.

== Exit list ==
The exits of the main northern section of the A5 motorway:

Regional unit	Exit	Name	Destinations	Notes
Ioannina	18	Ioannina interchange	to Igoumenitsa, Thessaloniki	
Ioannina	17	Avgo		
Ioannina	16	Terovo		
Preveza	15	Gorgomylos		
Arta	14	Ammotopos		
Arta	13	Filippiada/Preveza	Greek National Road 5	
Arta	12	Arta south	Greek National Road 30	
Arta	11A	Kompoti	Greek National Road 5	
Aetolia-Acarnania	11	Amfilochia	Greek National Road 5	
Aetolia-Acarnania	10	Amvrakia interchange	to Aktio	
Aetolia-Acarnania	9	Kouvaras / Agrinio (North)	Greek National Road 5	
Aetolia-Acarnania	8	Rigani		
Aetolia-Acarnania	7	Angelokastro	Greek National Road 40	
Aetolia-Acarnania	6	Agios Ilias		
Aetolia-Acarnania	5	Chaliki / Agrinio (South)	Greek National Road 5	
Aetolia-Acarnania	4	Messolonghi	Greek National Road 5	
Aetolia-Acarnania	3	Evinochori		
Aetolia-Acarnania	2	Gavrolimni	Greek National Road 5	
Aetolia-Acarnania	1	Antirrio	, ferry to Rio	
Achaea		Rio-Port	, ferry to Antirrio	
Achaea		Rio interchange	to Athens	

== Patras bypass ==
The Patras bypass was the first segment of Olympia Odos that was put into service. Planning of the bypass began in the 1980s, but construction did not begin until the 1990s. It passes east of the city, through the foothills of the Panachaiko mountain, and consists of several tunnels and bridges. In October 2002, the bypass was opened to traffic. As a result, traffic in downtown Patras has significantly decreased.

Largely following the course of National Road 9, the Patras bypass in early years was signposted as part of a new, separate Motorway 9. Later it was reassigned to the then-planned trans-Peloponnese Motorway 8, before it was considered a part of the Adriatic–Ionian A5.

Signage of the Patras bypass
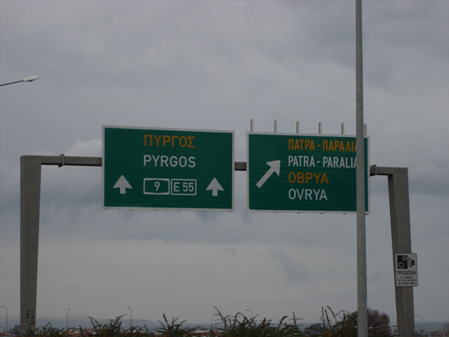
Old road sign depicting Patras-Paralia exit as part of a new Motorway 9 in 2006

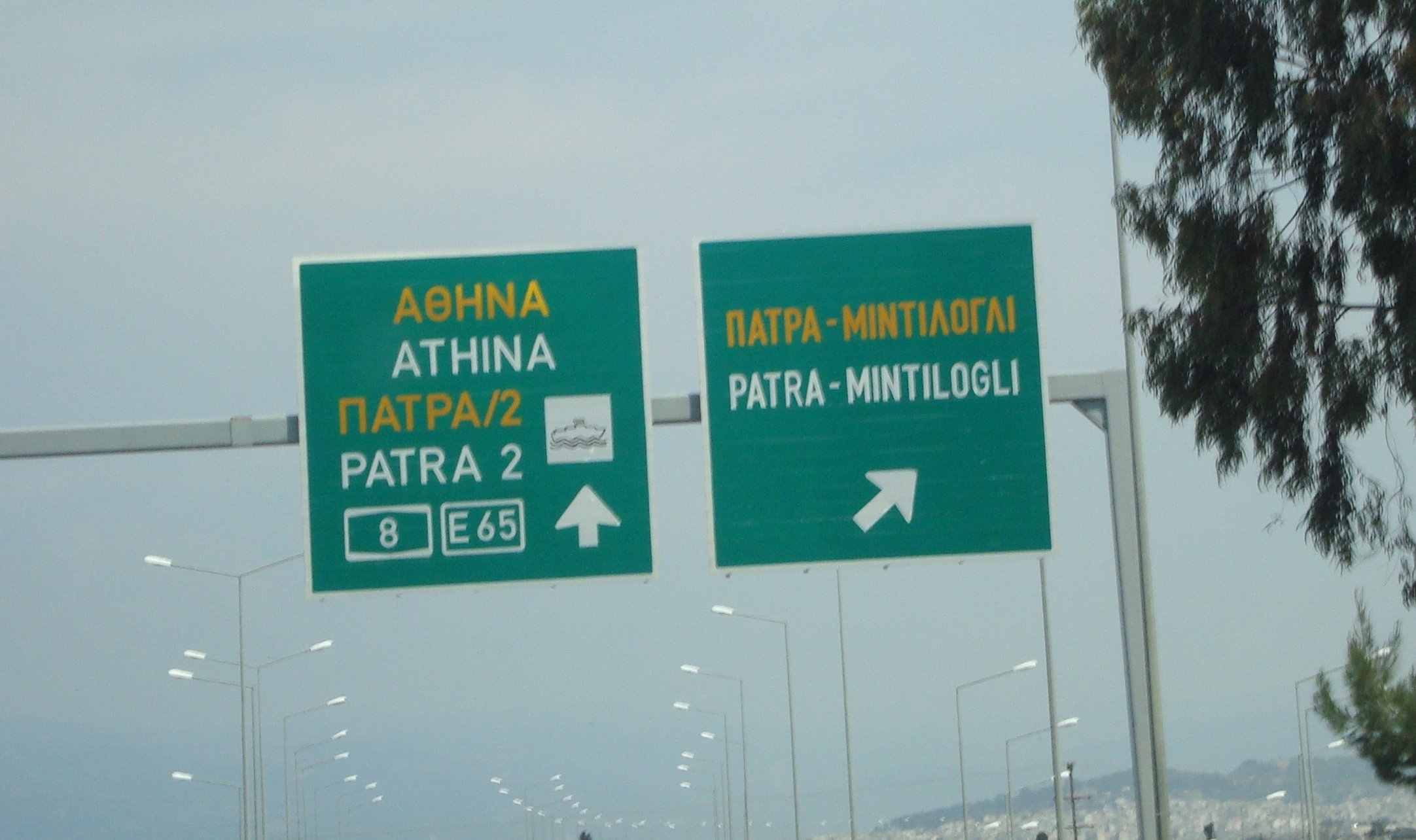
Old road sign depicting Patras-Mintologli exit as part of Motorway 8 in 2011

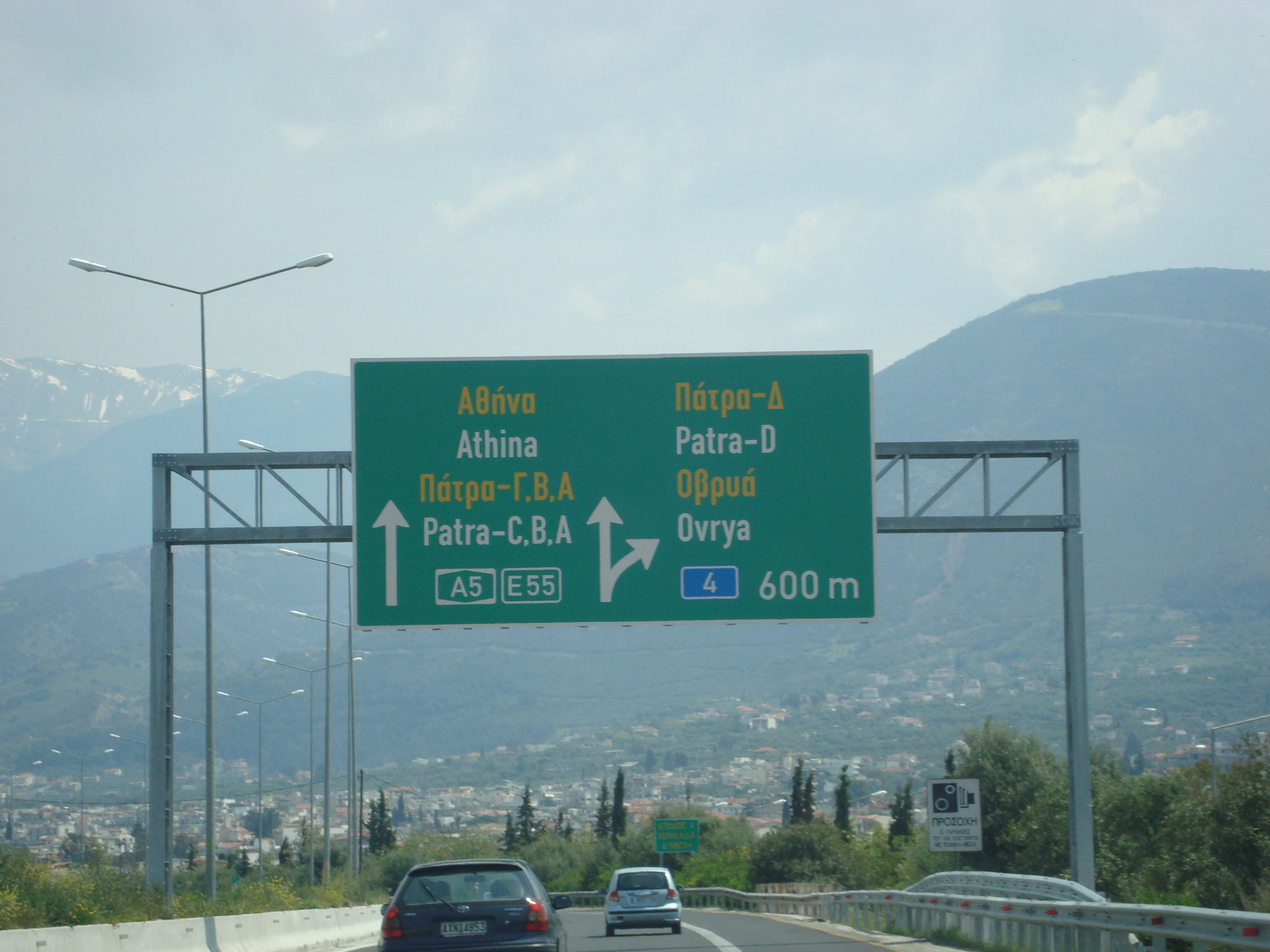
New road sign depicting Patras-Paralia exit as part of the A5 in 2011

=== Olympia Odos consortium ===
Construction and maintenance of the Patras bypass Olympia Odos section has been mandated to the "Olympia Odos" consortium which also built the A8 Motorway.

=== Exit list ===
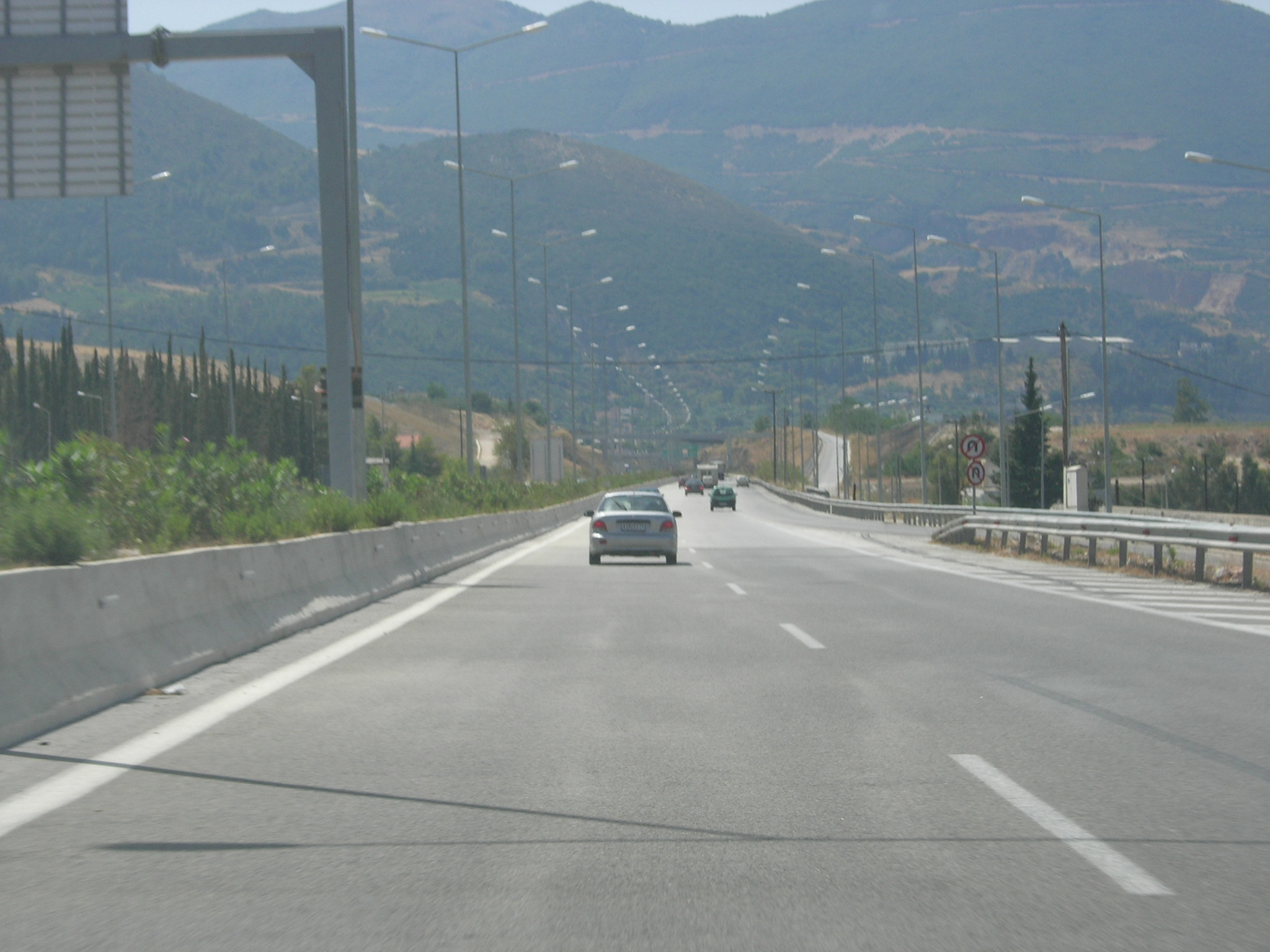
View of the Patras bypass.

The exits of the southern, Patras bypass, section of the A5 motorway:

Regional unit	Exit	Name	Destinations	Notes
Achaea		Rio interchange	to Athens	
Achaea	Patras A	Patras East interchange	Greek National Road 8a	
Achaea	Patras B	Eglykada		
Achaea	Patras C	Glafkos interchange	Port of Patras	
Achaea	Patras D	Ovrya		
Achaea		Paralia		
Achaea		Patras West	Greek National Road 9	
Achaea		Patras Industrial Area	Greek National Road 9	

== Extension ==
The A5 motorway is currently being extended northward to the border with Albania near Kakavia: the contract for the extension, which is being built as an expressway with sections of 2+1 road layout, was signed with Avax Group on 18 December 2024. The extension is being delivered in two phases: works for the first phase, from Ioannina to the junction with the EO20 and EO22 at Kalpaki, started in early-2026, and the estimated completion date is June 2029; the second phase, from Kalpaki to the border, was put out to public consultation in April 2026.

== See also ==
- Highways in Greece
