= Greek National Road 4 =

Trunk road in Greece

Coordinates: 40.4846°N 22.1821°E

National Road 4
- Εθνική Οδός 4
- Route of the EO4 and Drepano–Petrana national roads, in blue

Route information
- Length: 85.4 km (53.1 mi)
- Existed: 9 July 1963–present

Major junctions
- East end: Alexandreia
- West end: Kozani

Location
- Country: Greece
- Regions: Central Macedonia; Western Macedonia
- Primary destinations: Alexandreia; Veria; Kastanea; Polymylos; Kozani

Highway system
- Highways in Greece; Motorways; National roads
← EO3	→ EO5

National Road 4 (Greek: Εθνική Οδός 4), abbreviated as the EO4, is a national road in northern Greece. It connects Kozani with Chalkidona, passing through Veria.

== Route ==
The EO4 is officially defined as an east–west link road between the EO1 at Alexandreia to the east, and the EO3 at Kozani to the west, via Veria, Kastania and Polymylos. The A2 motorway (Egnatia Odos), which carries European route E90, runs parallel to the EO4 for its entire length.

A section of the EO4, between Drepano and Nea Charavgi, is part of the E65: there are plans to reroute the E65 away from this segment after the A3 motorway is connected to the A2, but this would require amending Annex I of the European Agreement on Main International Traffic Arteries (AGR) to reroute the E65 away from Larissa and Domokos (as currently defined).

== History ==
Ministerial Decision G25871 of 9 July 1963 created the EO4 from part of the old EO30 from Alexandreia to Kozani, which existed by royal decree from 1955 to 1963. Until 1975, the EO4 formed part of the old European route E92.

== Drepano–Petrana National Road ==
The Drepano–Petrana National Road (Greek: Εθνική Οδός Δρεπάνου - Πετρανών) is an unnumbered, single carriageway branch of the EO4 in Kozani, running from Drepano in the north to Petrana and the EO3 in the south: the branch is about 3.97 kilometres (2.47 miles) long, and acts as the eastern bypass around the city. The Drepano–Petrana National Road was defined by the National Statistical Service of Greece (ESYE) in 1998, numbering it the EO4β for statistical purposes, and is also part of European route E65.
