= European route E951 =

Road in trans-European E-road network

E951

Route information
- Length: 193 km (120 mi)

Major junctions
- North end: Pedini
- South end: Missolonghi

Location
- Countries: Greece

Highway system
- International E-road network; A Class; B Class

European route E951, formerly the E957 from 1983 to 1986, is a Class B European route that runs through the Greek regions of Epirus and Western Greece, from Pedini (near Ioannina) through Agrinio to Missolonghi. Introduced in 1983, the E951 is part of the International E-road network, a network of main roads in Europe: however, it does not follow the A5 motorway for its entire length, because the latter bypasses Agrinio by a significant distance.

== History ==
The E951 was introduced with the current E-road network, which was finalised on 15 November 1975 and implemented on 15 March 1983: it was originally known as the E957, and replaced part of the E19 from the old E-road network, which existed from 1950 to 1983. On 12 September 1986, the E957 adopted its current number.

Before the arrival of the A2 motorway (Egnatia Odos) in Ioannina, the northern end of the E951 used to be at the western shore of Lake Pamvotida, where the E90 and E92 used to follow the EO6: after the A2 opened, the northern end was shortened to Bafra, south of the city. On 3 August 2017, the northern end of the E951 was moved again to Pedini, following the opening of the A5 motorway from Perdika to the A2.

== Route ==
Since 2017, the E951 runs from Pedini (near Ioannina) in the north to Missolonghi in the south, via Arta and Agrinio. the E951 south of Kouvaras is not a motorway, because the A5 motorway bypasses Agrinio by a significant distance.

In relation to the national road network, the E951 currently follows (in order, from north to south):

- The A5 motorway, from Pedini to Kouvaras
- The EO5 road, from Kouvaras to Missolonghi

The E951 runs concurrently with the E55 and E952 on part of the A5 segment between Lake Amvrakia and Kouvaras, and the E952 on part of the EO5 segment between Kouvaras and Agrinio. The E951 also connects with the E90 and E92 at Pedini. If the A5 is extended from Pedini to Kakavia, the E951 will also connect with the E853 at Pedini.

== See also ==
- International E-road network in Greece
