= Mavrovouni =

Mavrovouni (Greek: Μαυροβούνι, Greek pronunciation: [mavɾo'vuni]), meaning black mountain, may refer to several places in Greece:

- Mavrovouni, Ioannina, a village in the Ioannina regional unit, part of the municipal unit Kalpaki
- Mavrovouni, Laconia, a village in Laconia, part of the municipal unit Gytheio
- Mavrovouni, Larissa, a village in the Larissa regional unit, part of the municipal unit Krannonas
- Mavrovouni, Pella, a village in the Pella regional unit, part of the municipality Skydra
- Mavrovouni Mountain, a mountain in Thessaly
- Mavrovouni Ymittou, a peak of the Hymettus mountain in Attica.
