= A52 motorway (Greece) =

Road in Greece

A52 motorway
- Αυτοκινητόδρομος Α52
- Amvrakia Odos
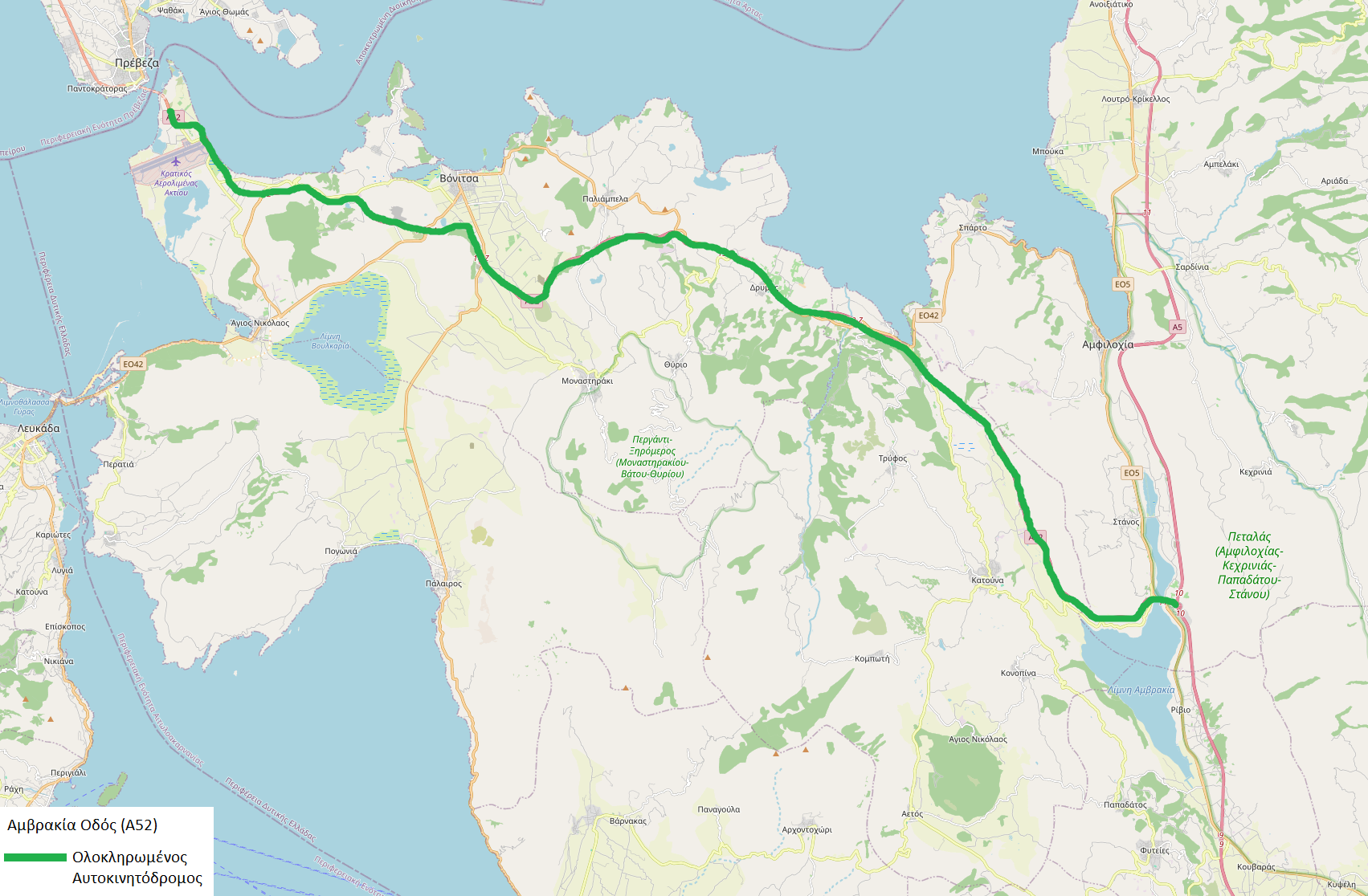

Route information
- Part of E55 and E952
- Length: 48 km (30 mi)

Major junctions
- West end: Actium
- East end: Lake Amvrakia (A5)

Location
- Country: Greece
- Regions: Western Greece
- Primary destinations: Actium; Vonitsa; Lake Amvrakia

Highway system
- Highways in Greece; Motorways; National roads
← A5	→ A6

The A52 motorway, also known as the Amvrakia Odos (Greek: Αμβρακία Οδός), is a branch of the A5 Ionia Odos motorway in Aetolia-Acarnania, Greece. The A52 is an important motorway for the tourist region of the Ambracian Gulf. Its construction should have been finished until 2012, however the crisis in the country delayed its completion. The Motorway connects the Airport of Aktio the Island of Lefkada and the A5 motorway. The construction started In July 2009. It will be 48,5 km long and it will have 4 lanes (2+2) with hard shoulder and median, but without emergency lane. As of 2022, the two separate sections (Vonitsa - Aktio with a length of 15 km and Ionia Odos motorway - Loutraki with a length of 17 km) are operational, having been opened to traffic in 2019 and 2022 respectively. The other two sections were finished in January 2024.

== Route ==
The A52 motorway is located entirely within the Aetolia-Acarnania regional unit: it is mostly in the municipality of Aktio-Vonitsa, with a small eastern part in the municipality of Amfilochia.

=== Exit list ===
Municipality	km	mi	Exit	Name	Destinations	Notes
Aktio-Vonitsa	0.72	0.45	—	—	Actium EO / E55 – Igoumenitsa, Preveza Local Roads	Roundabout; western end of E952
Aktio-Vonitsa	3.46	2.15	—	—	—	Entry only
Aktio-Vonitsa	4.87	3.03	1	—	EO – Agios Nikolaos, Actium	
Aktio-Vonitsa	11.5	7.1	2	—	EO42 – Lefkada, Vonitsa–West	
Aktio-Vonitsa	14.39	8.94	3	—	Mytikas, Vonitsa–East	
Aktio-Vonitsa	20.70	12.86	3Α	Paliampela	Monastiraki, Paliampela	Westbound exit only
Aktio-Vonitsa	25.70	15.97	4	Thyrreio	EO42 – Monastiraki, Paliampela	
Aktio-Vonitsa	27.56	17.12	5	Drymos	EO42 – Drymos	Westbound exit only
Aktio-Vonitsa	31.36	19.49	6	Loutraki	EO42 – Amfilochia, Drymos	
Amfilochia	48.35	30.04	7	Katouna	Katouna	Eastbound exit only
Amfilochia	48.91	30.39	Western limit of the Nea Odos concession			
Amfilochia	49.02	30.46	8	—	EO5 – Rivio	
Amfilochia	49.34	30.66	10	Preveza	A5 / E951 – Ioannina, Amfilochia A5 / E55 / E951 / E952 – Patras, Agrinio	
1.000 mi = 1.609 km; 1.000 km = 0.621 mi: Incomplete access; Route transition
