= SH 4 (Albania) =

National highway in Albania

National Road SH4
- Rruga shtetërore SH4
- Map of the Rruga Shtetërore 4 (SH4) mainline denoted in blue in Albania

Route information
- Part of E853
- Maintained by the Autoriteti Rrugor Shqiptar
- Length: 223.29 km (138.75 mi)

Major junctions
- North end: SH2 in Durrës

- South end: SH72 in Kakavija

Location
- Country: Albania
- Counties: Durrës, Fier, Gjirokastër, Tirana
- Major cities: Durrës, Fier Gjirokastër, Kavajë, Libohovë, Lushnjë, Rrogozhinë, Tepelenë

Highway system
- Highways in Albania

The SH4 highway (Albanian: Rruga Shtetërore 4) is a national highway in Albania spanning 223.29 kilometres (138.75 miles) across the counties of Durrës, Fier, Gjirokastër and Tirana. As it connects the country's second largest city Durrës to Greece, the highway represents a significant north–south transportation corridor in Albania and an essential part of the Adriatic–Ionian motorway and Pan-European Corridor VIII.

== Description ==
The Rruga Shtetërore 4 (SH4) constitutes the southern section of the north–south transportation corridor in Albania. It connects the country's second largest city of Durrës on the Adriatic Sea to the country of Greece at the Kakavijë border crossing. Part of the road network of Albania, the highway is a portion of the European route E853 Kakavijë–Ioannina, and the Pan-European Corridor VIII Durrës–Skopje–Sofia–Varna. Combined with the Rruga Shtetërore 1 (SH1), the northern section of the north–south corridor, the highway will form a major segment of the proposed Adriatic–Ionian motorway.

=== Route ===
The Rruga Shtetërore 4 (SH4) consists of two traffic lanes and an emergency lane in each driving direction separated by a central reservation along most of its length. There are a number of rest areas along the highway providing various types of services, ranging from simple parking spaces to filling stations. The highway spans 223.29 kilometres (138.75 miles) between the city of Durrës in Durrës County across Rrogozhinë in Tirana County, Fier in Fier County, Tepelenë in Gjirokastër County and the Kakavia border crossing to Greece, where it connects with the EO22 road.

== See also ==
- International E-road network
- Transport in Albania
- A2 (Albania)
