= Greek National Road 26 =

Trunk road in Greece

National Road 26
- Εθνική Οδός 26
- Route of the EO26 road, in blue

Route information
- Length: 68.5 km (42.6 mi)
- Existed: 9 July 1963–present

Major junctions
- East end: Elassona
- West end: Agiofyllo

Location
- Country: Greece
- Regions: Thessaly; Western Macedonia
- Primary destinations: Elassona; Deskati; Agiofyllo

Highway system
- Highways in Greece; Motorways; National roads
| ← EO25 | → EO27 |

National Road 26 (Greek: Εθνική Οδός 26), abbreviated as the EO26, is a national road in the Thessaly and Western Macedonia regions of Greece. The EO26 runs between Elassona and Agiofyllo.

== Route ==
The EO26 is officially defined as an east–west road located in the Grevena, Larissa and Trikala regional units. The road runs from Elassona (Larissa) and the EO3 in the east, to Agiofyllo (Trikala) and the EO15 in the west, via Deskati (Grevena). Since 23 July 2026, the A3 motorway is accessible via the EO15, from the western end of the EO26.

== History ==
Ministerial Decision G25871 of 9 July 1963 created the EO26 from the old EO81, which existed by royal decree from 1955 until 1963, and followed the same route as the current EO26.
