= Geroplatanos, Ioannina =

Geroplatanos
- Community
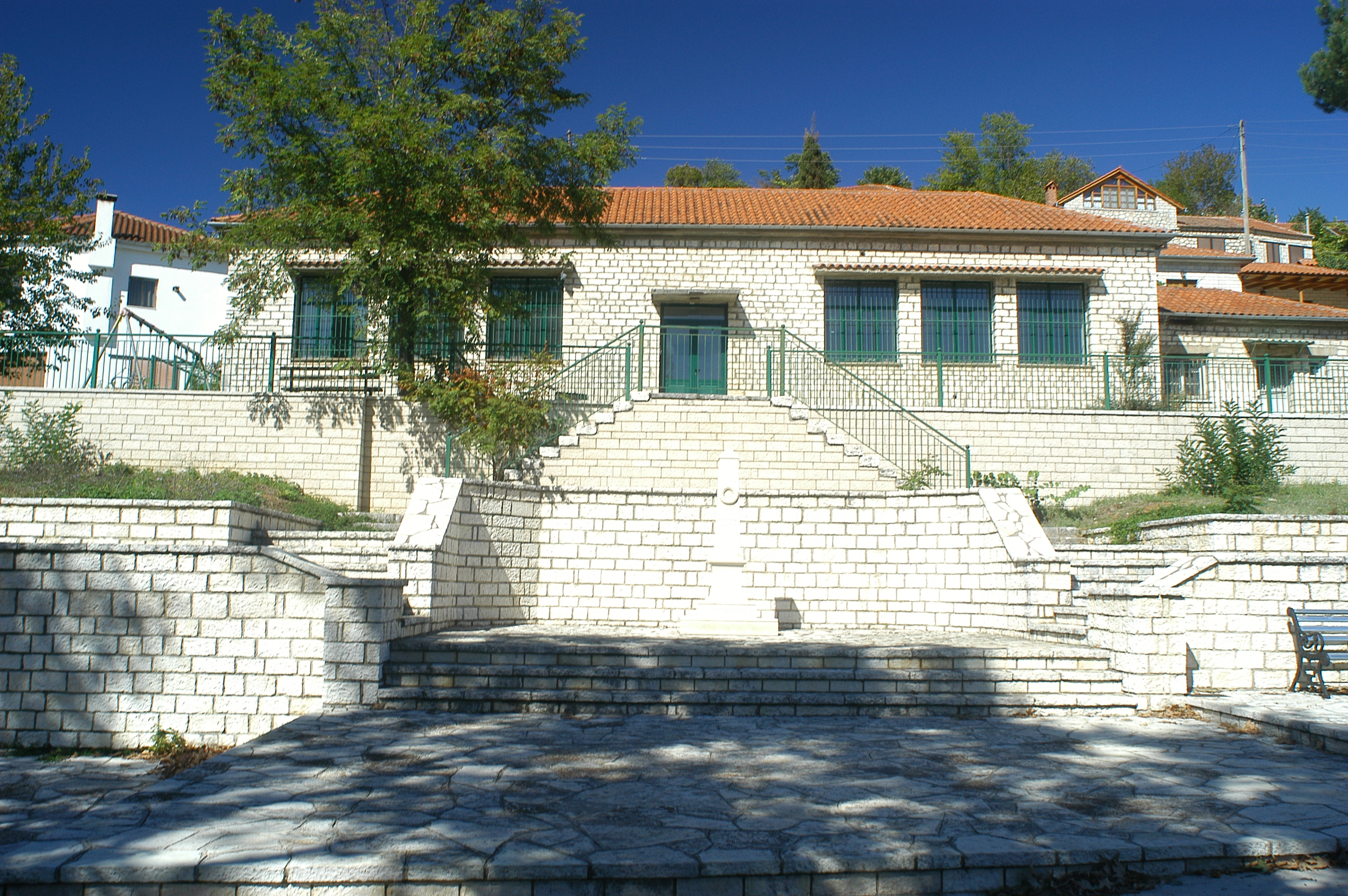

- Location within Greece
- Coordinates: 39°58′14″N 20°37′32″E
- Country: Greece
- Administrative region: Epirus
- Regional unit: Ioannina
- Municipality: Pogoni
- Municipal unit: Kalpaki
- Elevation: 764 m (2,507 ft)

Population (2021)
  - Community: 106
- Time zone: UTC+2 (EET)
  - Summer (DST): UTC+3 (EEST)

Geroplatanos (Greek: Γεροπλάτανος, before 1927: Αληζώτ Τσιφλίκ, Alizot Tsiflik) is a settlement in Ioannina regional unit, Epirus, Greece. Traditionally, the village was part of the Zagori region until the construction of the Ioannina–Konitsa road.

== Name ==
The toponym is derived from the personal name Alizot and the Turkish loanword in Albanian çiflik, -u, stemming from the Turkish çift-lik meaning 'estate'. Alizot is a compound formation and stems from the Turkish personal name Ali (the adopted son of Muhammad and fourth caliph) and the Albanian noun zot, -i meaning 'lord, master, God'. The Turkish name Ali within the compound personal name Alizot passed through Islam to Albanian populations, as indicated by its composition with the second part of the compound, the Albanian word zot, -i.

== History ==
In 1706, Alizot Pasha violently seized fertile lands from the village of Mavrovouni and forcefully gathered inhabitants from surrounding areas to populate the newly established settlement of Alizot Tsiflik at the foot of the mountain. In the 19th century, the village was owned as a private estate.

== Demographics ==
The village is inhabited by Greeks.

== See also ==
- List of settlements in the Ioannina regional unit
