= Klokova Tunnel =

Road tunnel in Greece

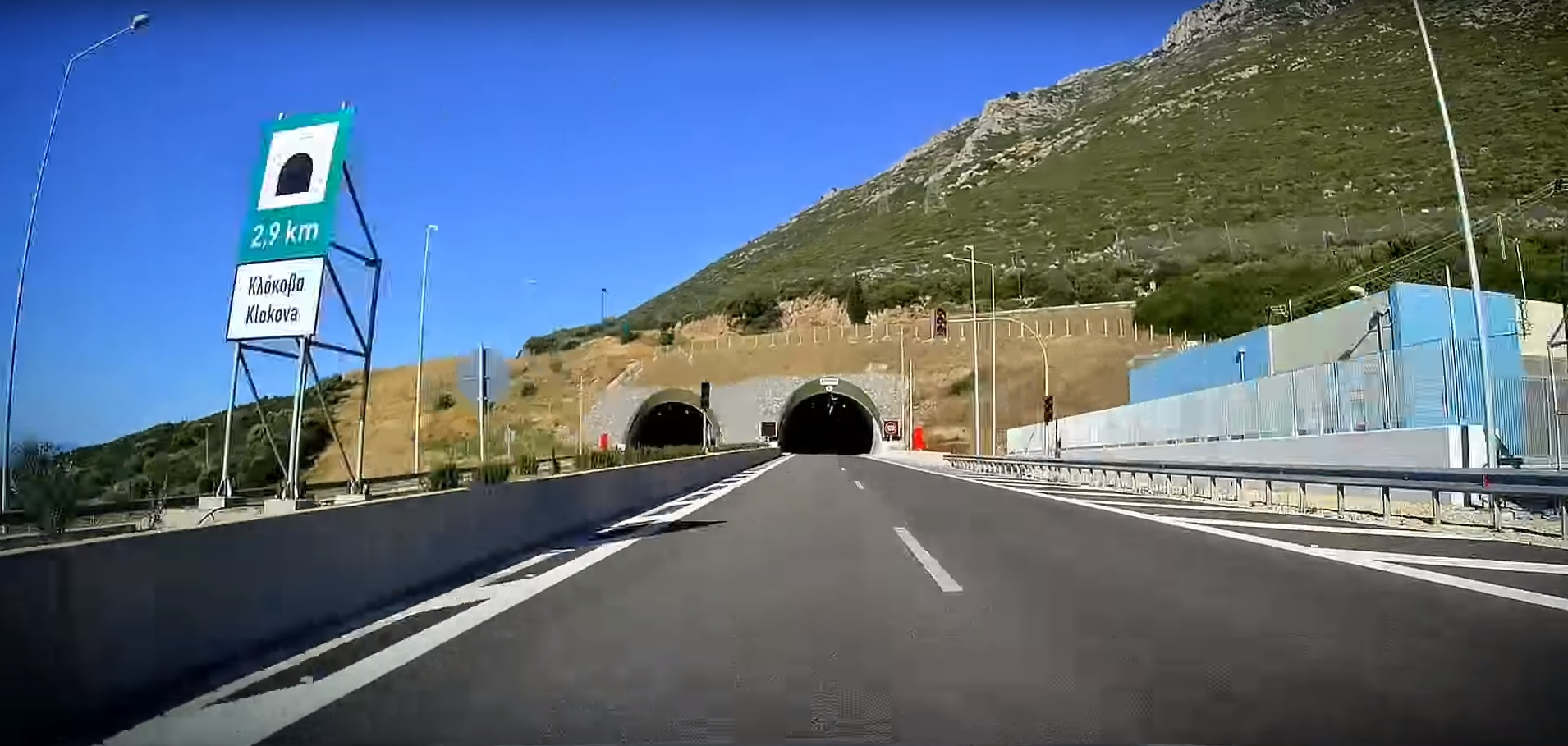
- Entrance to the Klokova tunnel
- Interactive map of Klokova Tunnel

Overview
- Location: Aetolia-Acarnania, Greece
- Coordinates: 38°21′13.2″N 21°40′47.1″E
- Status: Completed
- Route: A5 motorway

Operation
- Work began: March 2015
- Opened: April 2017
- Owner: Hellenic Government
- Operator: Nea Odos S.A.
- Traffic: automotive
- Character: Twin-tube motorway tunnel

Technical
- Length: 2,800 m (9,200 ft)
- No. of lanes: 2x2

The Klokova Tunnel (Greek: Σήραγγα Κλόκοβας) is a tunnel on the A5 motorway (Ionia Odos), western Greece. It is built in order for the new motorway to bypass the Klokova mountain, which, until recently, was traversed by the narrow Greek National Road 5. Works began in March 2015 and were completed with the opening of the tunnel on 12 April 2017.
