= Greek National Road 22 =

Trunk road in Greece

Coordinates: 39.9032°N 20.5141°E

National Road 22
- Εθνική Οδός 22
- Route of the EO22 road, in blue

Route information
- Part of E853
- Length: 24.8 km (15.4 mi)
- Existed: 9 July 1963–present

Major junctions
- East end: Kalpaki
- West end: Border with Albania (Kakavia)

Location
- Country: Greece
- Regions: Epirus
- Primary destinations: Kalpaki; Border with Albania (Kakavia)

Highway system
- Highways in Greece; Motorways; National roads
← EO21	→ EO24

Greek National Road 22 (Greek: Εθνική Οδός 22), abbreviated as EO22, is a major national road in northwestern Greece. The EO22 runs within the Ioannina regional unit, from Kalpaki to the border crossing with Albania near Kakavijë, and is part of European route E853.

== Route ==
The EO22 is officially defined as an east–west road within the Ioannina regional unit: it branches off the EO20 at Kalpaki, and heads west to the border crossing with Albania near Kakavijë, connecting with the Albanian SH 4 road. The entire road is part of European route E853, which runs from the Albanian–Greek border to Ioannina, the capital of both the regional unit and Epirus.

On 15 December 1995, the EO22 became part of the basic (primary) national road network.

== History ==
Ministerial Decision G25871 of 9 July 1963 created the EO22 from the old EO29, which existed by royal decree from 1955 until 1963, and followed the same route as the current EO22.

From 1950 to 1962, the road was part of the old E19. The EO22 became part of the International E-road network on 15 March 1983, originally as part of the E851 until 12 September 1986, and then as part of the E853 thereafter.

== Planned changes ==
If the A5 motorway is extended from Pedini to Kakavia, the E853 will be rerouted away from the EO22: the section affecting the EO22 was put out to public consultation in April 2026.
