= Bizani =

Bizani Μπιζάνι
- Municipal unit
- Location within the regional unit

- Location within Greece
- Coordinates: 39°34′N 20°52′E
- Country: Greece
- Administrative region: Epirus
- Regional unit: Ioannina
- Municipality: Ioannina

Area
  - Municipal unit: 91.372 km^{2} (35.279 sq mi)
  - Community: 11.660 km^{2} (4.502 sq mi)
- Elevation: 575 m (1,886 ft)

Population (2021)
  - Municipal unit: 4,387
  - Municipal unit density: 48.01/km^{2} (124.4/sq mi)
  - Community: 380
  - Community density: 33/km^{2} (84/sq mi)
- Time zone: UTC+2 (EET)
  - Summer (DST): UTC+3 (EEST)
- Vehicle registration: ΙΝ

Bizani (Greek: Μπιζάνι) is a village and a former municipality in the Ioannina regional unit, Epirus, Greece. Since the 2011 local government reform it is part of the municipality Ioannina, of which it is a municipal unit. The municipal unit has an area of 91.372 km^{2}, the community 11.660 km^{2}. In 2021 its population was 4,387. The seat of the municipality was in Pedini. The municipal unit is situated in the plains and low hills south and southwest of Ioannina. The Greek National Road 5 (Ioannina - Arta), the Greek National Road 17 (Ioannina - Dodoni) and the A2 Egnatia Odos motorway (Igoumenitsa - Ioannina - Thessaloniki) pass through the municipal unit.

== Subdivisions ==
The municipalunit Bizani is subdivided into the following communities (constituent villages in brackets):

- Ampeleia (Ampeleia, Filothei)
- Bizani (Neo Bizani, Koloniati)
- Asvestochori
- Kontsika (Kontsika, Synoikismos Kontsikas)
- Kosmira
- Manoliasa
- Pedini (Pedini, Fteri, Chioniasa)

== Population ==
Historical population
| Year | Pop. | ±% |
|---|---|---|
| 1991 | 3,052 | — |
| 2001 | 3,948 | +29.4% |
| 2011 | 5,124 | +29.8% |
| 2021 | 4,387 | −14.4% |

== History ==
The village and former municipality, gets its name from the nearby fort built by the Ottoman Empire which in turn may have been inspired by the nearby mountain range. Fort Bezhani, as referenced by some groups like the US Congress Committee on Military Affairs, is known in Greek as "Bizani" (also Fort Bijan) was the location of the Battle of Bizani that took place in February 1913 as part of the Balkan Wars as the last stronghold for Ioannina and the remainder of Epirus before ending almost five centuries of Ottoman Turkish rule.

== See also ==
- List of settlements in the Ioannina regional unit
