= Katara Pass =

Mountain pass in Greece

Coordinates: 39.7948°N 21.2293°E

The Katara Pass or Metsovo Pass (Greek: Πέρασμα της Κατάρας) is a mountain pass in the Pindus mountains in northern Greece. It is 5 km (3 mi) northeast of the town Metsovo. Situated on the border of Epirus (Ioannina regional unit) and Thessaly (Trikala regional unit), it forms the divide between the river basins of the Aoos to the southwest and the Pineios to the east. Its elevation is about 1,705 m (5,595 ft) making it one of the highest in the nation. Greek National Road 6 (Larissa - Trikala - Metsovo - Ioannina - Igoumenitsa) crosses the Katara Pass. With the opening of the A2 motorway (Egnatia Odos), which passes through tunnels further south, traffic has sharply declined.
