= Greek National Road 25 =

Trunk road in Greece

National Road 25
- Εθνική Οδός 25
- Route of the EO25 road, in blue

Route information
- Length: 17.2 km (10.7 mi)
- Existed: 9 July 1963–present

Major junctions
- North end: Corfu
- South end: Achilleion (loop)

Location
- Country: Greece
- Regions: Ionian Islands
- Primary destinations: Corfu; Achilleion (loop)

Highway system
- Highways in Greece; Motorways; National roads
← EO24	→ EO26

Greek National Road 25 (Greek: Εθνική Οδός 25), abbreviated as the EO25, is one of two national roads in the island of Corfu, Greece. The EO25 runs between the city of Corfu and Achilleion, and is one of five national roads that serve the Ionian Islands.

== Route ==
The EO25 is officially defined as a north–south road in the central part of the island of Corfu, with a loop at the southern end. The northern end is in the city of Corfu, where the road connects with the EO24: the southern end is a loop that passes (clockwise) through the villages of Chrysiida, Perama, Gastouri and Achilleion palace, and Souleika. The EO25 is also the closest national road to Corfu International Airport.

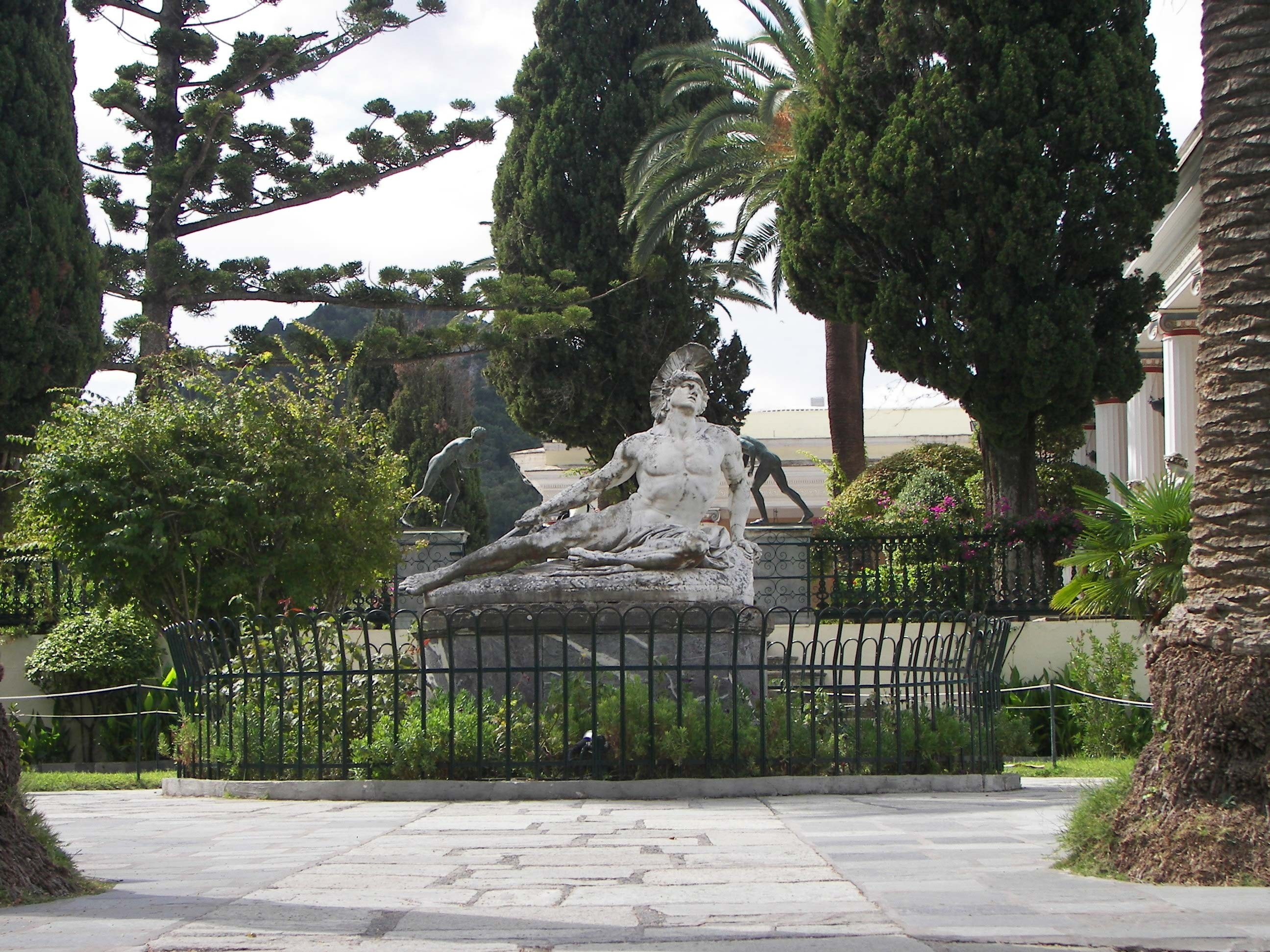
The garden of Achilleion palace, near the southern loop of the EO25

== History ==
Ministerial Decision G25871 of 9 July 1963 created the EO25 from part of the old EO73 between the city of Corfu and Achilleion, which existed by royal decree from 1955 until 1963: the remainder became part of the EO24.
