= Greek National Road 24 =

Trunk road in Greece

National Road 24
- Εθνική Οδός 24
- Route of the EO24 road, in blue

Route information
- Length: 23.5 km (14.6 mi)
- Existed: 9 July 1963–present

Major junctions
- East end: Corfu
- West end: Palaiokastritsa

Location
- Country: Greece
- Regions: Ionian Islands
- Primary destinations: Corfu; Palaiokastritsa

Highway system
- Highways in Greece; Motorways; National roads
← EO22	→ EO25

Greek National Road 24 (Greek: Εθνική Οδός 24), abbreviated as the EO24, is one of two national roads in the island of Corfu, Greece. The EO24 runs between the city of Corfu and Palaiokastritsa, and is one of five national roads that serve the Ionian Islands.

== Route ==
The EO24 is officially defined as an east–west road, crossing the northern part of the island of Corfu: it is about 23.5 kilometres (14.6 miles) long, and runs from the city of Corfu in the east to Palaiokastritsa in the west. The EO24 meets with the EO25 at Corfu.

Places of interest along the EO24 include Palaiokastritsa monastery, the beach of Paleokastritsa, and the Byzantine fortress of Angelokastro.

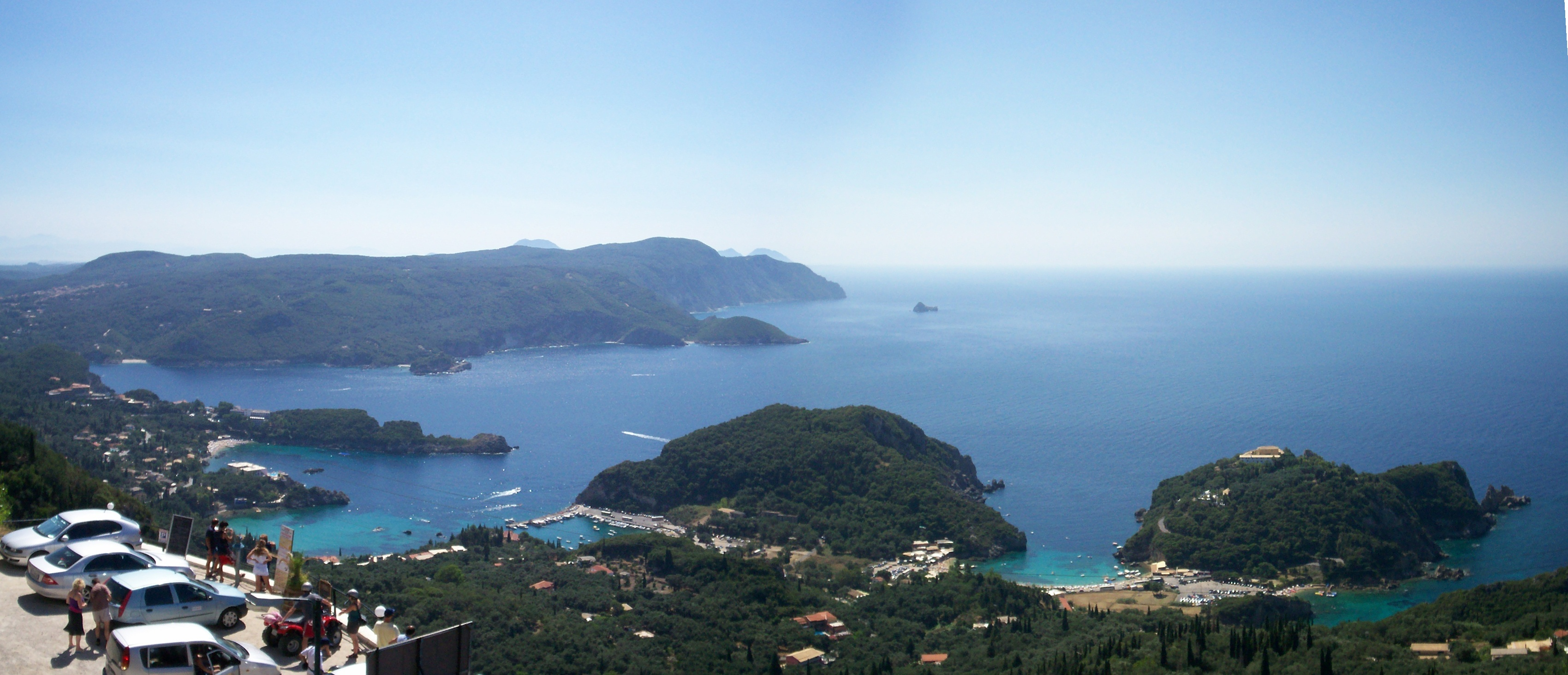
The beach of Palaiokastritsa, at the western end of the EO24

== History ==
Ministerial Decision G25871 of 9 July 1963 created the EO24 from part of the old EO73 between the city of Corfu and Palaiokastritsa, which existed by royal decree from 1955 until 1963: the remainder became part of the EO25.
