= European route E962 =

Road in trans-European E-road network

E962

Route information
- Length: 51 km (32 mi)

Major junctions
- South end: Elefsina
- North end: Thebes

Location
- Countries: Greece

Highway system
- International E-road network; A Class; B Class

European route E962 is a Class B European route in the Greek regional units of Boeotia and West Attica, running from Elefsina to Thebes. Introduced in 1986, it is part of the International E-road network, a network of main roads in Europe.

== History ==
The national road between Elefsina and Thebes used to be part of the original E-road network from 16 September 1950 to 23 July 1963, when the EO1 ran via Elefsina instead of Sfendali, and the old E92 followed the EO1 from Athens to Chalkidona: the national road became part of the current E-road network on 12 September 1986, with the introduction of the E962.

== Route ==
According to the 2016 revision of the European Agreement on Main International Traffic Arteries (AGR), the E962 currently runs from Elefsina in the south to Thebes in the north. In relation to the national road network, the E962 currently follows the EO3 road for nearly the entire length: the E962 connects with the E94 in the south, and the E75 in the north.

== See also ==
- International E-road network in Greece
