= Mavrovouni, Ioannina =

Mavrovouni
- Community
- Location within Greece
- Coordinates: 39°57′4″N 20°36′56″E
- Country: Greece
- Administrative region: Epirus
- Regional unit: Ioannina
- Municipality: Pogoni
- Municipal unit: Kalpaki
- Elevation: 621 m (2,037 ft)

Population (2021)
  - Community: 19
- Time zone: UTC+2 (EET)
  - Summer (DST): UTC+3 (EEST)

Mavrovouni (Greek: Μαυροβούνι) is a settlement in Ioannina regional unit, Epirus, Greece. Traditionally, the village was part of the Zagori region until the construction of the Ioannina–Konitsa road.

== Name ==
The local placename Mavrovouni is a composition of the Greek adjective mavros meaning 'black' and the noun vouno 'mountain', rendered as -vouni in the toponym. Linguist Kostas Oikonomou states it should be considered a translation of the Turkish form Karadai, from the Turkish kara meaning 'black' and the noun dağ 'mountain'. The form Karadai is not recorded and preserved in oral tradition among the village's inhabitants and residents of neighboring communities.

== History ==
In 1706, some of Mavrovouni's fertile lands were forcefully confiscated by Alizot Pasha who established the village of Alizot Tsiflik (modern Geroplatanos).

== Demographics ==
The village is inhabited by Greeks.

== See also ==
- List of settlements in the Ioannina regional unit
