= Agioi Theodoroi, Kozani =

Agioi Theodoroi Άγιοι Θεόδωροι
- Settlement
- Location within Greece
- Coordinates: 40°22.4′N 22°1.4′E
- Country: Greece
- Administrative region: West Macedonia
- Regional unit: Kozani
- Municipality: Kozani
- Municipal unit: Ellispontos
- Community: Polymylos
- Elevation: 770 m (2,530 ft)

Population (2021)
  - Total: 5
- Time zone: UTC+2 (EET)
  - Summer (DST): UTC+3 (EEST)
- Postal code: 501 50
- Area code: +30-2461
- Vehicle registration: ΚΖ

Agioi Theodoroi (Greek: Άγιοι Θεόδωροι) is a village of the Kozani municipality. Before the 2011 local government reform it was part of the municipality of Ellispontos. The 2021 census recorded 5 inhabitants in the village. Agioi Theodoroi is a part of the community of Polymylos.

== See also ==
- List of settlements in the Kozani regional unit
