= European route E92 =

Road in trans-European E-road network

E92

Major junctions
- West end: Igoumenitsa
- East end: Volos

Location
- Countries: Greece

Highway system
- International E-road network; A Class; B Class

European route E92 is an intermediate Class A European route that runs through the Greek regions of Epirus and Thessaly, from Igoumenitsa to Volos.

The E92 number has been used for two routes since the current E-road network came into force in 1983: the current E92 was originally known as the E950, a Class B route that terminated at Ioannina instead of Igoumenitsa; the old E92 was a short intermediate Class A route that connected the E55 and E65 near Patras.

Both routes were introduced with the current E-road network in 1983: the old E92 was later replaced by a rerouted E65 in 1986.

== History ==
The two routes that used the E92 number were introduced with the current E-road network, which was finalised on 15 November 1975 and implemented on 15 March 1983.

The current E92 was originally known as the E950 until 1986 and replaced the E87 of the old E-road network. The E950 was a Class B route that followed the same route as the old E87, from Ioannina to Volos via Trikala and Larissa.

The old E92 replaced part of the E19 from the old network, and was a short intermediate Class A route that connected the E55 at Rio with the E65 at Aigio, using the EO8a road (now part of the A8 motorway) for its entire length: at the time, the E65 crossed the Gulf of Corinth by ferry between Aigio and Itea.

On 12 September 1986, the E950 became the E92, was upgraded to an intermediate Class A route, and extended westward to Igoumenitsa: the old E92 was replaced by a rerouted E65, which at the time used the Rio–Antirrio ferry with the E55. on 12 August 2004, both the E55 and E65 were rerouted via the Rio–Antirrio Bridge, although the ferry is still in operation for local and prohibited traffic, such as bicycles.

== Route ==
The current E92, as last revised in 1986 and acceded to by Greece on 9 January 1989, runs from Igoumenitsa in the west to Volos in the east, via Ioannina and Trikala. In relation to the national road network, the E92 currently follows (in order, from west to east):

- A2: Igoumenitsa – Ioannina – Kipoureio
- A3: Kipoureio – Trikala
- EO6: Trikala – Larissa
- EO: Larissa Southern Bypass
- EO1a: south of Larissa
- A1: Larissa – Velestino
- EO6: Velestino – Volos

The E92 runs concurrently with the E90 on the A2 segment, and the E75 on the A1 segment. The E92 also connects with the E55 at Igoumenitsa, the E853 and E951 at Ioannina, and the E65 at Larissa.

Views of the E92

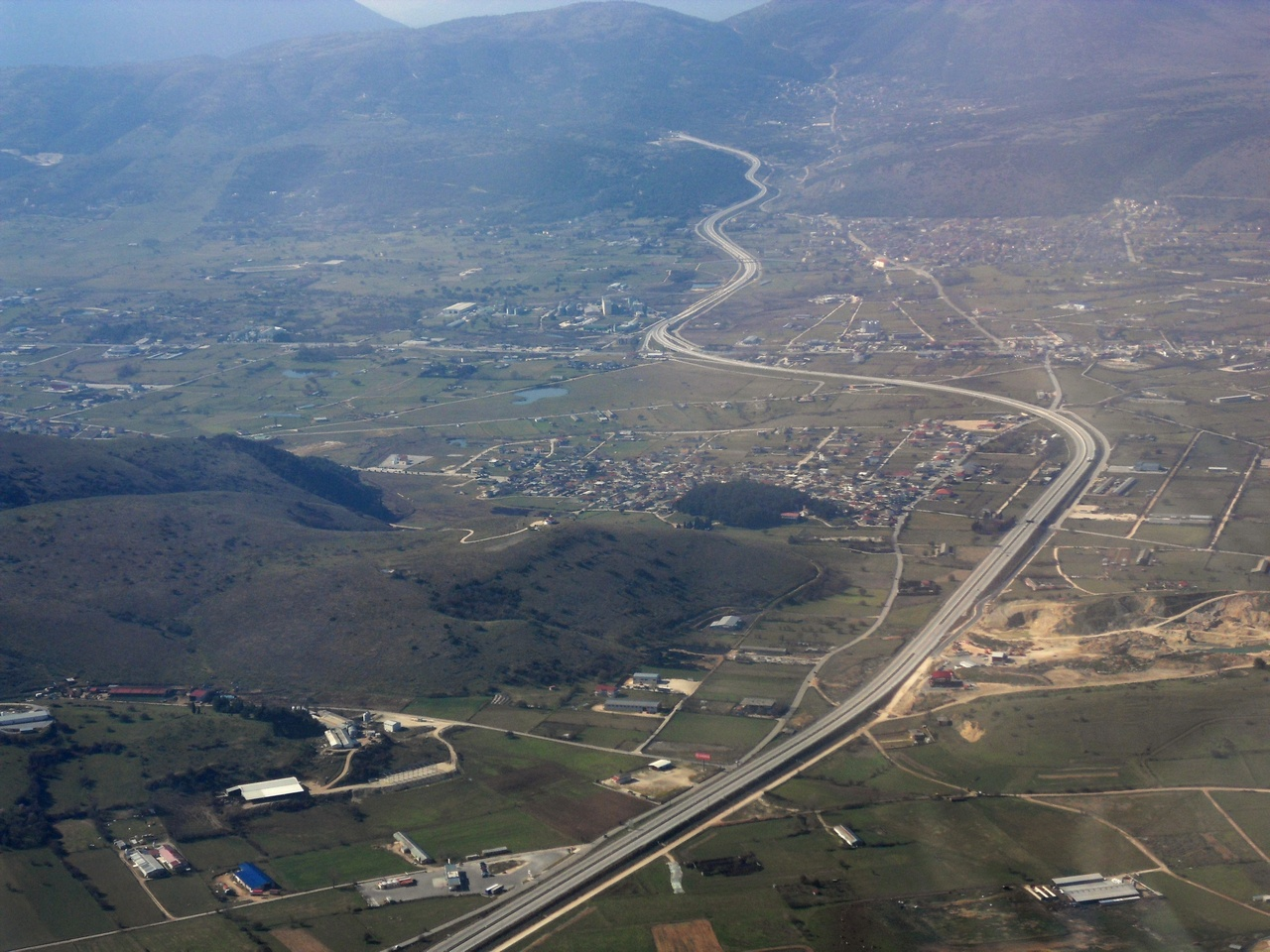
E92 in Ioannina

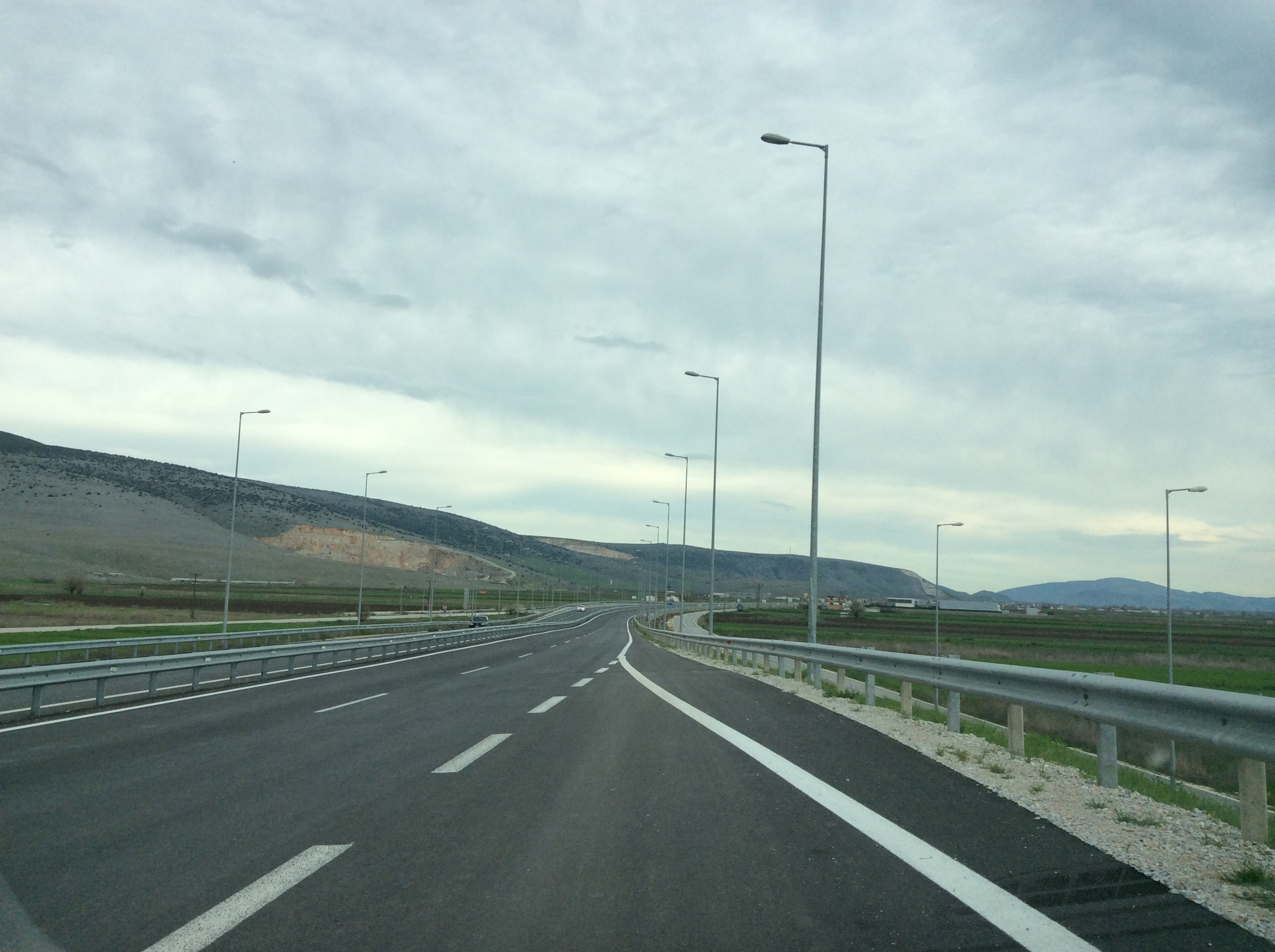
E92 in Trikala

== Planned changes ==
When the last section of the A3 motorway opens, the E92 will be rerouted via the A3 from Mourgkani to Trikala, and run concurrently with the E65 for that segment.

== See also ==
- International E-road network in Greece
