= European route E952 =

Road in trans-European E-road network

E952

Route information
- Length: 247 km (153 mi)

Major junctions
- West end: Aktio (near Preveza)
- East end: Lamia

Location
- Countries: Greece

Highway system
- International E-road network; A Class; B Class

European route E952, formerly the E951 from 1983 to 1986, is a Class B European route that runs through Western and Central Greece, from Aktio (near Preveza) through Agrinio to Lamia. Introduced in 1983, it is part of the International E-road network, a network of main roads in Europe.

== History ==
The E952 was introduced with the current E-road network, which was finalised on 15 November 1975 and implemented on 15 March 1983: it was originally known as the E951, and was then a new route that ran from Amfilochia to Lamia.

On 12 September 1986, the original E951 became the E952, and was extended to Aktio: the E951 number was then reused for the former E957. On 22 July 2022, the E952 was rerouted via Lake Amvrakia instead of Amfilochia, when a section of the A52 motorway opened between the A5 near Katouna and Loutraki, avoiding Amfilochia entirely.

== Route ==
Since 2022, the E952 runs from Aktio in the west to Lamia in the east, via Vonitsa, Lake Amvrakia and Karpenisi. In relation to the national road network, the E952 currently follows (in order, from west to east):

- The A52 motorway, from Aktio to Lake Amvrakia
- The A5 motorway, from Lake Amvrakia to Kouvaras
- The EO5 road, from Kouvaras to Agrinio
- The EO38 road, from Agrinio to Lamia

The E952 runs concurrently with the E55 from Aktio to Kouvaras, and the E951 from Lake Amvrakia to Agrinio. The E952 also connects with the E65 at Lamia.

== See also ==
- International E-road network in Greece
