= Larissa Southern Bypass =

Trunk road in Greece

Larissa Southern Bypass
- Νότια Παράκαμψη Λάρισας
- Route of the Larissa Southern Bypass, in blue

Route information
- Auxiliary route of EO3
- Part of E92
- Length: 7.53 km (4.68 mi)
- Existed: 15 December 1995–present

Location
- Country: Greece
- Regions: Thessaly

Highway system
- Highways in Greece; Motorways; National roads
← EO	→ EO

The Larissa Southern Bypass (Greek: Νότια Παράκαμψη Λάρισας) is an unnumbered national road in central Greece. Designated by ministerial decree in 1995, the road bypasses Larissa to the south, and carries European route E92.

== Route ==
The Larissa Southern Bypass is officially defined as a ring road and branch of the EO3, that bypasses Larissa to the south: Ministerial Decision DMEO/e/O/1308 of 15 December 1995 listed three named junctions on the route: Larisas, Farsalon and Georgikis Scholis (Greek: Λάρισας, Φαρσάλων, and Γεωργικής Σχολής respectively).

Numbered the EO108 for statistical purposes by the National Statistical Service of Greece (ESYE), the bypass is part of European route E92, which runs from Igoumenitsa to Volos: the Larissa Southern Bypass also connects with the EO1a at the southern end, and the EO6 at the western end.

== History ==
Ministerial Decision DMEO/e/O/1308 of 15 December 1995 made the Larissa Southern Bypass into a national road, and subclassified the road as part of the secondary network.
