= Nea Charavgi =

Village in Greece

Charavgi Χαραυγή
- Community
- Location within Greece
- Coordinates: 40°19′27″N 21°49′26″E
- Country: Greece
- Administrative region: Western Macedonia
- Regional unit: Kozani
- Municipality: Kozani
- Municipal unit: Kozani

Population (2021)
  - Community: 1,185
- Time zone: UTC+2 (EET)
  - Summer (DST): UTC+3 (EEST)

Nea Charavgi (Greek: Νέα Χαραυγή) is a village in the municipality of Kozani, northern Greece, located 5 km east of the center near the municipal park Kouri. The population of Nea Charavgi was 1,185 at the 2021 census. Together with the unpopulated old village Charavgi it forms the community Charavgi.

The public corporation of electricity moved the village to its present location in the late 1980s and mid-1990s, when the original site was found to contain deposits of lignite.

Charavgi was named Tzoumas until 1928, and Amygdala between 1928 and 1961.
