= Vatero =

Vatero Βατερό
- Community
- Location within Greece
- Coordinates: 40°17′28″N 21°44′10″E
- Country: Greece
- Administrative region: Western Macedonia
- Regional unit: Kozani
- Municipality: Kozani
- Municipal unit: Kozani

Population (2021)
  - Community: 643
- Time zone: UTC+2 (EET)
  - Summer (DST): UTC+3 (EEST)

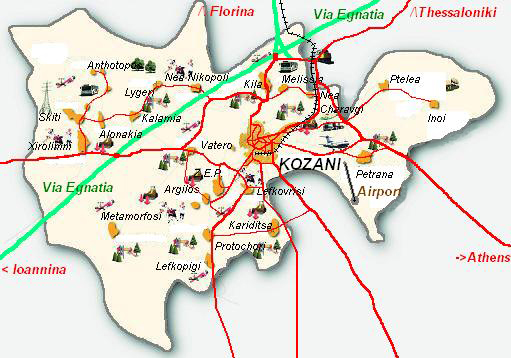
Location in Kozani

Vatero (Greek: Βατερό) is a community of the city of Kozani in northern Greece. Located west of the city centre, it has a population of 643 (2021).
