= Polymylos =

Polymylos Πολύμυλος
- Community
- Location within Greece
- Coordinates: 40°22.2′N 22°4.1′E
- Country: Greece
- Administrative region: West Macedonia
- Regional unit: Kozani
- Municipality: Kozani
- Municipal unit: Ellispontos

Area
  - Community: 57.371 km^{2} (22.151 sq mi)
- Elevation: 869 m (2,851 ft)

Population (2021)
  - Community: 353
  - Density: 6.15/km^{2} (15.9/sq mi)
- Time zone: UTC+2 (EET)
  - Summer (DST): UTC+3 (EEST)
- Postal code: 501 50
- Area code: +30-2461
- Vehicle registration: ΚΖ

Polymylos (Greek: Πολύμυλος) is a village and a community of the Kozani municipality. Before the 2011 local government reform it was part of the municipality of Ellispontos, of which it was a municipal district. The 2021 census recorded 353 inhabitants in the community of Polymylos. The community of Polymylos covers an area of 57.371 km^{2}.

== Administrative division ==
The community of Polymylos consists of five separate settlements:

- Agia Paraskevi (uninhabited)
- Agioi Theodoroi (population 5 in 2021)
- Leventis (population 3)
- Polymylos (population 342)
- Zoodochos Pigi (population 3)

== See also ==
List of settlements in the Kozani regional unit
