= A3 motorway (Greece) =

Motorway in Greece

A3 motorway
- Αυτοκινητόδρομος Α3
- Central Greece Motorway; Αυτοκινητόδρομος Κεντρικής Ελλάδας
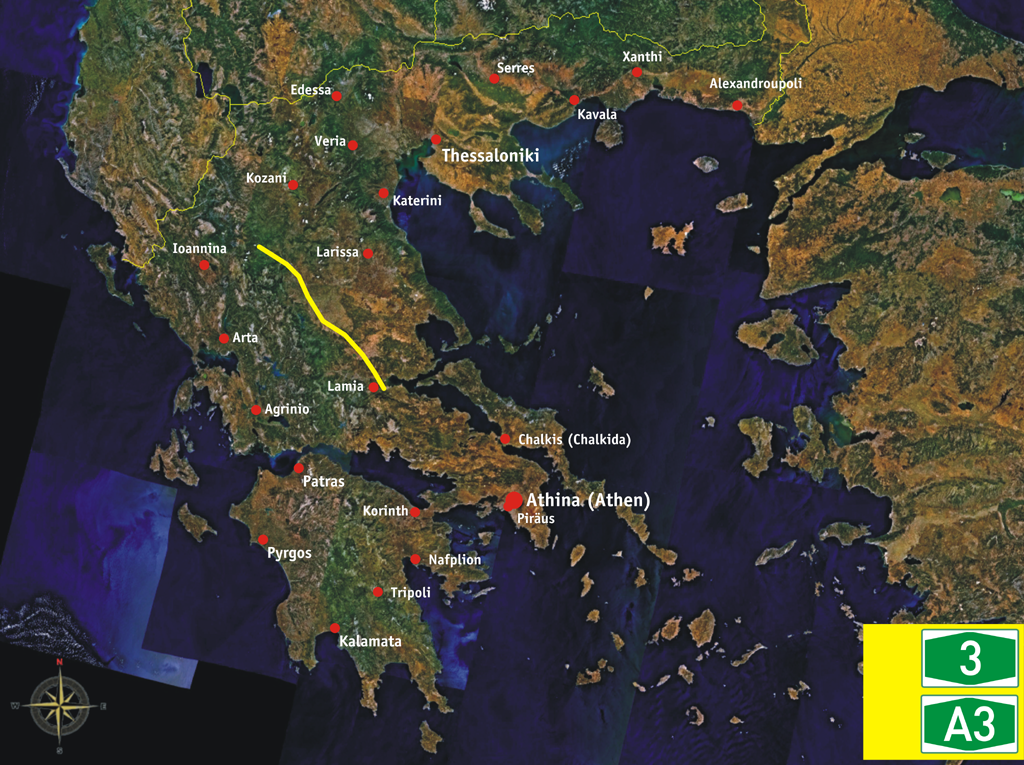

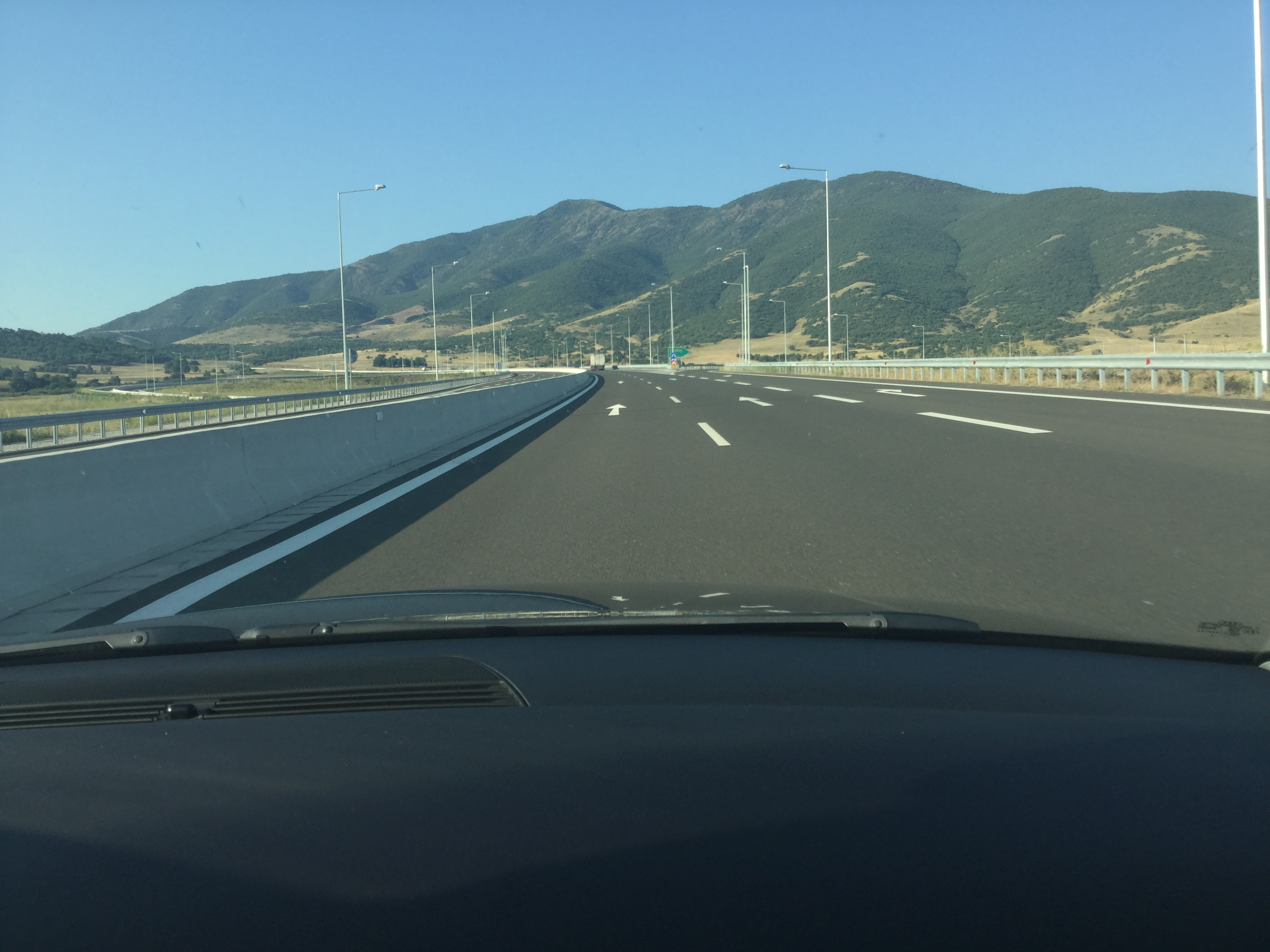
- A3 Motorway near Anavra

Route information
- Part of E65 (planned) and E92 (Trikala–Kipoureio)
- Length: 174 km (108 mi)

Major junctions
- South end: Lamia (A1)
- North end: Kipoureio (A2)

Location
- Country: Greece
- Regions: Central Greece; Thessaly
- Primary destinations: Lamia; Karditsa; Trikala; Kalabaka; Kipoureio

Highway system
- Highways in Greece; Motorways; National roads
← A29	→ A5

The A3 motorway, also known as the Central Greece motorway (Greek: Αυτοκινητόδρομος Κεντρικής Ελλάδας) or the E65 motorway, is a controlled-access highway in Greece. It links the A1 near Lamia with the A2 near Grevena, passing Karditsa, Trikala and Kalambaka. The A3 is promoted as being part of European route E65, although the European Agreement on Main International Traffic Arteries (AGR) has not yet been amended to allow the E65 to follow it.

Starting from the plain of Phthiotis near Lamia, it crosses the Othrys mountains, the plains of western Thessaly and the mountains Antichasia, Chasia and Pindos. Its total length is 174 km. The concession company is Kentriki Odos SA, which is a joint venture of ACS Group, Ferrovial and GEK Terna. Tendering began in May 2005 and ended on 31 May 2007 with the signing of the contract. The commencement of the 30 years concession period started in March 2008.

The middle section between Xyniada and Trikala was inaugurated and opened to traffic on December 22, 2017. In October 2018 the European Commission approved the funding for the construction of the southern section, Xyniada - Lamia, this section was opened to traffic in 2024. The last remaining section from Kalambaka to Grevena opened on 23 July 2026.

== History ==
The concession agreement for the construction of the project was signed in 2008 and the construction, which began in 2009, lasted 2 years and stopped in 2011 due to the Greek government-debt crisis. At the end of 2013 the concession agreement was amended and it was decided to proceed to the immediate construction of the central middle section, Trikala - Xyniada, with a length of 80 km and costing 547,000,000 euros, while construction of the northern (Grevena-Trikala) and southern (Xyniada-Lamia) section was postponed.

The middle section between Xyniada and Trikala was inaugurated and opened to traffic on December 22, 2017.

In October 2018, the European Commission approved Greek public funding of €306 million for the construction of the 32.5 km long southern section of Xyniada - Lamia, linking motorways A3 and A1. Subsequently, the concession was sent to the Greek Court of Audit, where it was unanimously approved in early December 2018, and then, on December 20, it was ratified by the Greek Parliament. The construction phase of the 32 km long southern section is currently underway and it is expected to be completed by 2022, while the 3 km long tunnel passing through the Othrys mountain has already been excavated in both sides, as of October 2021. On July 16, 2021, the 15 km section from the A1 interchange outside Lamia to the Karpenisi interchange was opened to traffic, without the Lamia interchange and the Lianokladi rest area. Those will be delivered later, along with the other 17 km of the southern section.

== E-road designation ==
Although the A3 motorway is widely promoted as being part of European route E65, officially realigning the E65 to follow the A3 requires amending Annex I of the European Agreement on Main International Traffic Arteries (AGR), as the A3 does not serve Larissa and Domokos (as currently defined by the AGR).

== Exit list ==
Regional unit	Exit	Name	Destinations	Notes/Also as
Grevena	16	Kipoureio Interchange	A2 to Thessaloniki, Grevena	Northwest terminus of the motorway
Trikala	15	Agiofyllo - Karpero	EO15 to Deskati and Grevena	
Trikala	14	Oxyneia		
Trikala	13	Grevena	EO15 to Kalabaka and Grevena	
Trikala	12	Kalabaka		
Trikala	11	Vasiliki	EO6 E92 to Kalabaka and Meteora	
Trikala	10	Trikala	EO6 E92 to Trikala and Larissa	
Trikala	9	Loggos		
Karditsa
Karditsa	8	Proastio, Agnantero		
Karditsa	7	Karditsa	EO30 to Larissa and Volos	
Karditsa	6	Sofades		
Karditsa	5	Anavra		
Karditsa	4	Smokovo		
Phthiotis
Phthiotis	3	Domokos, Xyniada	EO3 E65	
Phthiotis	2	Lamia, Lianokladi	EO38 E952	
Phthiotis	1	Lamia, Komma	EO3 E65 to Lamia	
Phthiotis	0	Lamia Interchange	A1 E75 to Athens	Southeast terminus of the motorway
