= Greek National Road 6 =

Trunk road in Greece

Coordinates: 39.7696°N 21.4609°E

National Road 6
- Εθνική Οδός 6
- Route of the EO6 road, in blue
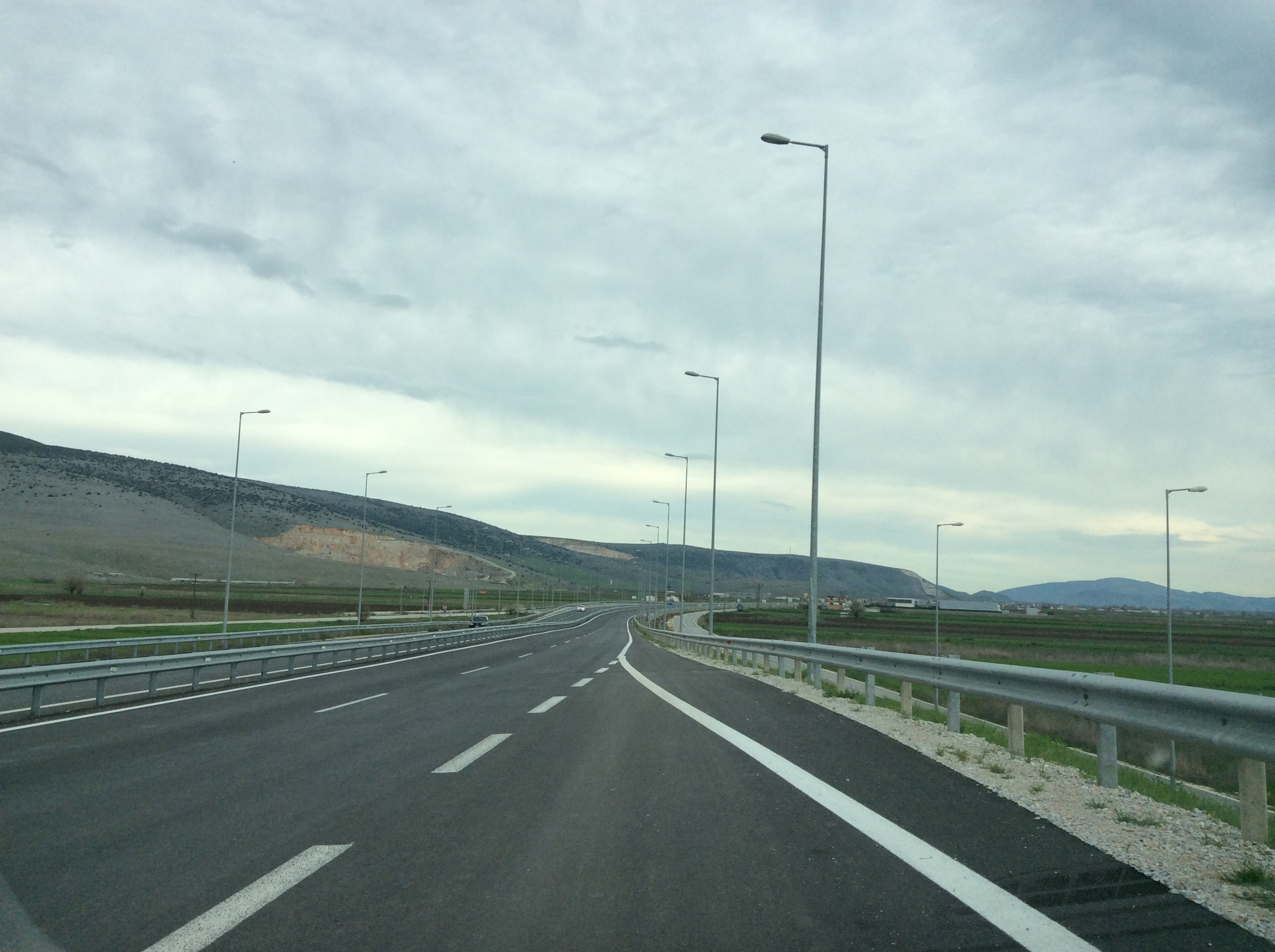
- Dual carriageway on the EO6

Route information
- Part of E92 (Volos–Velestino; Larissa–Trikala)
- Length: 355.5 km (220.9 mi)
- Existed: 9 July 1963–present

Major junctions
- East end: Volos
- West end: Igoumenitsa

Location
- Country: Greece
- Regions: Thessaly; Epirus
- Primary destinations: Volos; Larissa; Trikala; Kalabaka; Mourgani bridge; Katara; Metsovo; Ioannina; Igoumenitsa

Highway system
- Highways in Greece; Motorways; National roads
← EO5	→ EO7

Greek National Road 6 (Greek: Εθνική Οδός 6, abbreviated as EO6) is a national road in central and north western Greece. It connects the ports of Volos and Igoumenitsa, passing through the towns Ioannina, Metsovo, Trikala and Larissa. European route E92 follows the eastern part of the EO6, between Volos and Trikala. The road runs through five regional units (Thesprotia, Ioannina, Trikala, Larissa and Magnesia) and the regions of Epirus and Thessaly.

== Route ==
The EO6 is officially defined as an east–west route through central and northwestern Greece, between Volos in the east and Igoumenitsa to the west: the EO6 passes through Larissa, Trikala, Kalabaka, Mourgkani, Katara Pass, Metsovo and Ioannina. The EO6 west of Trikala is particularly mountainous, passing through the Pindus, and at Neraida, the EO6 briefly overlaps with the EO19 (formerly the EO18).

The EO6, between Larissa and the interchange with the A3 motorway near Trikala, is being upgraded to dual carriageway with expressway characteristics. Meanwhile, the A1 motorway provides a faster route than the overlapping EO1/EO6 section between Velestino and Larissa, and the A2 motorway (Egnatia Odos) does the same between Malakasi and Igoumenitsa.

Before the expansion of the Greek motorway network, which included the building of the A2 and A3, European route E92 used to follow nearly all of the EO6, except between Velestino and Larissa (where it followed the then-EO1a, most of which is now the A1): today, the E92 only follows the EO6 between Volos and Velestino and between Larissa and Trikala, where there is no motorway running parallel to it.

== Places ==
- Igoumenitsa (junction with A2)
- Parapotamos (junction with EO19)
- Ioannina (junctions with EO5, EO20)
- Metsovo (junction with A2)
- Panagia (junction with A2)
- Kalampaka (junction with EO15)
- Trikala (junction with EO30)
- Larissa (junctions with A1, EO1, EO3)
- Velestino (junction with A1)
- Volos (junctions with EO30, EO34)

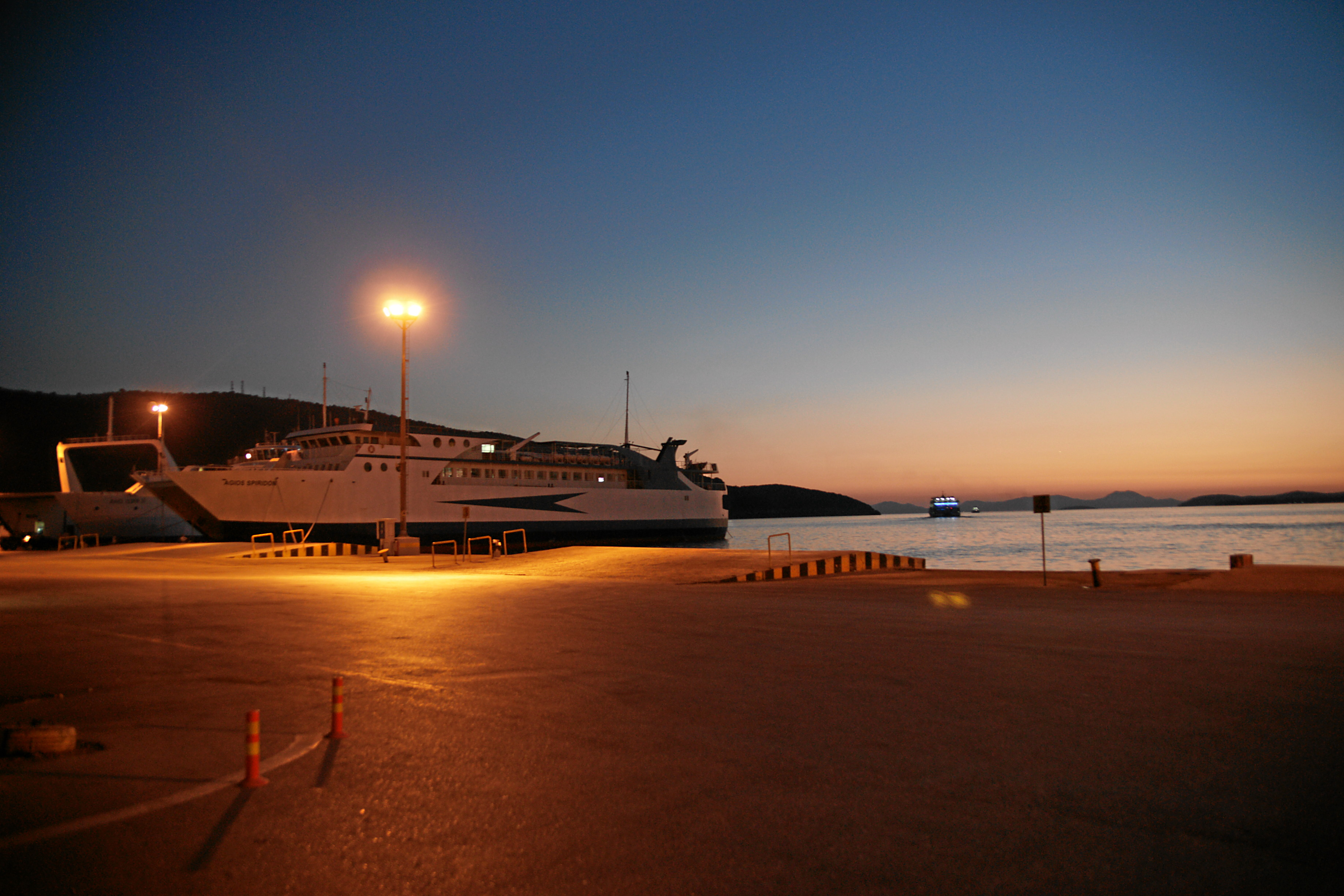
Port of Igoumenitsa, the start of the EO6

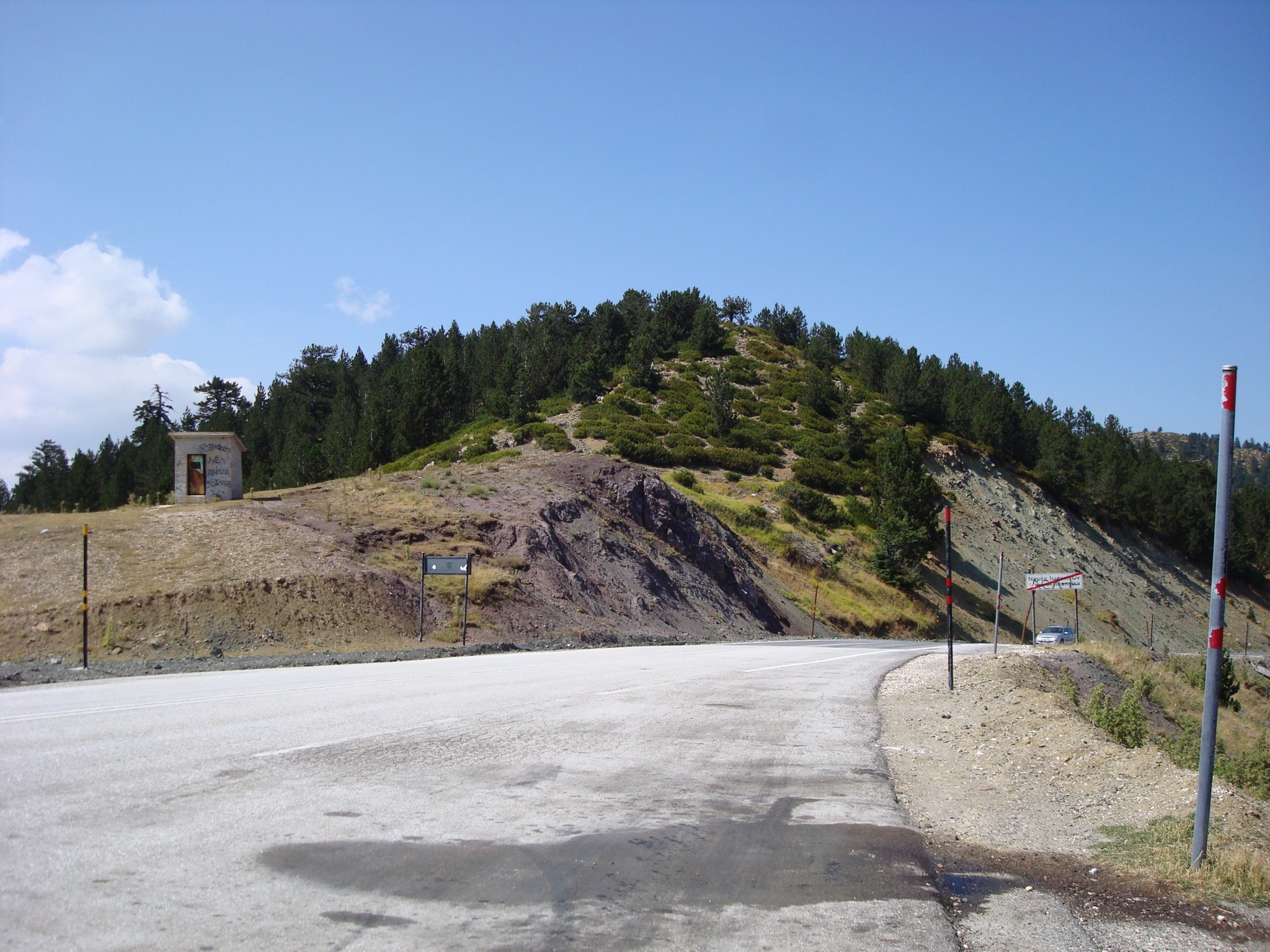
Katara Pass, the mountain pass between Ioannina and Trikala, at 1700 m. height

Regional unit	Jun./Exit	Name	Destinations	Notes
Thesprotia		Port of Igoumenitsa	A2 motorway (Greece)	
Thesprotia		Igoumenitsa		
Thesprotia		Parapotamos	Greek National Road 18	
Ioannina		Ioannina	Greek National Road 5 Greek National Road 20	
Ioannina		Metsovo	A2 motorway (Greece)	
Ioannina		Katara Pass		
Trikala		Katara Pass		
Trikala		Panagia	A2 motorway (Greece)	
Trikala		Kalabaka	Greek National Road 15	
Trikala		Trikala	Greek National Road 30	
Trikala	1	Trikala 1	Greek National Road 30	
Trikala	2	Trikala 2	A3 motorway (Greece)	
Trikala	3	Megalochori		
Trikala	4	Taxiarches		
Trikala	5	Georganades		
Trikala	6	Farkadona		
Trikala	7	Zarko		
Trikala	8	Piniada		
Trikala	9	Tirnavos, Elassona		
Larissa	10	Koutsochero		
Larissa	11	Madra		
Larissa	12	Rachoula		
Larissa		Larissa	Greek National Road 108 A1 motorway (Greece)	
Larissa		Platykampos		
Magnesia		Velestino	A1 motorway (Greece)	
Magnesia		Volos	Greek National Road 34	

== History ==
Ministerial Decision G25871 of 9 July 1963 created the current EO6 from all or part of three short-lived national roads (listed from east to west), which existed by royal decree from 1955 to 1963: the old EO14 from Volos to Larissa; the old EO23 from Larissa to Ioannina; and the old EO26 from Ioannina to Igoumenitsa. Until 1975, the EO6 formed part of the old European route E87 from Volos to Ioannina.

== See also ==
- List of Greek roads
