= Kakavia (border crossing) =

Coordinates: 39.9125°N 20.3581°E

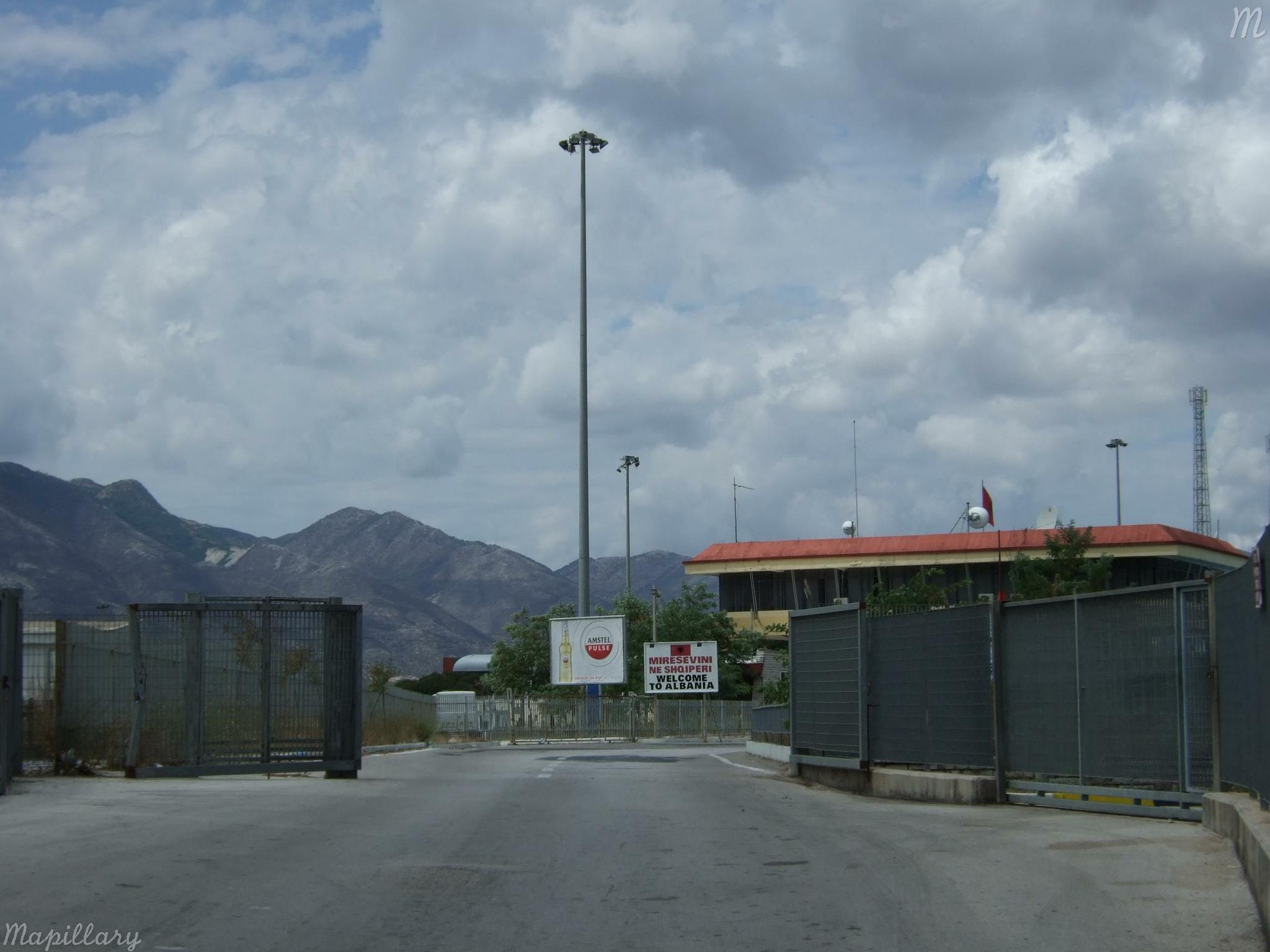
Kakavijë - Mapillary

The Kakavijë border crossing (Albanian: Pika kufitare e Kakavijës) (Greek: Κακαβιά) is a major road border crossing between southern Albania and northwestern Greece. On the Albanian side lies the village of Kakavijë, located in the Gjirokastër County, Dropull region. On the Greek side lies the village of Ktismata, in the Delvinaki municipality, Ioannina regional unit. The main road from Sarandë and Gjirokastër to Ioannina passes through this border crossing. The EO22 road, part of the European route E853, connects Kakavia with the EO20 at Kalpaki.

On August 27, 1923, the Italian general Enrico Tellini, three of his assistants, and their interpreter fell into an ambush and were assassinated by unknown assailants at Kakavijë, leading to the Corfu incident.
