= Greek National Road 5 =

Road in western Greece

Coordinates: 38.9677°N 21.1683°E

National Road 5
- Εθνική Οδός 5
- Route of the EO5 road, in blue

Route information
- Length: 232.6 km (144.5 mi)
- Existed: 9 July 1963–present

Major junctions
- South end: Rio
- North end: Ioannina

Location
- Country: Greece
- Regions: Western Greece; Epirus
- Primary destinations: Rio; Antirrio; Missolonghi; Agrinio; Amfilochia; Arta; Filippiada; Ioannina

Highway system
- Highways in Greece; Motorways; National roads
← EO4	→ EO6

National Road 5 (Greek: Εθνική Οδός 5, abbreviated as EO5) is a national road in western Greece. It connects Antirrio, at the north end of the Rio-Antirrio bridge, with Ioannina in northwestern Greece, passing through Agrinio and Arta. The southern part, between Amfilochia and Antirrio, is part of the European route E55. The northern part, between Ioannina and Amfilochia, forms the European route E951. It passes on the east side of the Ambracian Gulf. In the future much of the traffic that used this road will be diverted to the new A5 motorway (Ionia Odos) motorway, which has already taken over parts of the road. Νear Arta there is a 200m. tunnel (Kleisoura tunnel) which opened in 1969

== Route ==
The EO5 is officially defined as a north–south route through western Greece, running between Rio to the south and Ioannina to the north, via Antirrio, Missolonghi, Agrinio, Amfilochia, Arta and Filippiada. The EO5 between Rio and Antirrio requires using a ferry to cross the Strait of Rio, which remains in operation even after the opening of the Rio–Antirrio Bridge in 2004.

The EO5 forms part of the European route E951 from Missolonghi to an A5 motorway (Ionia Odos) interchange at Kouvaras, where it meets the E55, and the E952 from Agrinio to said interchange: the E951 runs via Agrinio, while the E55 now bypasses the town via the A5 motorway.

== History ==
Ministerial Decision G25871 of 9 July 1963 created the EO5 from the old EO18 and EO52, which existed by royal decree from 1955–1963: the old EO18 followed the same route as the current EO5 north of Antirrio, while the old EO52 crossed the Strait of Rio. Until 1975, the entirety of the EO5 formed part of the old European route E19.
