= Pedini, Greece =

Pedini Πεδινή
- Community
- Location within Greece
- Coordinates: 39°36′0″N 20°50′30″E
- Country: Greece
- Administrative region: Epirus
- Regional unit: Ioannina
- Municipality: Ioannina
- Municipal unit: Bizani

Area
  - Community: 16.721 km^{2} (6.456 sq mi)
- Elevation: 489 m (1,604 ft)

Population (2021)
  - Community: 2,605
  - Density: 155.8/km^{2} (403.5/sq mi)
- Time zone: UTC+2 (EET)
  - Summer (DST): UTC+3 (EEST)

Pedini (Greek: Πεδινή, before 1928: Ραψίστα - Rapsista) is a village in the municipal unit of Bizani, Ioannina regional unit, Greece. In 2021 its population was 2,605. Between 1997 and 2010, it was the seat of the municipality Bizani. It lies 8 km south of the city centre of Ioannina, near the A2 motorway (Egnatia Odos).

== See also ==
- List of settlements in the Ioannina regional unit
