= Greek National Road 20 =

Trunk road in Greece

Coordinates: 40.2017°N 21.1942°E

National Road 20
- Εθνική Οδός 20
- Route of the EO20 and Vatero–Koila national roads, in blue
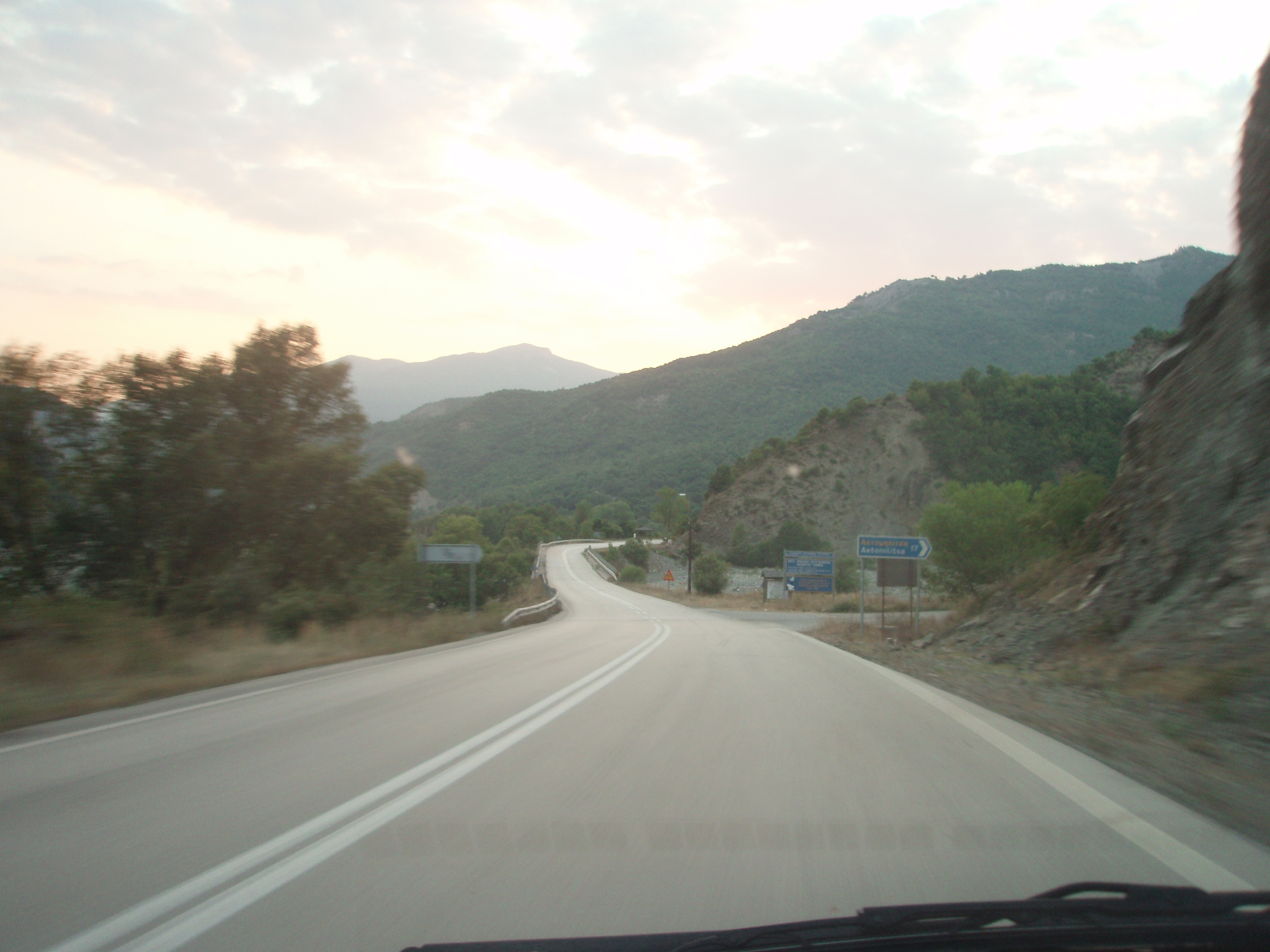
- EO20 between Eptachori and Pyrsogianni

Route information
- Part of E853 (Kalpaki–Ioannina)
- Length: 214.6 km (133.3 mi)
- Existed: 9 July 1963–present

Major junctions
- East end: Kozani
- West end: Ioannina

Location
- Country: Greece
- Regions: Western Macedonia; Epirus
- Primary destinations: Kozani; Siatista (Bara); Neapoli; Tsotyli; Pentalofos; Eptachori; Konitsa; Kalpaki; Ioannina

Highway system
- Highways in Greece; Motorways; National roads
← EO19	→ EO21

National Road 20 (Greek: Εθνική Οδός 20), abbreviated as the EO20, is a national road in northwestern Greece. It links the cities of Ioannina and Kozani via Konitsa and Siatista. It passes through the Ioannina, Kastoria and the Kozani regional units. Since the opening of the A2 motorway (Egnatia Odos), it is no longer the fastest connection between Kozani and Ioannina. The section between Ioannina and Kalpaki is part of the European route E853.

== Route ==
The EO20 is officially defined as a route through the Pindus mountain range and around the northwestern boundaries of Pindus National Park: it runs between Kozani to the east and Ioannina to the west, via Bara (Siatista), Neapoli, Tsotyli, Pentalofos, Eptachori, Konitsa and Kalpaki. The EO20 overlaps with the EO15, between Siatista and Neapoli.

The EO20 forms part of the European route E853 from Kalpaki to Ioannina. The EO20 is nowadays a scenic route, because the A2 motorway (Egnatia Odos), which carries the E90, provides a faster route between Kozani and Ioannina.

== History ==
Ministerial Decision G25871 of 9 July 1963 created the EO20 from part of the short-lived EO32 from Kozani to Bara (Siatista), part of the old EO33 from Bara to Neapoli, and the old EO28 from Neapoli to Ioannina. Until 1975, the EO20 formed part of the old European route E19 from Kalpaki to Ioannina.

== Vatero–Koila National Road ==
The Vatero–Koila National Road (Greek: Εθνική Οδός Βατερού - Κοίλων) is an unnumbered, single carriageway branch of the EO20 in Kozani, running from Vatero in the west to Koila and the EO3 in the north: the branch is about 7.99 kilometres (4.96 miles) long, and acts as the northwestern bypass around the city. The Vatero–Koila National Road was defined by the National Statistical Service of Greece (ESYE) in 1998, numbering it the EO20β for statistical purposes.
