= Lake Amvrakia =

- Ambracia
- Αμβρακία (Greek)
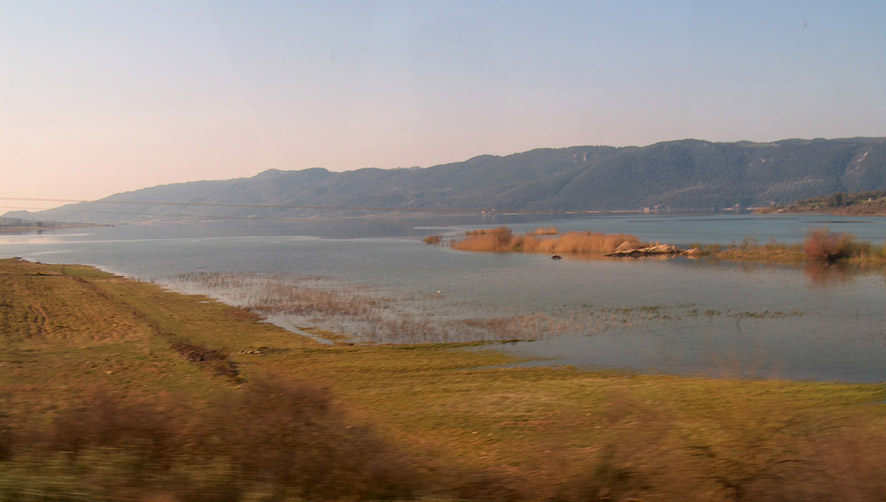
- Lake Amvrakia

- Location within Greece
- Location: Aetolia-Acarnania, Greece
- Coordinates: 38.752°N 21.178°E
- Type: lake
- Max. length: 13.8 kilometres (8.6 mi)
- Max. width: 3.8 kilometres (2.4 mi)
- Max. depth: 40 metres (130 ft)

Lake Amvrakia or Ambracia (Greek: Αμβρακία) is a freshwater lake in Aetolia-Acarnania, in western Greece. It lies between the towns of Agrinio and Amphilochia, and is 13.8 kilometres (8.6 mi) long, 3.8 kilometres (2.4 mi) wide and has a maximum depth of 40 metres (130 ft). It is a Natura 2000 protected habitat.

== Origin ==
Lake Amvrakia was a result of tectonic movement. It is karstic and semipolje type. The lake formed from deposits of Mesozoic limestone.

== Location and Geology ==
Lake Amvrakia lies along a depression northwest of Lake Ozeros and west of Mount Thyamos or Petalas. Its total surface area used to be 13.6 km^{2}, but that area has shrunk drastically in recent years. One of the reasons for this reduction in size was a long drought and the other was the draining of the shallow northern section of the basin, which is currently cut off by an embankment created for the national highway. This drainage had a severe impact on the lake's size, owing to the small size of the basin (112 km^{2}.).

== Important species ==
Pseudobithynia ambrakis, a species of Bithyniidae (snails) that has only been found in lake Amvrakia.

== Threats ==
Hydraulic activity with the karstic aquifers, evaporation during summer, and use of water for irrigation result in fluctuating water levels with each passing year. The lake is unique from other nearby lakes in its high sulphuric anions concentration. The lake's waters are polluted, although not alarmingly, by the runoff from the tobacco plantations lying to eastern and southern regions of the drainage basin. The lake's east coast is cultivated heavily, the fields reaching almost to the shore. The uncultivated areas on the lake's shore are used as pastures for cattle.
