= Kalpaki, Ioannina =

Kalpaki Καλπάκι
- Municipal unit
- Location within the regional unit

- Location within Greece
- Coordinates: 39°53′N 20°37′E
- Country: Greece
- Administrative region: Epirus
- Regional unit: Ioannina
- Municipality: Pogoni

Area
  - Municipal unit: 116.756 km^{2} (45.080 sq mi)
  - Community: 13.189 km^{2} (5.092 sq mi)

Population (2021)
  - Municipal unit: 1,534
  - Municipal unit density: 13.14/km^{2} (34.03/sq mi)
  - Community: 553
  - Community density: 41.9/km^{2} (109/sq mi)
- Time zone: UTC+2 (EET)
  - Summer (DST): UTC+3 (EEST)
- Vehicle registration: ΙΝ

Kalpaki (Greek: Καλπάκι) is a former municipality in the Ioannina regional unit, Epirus, Greece. Since the 2011 local government reform it has been part of the municipality Pogoni, of which it is a municipal unit. It is situated about 30 km (19 mi) northwest of Ioannina, and southwest of Konitsa. The municipal unit has an area of 116.756 km^{2}, and the community 13.189 km^{2}. The EO20 road connects Kalpaki with Ioannina and Konitsa. The EO22 connects Kalpaki with Kakavia, the border crossing into southern Albania.

== Subdivisions ==
The municipal unit Kalpaki is subdivided into the following communities (constituent villages in brackets):

- Kalpaki (Kalpaki, Lioumpa)
- Ano Ravenia
- Chrysorrachi
- Doliana (Doliana, Agios Georgios Dolianon)
- Geroplatanos
- Kato Ravenia
- Mavrovouni
- Negrades

== History ==
In the interwar period, the site of Kalpaki was a cluster of a few straw huts used by people working their fields on the plain. After 1945, its location as a road intersection for north–eastern and south–western routes attracted inhabitants to settle and work. Thus following the Second World War, Kalpaki replaced Doliana, located among hilly terrain as a regional centre, due in part to its accessibility on the Doliana plain.

On 7 January 2026 at 04:00 EET (02:00 UTC), an IF2 tornado hit Kalpaki: the tornado destroyed a poultry farm, killing tens of thousands of chickens. The tornado also significantly damaged two other buildings, both of which had partially collapsed walls. A church, watchtowers and other structures were also damaged. This would become one of the worst tornadoes in Europe in 2026.

== Demographics ==
Year	Settlement population	Community population	Municipal unit population
1981	586	-	-
1991	521	-	2,874
2001	558	754	2,324
2011	625	625	1,719
2021	547	553	1,534

The majority of inhabitants are Sarakatsani. These include former transhumant pastoralists, as well as those who previously lived in mountainous villages like Elafotopos in Zagori before settling in Kalpaki during the 1970s and 1980s.

== See also ==
- List of settlements in the Ioannina regional unit
