= List of former toponyms in Kavala Prefecture =

Some inhabited places in Kavala Prefecture of Greece have additional forms to ones officially used. Some of the forms are identifiably of Greek origin, others of Slavic, yet others of Turkish or more obscure origins.

Slavic language
Turkish language

Slavic name(s)	Current official name other Greek names	Prefecture	Geographic Coordinates	Citation	Population (2010)	Other
Bel Pesok (Бел Песок)	Aspri Ammos (Άσπρη Άμμος)	Kavala	40°57′N 24°27′E	p. 209	50	
Badem Chiflik, Bademli Chiflik (Бадем Чифлик, Бадемли Чифлик)	Amigdaleon (Αμυγδαλεών)	Kavala	40°58′N 24°22′E	p. 209	2,700	
Balushka, Balchik Chiflik (Балушка, Балчик Чифлик)	Polystylo, Nea Abdera (Πολύστυλον, Νέα Άβδηρα)	Kavala	40°59′N 24°20′E	p. 210	450	
Bereketli, Dolno Bereketli (Берекетли, Долно Берекетли)	Daton (Δάτον)	Kavala	40°48′N 24°19′E	p. 210	274	
Bunardzhik (Бунарџик)	Vrisoula (Βρυσούλα)	Kavala	41°02′N 24°20′E	p. 210		
Vasilakj Chiflik (Василаќ Чифлик)	Stavros, Diasavrosis (Σταυρός, Διασταυρωσις)	Kavala	40°57′N 24°22′E	p. 210		
Gorno Bereketli (Горно Берекетли)	Mikrochori, Ano Daton (Μικροχώριον, Άνω Δάτον)	Kavala	40°58′N 24°20′E	p. 211	87	
Gorno Chinar (Горно Чинар)	Ano Lefki (Άνω Λεύκη)	Kavala	41°59′N 24°31′E	p. 211	5	
Eski Kavala, Stara Kavala (Ески Кавала, Стара Кавала)	Palaia Kavala (Παλαιά Καβάλα)	Kavala	41°01′N 24°25′E	p. 211	120	
Juren Dere, Oren Dere (Јурен Дере, Орен Дере)	Orino (Ορεινό)	Kavala	41°03′N 24°29′E	p. 212		
K'zeli, Kizeli (К'зели, Кизели)	Kranochorion (Κρανοχώριον)	Kavala	41°04′N 24°29′E	p. 212	15	
K'nali, Kinali (К'нали, Кинали)	Kokkinochoma (Κοκκινόχωμα)	Kavala	40°56′N 24°19′E	p. 213	1,746	
Kurita, Korita (Курита, Корита)	Koryfes (Κορυφές, Κορυφαί)	Kavala	41°03′N 24°27′E	p. 213		
Kurtlu, Kurtli (Куртлу, Куртли)	Lykostoma (Λυκόστομον)	Kavala	41°07′N 24°27′E	p. 214	88	
Kurudzhu, Kuridzhe (Куруџу, Куриџе)	Kryoneri (Κρυονέριον)	Kavala	41°02′N 24°23′E	p. 214	40	
Madzhar, Madzhar Chiflik (Маџар, Маџар Чифлик)	Lydia (Λυδία)	Kavala	41°03′N 24°17′E	p. 214	950	
Mukhaly (Мухаљ)	Vounochorion (Βουνοχώριον)	Kavala	41°04′N 24°22′E	p. 214	219	
Naipli (Наипли)	Polyneri (Πολύνερον)	Kavala	41°04′N 24°29′E	p. 215	28	
Prenchovo, Prendzhova (Пренчово, Пренџова)	Amissiana (Αμισιανά)	Kavala	40°56′N 24°21′E	p. 215	1,122	
Rakhche, Rakhcha (Рахче, Рахча)	Krinides (Κρηνίδες)	Kavala	41°02′N 24°18′E	p. 215	3,500	
Seljani, Siljan (Селјани, Силјан)	Filippoi (Φίλιπποι)	Kavala	41°02′N 24°20′E	p. 216	1.000	
Skinite Ktinotrofi, Kolibari Stochari (Скините Ктинотрофи, Колибари Сточари)	Apostolos Paulos, Agios Paulos (Απόστολος Παύλος, Άγιος Παύλος)	Kavala	41°01′N 24°17′E	p. 216		
Sujuchuk, Sujutchik (Сујучук, Сујутчик)	Limnia (Λιμνιά)	Kavala	41°05′N 24°24′E	p. 216	65	
Kjose Eljaz (Ќосе Елјаз)	Chalkero (Χαλκερόν)	Kavala	40°59′N 24°30′E	p. 217	365	
Chaprandi Chiflik (Чапранди Чифлик)	Nea Karvali (Νέα Καρβάλη)	Kavala	40°58′N 24°31′E	p. 217	1,700	
Chinar, Chinar Dere (Чинар, Чинар Дере)	Lefki (Λεύκη)	Kavala	41°00′N 24°31′E	p. 218	17	
Dzhari (Џари)	Kounoupia (Κουνουπιά)	Kavala	40°59′N 24°28′E	p. 218	100	
Avli Kjoj (Авли Ќој)	Afli, Gefira Aflis (Αυλή, Γέφυρα Αυλής)	Kavala	40°53′N 24°10′E	p. 221	556	
Akhatlar, Atlar (Ахатлар, Атлар)	Mikrochori (Μικροχώριον)	Kavala	40°51′N 24°03′E	p. 222		
Boblen (Боблен)	Akropotamos (Ακροπόταμος)	Kavala	40°47′N 24°02′E	p. 222	693	
Bostandzhili (Бостанџили)	Kipia (Κηπία)	Kavala	40°54′N 24°12′E	p. 222	611	
Velidzhilar, Veldzheler, Veldzhiler (Велиџилар, Велџелер, Велџилер)	Dimaras (Δημαράς)	Kavala	40°51′N 24°09′E	p. 223		
Vlakhika (Βλάχικα)	Neo Sirako (Νέο Συράκο)	Kavala	40°56′N 24°15′E	p. 223		
Goreni, Gorijan (Горени, Горијан)	Georgiani (Γεωργιανή)	Kavala	40°57′N 24°09′E	p. 223	706	
Gorno Drenovo (Горно Дреново)	Ano Chorokopion (Άνω Χορτοκόπιον)	Kavala	40°55′N 24°13′E	p. 223	46	
Deve Kiran (Деве Киран)	Melissa (Μέλισσα)	Kavala	40°52′N 24°12′E	p. 224	221	
Devekli, Delekli (Девекли, Делекли)	Karavangeli (Καραβαγγέλης)	Kavala	40°51′N 24°10′E	p. 224	395	
Dede Bali (Деде Бали)	Galipsos (Γαληψός)	Kavala	40°49′N 23°57′E	p. 224	433	
Demirli (Демирли)	Sidirochorion (Σιδηροχώριον)	Kavala	40°51′N 24°09′E	p. 224	221	
Dolna Lokvitsa (Долна Локвица)	Ofryni, Kato Lakkovika (Οφρύνιον, Κάτω Λακκοβίκια)	Kavala	40°48′N 23°55′E	p. 225	831	
Dolno Kochan (Долно Кочан)	Panagia, Kato Akrovounion (Παναγιά, Κάτω Ακροβούνιον)	Kavala	40°54′N 24°15′E	p. 225	661	
Dranich, Drenich (Дранич, Дренич)	Antifilippoi (Αντιφίλιπποι)	Kavala	40°57′N 24°13′E	p. 225	1,073	
Drezna (Дрезна)	Myrtofyto (Μυρτόφυτον)	Kavala	40°50′N 24°12′E	p. 226	484	
Drenovo (Дреново)	Chortokopion (Χορτοκόπιον)	Kavala	40°56′N 24°14′E	p. 226	384	
Durmuzlu, Durmushli (Дурмузлу, Дурмушли)	Mesotopos (Μεσότοπος)	Kavala	40°51′N 24°10′E	p. 226		
Eledzhik, Elidzhik (Елеџик, Елиџик)	Aetoplagia (Αετοπλαγιά)	Kavala	40°53′N 24°11′E	p. 226		
Eni Kjoj, Arnaut Makhala (Ени Ќој, Арнаут Махала)	Arvanitochori (Αρβανιτοχώρι)	Kavala	40°44′N 24°07′E	p. 226		
Isirli, Esirli (Исирли, Есирли)	Platanotopos (Πλατανότοπος)	Kavala	40°51′N 24°04′E	p. 227	631	
Kale Chiflik (Кале Чифлик)	Nea Peramos (Νέα Πέραμος)	Kavala	40°50′N 24°18′E	p. 227	2,468	
Karjan, Karmani (Карјан, Кармани)	Kariani (Καριανή)	Kavala	40°45′N 23°59′E	p. 227	696	
Kosrup, Kusorob (Косруп, Кусороб)	Mesoropi (Μεσορόπη)	Kavala	40°52′N 24°05′E	p. 228	610	
Kochan, Kochani, Kochen (Кочан, Кочани, Кочен)	Akrovounion (Ακροβούνιον)	Kavala	40°54′N 24°13′E	p. 228		
Kulali (Кулали)	Pirgochorion (Πυργοχώριον)	Kavala	40°52′N 24°09′E	p. 228	147	
Kuchkar (Кучкар)	Eleochori (Ελαιοχώριον)	Kavala	40°50′N 24°14′E	p. 228	1,126	
Leftera (Лефтера)	Eleftheres (Ελευθερές, Ελευθεραί)	Kavala	40°51′N 24°16′E	p. 229	1,325	
Mesheli (Мешели)	Drias (Δρυάς)	Kavala	40°57′N 24°11′E	p. 229		
Moshtjan, Meshtena (Моштјан, Мештена)	Moustheni (Μουσθένη)	Kavala	40°52′N 24°07′E	p. 230	1,075	
Mursali (Мурсали)	Monokaridia (Μονοκαρυδιά)	Kavala	40°52′N 24°11′E	p. 230		
Nuzla (Нузла)	Agios Andreas (Άγιος Ανδρέας)	Kavala	40°52′N 24°17′E	p. 231	314	
Osmanli (Османли)	Chrysokastro (Χρυσόκαστρον)	Kavala	40°53′N 24°12′E	p. 232	645	
Podgorjani (Подгорјани)	Podochori (Ποδοχώριον)	Kavala	40°50′N 24°01′E	p. 233	665	
Pravishte, Pravishta (Правиште, Правишта)	Eleftheroupoli (Ελευθερούπολη, Ελευθερούπολης)	Kavala	40°55′N 24°15′E	p. 233	4,898	
Rekhimli, Rakhimli (Рехимли, Рахимли)	Mesia (Μεσιά)	Kavala	40°52′N 24°11′E	p. 233	191	
Samokov, Samokovo (Самоков, Самоково)	Domatia (Δωμάτια)	Kavala	40°52′N 24°09′E	p. 234	590	
Toblyani, Golemo Toblyani, Toler (Тобљани, Големо Тобљани, Толер)	Exochi (Εξοχή)	Kavala	40°53′N 24°14′E	p. 234	173	
Tuzla (Тузла)	Touzla (Τούζλα)	Kavala	40°46′N 23°55′E	p. 234		
Chetakli, Chatakli (Четакли, Чатакли)	Melissokomio (Μελισσοκομείον)	Kavala	40°52′N 24°10′E	p. 234	365	
Chista, Chuste (Чиста, Чусте)	Folia (Φωλεά)	Kavala	40°49′N 24°09′E	p. 235	575	
Chiflik (Чифлик)	Trita (Τρίτα)	Kavala	40°51′N 24°02′E	p. 235		
Sharli, S'rli (Шарли, С'рли)	Kokkinochorion (Κοκκινοχώριον)	Kavala	40°49′N 24°00′E	p. 235	284	
Agalar (Агалар)	Krini (Κρήνη)	Kavala	41°04′N 24°45′E	p. 237	50	
Alakhanli, Akhlanli (Алаханли, Ахланли)	Achladini (Αχλαδινή)	Kavala	41°04′N 24°32′E	p. 237		
Barakli, Bajrakli (Баракли, Бајракли)	Stenopos (Στενωπός)	Kavala	41°03′N 24°39′E	p. 238		
Beklemesh, Beklimesh (Беклемеш, Беклимеш)	Dialekto (Διαλεκτόν)	Kavala	41°04′N 24°43′E	p. 238	128	
Bedzheli (Беџели)	Drimousa (Δρυμούσα)	Kavala	40°58′N 24°44′E	p. 238		
Bojnus Kizili, Bojnu Kaz'l (Бојнус Кизили, Бојну Каз'л)	Gerontas (Γέροντας)	Kavala	41°02′N 24°40′E	p. 239	450	
Gaziler, Kaziler (Газилер, Казилер)	Nikiti (Νικηταί)	Kavala	41°04′N 24°36′E	p. 239	5	
Gedikli, Edikli, Kedikli (Гедикли, Едикли, Кедикли)	Ekali (Εκάλη)	Kavala	41°01′N 24°38′E	p. 240	79	
Darova, Dari Eva (Дарова, Дари Ева)	Kechrokampos (Κεχρόκαμπος)	Kavala	41°09′N 24°38′E	p. 240	522	
Dede Dag (Деде Даг)	Agiovouni (Αγιοβούνι)	Kavala	41°01′N 24°31′E	p. 240		
Dojran, Dojranli (Дојран, Дојранли)	Gravouna (Γραβούνα)	Kavala	41°00′N 24°41′E	p. 240	849	
Domashli (Домашли)	Ano Pontolivado (Άνω Ποντολίβαδον, Ποντολίβαδον)	Kavala	40°59′N 24°35′E	p. 241	138	
Eni Kjoj (Ени Ќој)	Nea Komi (Νέα Κώμη)	Kavala	40°59′N 24°34′E	p. 241	50	
Eretli Makhale, Eski Sari Shaban (Еретли Махале, Ески Сари Шабан)	Eratino (Ερατεινόν)	Kavala	40°57′N 24°38′E	p. 242	883	
Eski Kjoj (Ески Ќој)	Palaia Komi (Παλαιά Κώμη)	Kavala	40°59′N 24°38′E	p. 242		
Imrenli (Имренли)	Kinigos (Κυνηγός)	Kavala	41°05′N 24°30′E	p. 242		
Indzhes, Indzheler (Инџес, Инџелер)	Paradisos (Παράδεισος)	Kavala	41°05′N 24°45′E	p. 242	429	
Kavadzhik (Каваџик)	Lefkadion (Λευκάδιον)	Kavala	41°03′N 24°35′E	p. 243		
Kaja Bunar (Каја Бунар)	Petropigi, Doukalion (Πετροπηγή, Δουκάλιον)	Kavala	40°59′N 24°37′E	p. 243	530	
Kara Bej, Biljal Aga (Кара Беј, Билјал Ага)	Nea Karya (Νέα Καρυά)	Kavala	40°55′N 24°44′E	p. 243	1,734	
Kara Kadrli, Kara Kidarli (Кара Кадрли, Кара Кидарли)	Lithochorion (Λιθοχώριον)	Kavala	41°03′N 24°42′E	p. 244		
Karamanli (Караманли)	Agios Kosmas (Άγιος Κοσμάς)	Kavala	41°05′N 24°40′E	p. 244	35	
Karadzha Kjoj (Караџа Ќој)	Perni (Πέρνη)	Kavala	41°00′N 24°38′E	p. 244	941	
Karadzhilar (Караџилар)	Zarkadia (Ζαρκαδιά)	Kavala	41°01′N 24°38′E	p. 245	515	
Karadzhova, Karadzha Obasi (Караџова, Караџа Обаси)	Elafochori (Ελαφοχώριον)	Kavala	41°03′N 24°33′E	p. 245	118	
Karga Makhale (Карга Махале)	Kryoneri (Κρυονέριον)	Kavala	41°02′N 24°36′E	p. 245	619	
Kenes, Kinez (Кенес, Кинез)	Proasti (Προάστιον)	Kavala	40°58′N 24°42′E	p. 245		
Keremetli (Кереметли)	Keramoti (Κεραμωτή)	Kavala	40°51′N 24°43′E	p. 245	1,228	
Kochoglar (Кочоглар)	Konstantinia (Κωνσταντινιά)	Kavala	41°06′N 24°37′E	p. 246		
Kuladzhik (Кулаџик)	Pirgiskos (Πυργίσκος)	Kavala	41°04′N 24°33′E	p. 246		
Kuri, Kuri Khumajun (Кури, Кури Хумајун)	Agiasma (Αγίασμα)	Kavala	40°55′N 24°39′E	p. 246	1,158	
Kurtalar (Курталар)	Likia (Λυκιά)	Kavala	41°05′N 24°31′E	p. 247		
Kuru Dere (Куру Дере)	Xerias (Ξεριάς)	Kavala	41°03′N 24°42′E	p. 247		
Kutundzhali, Susur Kjoj (Кутунџали, Сусур Ќој)	Piges (Πηγές, Πηγαί)	Kavala	40°54′N 24°40′E	p. 247		
Mundzhinos, Mundzhanos (Мунџинос, Мунџанос)	Lekani (Λεκάνη)	Kavala	41°10′N 24°33′E	p. 247	608	
Muratli (Муратли)	Skopos (Σκοπός)	Kavala	41°06′N 24°38′E	p. 248	25	
Mustafa Oglar (Мустафа Оглар)	Stegnon (Στεγνόν)	Kavala	41°04′N 24°47′E	p. 248	11	
Musha Makhale (Муша Махале)	Platania (Πλατανιά)	Kavala	41°03′N 24°35′E	p. 248	32	
Nederli (Недерли)	Disvato (Δύσβατον)	Kavala	41°04′N 24°34′E	p. 249	23	
Novo Kuru Dere (Ново Куру Дере)	Neos Xerias (Νέος Ξεριάς)	Kavala	41°02′N 24°43′E	p. 249	503	
Oladzhak (Олаџак)	Platamonas (Πλαταμών)	Kavala	41°06′N 24°32′E	p. 249	159	
Organdzhi, Organdzhilar (Органџи, Органџилар)	Chrysochori (Χρυσοχώριον)	Kavala	40°56′N 24°43′E	p. 249	1,793	
Novo Domashli (Ново Домашли)	Pontolivado (Ποντολίβαδον)	Kavala	40°58′N 24°35′E	p. 250	288	
Reshit Bej (Решит Беј)	Monastirakion (Μοναστηράκιον)	Kavala	40°53′N 24°44′E	p. 250	408	
Sari Shaban (Сари Шабан)	Chrysopoli, Sappei (Χρυσούπολη, Χρυσούπολης, Σαππαίοι)	Kavala	40°59′N 24°42′E	p. 250	8,004	
Sekeler (Секелер)	Pontias, Aspronera (Ποντιάς, Ασπρόνερα)	Kavala	40°59′N 24°42′E	p. 251		
Sependzheler, Sepecheler (Сепенџелер, Сепечелер)	Kalathas (Καλαθάς)	Kavala	41°06′N 24°34′E	p. 251		
Kasarin (Касарин)	Stratones (Στρατώνες)	Kavala	41°05′N 24°46′E	p. 251		
Tojlar, Tojler (Тојлар, Тојлер)	Peristereon (Περιστερεών)	Kavala	40°56′N 24°44′E	p. 252		
Kjosiler Balja (Ќосилер Балја)	Katochorion (Κατωχώριον)	Kavala	41°04′N 24°31′E	p. 252		
Kjosiler Zeir (Ќосилер Зеир)	Anochorion (Ανωχώριον)	Kavala	41°06′N 24°30′E	p. 252		
Uzun Kjoj (Узун Ќој)	Makrychori (Μακρυχώριον)	Kavala	41°03′N 24°37′E	p. 252	111	
Khadzhi Emin Aga (Хаџи Емин Ага)	Chaidevton (Χαϊδευτόν)	Kavala	40°52′N 24°43′E	p. 253	475	
Chajlik (Чајлик)	Dipotamos (Διπόταμος)	Kavala	41°08′N 24°35′E	p. 253	106	
Chobanli (Чобанли)	Avramilia (Αβραμυλιά)	Kavala	41°04′N 24°43′E	p. 254	27	
Kalive, Kolibi (Каливе, Колиби)	Prinos, Kalyvi Megalou Kazavitiou, Kalyvi Prinou, Mikron Kazavition (Πρίνος, Καλύβαι Μεγάλου Καζαβιτίου, Καλύβαι Πρίνου, Μικρόν Καζαβιτίον)	Kavala	40°45′N 24°35′E	p. 256	1,185	on Thasos
Megalon Kazavition (Μεγάλο Καζαβίτιον)	Megalos Prinos, Prinos (Μεγάλος Πρίνος, Πρίνος)	Kavala	40°44′N 24°38′E	p. 259	30	on Thasos
Skala Megalu Kazavitiu (Σκάλα Μεγάλου Καζαβιτίου)	Ormos Prinou, Epinion Megalou Kazavitiou, Ormos Kazavitiou, Skala Prinou (Όρμος Πρίνου, Επίνιον Μεγάλου Καζαβιτίου, Όρμος Καζαβιτίου, Σκάλα Πρίνου)	Kavala	40°45′N 24°35′E	p. 261	122	on Thasos
Zlaten Breg (Златен Брег)	Chrysi Akti (Χρυσή Ακτή)	Kavala	40°42′N 24°47′E	p. 262		on Thasos
