= List of settlements in the Kavala regional unit =

This is a list of settlements in the Kavala regional unit in Greece:

- Agiasma
- Agios Andreas
- Agios Kosmas
- Akropotamos
- Amisiana
- Amygdaleonas
- Ano Lefki
- Antifilippoi
- Avli
- Avramylia
- Chalkero
- Chrysochori
- Chrysokastro
- Chrysoupoli
- Dialekto
- Dipotamos
- Domatia
- Dysvato
- Elafochori
- Elaiochori
- Eleftheres
- Eleftheroupoli
- Erateino
- Filippoi
- Folea
- Galipsos
- Georgiani
- Gerontas
- Gravouna
- Kariani
- Kavala
- Kechrokampos
- Keramoti
- Kipia
- Kokkinochoma
- Koryfes
- Krinides
- Kryoneri
- Lefki
- Lekani
- Limnia
- Lydia
- Makrychori
- Melissokomeio
- Mesia
- Mesoropi
- Moustheni
- Myrtofyto
- Nea Iraklitsa
- Nea Karvali
- Nea Karya
- Nea Peramos
- Nikisiani
- Neos Zygos
- Orfani
- Orfynio
- Palaia Kavala
- Palaiochori
- Paradeisos
- Perni
- Petropigi
- Piges
- Platamonas
- Platanotopos
- Podochori
- Polynero
- Polystylo
- Pontolivado
- Sidirochori
- Xerias
- Zarkadia
- Zygos

== See also ==
- Slavic toponyms of places in Kavala Prefecture
- List of towns and villages in Greece
