= A2 motorway (Greece) =

Motorway in Greece

A2 motorway
- Αυτοκινητόδρομος Α2
- Egnatia Odos; Εγνατία Οδός
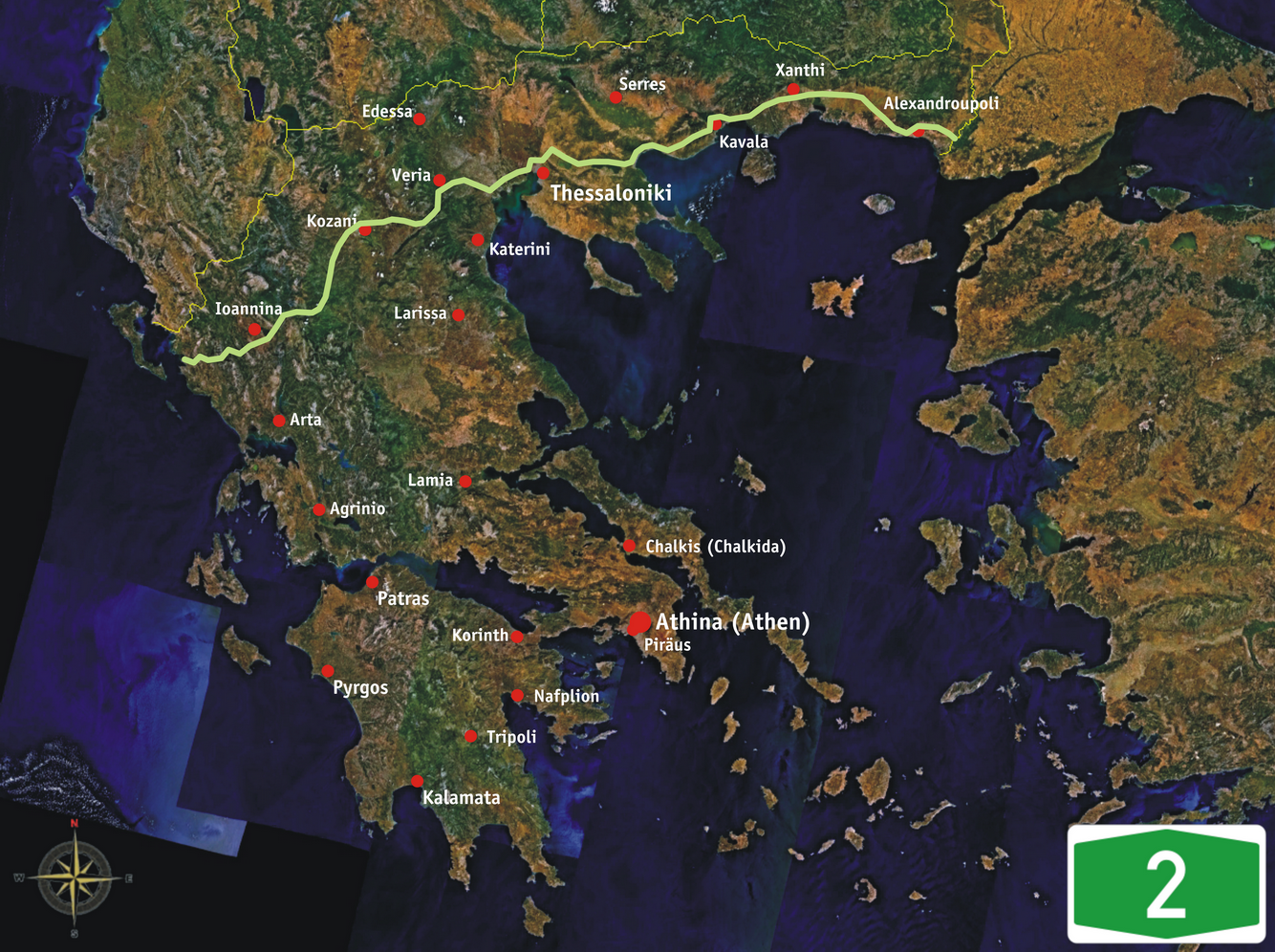

Route information
- Part of E75 (Kleidi–Kalochori), E79 (Efkarpia–Lagkadas), E90, and E92 (Igoumenitsa–Panagia)
- Length: 670 km (420 mi)

Major junctions
- West end: Igoumenitsa
- East end: Border with Turkey (Kipoi)

Location
- Country: Greece
- Regions: Epirus; Thessaly; Western Macedonia; Central Macedonia; Eastern Macedonia and Thrace
- Primary destinations: Igoumenitsa; Ioannina; Metsovo; Grevena; Kozani; Veria; Kleidi; Chalastra; Thessaloniki; Kavala; Xanthi; Komotini; Alexandroupolis; Border with Turkey (Kipoi)

Highway system
- Highways in Greece; Motorways; National roads
← A11	→ A21

The A2 motorway, also known as the Egnatia Odos (Greek: Εγνατία Οδός), is a tolled controlled-access highway in northern Greece that runs from the western port of Igoumenitsa to the eastern Greek–Turkish border at Kipoi. The entire route is part of the Greek section of the E90 road, which runs from Lisbon, Portugal in the west, and Zakho, Iraq in the east.

The A2 motorway runs a total of 670 km (420 mi). The megaproject began in 1994 and was completed in 2009 at a cost of €5.93 billion ($8.27 billion); it was managed by the state-owned company Egnatia Odos, S.A.

== Geography ==
The route traverses the mountainous Greek regions of Epirus and Macedonia, crossing the Pindos and Vermio mountain ranges, which posed formidable engineering challenges. It includes 76 tunnels (with a combined length of 99 km / 61.5 miles) and 1,650 bridges. It is a limited-access highway with sophisticated electronic surveillance measures, SCADA controls for the lighting/tunnel ventilation, and advanced vehicle collision absorption measures.

- Stretching: From the port of Igoumenitsa, Thesprotia to the border crossing of Kipoi, on the River Evros
- Total length: 670 kilometres
- Serving the regional units: Thesprotia – Ioannina – Grevena – Kozani – Imathia – Thessaloniki – Kavala – Xanthi – Rhodope – Evros.
- Linked with nine major vertical axes connecting to the neighbouring countries in the north (Albania, North Macedonia, Bulgaria, Turkey).
- Passing through the towns of: Igoumenitsa – Ioannina – Metsovo – Grevena – Kozani – Veroia – Thessaloniki – Kavala – Xanthi – Komotini – Alexandroupolis
- Linked to the Ports of: Igoumenitsa – Thessaloniki – Kavala – Alexandroupolis
- Linked to the Airports of: Ioannina – Kastoria – Kozani – Thessaloniki – Kavala – Alexandroupolis
- Technical characteristics: Two traffic lanes per direction, a central reserve and an emergency lane on the right.
- The area served accounts for:
  - 36% of the country's total population
  - 33% of its total gross national product
  - In the primary sector, 54% of total farmland and 65% of total irrigated land
  - In the secondary sector, 41% of total industrial employment, and
  - 51% of total mining activity.

Part of its length, a section of about 360 km (220 mi) from Evros to Thessaloniki, parallels the ancient Roman Via Egnatia, which ran from modern Durrës in Albania to Thessaloniki and thence to Byzantium (now Istanbul, Turkey). The project has therefore been dubbed a modern Via Egnatia (in Greek, Egnatia Odos / Εγνατία Οδός). However, the parallel is not exact; the original Via Egnatia was much longer (1,120 km / 696 miles) and its western section, from Thessaloniki to the Adriatic Sea, ran much further north than the modern road.

The project has raised concerns for the survival of nearby sites of ecological and archaeological significance. The construction of the Pindos stretch (i.e. from Grevena to Ioannina) was delayed due to environmental concerns about the destruction of the habitat of the endangered brown bear. However, a new routing was proposed in 2003, and this part was completed by April 2009.

In addition to the main highway, three perpendicular auxiliary highways are under construction connecting the highway to important cities, ports and airports of Macedonia.

== History ==
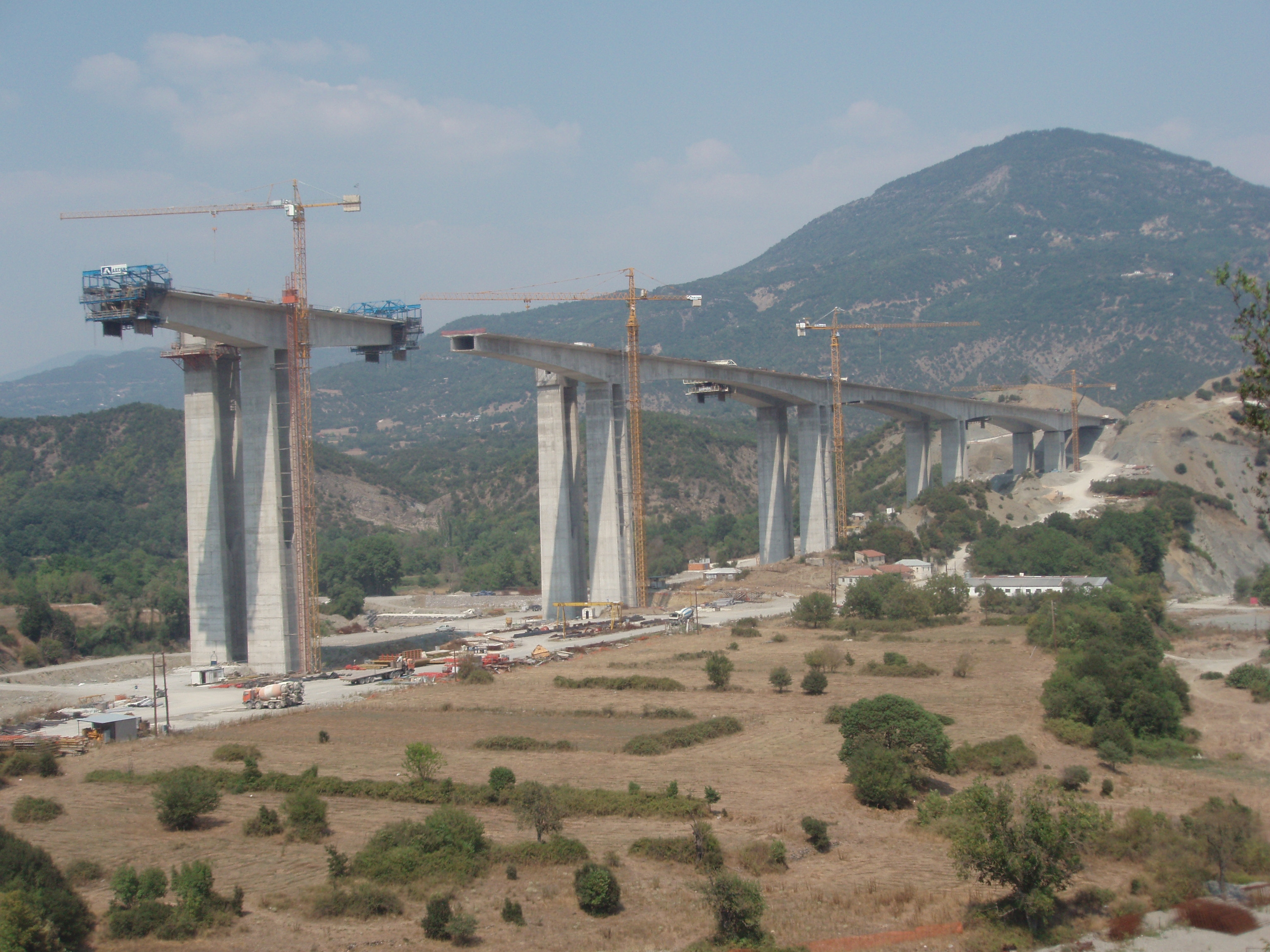
Arachthos river bridge under construction in 2008

94 km of the motorway had been built as part of other motorways, before the official project began in 1994. Between 1997 and 2004, 393 km of motorway were built. The main part of the project was completed by 30 May 2009. A final bridge was opened on 10 May 2014

== Exit list ==
Regional unit	km	mi	Exit	Name	Destinations	Notes
Thesprotia			—	Port of Igoumenitsa	New Port EO6 – Igoumenitsa; EO / E55 – Preveza	
Thesprotia			1	Igoumenitsa–Ladochori	Igoumenitsa, Graikochori Preveza (EO / E55), Igoumenitsa (Centre)	
Thesprotia			1Α	Vasilikos	Karteri, Vasilikos	
Thesprotia			1Β	Gkrika	Industrial Park, Grika, Psaka	No westbound exit
Thesprotia			2	Neochori	EO19 – Paramythia	
Thesprotia			2Α	Eleftherochori	Souli, Vereniki	Westbound entry via planned service area
Ioannina			Tyria Toll Station			
Ioannina			3	Selloi–Tyria	Tyria	
Ioannina			3Α	Agia Anastasia	Voutsaras, Polygyros	Westbound entry and exit only
Ioannina			4	Dodoni	Dodoni	
Ioannina			4Α	Pedini	A5 / E951 – Athens, Patras	
Ioannina			5	Ioannina	EO5 / E853 – Athens, Arta, Ioannina	
Ioannina			5Α	Pamvotida	Tzoumerka, Katsikas	
Ioannina			Pamvotida Toll Station			
Ioannina			5Β	Baltouma	EO6 – East Zagori, Mazia	Eastbound exit only
Ioannina			6	Arachthos–Zagori	EO6 – Zagori, Tzoumerka	
Ioannina			6Α	Chrisovitsa (Peristeri)	EO6 – Megalo Peristeri, Votonosi, Chrysovitsa	
Ioannina			7	Metsovo	EO6 – Metsovo	
Ioannina			7Α	Anilio	Anilio	Exit only
Trikala			Malakasi Toll Station			
Trikala			7Β	Panagia	EO6 / E92 – Athens, Trikala, Panagia	Toll station on the southern loopback
Grevena			8	E65 interchange	A3 – Athens, Lamia	
Grevena			8Α	Venetikos	Mavranaioi, Kipoureio	
Grevena			8Β	Grevena West–Kalambakas	EO15 – Trikala, Grevena (South)	
Grevena			9	Grevena East	EO15 – Grevena (East)	
Grevena			9Α	Taxiarchis	EO15 – Agios Georgios, Taxiarchis	
Kozani			9Β	Siatista West	A29 – Korçë (AL), Kastoria	
Kozani			10	Siatista East	EO20 – Siatista	Toll station on northbound exit and southbound entry
Kozani			Siatistia Toll Station			
Kozani			11	Kalamia	EO20 – Kozani, Larissa	Toll station on northbound entry and southbound exit
Kozani			12	Kozani	A27 / E65 – Skopje (MK), Florina, Ptolemaida A27 / E65 – Kozani, Larissa	
Kozani			13	Polymylos	EO4 – Polymylos	
Kozani			Polymylos Toll Station			
Imathia			14	Veria	Edessa, Naoussa, Veria	
Imathia			15	Kouloura	Kouloura	
Imathia			16	Niselli	EO1 – Alexandreia	
Imathia			Platanos Services			
Imathia			—	Kleidi	Kleidi	
Imathia			17	Kleidi	A1 / E75 – Athens, Katerini	Turn off to stay on Western end of concurrency with the A1 motorway
Thessaloniki			18	Malgara	Malgara	
Thessaloniki			Malgara Toll Station			
Thessaloniki			19	Axios	A1 / E75 – Evzonoi, Skopje (MK)	
Thessaloniki			—	Chalastra	Chalastra	Eastbound entry and westbound exit only
Thessaloniki			—	—	Local traffic	Eastbound entry and exit only
Thessaloniki			20	Sindos	Sindos	
Thessaloniki			—	—	Local traffic	Entry and exit through lay-bys
Thessaloniki			21	Kalochori	A1 / E75 – Thessaloniki, Kalochori	No entry from Kalochori; turn off to stay on Eastern end of concurrency with the A1 motorway
Thessaloniki			22	Ionia–Diavata	EO2 – Edessa, Thessaloniki, Evzonoi, Skopje (MK)	
Thessaloniki			Thessaloniki Toll Station			
Thessaloniki			23	Titan	A24 – Chalkidiki, Airport EO2 / E79 – Thessaloniki (Centre)	Turn off to stay on
Thessaloniki			23Α	Girokomeio	Thessaloniki, Veria, Edessa, Efkarpia	
Thessaloniki			—	—	Local traffic	No westbound entry
Thessaloniki			—	Serron	EO2 / EO12 – Kavala, Kilkis, Lagyna	Eastbound exit and westbound entry only
Thessaloniki			24	Langadas–Serron	A25 / E79 – Kilkis, Serres, Lagkadas	Toll station on northbound exit and southbound entry
Thessaloniki			Analipsi Toll Station			
Thessaloniki			25	Profitis	Lagkadikia, Profitis	Toll station on northbound entry and southbound exit
Thessaloniki			25Α	Vaiochori	Askos, Sochos, Megali Volvi	Toll station on northbound entry and southbound exit
Thessaloniki			26	Rentina	Rentina, Stavros, Mikra Volvi	
Thessaloniki			27	Vrasna–Asprovalta	EO2 – Asprovalta, Vrasna, Stavros	Toll station on northbound exit and southbound entry
Thessaloniki			Asprovalta Toll Station			
Serres			27Α	Kerdylia	Nea Kerdylia	
Serres			28	Strymonas	EO59 – Serres, Drama, Amphipolis	
Kavala			—	Ofrynio	EO – Ofrynio, Kariani	Eastbound exit only
Kavala			28Α	Galipsos–Orfani	Galipsos, Orfani	Toll station on northbound exit and southbound entry
Kavala			28Β	Moustheni	Moustheni, Sidirochori	Toll station on northbound exit and southbound entry
Kavala			Moustheni Toll Station			
Kavala			28Γ	Eleftheroupoli	EO2 – Eleftheroupoli, Exochi	Toll station on northbound entry and southbound exit
Kavala			29	Agios Andreas	EO – Nea Irakleitsa, Agios Andreas	Toll station on northbound entry and southbound exit
Kavala			30	Palio		Junction disused
Kavala			31	Agios Syllas	EO2 – Kavala, Drama	
Kavala			—	Aspra Chomata	EO2	Eastbound entry only
Kavala			32	Aspra Chomata	EO2 – Kavala (East), Filippos B' Port, Nea Karvali	Toll station on northbound exit and southbound entry
Kavala			Kavala Toll Station			
Kavala			—	Karvali	EO2 – Nea Karvali	Eastbound exit only
Kavala			32Α	Perni	EO2 – Thasos, Keramoti, Kavala Airport	Eastbound exit and westbound entry only
Kavala			33	Chrysoupoli	Chrysoupoli, Thasos, Zarkadia	
Kavala			—	Paradeisos	EO2	Westbound entry only
Xanthi			—	Thalassia	Evlalo, Toxotes, Thalassia	Eastbound exit only
Xanthi			34	Vaniano (Xanthi West)	Xanthi (West)	
Xanthi			35	Vafeika (Xanthi East)	EO2 – Xanthi (East), Porto Lagos, Fanari	Toll station on northbound exit and southbound entry
Rhodope			Iasmos Toll Station			
Rhodope			36	Iasmos	Iasmos	Toll station on northbound entry and southbound exit
Rhodope			37	Komotini West	EO2 – Komotini (West), Fanari	
Rhodope			38	Komotini East	A23 / EO2 – Komotini (East), Bulgaria, Industrial Area	
Rhodope			38Α	VIPE Komotini–Fylakas	Komotini (Industrial Area), Fylakas	Toll station on northbound exit and southbound entry
Rhodope			Mesti Toll Station			
Evros			39	Mesti	EO2 – Sapes, Mesti, Maroneia	Toll station on northbound entry and southbound exit
Evros			40	Makri	EO2 – Alexandroupolis, Makri, Dikella, Avra	
Evros			41	Alexandroupolis	Alexandroupolis	
Evros			—	Amfitriti	Port, Alexandroupoli Airport	Eastbound exit and westbound entry only
Evros			42	VIPE Alexandroupolis	Industrial Area, Alexandroupoli Airport	
Evros			Ardani Toll Station			
Evros			43	Ardani	EO51 / E85 – Soufli, Bulgaria, Feres	
Evros			—	Kipoi	EO2 – Turkey	Intersection
1.000 mi = 1.609 km; 1.000 km = 0.621 mi: Closed/former; Concurrency terminus; Incomplete access; Tolled

== Gallery ==
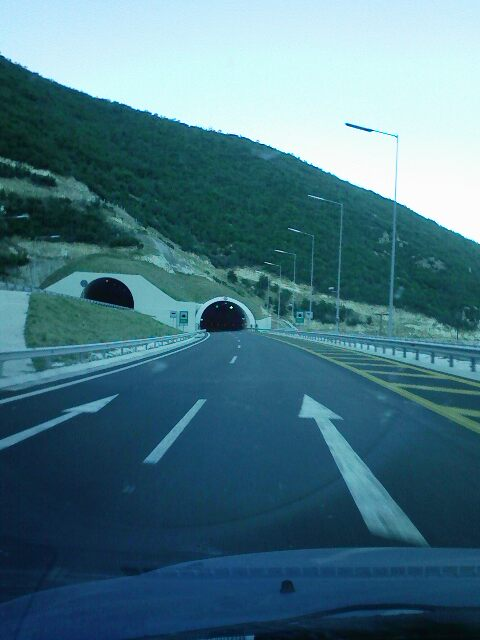
Tunnels between Kozani and Veria.

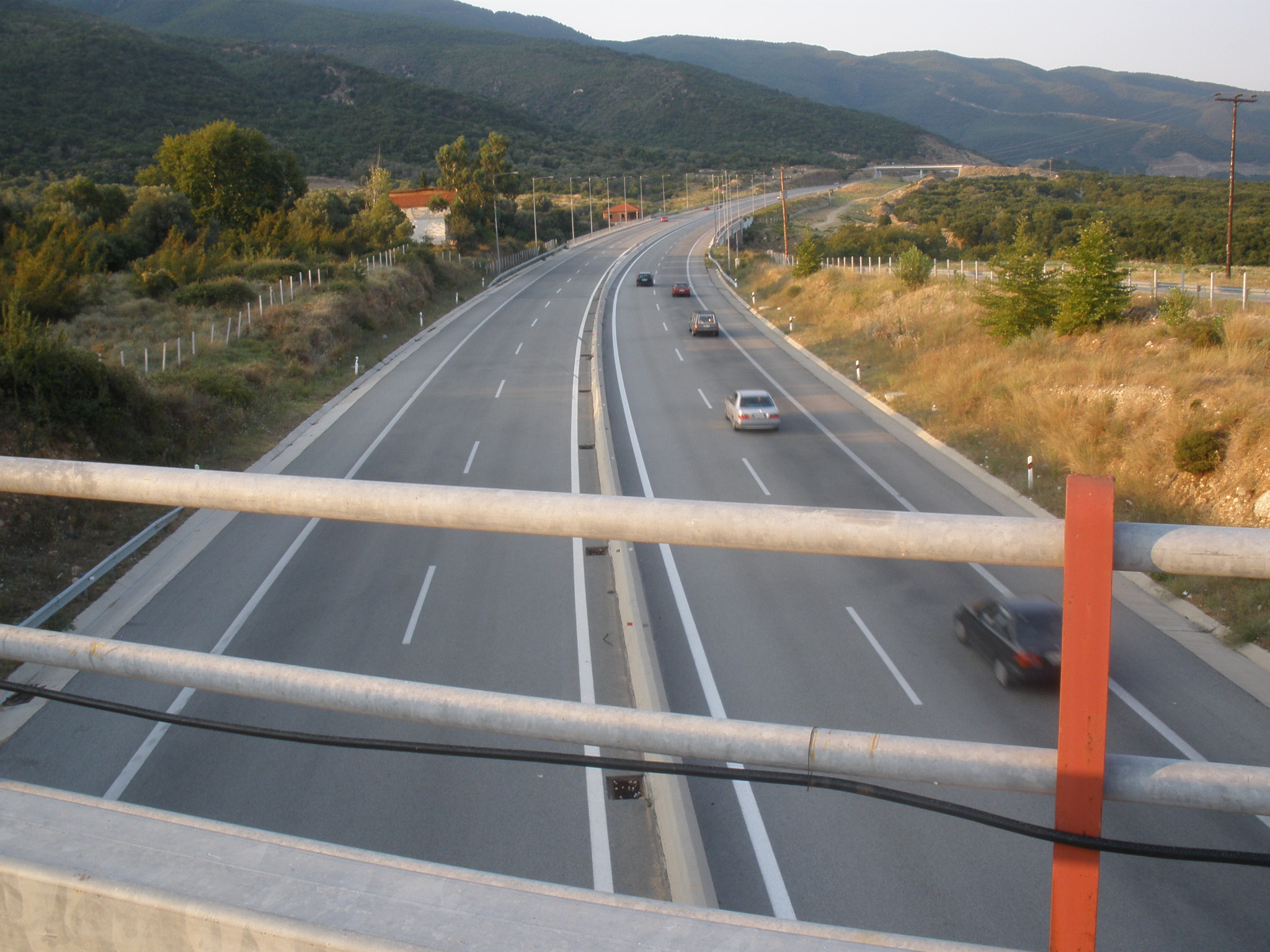
Egnatia Odos near Asprovalta.

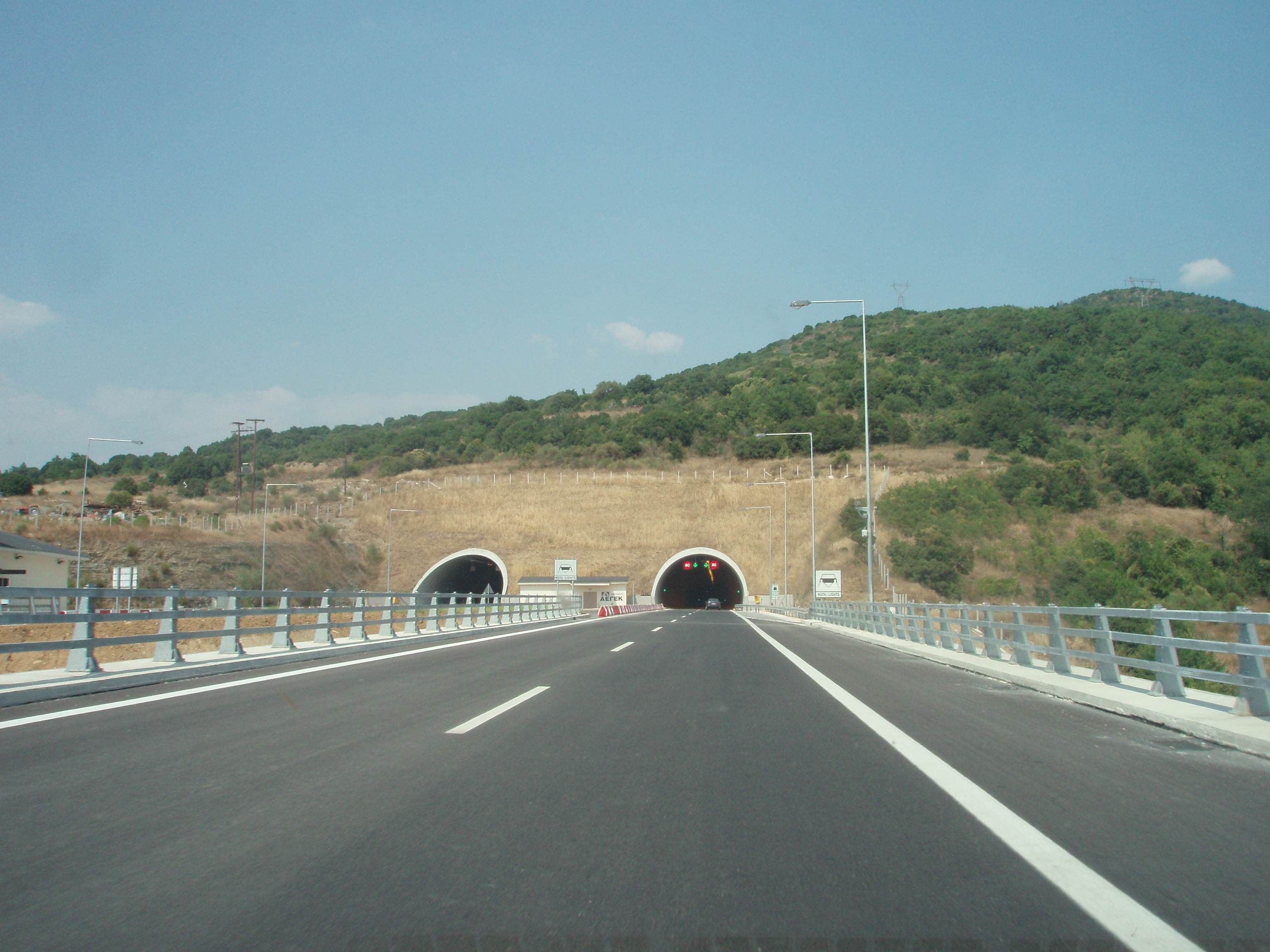
Driskos Tunnel near Ioannina.

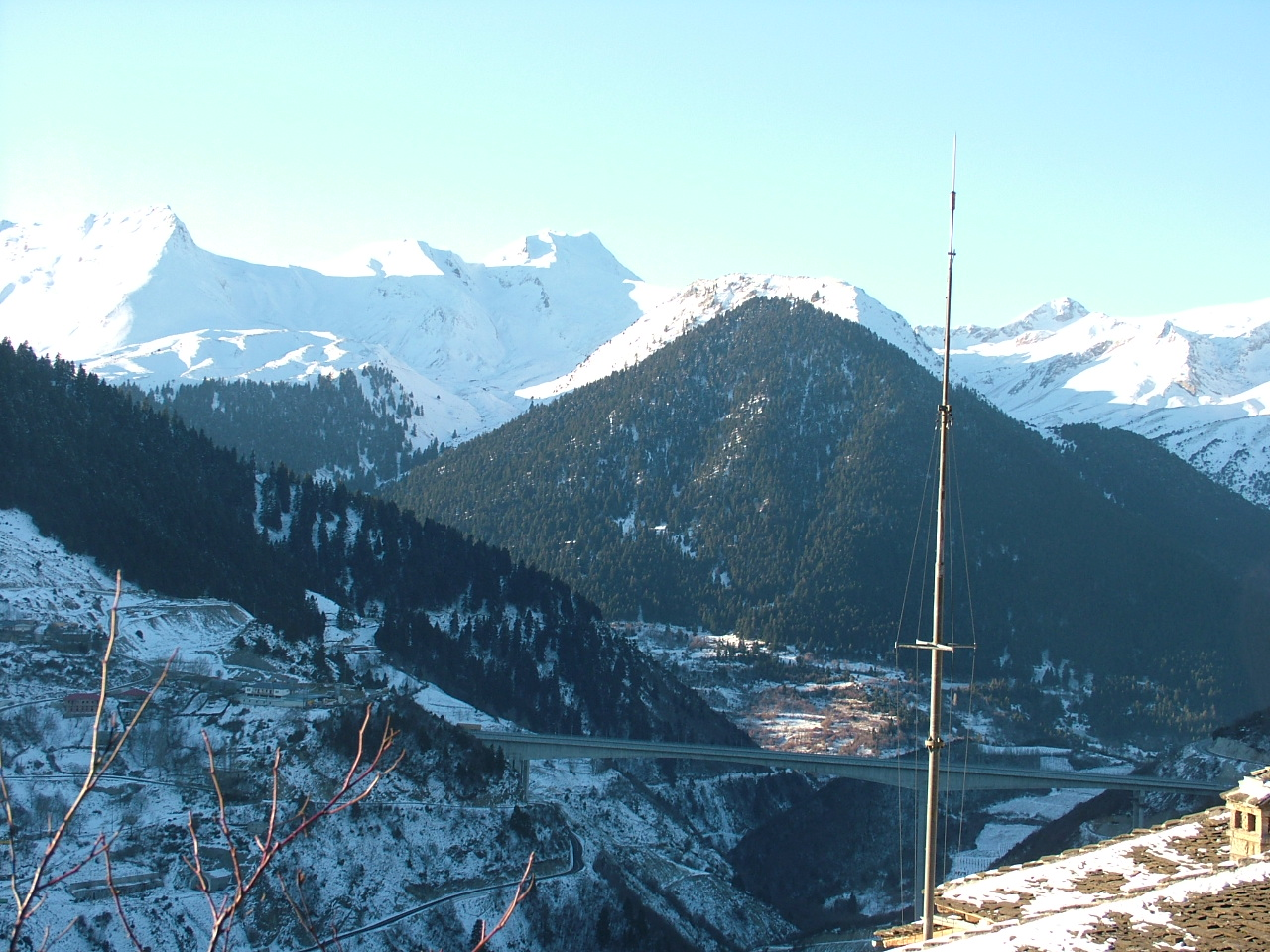
Egnatia Odos (A2) Metsovitikos bridge, as seen from Metsovo

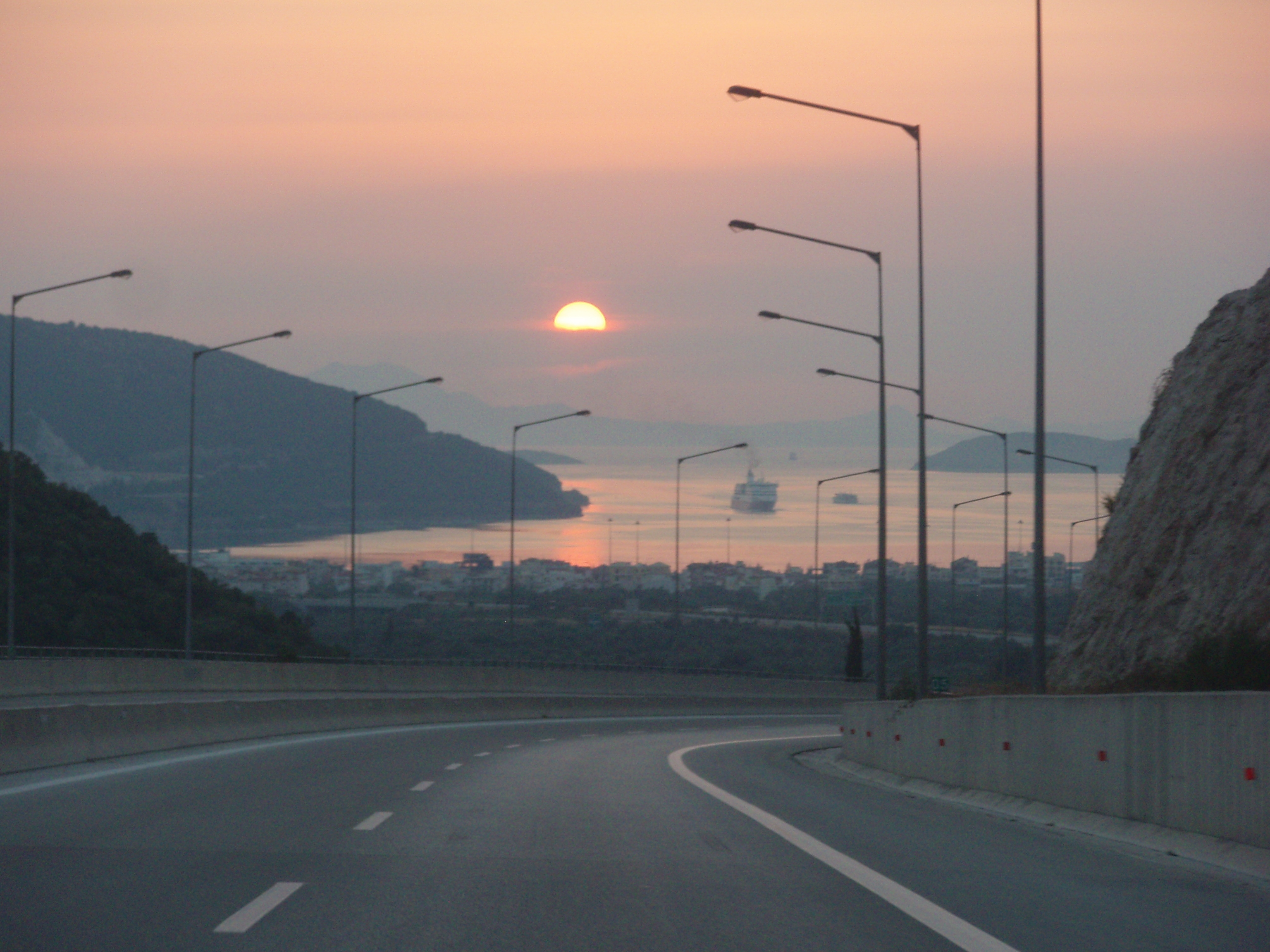
Near the port of Igoumenitsa

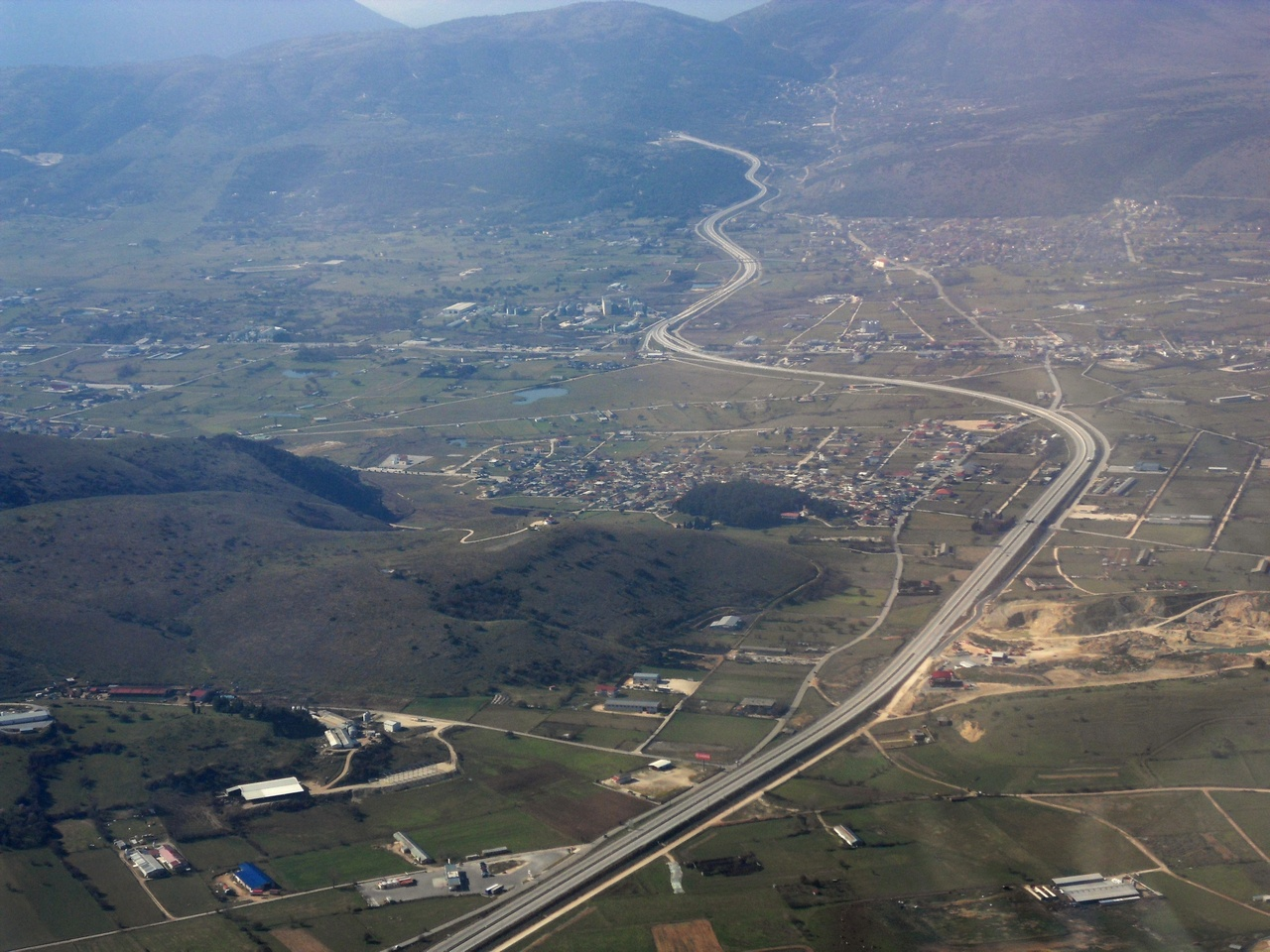
Egnatia Odos near Ioannina, as seen from Airplane.

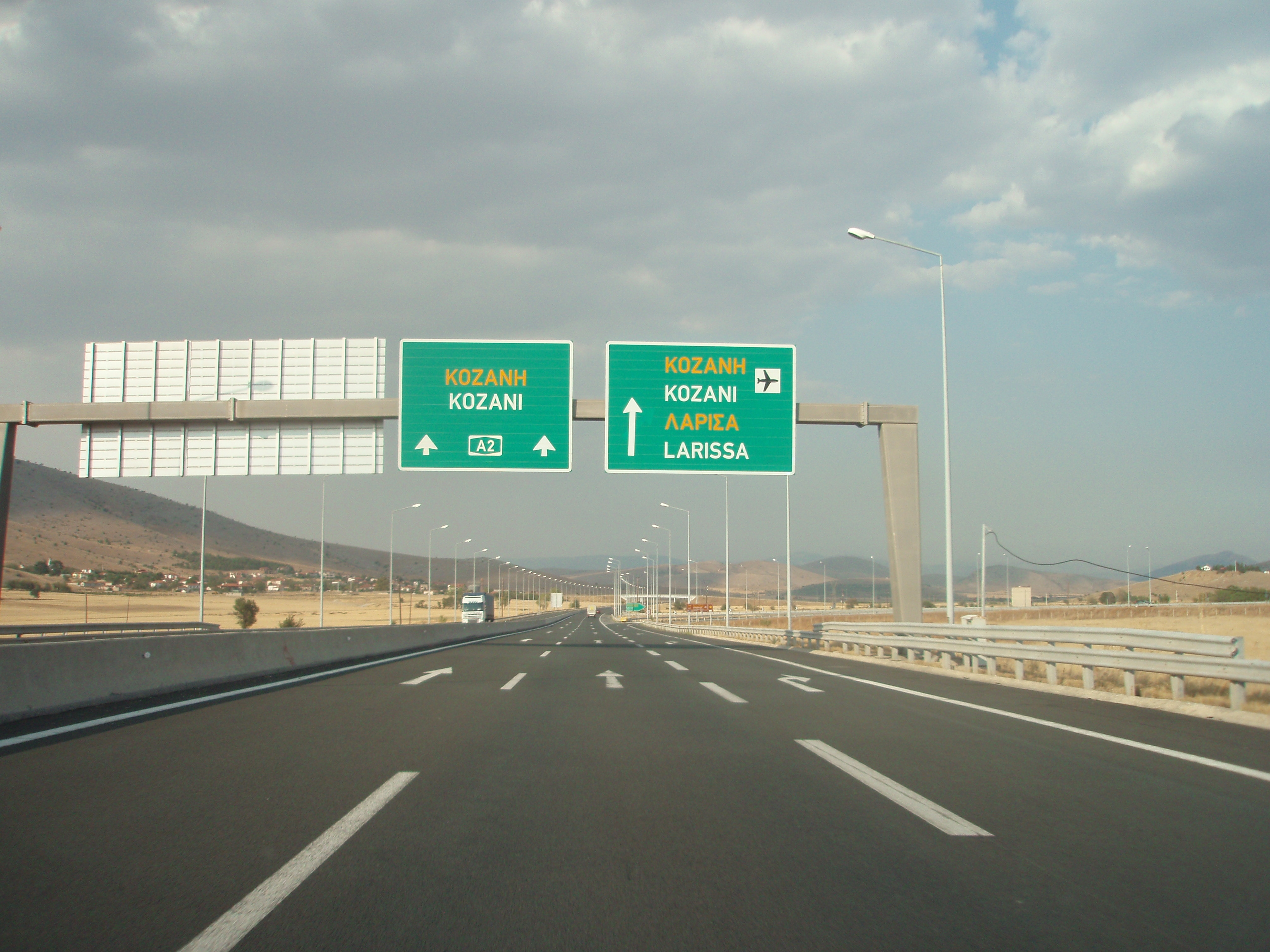
Exit near Kozani

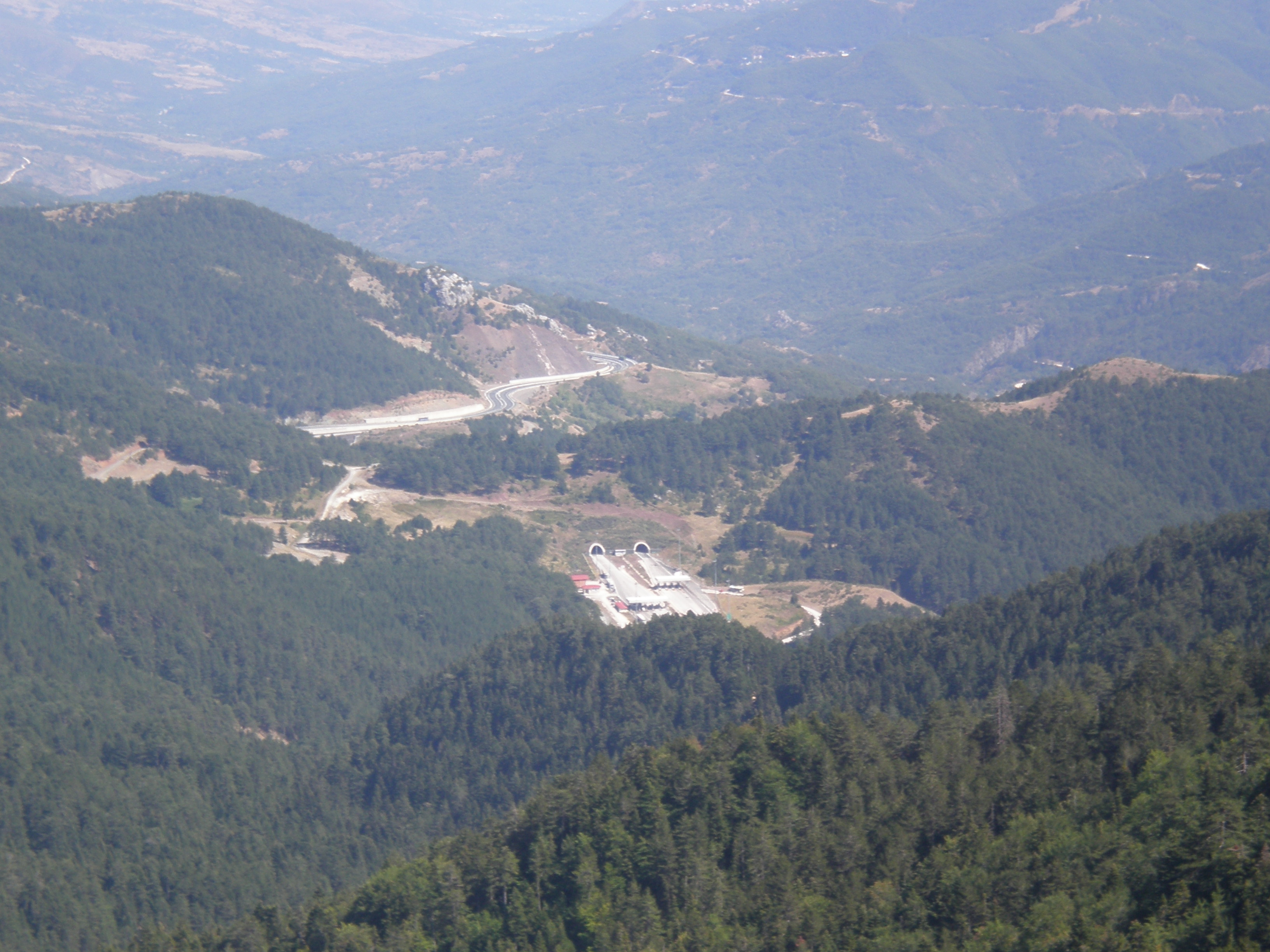
Panoramic view of the tunnel of Malakasi

== Treatment of 7000 high risk sites in Greece with EIB ==
In 2020, EIB and Egnatia Odos are committed to fund treatment of 7000 high risk sites in Greece.
