= Ofrynio =

Ofrynio Οφρύνιο
- Community
- Location within Greece
- Coordinates: 40°47′N 23°54′E
- Country: Greece
- Administrative region: East Macedonia and Thrace
- Regional unit: Kavala
- Municipality: Pangaio
- Municipal unit: Orfano
- Elevation: 100 m (330 ft)

Population (2021)
  - Community: 1,958
- Time zone: UTC+2 (EET)
  - Summer (DST): UTC+3 (EEST)

Ofrynio (Greek: Οφρύνιο) is a village and part of the municipal unit of Orfano in the southwest of the Kavala regional unit, Greece. The community has a population of 1,958 (2021).

With the Kapodistrias program, it joined the Orfano municipality, and formerly belonged to the community of Ofrynio.

== See also ==
- List of settlements in the Kavala regional unit
