= Mesoropi =

Village in northern Greece

Mesoropi Μεσορόπη
- Community
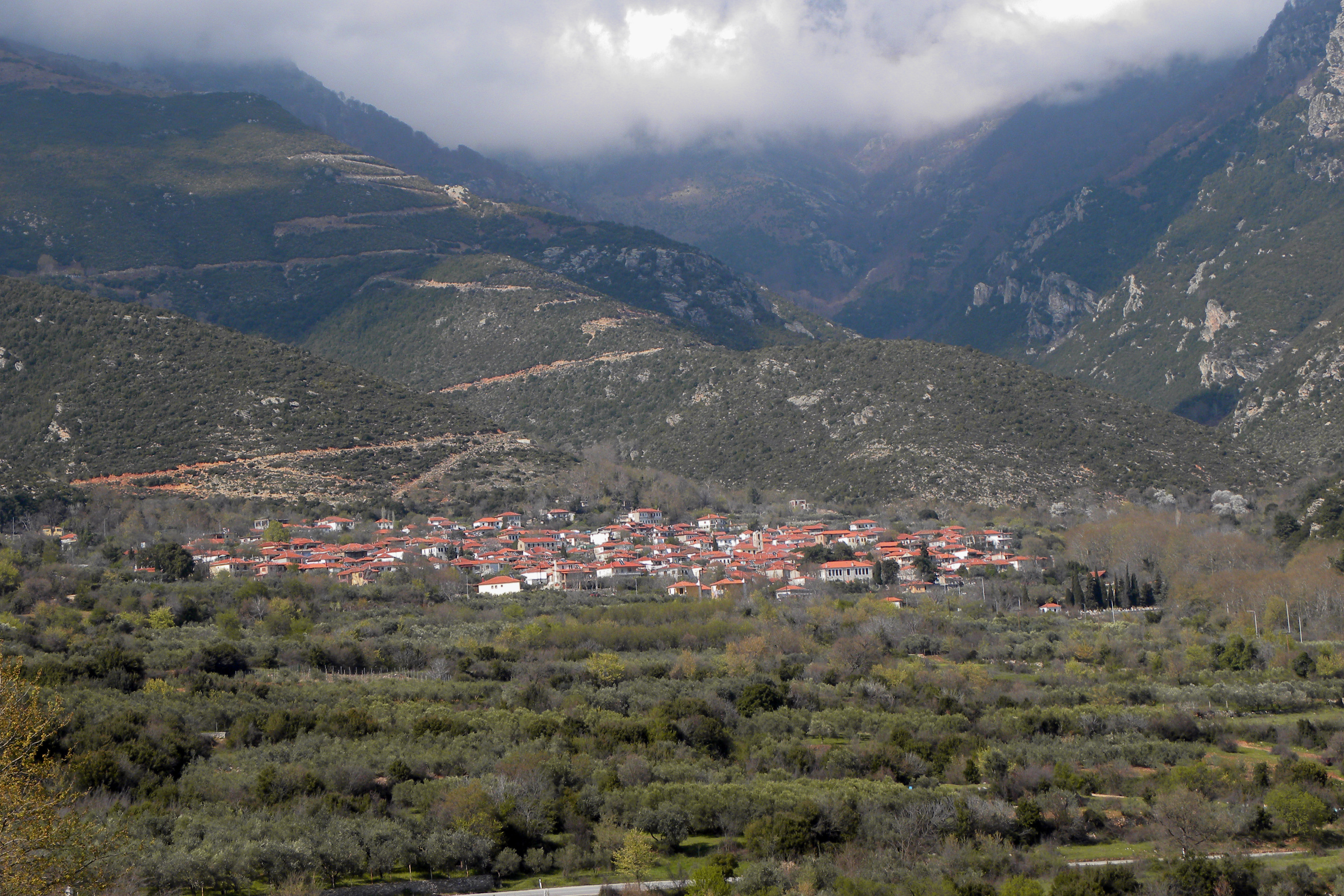

- Location within Greece
- Coordinates: 40°52′N 24°05′E
- Country: Greece
- Administrative region: Eastern Macedonia and Thrace
- Regional unit: Kavala
- Municipality: Pangaio
- Municipal unit: Piereis

Population (2021)
  - Community: 467
- Time zone: UTC+2 (EET)
  - Summer (DST): UTC+3 (EEST)

Mesoropi (Greek: Μεσορόπη) is a village in the south-eastern part of the regional unit of Kavala in northern Greece.

== Geography ==
The village belongs to the municipality of Pangaio and the municipal unit of Piereis. It is situated 350 meters above sea level at 35 km west of the town of Kavala. The River Nidrios passes through the village.
