= Orino =

Orino may refer to:

- Orino, Lombardy, comune of Varese, Lombardy, Italy
- Orino, Kavala, a former village in Greece
- Orino (river), Ticino, Switzerland
- Oreino, Lasithi, a village in Crete, Greece
- Orino, Japan, a city in Japan
