= Rincaleus =

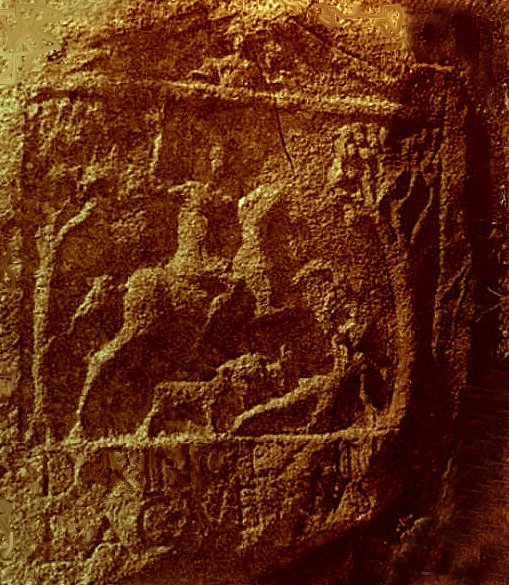
Dominus Rincaleus

Rincaleus is a Thracian god, known from a few epigraphic inscriptions found near Krinides, Philippi, Greece. He is identified as a "Great God" in the pantheon of the Sapei, and is presented as a horseman. The dedications were made by Roman citizens. The theonym is written in Latin. Probably Rincaleus is local deity and was syncretized with Apollo.

The Latin text of the shown inscription:

D(omino) Rinc(aleo) ex ip[erio] L(ucius) Ac(cius) Venustus

== Etymology ==
Linguist Vladimir I. Georgiev compared the name Rincaleus to Greek word ριμφαλέος ("rhimphaléos"), meaning 'quick'. Ivan Duridanov also interpreted the name as 'quick, swift', originating from a Proto-Indo-European stem *wrṇgh or *u̯rṇgh. Georgiev assumed the name was the epithet of the Thracian rider god.

== Bibliography ==
- Collart, Paul; Ducrey, Pierre (1975). "Catalogue". Bulletin de correspondance hellénique (in French) (Suppl. 2): 27–196. doi:10.3406/bch.1975.5084.
