= Podochori =

Podochori Ποδοχώρι, Ποδογόριανη
- Community
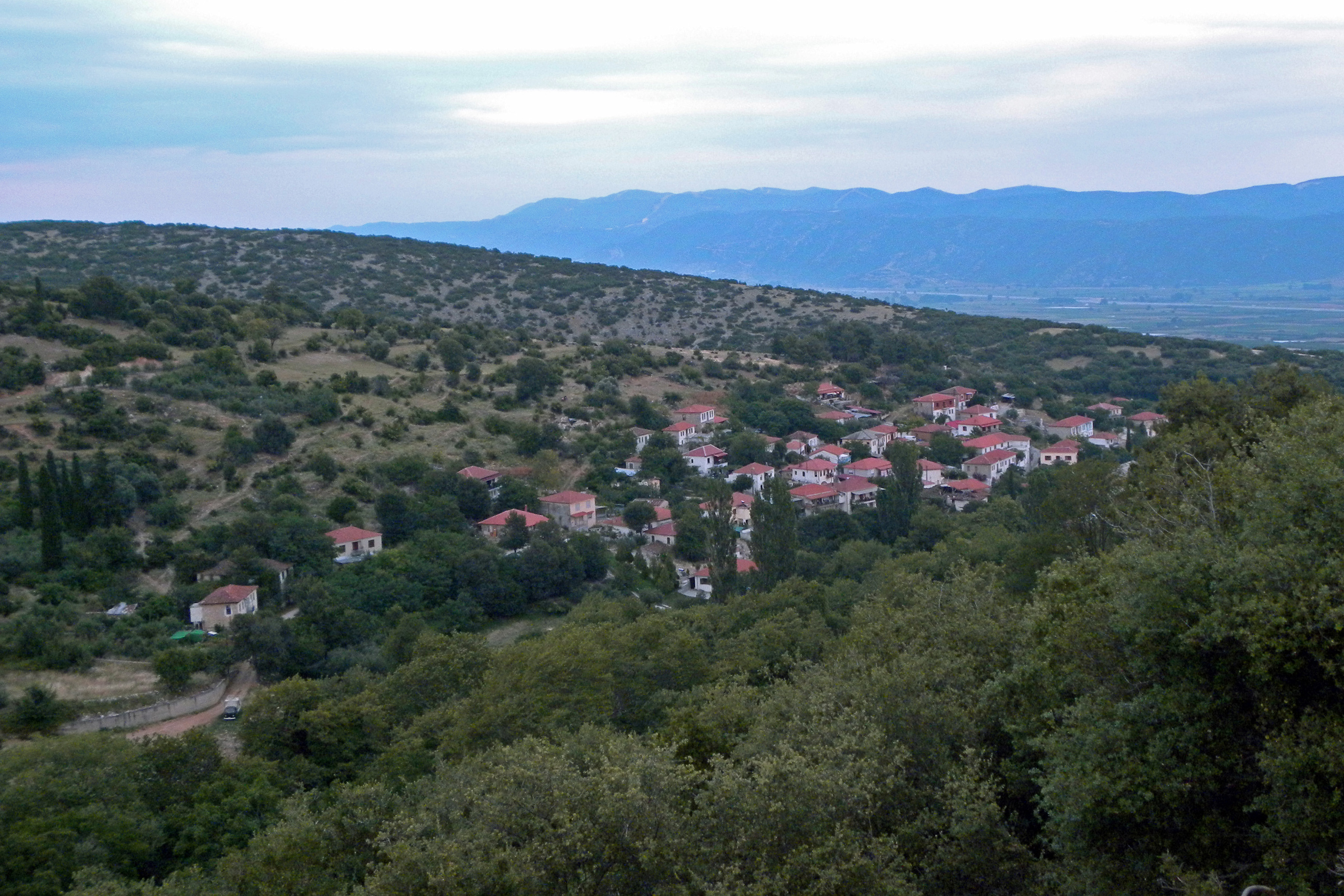
- Panorama of the village

- Location within Greece
- Coordinates: 40°49′52″N 24°01′29″E
- Country: Greece
- Administrative region: East Macedonia and Thrace
- Regional unit: Kavala
- Municipality: Pangaio
- Municipal unit: Orfano
- Elevation: 290 m (950 ft)

Population (2021)
  - Community: 790
- Time zone: UTC+2 (EET)
  - Summer (DST): UTC+3 (EEST)

Podochori (Greek: Ποδοχώρι) is a village in the region of Kavala, northern Greece. According to the 2021 Greek census, the village had 790 inhabitants.

== History & Demographics ==
Southeast of the village there is a settlement of prehistoric and early historical times with visible surface relics. Within the village, next to the church, ceramics of Hellenistic era has been found. On the road to the village Akropotamos, ruins of a triple Early Christian Basilica have been found.

The settlement is recorded as village and as "Podogoryani" in the Ottoman Tahrir Defter number 167 dating to 1530 and written within the kaza of Drama.

According to the statistics of the Bulgarian geographer Vasil Kanchov, the village had a total population of 650 residents in 1900, consisting of 450 Greek Christians and 200 Turks. After the Population exchange between Greece and Turkey and the migration of the Muslim residents of the village to Turkey, in return, 390 Greek Christians from Asia Minor settled in the village. The village got renamed in 1926 to Podochori from Podogoriani.

== 2015 Fires ==
A fire started near the village on 8 August 2015 in rough terrain with low vegetation, which because of the strong wind expanded quickly, threatening houses of the settlement. It got under control and extinguished after an all-night fight of 11 fire trucks and more than 50 firefighters of the Hellenic Fire Service. A small fire started in the forest near the settlement on 26 August 2016, which came under control and got extinguished after the intervention of 3 fire trucks, 7 firefighters and 2 M-18 Dromaders of the Hellenic Fire Service.

== Sights ==
- On the bank of the stream of Kriorema there is an Ottoman bath. The bathroom, measuring 6.60 by 4.50 meters, consists of two rooms, a rectangular hallway and the main square room, which is housed in a brick dome. The monument probably dates back to the 17th century and was part of a larger building complex.
- Located 100 meters from the road to village Podochori-Akropotamos, the ruins of a three-aisled early Christian basilica with painted walls and a wall-mosaic decoration are located. The basilica was timbered and the Narthex, the exarthex, the baptistery and the mosaics are preserved.
