= Nestos Nature Museum =

Defunct museum in Chrysoupoli, Greece

Coordinates: 41.0924°N 24.7587°E

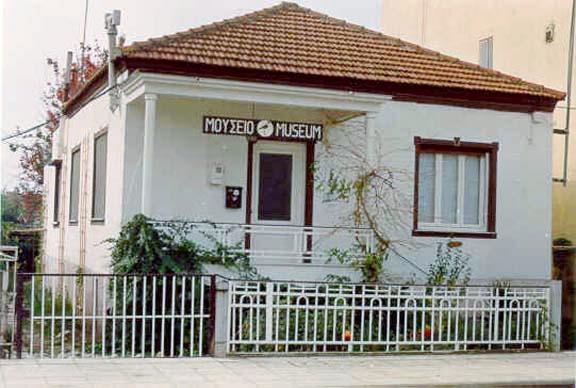
View from outside

The Nestos Nature Museum was located in the town of Chrysoupoli in the Kavala regional unit in Eastern Macedonia, Greece. The museum was founded in 1990 by the Association for the Protection of Nature and Ecodevelopment with the aim of informing local people and visitors about the protection of nature and making them more aware of alternative development. Its three rooms describe the basic characteristics of deltoidal wetlands and the main problems and threats facing them.

In the first room there was a large map and a relief model designed to give a detailed picture of the natural environment of the Nestos delta. The next room presents the ecosystem of the riparian forest and its characteristic flora and fauna, and describes the dangers which threaten the ecosystem.

The third room is devoted to water and displays panels, photographs, texts, and diagrams, which give information about the fauna, the flora, and the problems of coastal habitats. Some of the panels describe and depict the impact of human intervention in the habitats, while others remind visitors of traditional uses of the area and local occupations.

The museum has a garden with seven typical habitats containing more than 200 species of plants, including rosemary, pomegranate, ivy, hop, periwinkle, wild vine, willow, and blackberry, and the most typical species of trees found in the riparian forest. There is also a pond, which represents the freshwater lakes to the north of Hryssoupoli with typical plants and animals from that habitat.

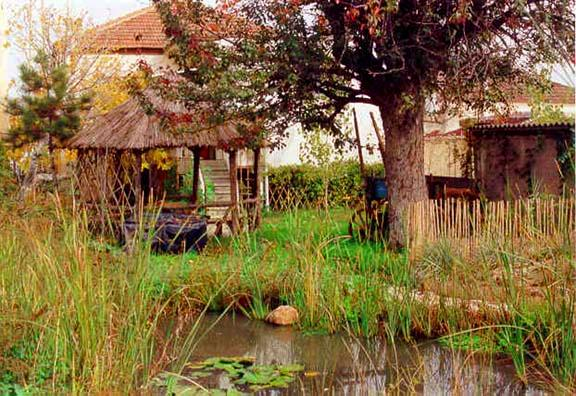
A pond which represents the freshwater lakes

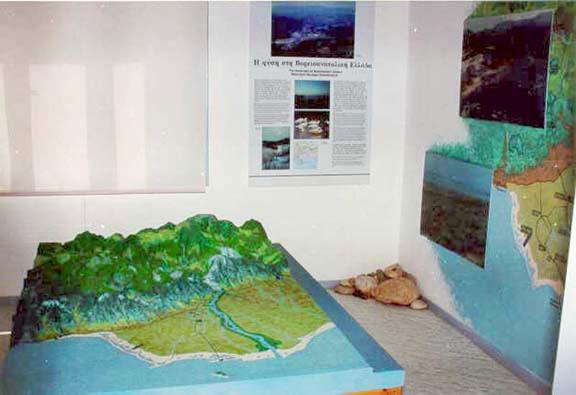
A relief model of the Nestos delta

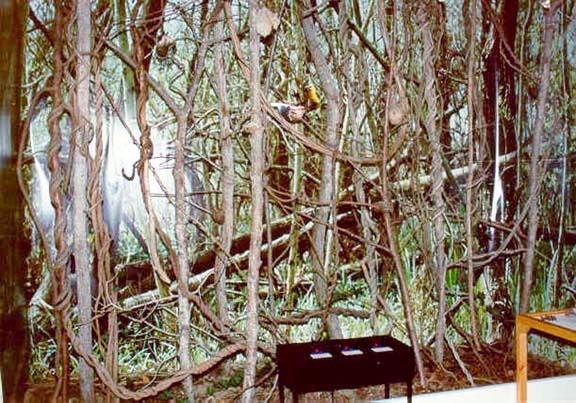
The natural environment of the Nestos delta
