= Drias =

Greek village

Coordinates: 40°57′N 24°11′E

Drias, also referred to as Dryas (Greek: Δρυάς), is a village in Kavala, Greece. The village takes its name after the mythological Greek nymphs Dryads (Greek: Δρυάδες).

Locations near Drias include the small villages of Paleochori (Kavala), and Antifilippi.
