= Zarkadia =

Village in Greece

Zarkadia Ζαρκαδιά
- Community
- Location within Greece
- Coordinates: 41°1′N 24°38′E
- Country: Greece
- Administrative region: East Macedonia and Thrace
- Regional unit: Kavala
- Municipality: Nestos
- Municipal unit: Chrysoupoli

Population (2021)
  - Community: 596
- Time zone: UTC+2 (EET)
  - Summer (DST): UTC+3 (EEST)

Zarkadia (Greek: Ζαρκαδιά) is a village and a community in the municipal unit of Chrysoupoli in the Kavala regional unit, Greece. The community consists of the villages Zarkadia and Ekali. The community had a population of 596 during the 2021 census.
