= Oreino =

Oreino Ορεινό
- Municipal unit
- Location within the regional unit

- Location within Greece
- Coordinates: 41°09′N 24°33′E
- Country: Greece
- Administrative region: East Macedonia and Thrace
- Regional unit: Kavala
- Municipality: Nestos

Area
  - Municipal unit: 318.6 km^{2} (123.0 sq mi)

Population (2021)
  - Municipal unit: 960
  - Municipal unit density: 3.0/km^{2} (7.8/sq mi)
- Time zone: UTC+2 (EET)
  - Summer (DST): UTC+3 (EEST)
- Vehicle registration: ΚΒ

Oreino (Greek: Ορεινό) is a former municipality in the Kavala regional unit, East Macedonia and Thrace, Greece. Since the 2011 local government reform it is part of the municipality Nestos, of which it is a municipal unit. The municipal unit has an area of 318.555 km^{2}. Population 960 (2021). The seat of the municipality was in Lekani.
