= Greek National Road 59 =

Trunk road in Greece

Coordinates: 40.8946°N 23.8657°E

National Road 59
- Εθνική Οδός 59
- Route of the EO59 road, in blue

Route information
- Length: 27.7 km (17.2 mi)
- Existed: 9 July 1963–present

Major junctions
- North end: Mesorrachi
- South end: Amphipolis

Location
- Country: Greece
- Regions: Central Macedonia
- Primary destinations: Mesorrachi; Amphipolis

Highway system
- Highways in Greece; Motorways; National roads
← EO58	→ EO60

National Road 59 (Greek: Εθνική Οδός 59), abbreviated as the EO59, is a national road in north eastern Greece. The EO59 runs within Central Macedonia, connecting Serres with the A2 motorway and the EO2 in Amphipolis.

== Route ==
The EO59 is officially defined as a north–south route within the Serres regional unit: it branches off the EO12 at Mesorrachi, and heads south to Amphipolis and the junction with the A2 motorway and the EO2.

== History ==
Ministerial Decision G25871 of 9 July 1963 created the EO59 from the old EO44, which existed by royal decree from 1955 until 1963, and followed the same route as the current EO59. In 1995, the EO59 was subclassified as part of the secondary national network.
