= Nea Karvali =

Village in Eastern Macedonia, Greece

Nea Karvali Νέα Καρβάλη
- Community
- Location within Greece
- Coordinates: 40°57.6′N 24°30.6′E
- Country: Greece
- Administrative region: East Macedonia and Thrace
- Regional unit: Kavala
- Municipality: Kavala
- Municipal unit: Kavala

Area
  - Community: 46.297 km^{2} (17.875 sq mi)
- Elevation: 6 m (20 ft)

Population (2021)
  - Community: 2,003
  - Density: 43.26/km^{2} (112.1/sq mi)
- Time zone: UTC+2 (EET)
  - Summer (DST): UTC+3 (EEST)
- Postal code: 640 06
- Area code: +30-251
- Vehicle registration: KB

Nea Karvali (Greek: Νέα Καρβάλη) is a resort village and a community of the Kavala municipality in northern Greece.

Most of the inhabitants are descendants of Cappadocian Greeks who arrived from Karvali (today Güzelyurt, Turkey) following the Greek-Turkish population exchange in 1924.

Before the 2011 local government reform it was part of the municipality of Kavala, of which it was a municipal district. The 2021 census recorded 2,003 inhabitants in the community. The community of Nea Karvali covers an area of 46.297 km^{2}.

The town is a popular small tourist destination with many people owning second homes, especially domestic tourists from Greece.

== Administrative division ==
The community of Nea Karvali consists of three separate settlements:

- Ano Lefki (population 21)
- Lefki (population 57)
- Nea Karvali (population 1,925)

The aforementioned population figures are as of 2021.

== See also ==
- List of settlements in the Kavala regional unit
