= Oreino, Kavala =

Coordinates: 41°02′N 24°29′E

Oreino (Greek: Ορεινό; local Slavic: Јурен Дере, Орен Дере; Turkish: Juren Dere, Oren Dere) is a former village, now in ruins, in Kavala regional unit, Greece. During the population exchange between Greece and Turkey in the early 1920s, the population, primarily Turks with some Slavs, left, and the village was not repopulated. There is a large stone wall that still exists after a war that occurred around the year 1500.
