= Krinides =

Krinides Κρηνίδες
- Community
- Location within Greece
- Coordinates: 41°1′N 24°18′E
- Country: Greece
- Administrative region: East Macedonia and Thrace
- Regional unit: Kavala
- Municipality: Kavala
- Municipal unit: Filippoi

Population (2021)
  - Community: 2,925
- Time zone: UTC+2 (EET)
  - Summer (DST): UTC+3 (EEST)
- Vehicle registration: ΚΒ

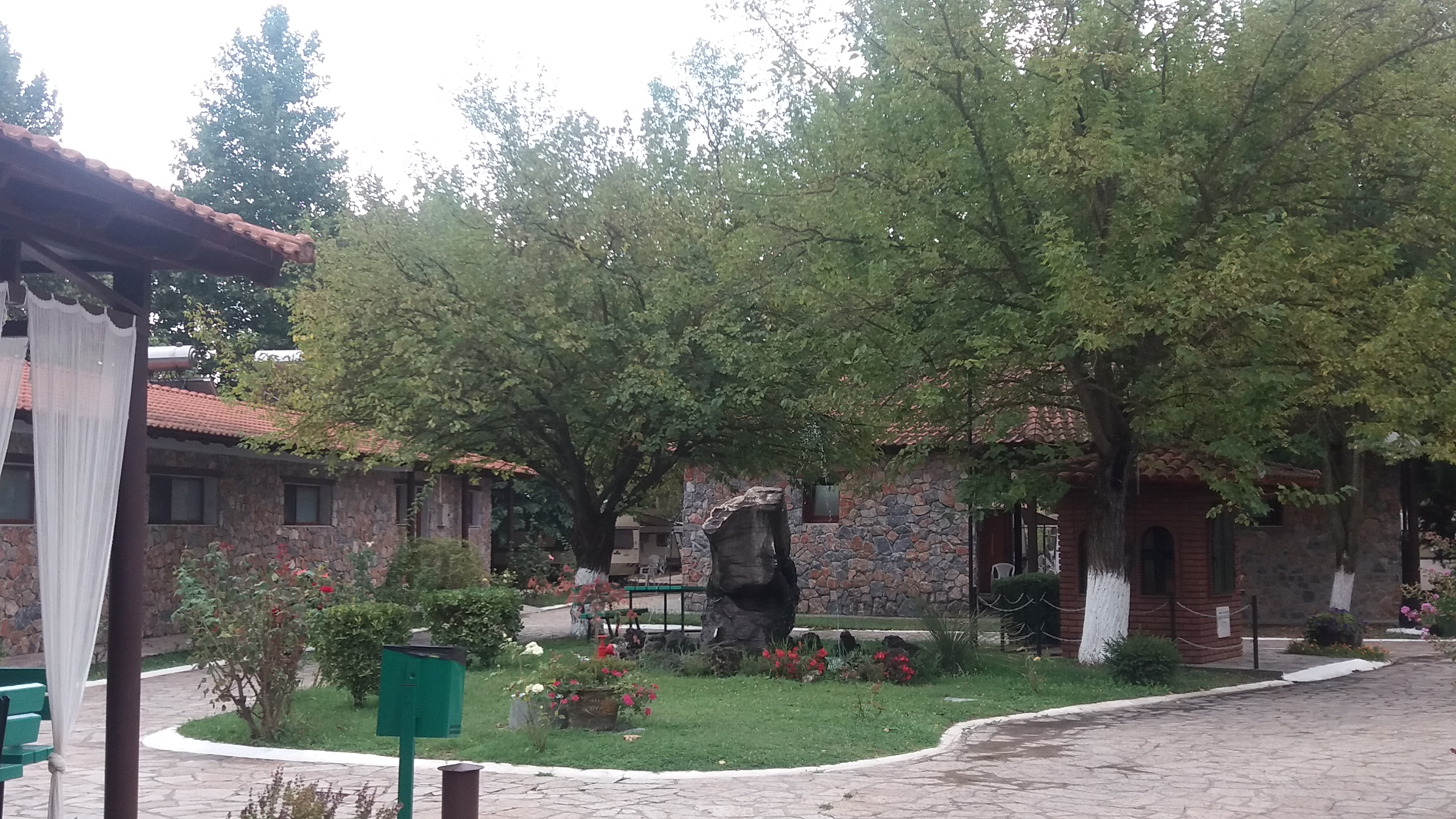
The premises of the mud baths of Krinides

Krinides (Greek: Κρηνίδες, before 1926: Ράχτσα - Rachtsa) is a town in the Kavala regional unit in eastern Macedonia, Greece. It was the seat of the former municipality of Filippoi. The ruins of the ancient city Philippi are close to the town. Krinides is situated at the southwestern foot of the Lekanis hills, 13 km northwest of Kavala and 20 km southeast of Drama. The Greek National Road 12 between Drama and Kavala passes west of Krinides.

== History ==
Krinides was named after the ancient town Crenides. Formerly a possession of the island of Thasos, Crenides was captured by King Philip II of Macedon in 356 BC, who expanded and fortified the city and renamed it Philippi after himself.

== Historical population ==
Year	Population
1981	2,811
1991	3,005
2001	3,295
2011	3,365
2021	2,925
