= Nestos (municipality) =

Nestos Νέστος
- Municipality

- Location within Greece
- Coordinates: 40°59′N 24°42′E
- Country: Greece
- Administrative region: East Macedonia and Thrace
- Regional unit: Kavala
- Seat: Chrysoupoli

Area
  - Municipality: 678.8 km^{2} (262.1 sq mi)

Population (2021)
  - Municipality: 20,311
  - Density: 29.92/km^{2} (77.50/sq mi)
- Time zone: UTC+2 (EET)
  - Summer (DST): UTC+3 (EEST)

Nestos (Greek: Νέστος) is a municipality in the Kavala regional unit, East Macedonia and Thrace, Greece. The seat of the municipality is the town Chrysoupoli. The municipality has an area of 678.831 km^{2}. It was named after the river Nestos.

== Municipality ==
The municipality Nestos was formed at the 2011 local government reform by the merger of the following 3 former municipalities, that became municipal units:

- Chrysoupoli
- Keramoti
- Oreino

== Province ==
The province of Nestos (Greek: Επαρχία Νέστου) was one of the provinces of the Kavala Prefecture. It had the same territory as the present municipality. It was abolished in 2006.
