= Kavala Prefecture =

Kavala Prefecture Νομός Καβάλας
- Former prefecture
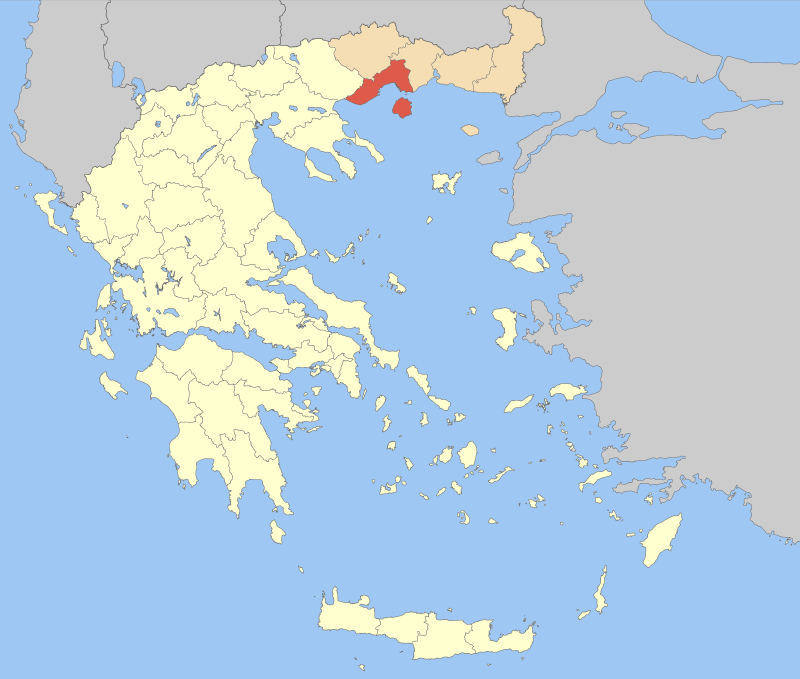
- Location of Kavala Prefecture in Greece
- Country: Greece
- Periphery: East Macedonia and Thrace
- Established: 1915
- Disestablished: 2011
- Capital: Kavala
  - Rank: List of the prefectures of Greece by area
  - Rank: List of the prefectures of Greece by population

Kavala Prefecture (Greek: Νομός Καβάλας) was one of the prefectures of Greece. Its capital was Kavala. It was established in 1915, soon after its territory was incorporated into Greece in the Balkan Wars. The prefecture was disbanded on 1 January 2011 by the Kallikratis programme, and split into the regional units of Kavala and Thasos.
