= Piereis =

Piereis Πιερείς
- Municipal unit
- Location within the regional unit

- Location within Greece
- Coordinates: 40°51′N 24°06′E
- Country: Greece
- Administrative region: East Macedonia and Thrace
- Regional unit: Kavala
- Municipality: Pangaio

Area
  - Municipal unit: 143.4 km^{2} (55.4 sq mi)
- Elevation: 190 m (620 ft)

Population (2021)
  - Municipal unit: 3,470
  - Municipal unit density: 24.2/km^{2} (62.7/sq mi)
- Time zone: UTC+2 (EET)
  - Summer (DST): UTC+3 (EEST)
- Vehicle registration: ΚΒ

Piereis (Greek: Πιερείς) is a former municipality in the Kavala regional unit, East Macedonia and Thrace, Greece. Since the 2011 local government reform it is part of the municipality Pangaio, of which it is a municipal unit. The municipal unit has an area of 143.402 km^{2}. Population 3,470 (2021). The seat of the municipality was in Moustheni.
