= Eleftheroupoli =

Town in Eastern Macedonia, Greece

Eleftheroupoli Ελευθερούπολη
- Municipal unit
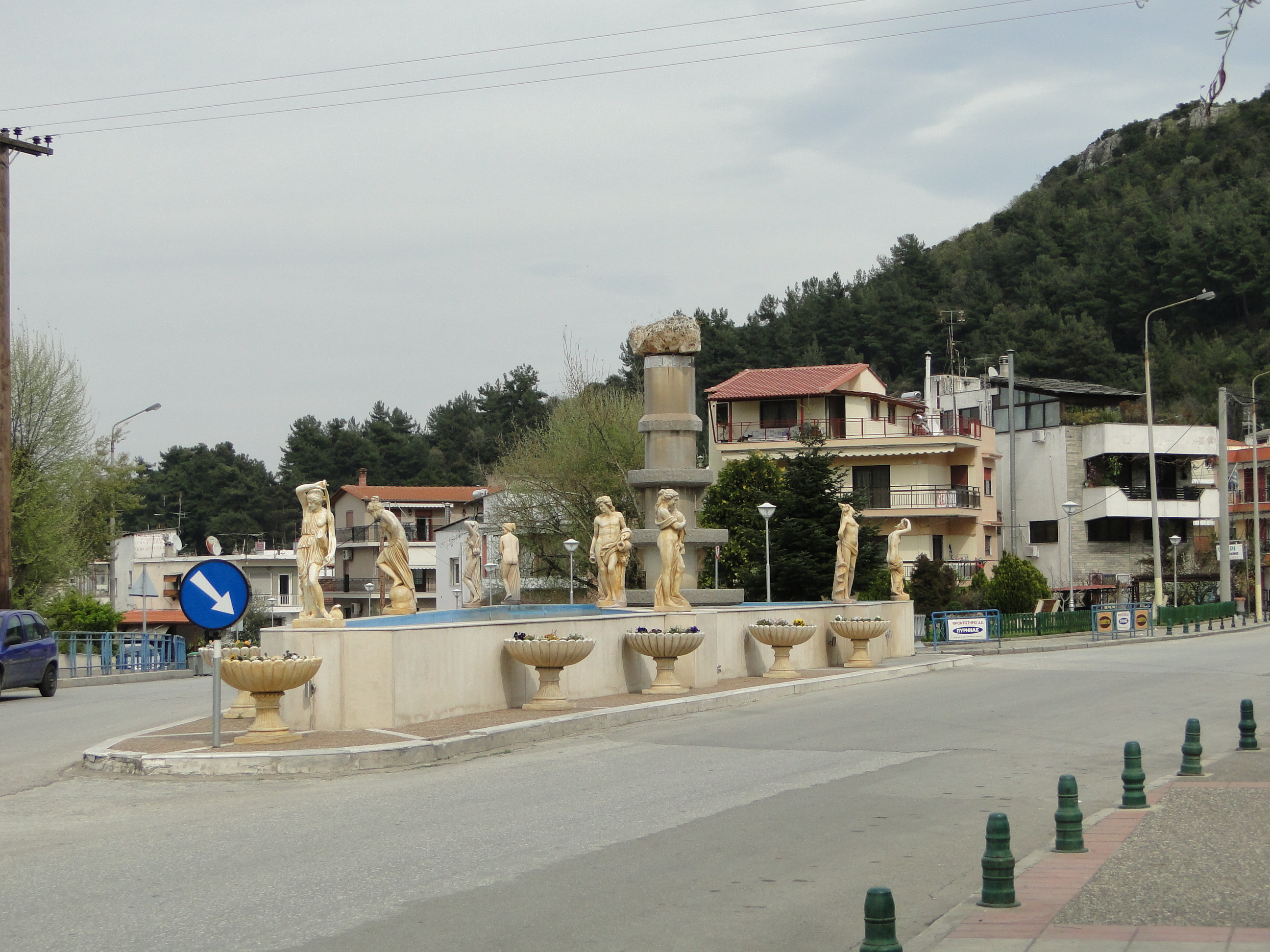
- Central square and fountain

- Location within the regional unit

- Location within Greece
- Coordinates: 40°55′N 24°15′E
- Country: Greece
- Geographic region: Macedonia
- Administrative region: East Macedonia and Thrace
- Regional unit: Kavala
- Municipality: Pangaio

Area
  - Municipal unit: 127.0 km^{2} (49.0 sq mi)
- Elevation: 86 m (282 ft)

Population (2021)
  - Municipal unit: 8,863
  - Municipal unit density: 69.79/km^{2} (180.7/sq mi)
  - Community: 5,292
- Time zone: UTC+2 (EET)
  - Summer (DST): UTC+3 (EEST)
- Vehicle registration: ΚΒ

Eleftheroupoli (Greek: Ελευθερούπολη, katharevousa: Ελευθερούπολις - Eleftheroupolis, until 1929 Πράβι - Pravi, Bulgarian: Правища; Turkish: Pravişte) is a town and a former municipality in the Kavala regional unit, East Macedonia and Thrace, Greece. Since the 2011 local government reform it is part of the municipality Pangaio, of which it is the seat and a municipal unit. The municipal unit has an area of 126.974 km^{2}. At the 2021 census, the municipal unit's population was 8,863 and the community's population was 5,292.

== Sister cities ==
- Antony, France
