= Filippoi =

Filippoi Φίλιπποι
- Municipal unit
- Location within the regional unit

- Location within Greece
- Coordinates: 41°1′N 24°17′E
- Country: Greece
- Administrative region: East Macedonia and Thrace
- Regional unit: Kavala
- Municipality: Kavala

Area
  - Municipal unit: 238.8 km^{2} (92.2 sq mi)
- Elevation: 78 m (256 ft)

Population (2021)
  - Municipal unit: 10,133
  - Municipal unit density: 42.43/km^{2} (109.9/sq mi)
  - Community: 796
- Time zone: UTC+2 (EET)
  - Summer (DST): UTC+3 (EEST)
- Postal code: 640 03
- Area code: 2510
- Vehicle registration: ΚΒ

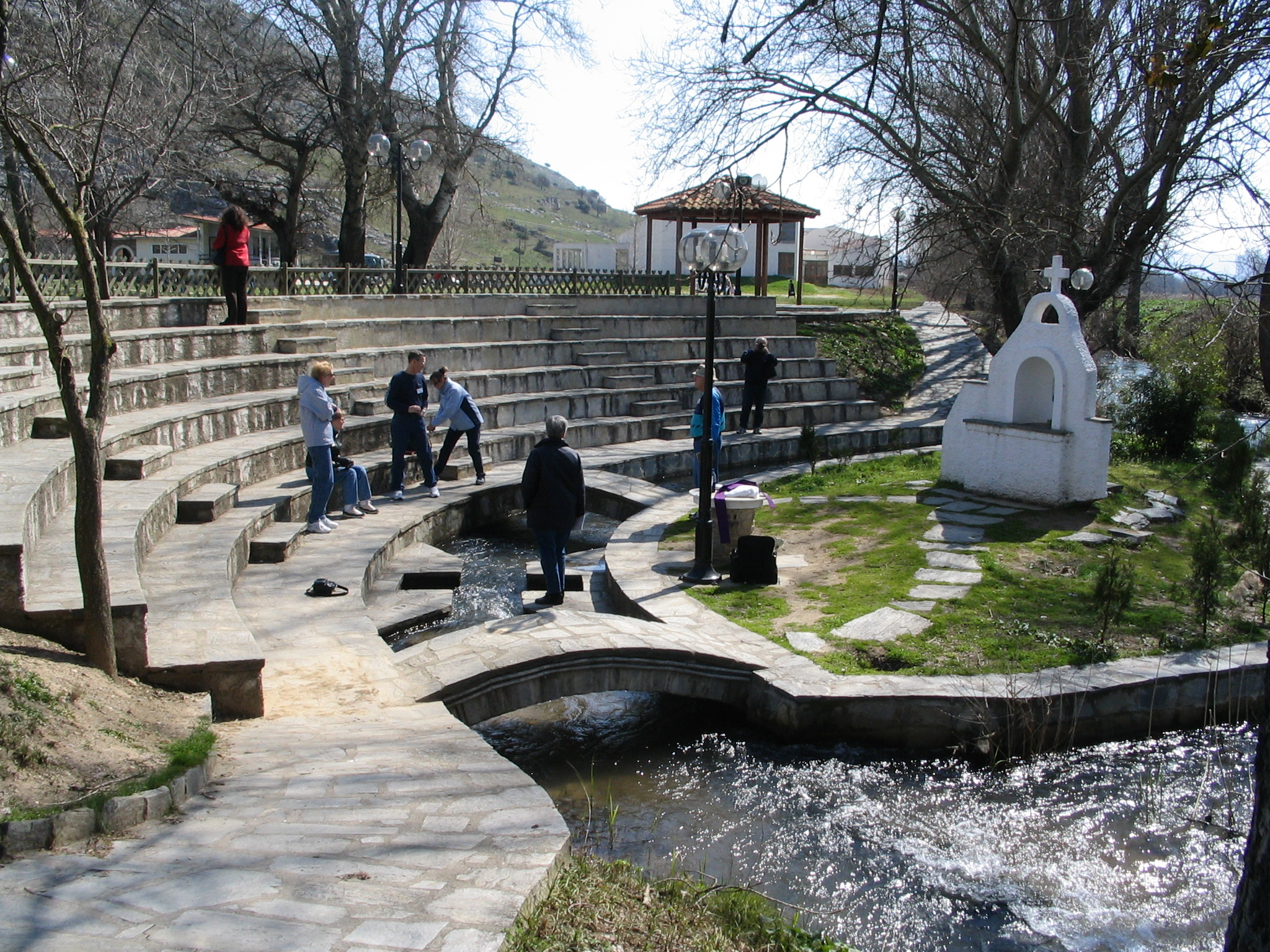
A modern Greek Orthodox outdoor chapel on what is said to be the site where Lydia was baptized.

Filippoi (Greek: Φίλιπποι, Philippi), is a village and a former municipality in the Kavala regional unit, East Macedonia and Thrace, Greece built on the Via Egnatia. Since the 2011 local government reform it is part of the municipality Kavala, of which it is a municipal unit. The municipal unit has an area of 238.751 km^{2}. The 2021 census reported a population of 10,133 for the municipal unit and 796 for the village. The ruins of ancient Philippi are located in the municipal unit.

== Cultural Sites ==
The most important cultural event of the town is its annual festival, held since 1957. It takes place in the Ancient Theatre of Philippi during the high season with ancient and modern performances, ballets and concerts by theatrical troupes, orchestras and bands.

This ancient Greek theatre dates to 357 BC, possibly built King Philip II. It was first restored in 1957 by Dimitris Lazaridis with a view of holding the festival.

The town has an Archeological Museum with two floors of exhibition space and houses four major collections from pre-historic to Early Christian.

On the outskirts of the town at the riverside is an outdoor Baptistery, built on the site where it is believed the purple merchant, Lydia of Thyatira, and her household were baptised by the Apostle Paul around 49/50 AD.

== Twin cities ==
- Čačak, Serbia
