= Chrysoupoli =

Town in East Macedonia, Greece

Chrysoupoli Χρυσούπολη
- Municipal unit
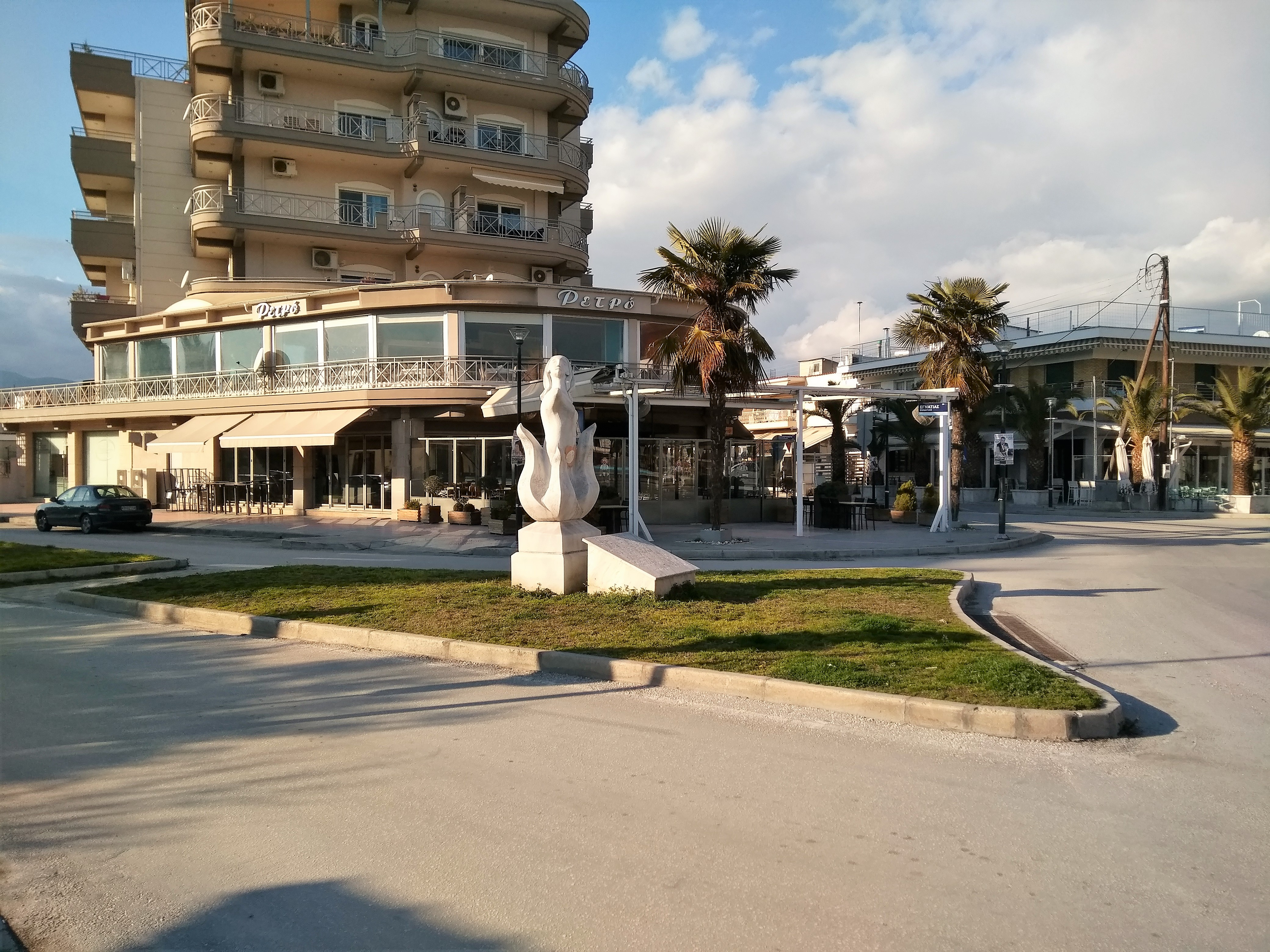
- Chrysoupoli

- Location within the regional unit

- Location within Greece
- Coordinates: 40°59′N 24°42′E
- Country: Greece
- Geographic region: Macedonia
- Administrative region: East Macedonia and Thrace
- Regional unit: Kavala
- Municipality: Nestos

Area
  - Municipal unit: 245.2 km^{2} (94.7 sq mi)
- Elevation: 20 m (66 ft)

Population (2021)
  - Municipal unit: 14,970
  - Municipal unit density: 61.05/km^{2} (158.1/sq mi)
  - Community: 8,824
- Time zone: UTC+2 (EET)
  - Summer (DST): UTC+3 (EEST)
- Postal code: 642 00
- Area code: 25910
- Vehicle registration: ΚΒ

Chrysoupoli (Greek: Χρυσούπολη, before 1925: Σαπαίοι, Sapaioi or Σαρή Σαμπάν, Sari Saban) is a town and a former municipality in the Kavala regional unit as part of East Macedonia and Thrace, Greece. Since the 2011 local government reform it is part of the municipality Nestos, of which it is the seat and a municipal unit. The municipal unit has an area of 245.181 km^{2}. The population of the municipal unit of Chrysoupoli in 2021 was 14,970.

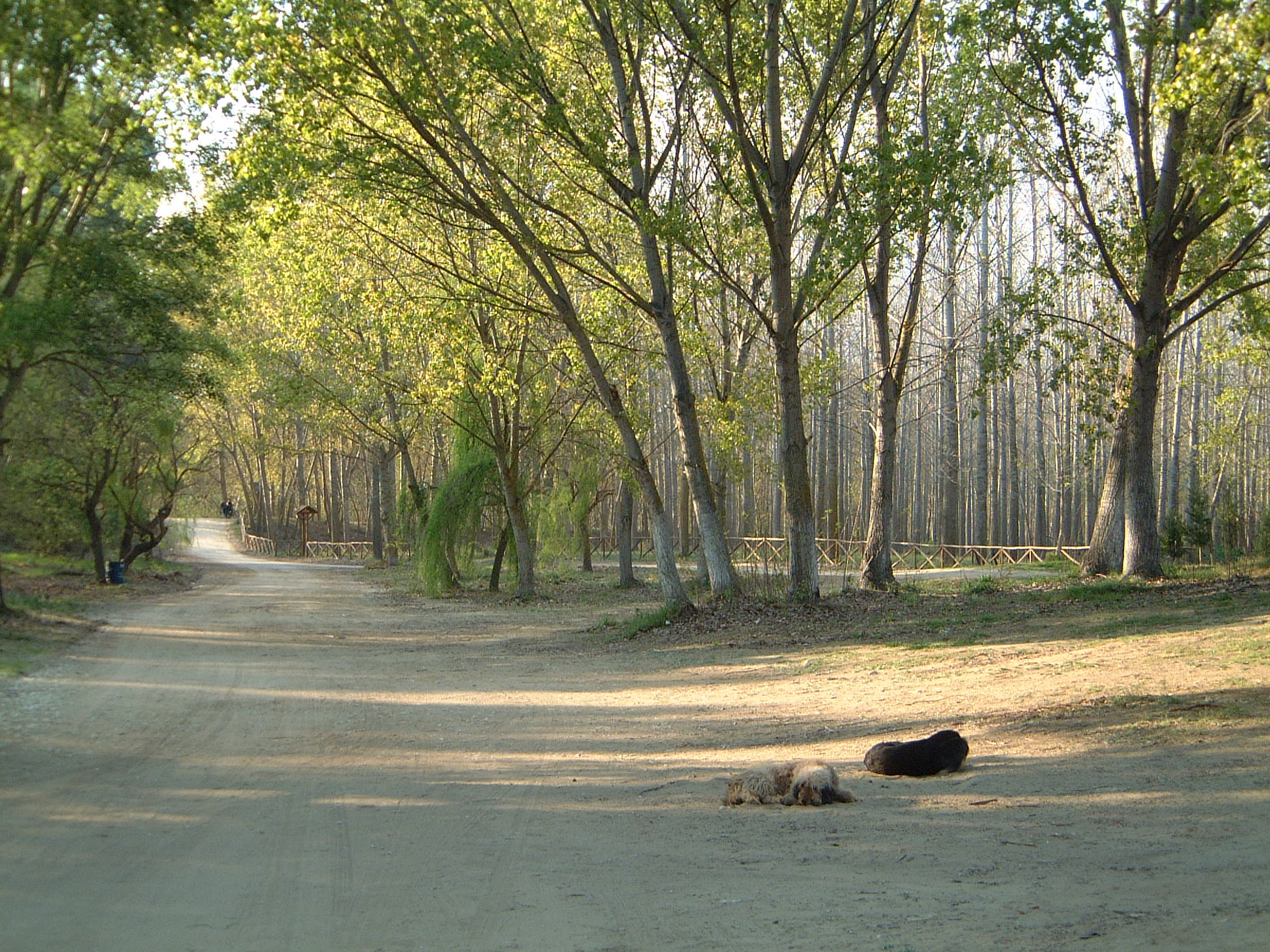
Nestos riverside forest at Chrysoupoli

It was known as "Sarışaban" during Ottoman rule. It was a kaza centre in the Sanjak of Drama, part of the Salonica Vilayet, before the Balkan Wars.

The Nestos Nature Museum was situated in Chrysoupoli, but has closed in 2013. The Nestos Chrysoupoli F.C. football club is based in Chrysoupoli. The Chrysoupoli Club PAOK is also a significant club situated in Chrysoupoli.

== International relations ==
Chrysoupoli is twinned with:

- Jagodina, Serbia
- Zlatograd, Bulgaria
