= Keramoti =

Keramoti Κεραμωτή
- Municipal unit
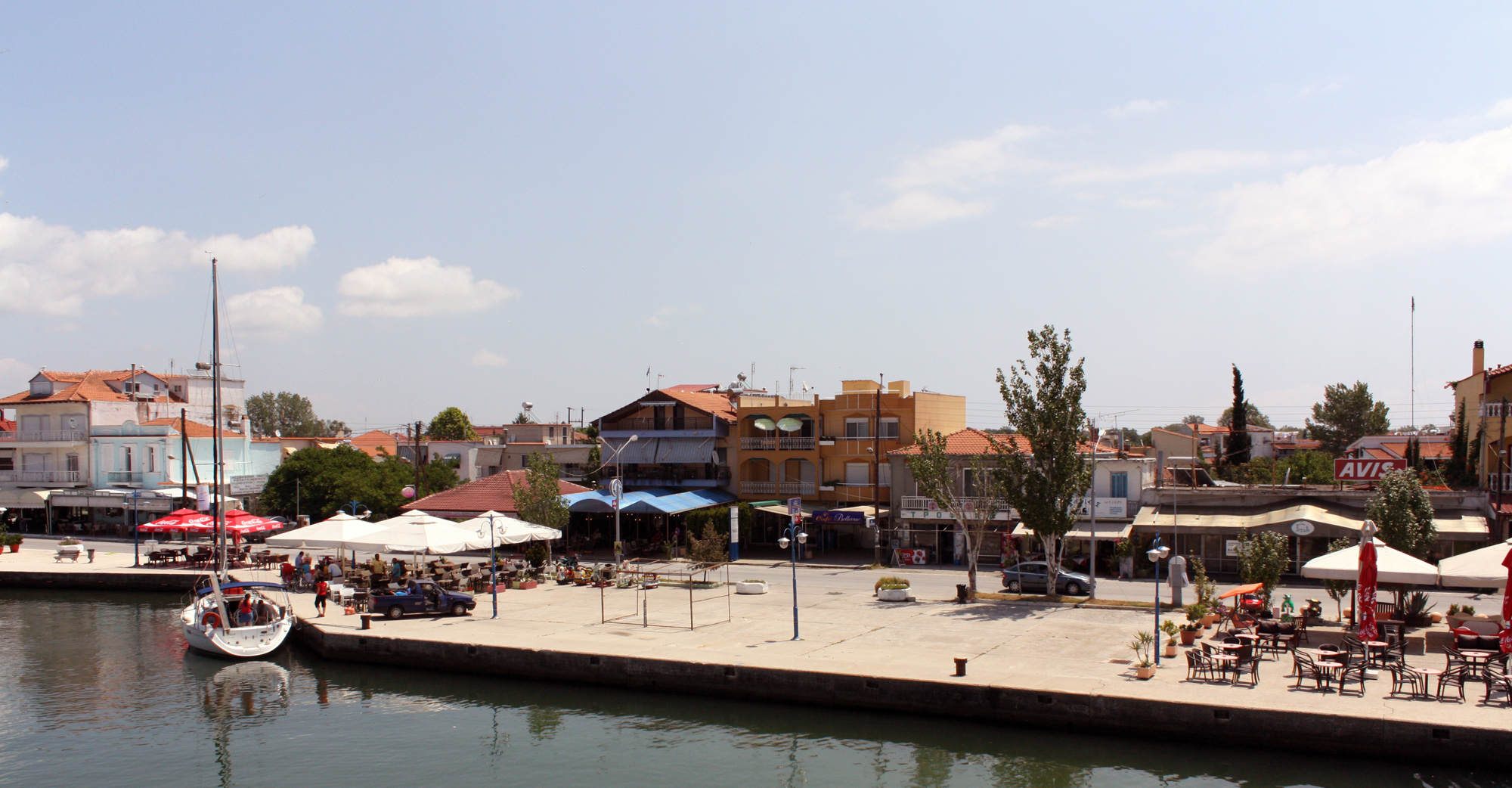
- Quay street in Keramoti

- Location within the regional unit

- Location within Greece
- Coordinates: 40°52′N 24°42′E
- Country: Greece
- Administrative region: East Macedonia and Thrace
- Regional unit: Kavala
- Municipality: Nestos

Area
  - Municipal unit: 115.1 km^{2} (44.4 sq mi)

Population (2021)
  - Municipal unit: 4,381
  - Municipal unit density: 38.06/km^{2} (98.58/sq mi)
  - Community: 1,715
- Time zone: UTC+2 (EET)
  - Summer (DST): UTC+3 (EEST)
- Vehicle registration: ΚΒ

Keramoti (Greek: Κεραμωτή) is a town and a former municipality in the Kavala regional unit, East Macedonia and Thrace, Greece. Since the 2011 local government reform it is part of the municipality Nestos, of which it is a municipal unit. The municipal unit has an area of 115.095 km^{2}. As of the 2021 census, the municipal unit had a population of 4,381, and the community had a population of 1,715. Originated as a small fisherman's village of Greek immigrants from Asia Minor, today Keramoti is a picturesque little sea resort with a sandy beach, several small hotels and a lot of vacation rentals.

== Gallery ==
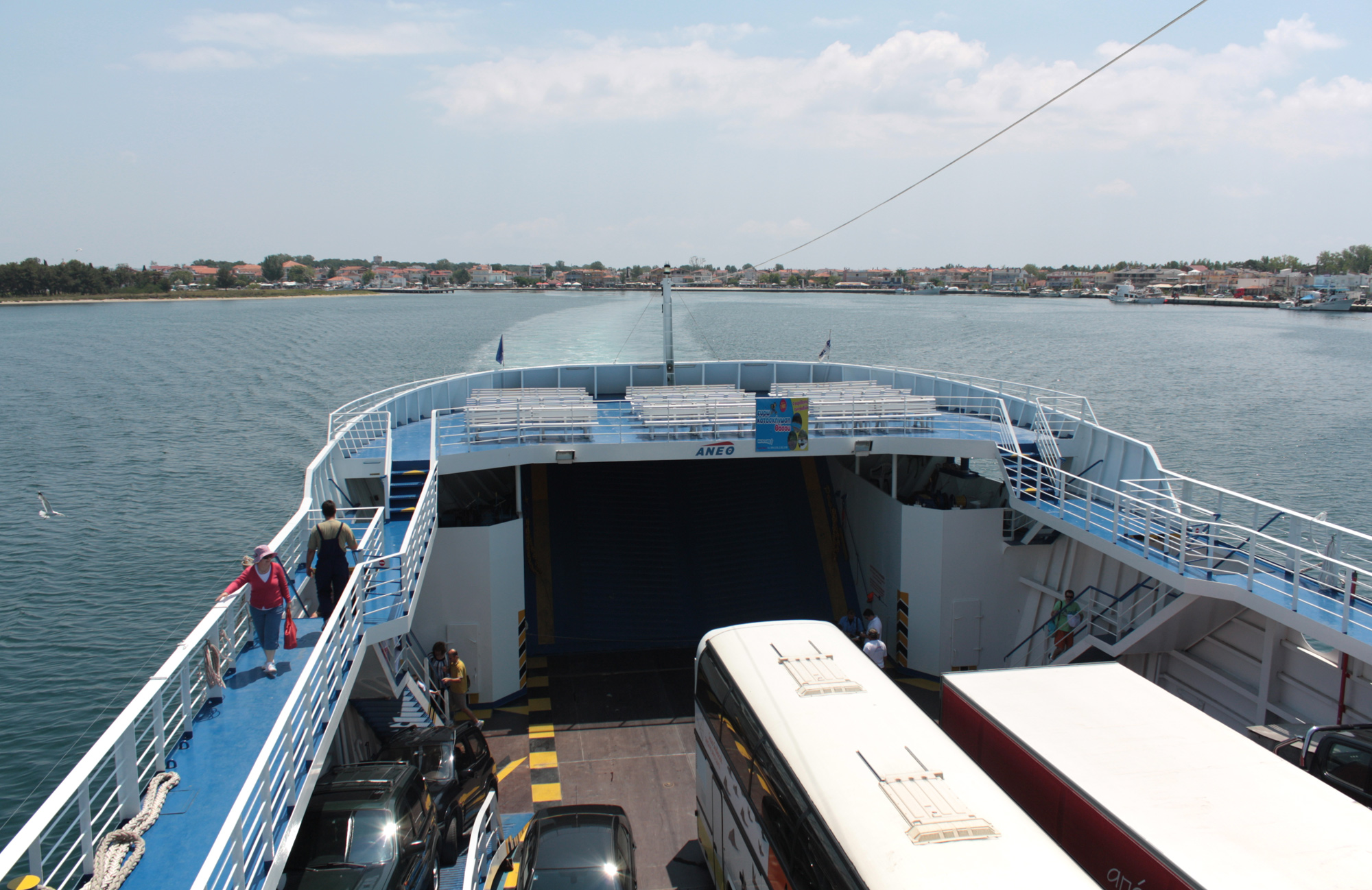
View on Keramoti on board the ferry to Thassos

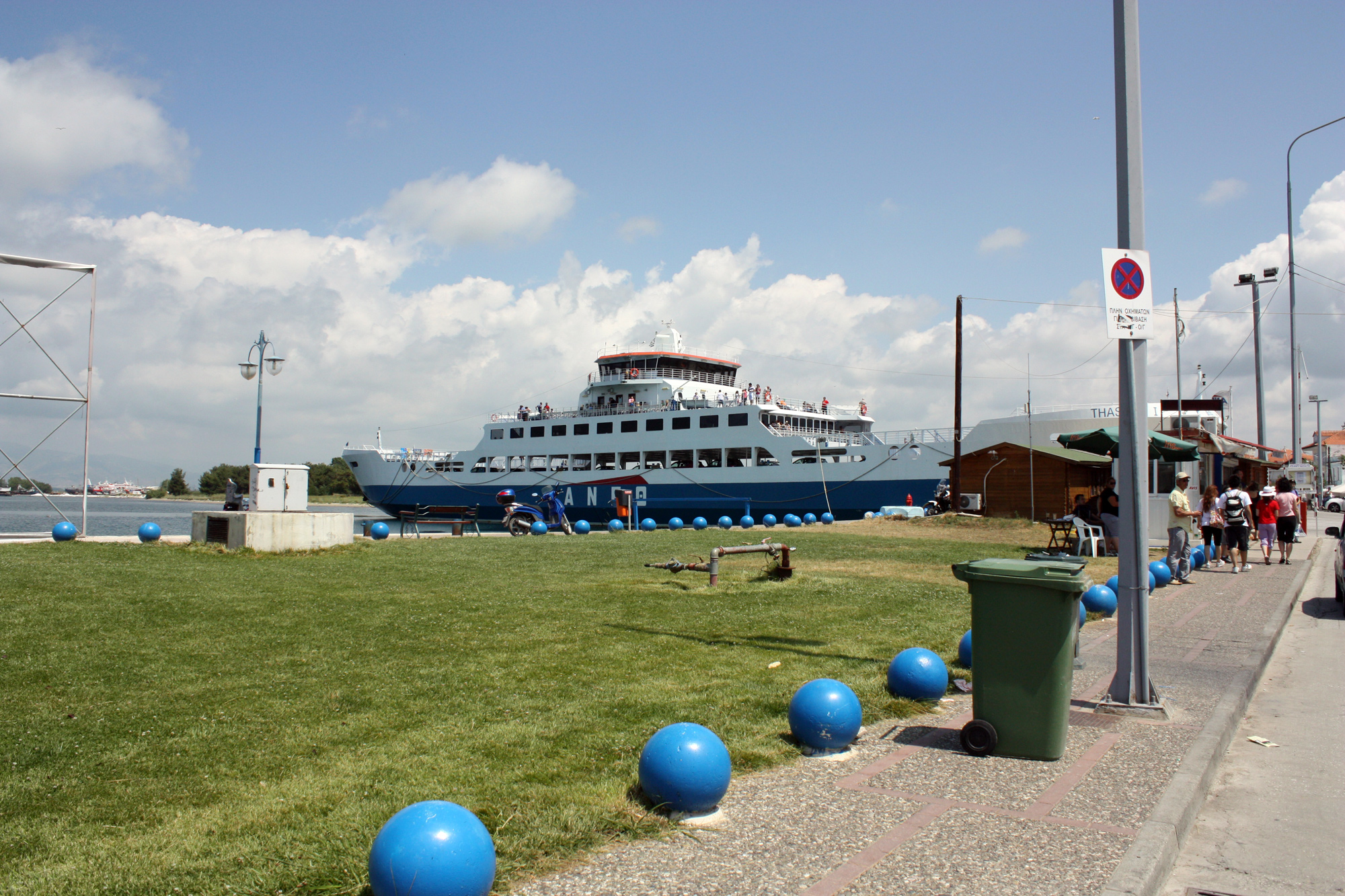
Keramoti Ferry pier

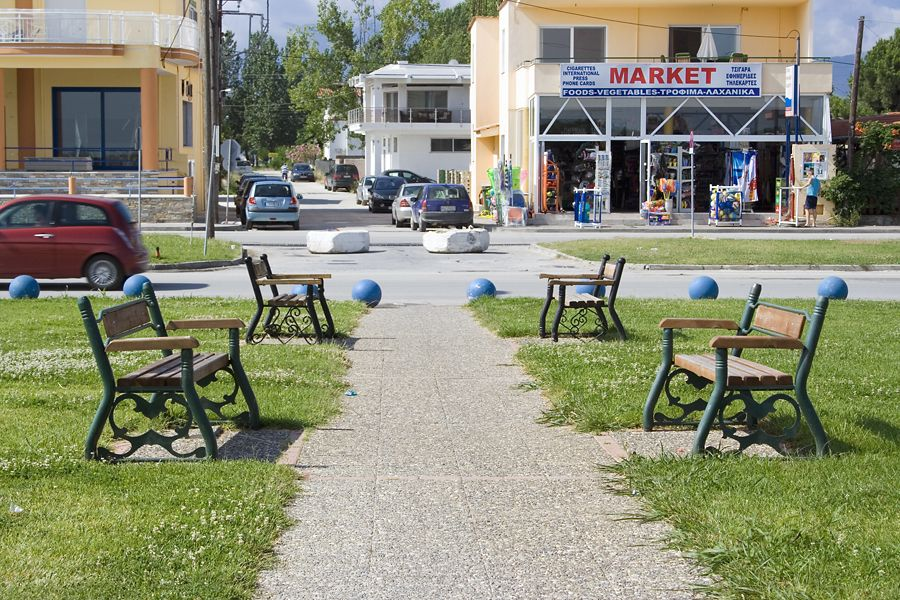
View of Keramoti
