= Pangaio =

Pangaio Παγγαίο
- Municipality
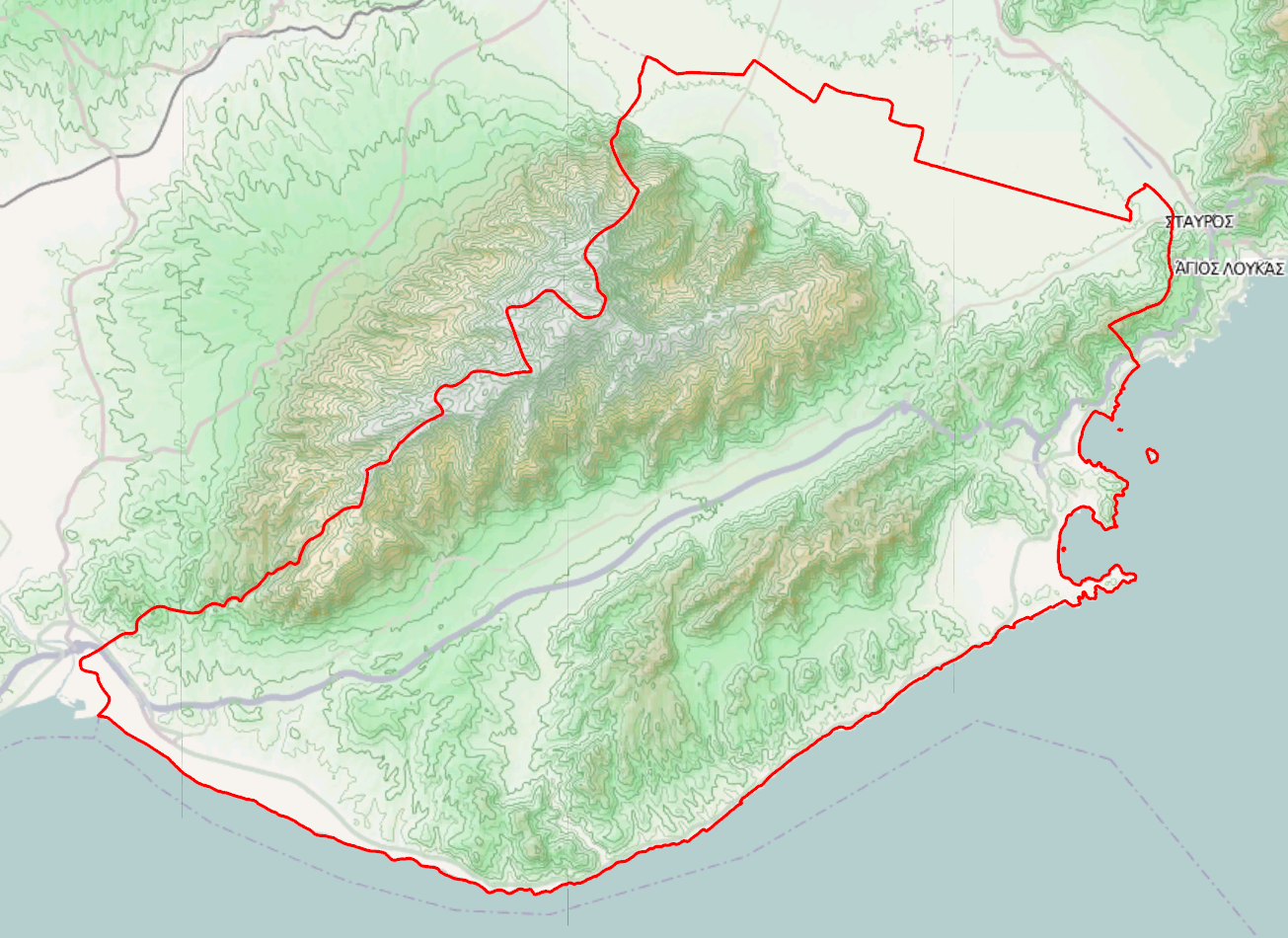

- Location within Greece
- Coordinates: 40°57′N 24°09′E
- Country: Greece
- Administrative region: East Macedonia and Thrace
- Regional unit: Kavala
- Seat: Eleftheroupoli

Area
  - Municipality: 701.4 km^{2} (270.8 sq mi)
  - Municipal unit: 79.6 km^{2} (30.7 sq mi)

Population (2021)
  - Municipality: 29,508
  - Density: 42.07/km^{2} (109.0/sq mi)
  - Municipal unit: 3,452
  - Municipal unit density: 43.4/km^{2} (112/sq mi)
- Time zone: UTC+2 (EET)
  - Summer (DST): UTC+3 (EEST)
- Vehicle registration: ΚΒ

Pangaio (Greek: Παγγαίο, romanized: Pangaío) is a municipality in the Kavala regional unit, Greece, named after the Pangaion hills. The seat of the municipality is in Eleftheroupoli.

== Municipality ==
The municipality Pangaio was formed at the 2011 local government reform by the merger of the following 5 former municipalities, that became municipal units:

- Eleftheres
- Eleftheroupoli
- Orfano
- Pangaio
- Piereis

The municipality has an area of 701.427 km^{2}, the municipal unit 79.634 km^{2}.

== Province ==
The province of Pangaio (Greek: Επαρχία Παγγαίου) was one of the provinces of the Kavala Prefecture. It had the same territory as the present municipality, except a part of the municipal unit Eleftheroupoli. It was abolished in 2006.

== See also ==
- Forest villages (Greece)
