= Orfani =

Orfani Ορφάνι
- Municipal unit
- Location within the regional unit

- Location within Greece
- Coordinates: 40°47′N 23°57′E
- Country: Greece
- Administrative region: East Macedonia and Thrace
- Regional unit: Kavala
- Municipality: Pangaio

Area
  - Municipal unit: 200.9 km^{2} (77.6 sq mi)

Population (2021)
  - Municipal unit: 5,076
  - Municipal unit density: 25.27/km^{2} (65.44/sq mi)
  - Community: 774
- Time zone: UTC+2 (EET)
  - Summer (DST): UTC+3 (EEST)
- Vehicle registration: ΚΒ

Orfani (Greek: Ορφάνι, formerly Ορφάνιον - Orfanion) is a village and a former municipality in the Kavala regional unit, East Macedonia and Thrace, Greece. The seat of the municipality was Galipsos. Since the 2011 local government reform it is part of the municipality Pangaio, of which it is a municipal unit (municipal unit of Orfano). The municipal unit has an area of 200.862 km^{2}. The municipal unit of Orfano has a population of 5,076, and the community of Orfani has 742 inhabitants (2021).

== History ==
In the Ottoman tahrir defter (number 167) of 1530, the settlement is recorded as a village with the name Orfana, within the kaza of Zihne. The town has been identified with the Byzantine Chrysopolis in Macedonia.
