= Kavala (regional unit) =

Kavala Περιφερειακή ενότητα Καβάλας
- Regional unit
- Municipalities of Kavala

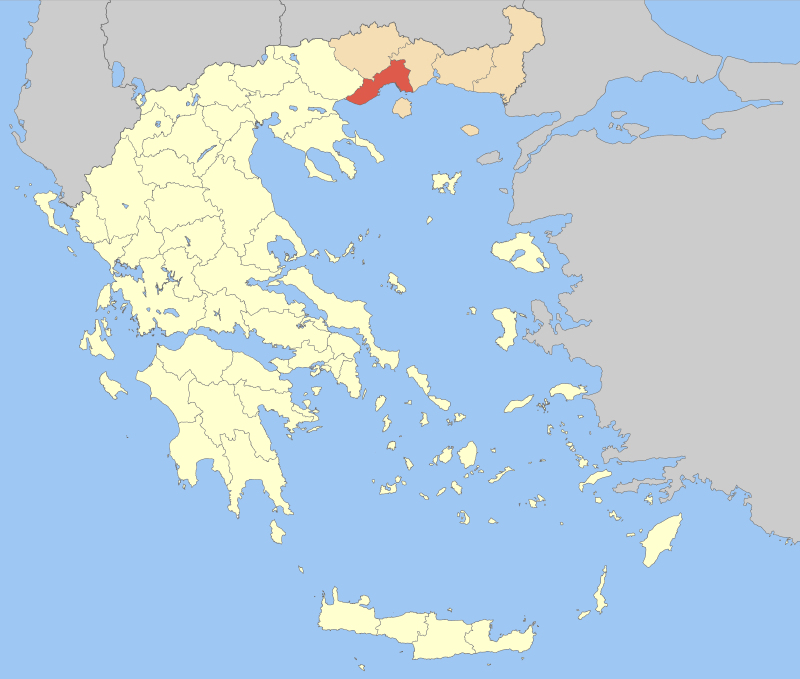
- Kavala within Greece

- Location within Greece
- Coordinates: 41°00′N 24°25′E
- Country: Greece
- Administrative region: Eastern Macedonia and Thrace
- Seat: Kavala

Area
  - Total: 1,728 km^{2} (667 sq mi)

Population (2021)
  - Total: 116,195
  - Density: 67.24/km^{2} (174.2/sq mi)
- Time zone: UTC+2 (EET)
  - Summer (DST): UTC+3 (EEST)
- Postal code: 64x xx, 65x xx
- Area code: 2510, 259x0
- Vehicle registration: ΚΒ

Kavala (Greek: Περιφερειακή Ενότητα Καβάλας, Perifereiakí Enótita Kaválas) is one of the regional units of Greece. It is part of East Macedonia and Thrace. Its capital is the city of Kavala. Kavala regional unit is the easternmost within the geographical region of Macedonia.

== Geography ==
The Pangaio mountains, reaching 1,957 m are situated in the west. The neighbouring regional units are Serres to the west, Drama to the north and Xanthi to the east. The river Nestos flows along the eastern border. Arable lands are located along the coastline, in the north and in the east.

The regional unit has a predominantly Mediterranean climate.

== Administration ==
The regional unit Kavala is subdivided into three municipalities. These are (number as in the map in the infobox):

- Kavala (1)
- Nestos (2)
- Pangaio (3)

=== Prefecture ===
As a part of the 2011 Kallikratis government reform, the former Kavala Prefecture (Greek: Νομός Καβάλας) was transformed into a regional unit within the East Macedonia and Thrace region. The prefecture also included the island of Thasos, which became a separate regional unit. At the same time, the municipalities were reorganised, according to the table below.

New municipality	Old municipalities	Seat
Kavala	Kavala	Kavala
Kavala	Filippoi	Kavala
Nestos	Chrysoupoli	Chrysoupoli
Nestos	Keramoti	Chrysoupoli
Nestos	Oreino	Chrysoupoli
Pangaio	Pangaio	Eleftheroupoli
Pangaio	Eleftheroupoli	Eleftheroupoli
Pangaio	Eleftheres	Eleftheroupoli
Pangaio	Orfani	Eleftheroupoli
Pangaio	Piereis	Eleftheroupoli

Thasos was and remained one municipality.

=== Provinces ===
- Province of Kavala: Kavala
- Province of Pangaio: Eleftheroupoli
- Province of Nestos: Chrysoupoli
- Province of Thasos: Thasos

Note: Provinces no longer hold any legal status in Greece.

== Transport ==
The A2 motorway, part of European route E90, is the main road through the regional unit: other notable roads include the EO2, EO12 and Amphipolis–Kavala national roads. The EO59 is just outside the regional unit near Amphipolis, while the EO69 is on the island of Thasos, accessible by ferry at Kavala.

== See also ==
- List of settlements in the Kavala regional unit
- Slavic toponyms of places in Kavala Prefecture
