= Thermopylae–Antirrio National Road =

Trunk road in Greece

Thermopylae–Antirrio National Road
- Εθνική Οδός Θερμοπυλών - Αντιρρίου
- Route of the Thermopylae–Antirrio National Road, in blue

Route information
- Auxiliary route of EO27
- Part of E65
- Length: 116.5 km (72.4 mi)
- Existed: 15 December 1995–present

Major junctions
- East end: Thermopylae
- West end: Antirrio

Location
- Country: Greece
- Regions: Central Greece; Western Greece
- Primary destinations: Thermopylae; Bralos; Chrisso; Itea; Nafpaktos; Antirrio

Highway system
- Highways in Greece; Motorways; National roads
← EO	→ EO

The Thermopylae–Antirrio National Road (Greek: Εθνική Οδός Θερμοπυλών - Αντιρρίου) is an unnumbered national road in central and western Greece, running between Thermopylae and Antirrio. Created by ministerial decree in 1995 and updated by the Register of National Roads in 1998, the road is a de facto extension of the EO27 on both sides, as well as being part of European route E65.

== Route ==
The Thermopylae–Antirrio National Road is officially defined as two-part east–west road in the Central Greece and Western Greece regions: the eastern part runs between Thermopylae and Bralos, while the western part runs between Chrisso and Antirrio, via Itea and Nafpaktos. Both segments are part of European route E65.

The Register of National Roads considers the Thermopylae–Antirrio National Road to be an extension of the EO27 on both sides, numbering it the EO27a for statistical purposes, but the road between Amfissa and Chrisso is part of the EO48: at the same time, the western part of the Thermopylae–Antirrio National Road (between Chrisso and Nafpaktos) provides a more direct alternative to the EO48.

== History ==
Ministerial Decision DMEO/e/O/1308 of 15 December 1995 created the Thermopylae–Antirrio National Road, originally defined as running between Itea (near Chrisso and the junction with the EO48) and Antirrio, and subclassified the road as part of the secondary network. In 1998, the Register of National Roads added the eastern segment, between Thermopylae and Bralos.
