= Theodoros Terzopoulos =

Greek theatre director

- Θεόδωρος Τερζόπουλος
- Born: 1945 (age 80–81); Makrygialos, Pieria, Greece
- Education: Kostis Michailidis’ Drama School (1965–1967); Berliner Ensemble (1972–1976)
- Occupations: Theatre director; dramaturge; actor
- Years active: 1965–present
- Known for: Theatre Group Attis; Attis Theatre
- Notable work: The Bacchae (1986); Dionysus (1988); Antigone (2011); The Return of Dionysus (2020)
- Website: Official website

Theodoros Terzopoulos (Greek: Θεόδωρος Τερζόπουλος; born 1945) is a Greek theatre director.

== Biography ==
Terzopoulos was born in 1945 in Makrygialos, Pieria, descending from a large farming family of Pontic origin.

He initially studied at the drama school of K. Michaelides in Athens (1965–67) and then at the Berliner Ensemble in East Berlin (1972–76). During his studies in East Germany he was significantly influenced by Heiner Müller.

Returning to Greece, he worked first in Thessaloniki, and then from 1978 with the National Theatre of Northern Greece, in which he directed four plays, and was the director of its associated drama school from 1981 to 1983. In 1985 he became director at the festival of ancient drama at the European Cultural Centre of Delphi. In the same year, he founded the theatre group Attis, with which he presented Euripides' The Bacchae in Delphi in 1986, gaining over the years international fame and recognition for his radical and pioneering direction. In 1993 he founded the Theatre Olympics, of which he also assumed the presidency.

During his career, he has directed numerous ancient Greek tragedies, as well as modern Greek and European pays, in festivals and theatres around the world, including a revival of The Bacchae at the Stanislavsky Electrotheatre in 2015. He has also received various awards. In 2015 he published the book Η Επιστροφή του Διόνυσου ('The Return of Dionysus'), which has been translated into several languages.

== Awards ==
Awards (selected):

- Lorca Award (for the performance Bacchae by Euripides), Barcelona, Spain, 1986.
- Stanislavski Award for best direction (for the performance Quartet by Heiner Muller), Moscow, 1993.
- Great Theatre Award (for the performance Persians by Aeschylus), Brazil, 1994.
- Award for Best Direction (for the performance Antigone by Sophocles), Festival of Nations, Seoul, 1994.
- Award for Best Direction (for the performance Dionysus), Bogota, Colombia, 1998.
- Award for Best Direction (for the performance Prometheus Bound by Aeschylus), New Delhi, India, 2000.
- Honorary Theatre Prize by the Union of Theatre Critics, Athens, Greece, 2006.
- Honorary Theatre Award, Istanbul, Turkey, 2006.
- Award for Best Performance (for the performance Promethues Bound by Aeschylus), Beijing, 2008.
- Award for Best Direction (for the performance Prometheus Bound by Aeschylus), Beijing, 2008.
- Award for Best Performance (for the performance Ajax by Sophocles), Merida, Spain, 2008.
- Award for Best Direction (for the performance Mauser by Heiner Müller), Audience Awards, Athens, Greece, 2010.
- Four Awards for Best Performance, Best Direction, Best Assemble Acting and Best Production (for the performance Antigone by Sophocles), Beijing, China, 2011.
- Best solo performance (for the performance Eremos), Moscow, 2011.
- Best solo performance (for the performance Jocasta), Moscow 2012.
- Granting of the supreme Indian title Shi by the President Ram Nath Kovind, Mumbai, 2018.
- Named Cultural Forum Ambassador by the Minister of Culture of Russia Vladimir Medinsky, Saint Petersburg, 2018.
- Awards for Best Performance, Best Direction (for the performance Mother Courage) and Best Female Actress Magnolia Award (for Elena Nemzer), Shanghai 2019.
- Award for Best Performance (for the performance Prometheus Bound), Modern Drama Valley Theatre, Shanghai, 2019.
- Award for Lifetime Achievement, Cairo International Theater Festival, 2019.
- Figaro National Theatre Award for the contribution to the development of world theatre, Saint Petersburg, 2020.
- International Theatre Award Yuri Liubimov, International Theatre Institute ITI and Yuri Liubimov Foundation, 2020.
- International Audience Award Zvezda Teatrala for the category «Best Performance directed by non-Russian director in Russia» for the staging of Mauser in Alexandrisnky Theatre, 2020.
- Award of ΜΙΤΕΜ Festival for the performance Ajax, the madness, Budapest, 2021.
- Award of ΜΙΤΕΜ Festival for the performance Amor, Budapest, 2022.
