= Greek National Road 50 =

Trunk road in Greece

National Road 50
- Εθνική Οδός 50
- Route of the EO50 road, in blue

Route information
- Length: 26.0 km (16.2 mi)
- Existed: 9 July 1963–present

Major junctions
- West end: Argostoli
- East end: Sami

Location
- Country: Greece
- Regions: Ionian Islands
- Primary destinations: Argostoli; Sami

Highway system
- Highways in Greece; Motorways; National roads
← EO48	→ EO51

Greek National Road 50 (Greek: Εθνική Οδός 50), abbreviated as the EO50, is a national road in the island of Cephalonia, Greece. The EO50 runs between Argostoli and Sami, and is one of five national roads that serve the Ionian Islands.

== Route ==
The EO50 is officially defined as an east–west road in the island of Cephalonia, running between Argostoli in the west and Sami in the east. According to Egnatia Odos (the former operator of the A2 motorway in Greece), the road used the De Bosset Bridge, which crosses the Bay of Argostoli: however, the bridge is now closed to motor vehicles, so in practice the EO50 circumnavigates the southern end of the bay (labelled on the map as X365).

== History ==
Ministerial Decision G25871 of 9 July 1963 created the EO50 from the old EO75, which existed by royal decree from 1955 until 1963, and followed the same route as the current EO50.
