= Park of Sculpture of the European Cultural Centre of Delphi =

Coordinates: 38.4830°N 22.4870°E

The Park of Sculpture of the European Cultural Centre of Delphi is a park located in Delphi, Phocis in Greece, which is dedicated to the international sculpture.

== History ==
The first thoughts on the establishment of the International Sculpture Park in Delphi started in the mid 1980s. More specifically, the creation of an International Park of Sculpture and International Gallery of Delphi were provided under the International Art Programme. Under the original proposal, the Park of Sculpture "would be an open-air museum of international contemporary sculpture that will be regularly updated [...]. At the same time it would be a multifaceted example to restore the lost balance and harmony in the triad: City, Art and Nature."

== Description ==
The first artwork of the Park of Sculpture was the emblematic work Shield (Athens 1986) by George Zongolopoulos, a water-powered sculpture of stainless metal, which is situated in the main entrance of the Conference Centre. The work, which was donated by the artist to the Centre of Delphi, was acquired in 1989 during the Second International Meeting on Fine Arts "The position of Fine Arts in today's societies", Delphi 25–28 August 1989.

The official opening of the Park of Sculpture took place on August 21, 1994 at the International Meeting of Sculpture, curated by Sania Papa, art theorist. Eleven renowned European artists participated creating as many projects. The artists and their assistants stayed in Delphi for three weeks and constructed their works in situ with materials of the region. These works are: ENDLESS PILLAR by Costas Varotsos IDOLOLATRY by Lydia Venieri SARAJEVO by Michel Gerard ALTAR by Alfredo Romano OMFALOS by Theodoulos Griroriou MODERN TOMB, by Patrick Reynaud PYTHON by Costas Tsoklis BLIND INCIDENTAL by Manuel Saiz

The only exceptions were three projects that were not constructed in situ: the work MMXD 3010, I-ΙΙ-ΙΙΙ by Jason Molfessis, a steel construction manufactured in a factory in Aspropyrgos and then transferred to Delphi as well as an interior steel sculpture THE MEETING POINT OF THE SANCTUARY & OF THE THEATRE AT THE BOTTOM OF THE SEA by Panayiotis Tanimanidis, and ARCHAIC CONSTRUCTIONS by Nikos Alexiou, interior work made of reed, papyrus and plexiglas, made at the artists’ workshops in Athens.

New sculptures by artists who stayed and worked in Delphi, exhibitions, gifts and purchases of symbolic price were added in the basic core the following years. These are:

DELPHIC SPIRIT by Aristeidis Patsoglou SPHINX 2 by Theodoros (Papadimitriou) HOMMAGE A APOLLON – photovoltaic work of art by Takis APOLLO'S MIRROR by Masaaki Noda APOLLO'S MIRROR II by Masaaki Noda TRIBUTE TO APOLLO, interior construction by Takis COLUMN by Yannis Parmakelis COLUMNS (2005) by Costas Tsoklis PRESENCE by Stephen Antonakos THE GOD SLEEPS IN THE STONES by Patrizia Molinari TOMB by Vana Xenou AIAKOS, by Venia Dimitrakopoulou SHIELD – MONUMENT by Takis Tastsioglou.
