= Greek National Road 48 =

Trunk road in Greece

Coordinates: 38.3820°N 22.3765°E

National Road 48
- Εθνική Οδός 48
- Route of the EO48 road, in blue

Route information
- Length: 181.4 km (112.7 mi)
- Existed: 9 July 1963–present

Major junctions
- East end: Livadeia
- West end: Antirrio

Location
- Country: Greece
- Regions: Central Greece; Western Greece
- Primary destinations: Livadeia; Arachova; Delphi; Amfissa; Pentapoli (for Lidoriki); Nafpaktos; Antirrio

Highway system
- Highways in Greece; Motorways; National roads
← EO46	→ EO50

National Road 48 (Greek: Εθνική Οδός 48, abbreviated as EO48) is a single carriageway road in central Greece. It connects the Greek National Road 5 at Antirrio with the town Livadeia, passing through Naupactus and Delphi. The section between Antirrio and Itea is part of European route E65. The EO48 passes through the regional units Aetolia-Acarnania, Phocis and Boeotia.

== Route ==
The EO48 is officially defined as an east–west route along the northern side of the Gulf of Corinth in Central Greece, from Boeotia to Aetolia-Acarnania: it runs between Livadeia in the east and Antirrio in the west, via Arachova, Delphi, Amfissa, Pentapoli (for Lidoriki), and Nafpaktos. Two short sections of the EO48, between Amfissa and Chrisso and between Nafpaktos and Antirrio, are part of the European route E65: the remainder of the E65 between Amfissa and Antirrio follows the Thermopylae–Antirrio National Road south of the EO48, bypassing Nafpaktos.

The EO48 connects with the EO3 at Livadeia, the EO27 at Amfissa, and the A5 motorway and EO5 at Antirrio. There are three tunnels longer than 100 metres (330 feet) on the EO48: west of Tsoukalades (Karakolithos tunnel, 300 m or 980 ft); east of Arachova (200 m or 660 ft); and west of Agios Georgios (100 m or 330 ft).

== History ==
Ministerial Decision G25871 of 9 July 1963 created the EO48 from part of the short-lived EO18, which ran between Livadeia and Ioannina, via Antirrio. In 1978, the EO48 was realigned away from Lidoriki, due to the creation of a reservoir to supply drinking water in Attica.
