= European Cultural Centre of Delphi =

Venue in Delphi, Greece

The European Cultural Centre of Delphi (ECCD) was founded in 1977 upon the inspiration and initiative of Konstantinos Karamanlis with the view of setting up a European and intellectual centre in Delphi.

The first thoughts and discussions started in the 1930s when, in the aftermath of the Delphic Festivals (1927 & 1930), the Parliament and the Senate passed a law providing for the establishment and organization of an International Intellectual Cooperation Centre of Peoples similar to the "treasures" of the ancient Greek city of Delphi.

In 1957, Greece filed a draft proposal to the Council of Europe for the Foundation of an Intellectual Centre in Delphi, which was also accepted. The construction for the conference venue began in 1966. The cost was covered by state funds and funds of the Council of Europe.

In 1977, by an act of the Greek Parliament, the European Cultural Centre of Delphi (ECCD) was established as a "corporate body under private law", under the supervision of the Hellenic Ministry of Culture and the auspices of the Council of Europe.

According to its founding law, its aim is to "serve international cultural interests" and "develop common cultural principles that will unite the peoples of Europe" through the "publication of studies on European culture, the organization of cultural meetings and other artistic activities…”

The board of directors of the European Cultural Centre of Delphi consists of 11 members, 7 of which are Greek, while the remaining members are appointed from countries participating in the Council of Europe. The Secretary General of the Council of Europe and representatives from the Greek Ministries of Culture and Foreign Affairs respectively are council members by office. The other members are personalities from the realms of the Letters and Arts. The board of directors and the managing Director of the ECCD are appointed by decision of the Minister of Culture and their term is renewed every three years. The Ministry of Culture finances the ECCD's regular budget.

== Facilities ==
=== Delphi ===
The Conference Centre of the European Cultural Centre of Delphi is located on the western edge of the village of Delphi. Its facilities are spread in a wooded area of 10 hectares and include a Conference Centre, a Guesthouse and an open-air theater. The Conference Centre and the Guesthouse were built in the mid-1960s, designed by Kostas Kitsikis and Anthony Lampakis, and are a typical architectural example of the Modern Movement. The facilities are an elegant architectural ensemble of autonomous discrete buildings that follow the natural slope of the mountain, with large windows and patios.

The Conference Center has two main and four auxiliary Conference halls, a library and secretarial facilities. The Guesthouse is a modern midsized hotel unit, with a total of 46 rooms, terraces, a bar, a restaurant, lounge and a reception. In 2005 the open-air theater Frynihos was added to the Centre's infrastructure, designed by architects Eleni Chatzinikolaou and Solon Xenopoulos, in the style of the ancient theaters, lined with stone, with a capacity of 1,100 seats. The theatre's ground floor is equipped with a ground-level Multi-Purpose Conference Hall suitable for exhibitions and seminars. The view to the olive grove of Amfissa and the bay of Itea is magnificent, while the lush gardens and the pine groves of the Conference Center offer to the visitor the opportunity to tour the Park of Sculpture with important works by contemporary European artists.

=== Athens ===
The Central Offices are housed in a neoclassical building of 518 sqm, in Plaka. The building dates back to the late 19th century and for decades it was the residence of a well known Athenian family. It was purchased by the European Cultural Centre of Delphi in 1983 and was restored to its original form. Changes to the interior were kept to the minimum required by its new function with offices on the ground floor and the first floor while the basement is a single room, which hosts occasional small artistic events, lectures, seminars etc.

== Activities ==
=== Main Event ===
The annual central event of the European Cultural Centre of Delphi is usually organized during the first ten days of July and includes an international scientific symposium and artistic program (theater, music, visual arts, dance performances, documentaries etc.). The general theme is decided at a special ECCD board of directors Meeting. Some of them include the International Meetings on Ancient Greek Drama, the International Meetings of Music and Musicology, the International Meeting "Apollo", the Cultural Amphictyony etc.

Special events are held to commemorate important anniversaries such as the Tribute to the Delphic Festivals, held at the seventy-year anniversary from the First Delphic Festival in 1997, the International Symposium "From the Enlightenment to the Revolutions" in the 200th anniversary from the death of Rigas Velestinlis, the "Year of Socrates", on the occasion of 2,400 years after the death of the great Athenian philosopher, the "Year of Pericles-Year of Democracy" on the occasion of the 2,500 years since the birth of the great Athenian statesman, the "Year of Marathon", at the 2,500 anniversary from the historic battle, the "Year of Cavafy", etc.

=== Delphi Economic Forum ===
The Delphi Economic Forum has been hosted in the European Cultural Centre of Delphi annually since its establishment in 2016. It is an international conference regarding finance, politics, science and more. It has more than 2,500 attendees each year and up to 1000 speakers or more, who consist of politicians, academics and journalists, with key people such as world leaders present in all of the conferences.

=== International Meetings of Ancient Drama ===
The fourteen International Meetings on Ancient Greek Drama, from 1985 until today, constitute some of the most prestigious events of the European Cultural Centre of Delphi were. The International Meetings on Ancient Greek Drama are a multi-dimensional programme combining the theoretical approach to theatre with selected theater productions and theatrical education. The purpose of the Meetings on Ancient Greek Drama is the recording of different approaches and schools in ancient drama and the presentation of new artistic proposals. Internationally acclaimed Greek theatre director Theodoros Terzopoulos was in charge of the International Meetings of Ancient Drama in the periods 1985–1989 and 1995–2004.

In the framework of the International Meetings of Ancient Drama, ECCD has cooperated with the following institutions: International Committee of Theatre Olympics, Istanbul International Theatre Festival (Turkey), International Institute for the Mediterranean Theatre (Spain), Shizuoka Performing Arts Center (Japan), National Royal Theatre Studio (United Kingdom), Watermill Foundation – Robert Wilson (US), Taganka Theatre -Yuri Lyubimov (Russia), Moscow School of Dramatic Art-Anatoli Vasiliev (Russia), Cultural Bureau of Beijing, Ruhr European Festival (Germany), National Theatre of Luxemburg, Ludwigshafen Theatre Pfalzbau (Germany), National Theatre Zagreb (Croatia), Art Carnuntum World Theatre Festival (Αustria), ATALAYA Theatre Centre (Spain), CHOREA Theatre Association (Poland), Grotowski Institute (Poland), Centre for Theatre Practices GARDZIENICE (Poland), Cyprus Theatre Organisation and others. Cooperation with Greek organisations: National Theatre, National Opera, National Theatre of Northern Greece, Art Theatre-Karolos Koun, Spyros Evangelatos Theatre, ATTIS Theatre, Regional-Municipal Theater of Agrinio, Regional-Municipal Theater of Roumeli, Regional-Municipal Theater of Larissa-Thessalian Theatre, etc.

=== Fine Arts Programme ===
The Fine Arts program of the ECCD includes symposia, exhibitions, seminars and artists in residence (stay and work) programs in Delphi. It started in 1988 with the International Meeting "Fine Arts at the end of the 20th century" during which symposia and paintings and sculpture exhibitions were organised. In 1994, the fine arts programme was redefined aiming at creating the Park of Sculpture at Delphi and to enrich the permanent collection of modern art.

=== Park of Sculpture ===
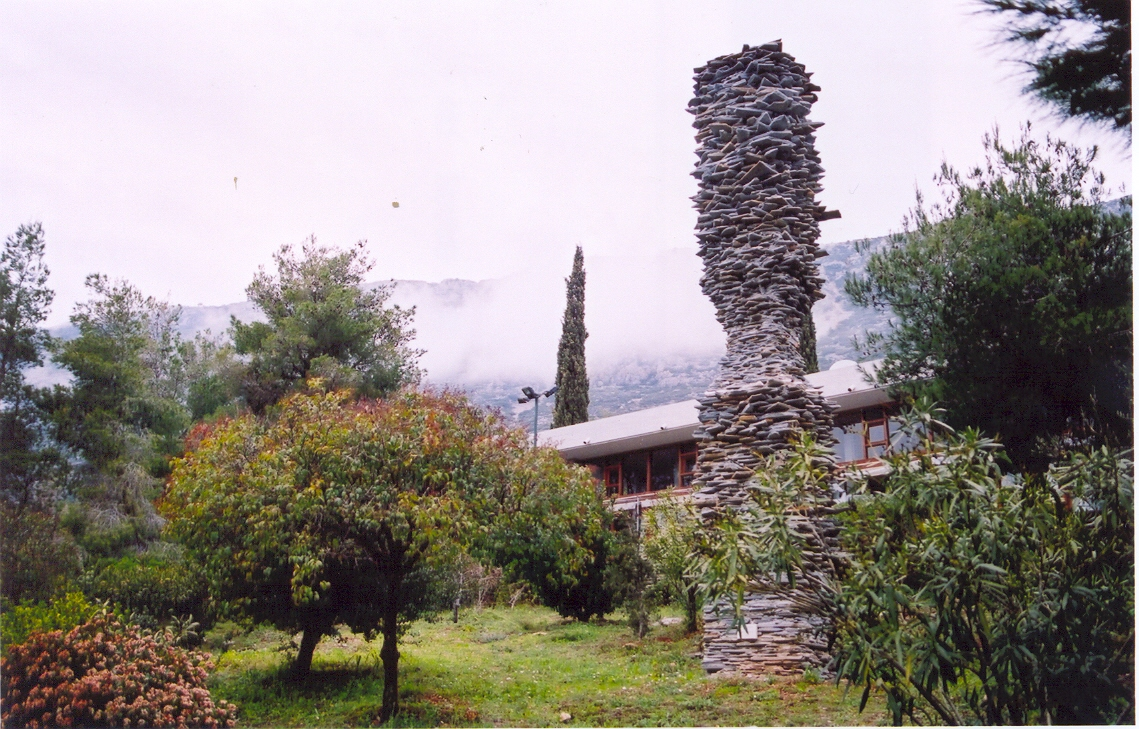
A sculpture by Kostas Varotsos

The first group of art works was obtained during the International Meeting of Sculpture (August 1994) when 11 famous European artists created their respective artworks in situ. Since then, the Park of Sculpture has been enriched with new acquisitions by artists staying and working in Delphi.

=== Collection of interior works of art ===
The collection includes creations by famous Greek and foreign artists (paintings, engravings, constructions) that were either acquired by the ECCD or were obtained through international Fine Arts Meetings and exhibitions. Some of the Fine Arts exhibitions are: “Takis-Chryssa”, “Giannis Kounelis and the Theatre”, “Apollo’s heritage” (group exhibition), “Columns and Pillars” (group exhibition), ‘Peace”- installation by Costas Tsoklis, Alekos Fasianos ”Anthropocentric Painting 1960–1998”, “Horses and Armour” by Alexandra Athanassiadi, “Bella Raftopoulou” (retrospective), “the Battle of Marathon through the work of eight Greek artists”, “Worship and shrines after the Fall of Constantinople through the Collections of the Benaki Museum", "C.P.Cavafy: This Little Pencil Portrait " etc.

=== Εducational Programmes ===
==== Seminars on Ancient Greek Language ====
The Seminars on Ancient Greek Language and Culture started out in 1995 aiming at the training of secondary school teachers of the European countries in Ancient Greek language. The Seminars are organized every year with the participation of 60, per average, school teachers each time from different countries. They are lectured by University professors of classical studies and of specialised research centres from Greece and the respective country. The educational programme with duration of two weeks includes teaching of ancient Greek language through computers for the study and research of philosophical texts and analysis of arguments.

==== National Student Debate Contests ====
The National Student Debate Contests are organised jointly with the Ministry of Education, Lifelong Learning and Religious Affairs and aim at the promotion of critical thought among young people and the development of their skills in public speaking and arguments. The Competition was organized for the first time in 2001, within the framework of the Year of Socrates and has been held annually ever since. The Contest is held under strict rules and regulations of conduct and are addressed to all third-year Lyceum students either from state-run or private schools.

==== Meeting of Young Artists ====
The Meetings of Young Artists began in 2007. Its aim was to promote creative thinking, open interaction and involvement of young artists in innovative partnerships through a programme of workshops, lectures and artistic activities. The instructors are distinguished personalities in the field of theater and the performing arts from Greece and abroad. During the meetings, a number of young artists and artistic groups are given the opportunity to create and present in Delphi, an original work of short duration in the form of theatrical performance in progress, site specific, video art, music, dance theater, performance art, etc.

==== Hydraulis ====
The research programme for the restoration of the Ancient Hydraulis – the first keyboard musical instrument in history – begun in 1995 and was completed in May 1999. The study of various ancient sources (Hero of Alexandria, Vitruvius etc.) was needed for the reconstruction of the organ, research was made in the ancient Greek music scales, the use and processing of the various materials by the ancient Greeks (metal, wood, leather etc.) was also studied. For the construction of the pipes, archaeologist and Professor at the University of Thessaloniki Dimitris Pantermalis and his associates followed closely the archaeological findings of the Hydraulis of Dion. The copy of the ancient Hydraulis was presented in Delphi in May 1995. In the following 15 years the Hydraulis was presented in many places both in Greece and abroad (Tokyo and Shizuoka, for the events of the 100th anniversary of diplomatic relations between Greece and Japan – Athens Concert Hall – Hannover, EXPO 2000 – Madrid, 2nd International Exhibition "Madrid por la Ciencia" – London, Queen Elizabeth Hall – Italy, Croton – Stockholm, Medelhavsmuseet – Washington D.C., The Corcoran Gallery, Archaeological Museum of Delphi etc. ).
