= Theatre Olympics =

Theatre-oriented non-profit organisation

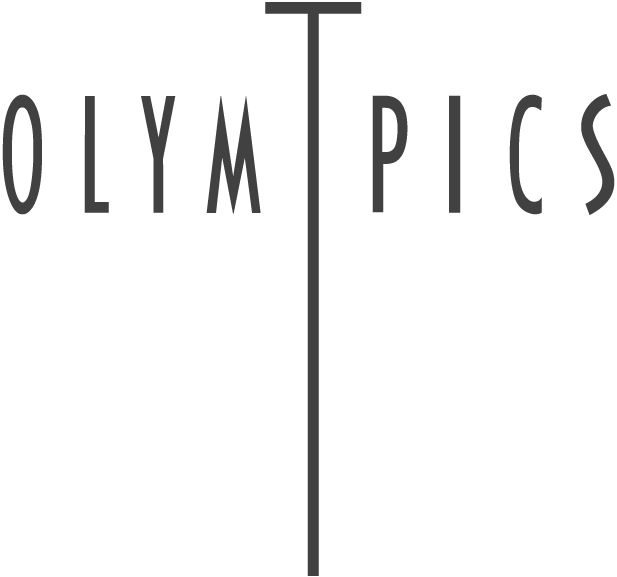
- Genre: Performance festival
- Frequency: Variable
- Location: Various
- Years active: 27
- Inaugurated: 1995
- Founders: Theodoros Terzopoulos

Theatre Olympics (Greek: Διεθνής Θεατρική Ολυμπιάδα) is a non-profit organisation that promotes theatrical exchange where dialogue between different theatremakers, irrespective of ideological, culture and language differences is encouraged. The primary output of the organisation is an international multicultural, multidisciplinary theatre festival (also called the Theatre Olympics), which aims to embrace different theatre traditions, respect diverse cultures and encourage intercultural networking among theatre artists around the world. The Theatre Olympics are held infrequently and in various locations around the globe. Each festival is organised around a broad theme.

Established in 1994 by an international committee led by Greek theatre director, Theodoros Terzopoulos, The Theatre Olympics originally had the subtitle "Crossing Millennia" to reflect the importance the organisation placed on connecting the past, present, and future of human cultural endeavours and to reflect the festival's aim to re-establish the importance of theatre in the cultural life of the twenty-first century. Despite the name, there are no competitive elements or prizes awarded at the Theatre Olympics.

The organisation's administrative headquarters are located in Athens, Greece (European office) and in Toga, Toyama, Japan (Asian office). The Theatre Olympics logo is used for every festival and was designed by the American theatre director, Robert Wilson.

== Committee ==
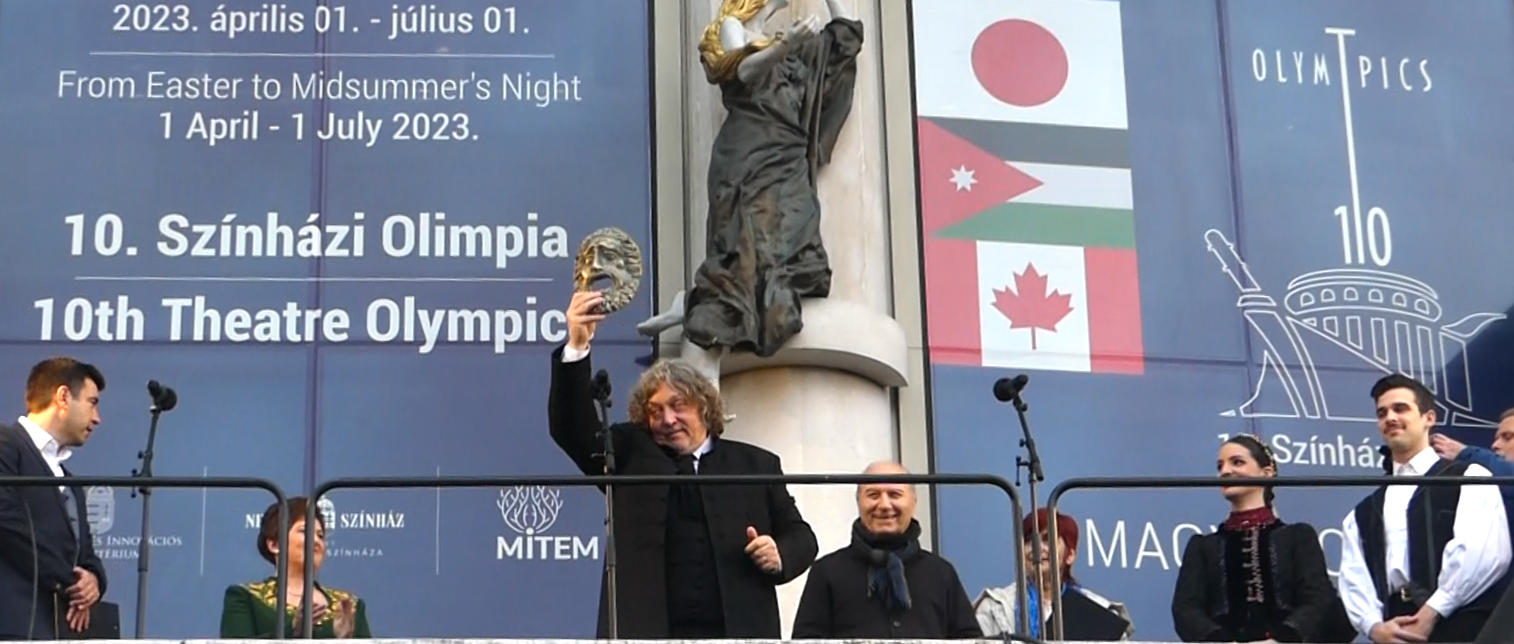
*Theodoros Terzopoulos in 2023

The first official meeting of the International Committee of Theatre Olympics took place on 18 June 1994 in Delphi, Greece, however discussions between the members had been ongoing since 1989. The founding committee was a group of eight internationally renowned theatre directors: Theodoros Terzopoulos, Nuria Espert, Antunes Filho, Tony Harrison, Yuri Lyubimov, Heiner Müller, Tadashi Suzuki and Robert Wilson. The International Committee of Theatre Olympics meets once a year. New members can join after being recommended by one of the existing members and being approved by two-thirds of the committee.

Currently the International Committee of Theatre Olympics consists of fifteen members:

- Theodoros Terzopoulos (Greece) – chairman
- Giorgio Barberio Corsetti (Italy)
- Choi Chyrim (South Korea)
- Nuria Espert (Spain)
- Jan Fabre (Belgium)
- Antunes Filho (Brazil)
- Jurgen Flimm (Germany)
- Valery Fokin (Russia)
- Jarosław Fret (Poland)
- Tony Harrison (United Kingdom)
- Georges Lavaudant (France)
- Liu Lubin (China)
- Wole Soyinka (Nigeria)
- Tadashi Suzuki (Japan)
- Ratan Thiyam (India)
- Attila Vidnyánszky (Hungary)
- Robert Wilson (United States)

Former founding members of the Theatre Olympics:

- Yuri Lyubimov (1995–2014) (Russia)
- Heiner Müller (1995–1995) (Germany)

== Hosting countries ==
The Theatre Olympics are held in a different country each edition. So far there have been ten festivals. The festival allows the host country to reflect their own theatre heritage and the event is reinvented each time by a new artistic director – who is usually an International Committee member of the Theatre Olympics. The festival's national organising committee usually consists of prominent representatives of the country's cultural life.

The hosting cities have been:

City / Country	Year	Theme	Artistic Director/s	Number of Productions	Number of Countries	Additional information
Delphi, Greece	1995	Tragedy	Theodoros Terzopoulos	9	7	The inaugural edition was focused around Greek tragedy.
Shizuoka, Japan	1999	Creating Hope	Tadashi Suzuki	42	20	For the second edition, the organisers created an art village in the Japanese industrial city, Shizuoka, which was designed by the famous architect, Arata Isozaki. The Shizuoka Performing Arts Center (SPAC) was opened to mark the occasion.
Moscow, Russia	2001	Theatre for the People	Yuri Lyubimov	97	32	The third edition was presented alongside the Chekhov International Theatre Festival. The festival incorporated a large-scale outdoor programme, where 40 theatres from 15 countries were presented.
Istanbul, Turkey	2006	Beyond Borders	Theodoros Terzopoulos and Dikmen Gürün	38	13	The fourth edition was a joint-festival with the fifteenth International Istanbul Theatre Festival (IITF).
Seoul, South Korea	2010	Sarang: Love and Humanity	Choi Chyrim	48	13	The fifth edition placed an emphasis upon theatre's role in and contribution to globalisation. The festival also coincided with Seoul rebranding itself as “the city of culture and the arts".
Beijing, China	2014	Dream	Liu Lubin	46	22	The sixth edition's theme "Dream", was divided into three sub-themes: "In Memory of the Classics," "Vitality and Creativity" and "Audiovisual Feast."
Wrocław, Poland	2016	The World as a Place of Truth	Jarosław Fret	86	14	The seventh edition was organised by Poland's Grotowski Institute. The festival's theme is a paraphrase of the title of a speech that Jerzy Grotowski gave in 1976. The festival also coincided with Wrocław being the 2016 European Capital of Culture.
Delhi, India	2018	The Flag of Friendship	Waman Kendre	465	35	The eighth edition was held in 17 different cities around India, with the opening ceremony in New Delhi and closing ceremony in Mumbai.
Saint Petersburg, Russia and Toyama, Japan	2019	Creating Bridges	Valery Fokin and Tadashi Suzuki	50	21	The ninth edition was the first time the Theatre Olympics was hosted in two countries.
Budapest, Hungary	2023	'O Man, strive on, strive on, have faith; and trust'	Vidnyánszky Attila	750	58	The tenth edition is focused around autonomy, liberty and helping the access to culture.
