= Greek National Road 27 =

Trunk road in Greece

Coordinates: 38.6161°N 22.3733°E

National Road 27
- Εθνική Οδός 27
- Route of the EO27 road, in blue

Route information
- Part of E65
- Length: 36.7 km (22.8 mi)
- Existed: 9 July 1963–present

Major junctions
- South end: Amfissa
- North end: Bralos

Location
- Country: Greece
- Regions: Central Greece
- Primary destinations: Amfissa; Bralos

Highway system
- Highways in Greece; Motorways; National roads
← EO26	→ EO28

Greek National Road 27 (Greek: Εθνική Οδός 27), abbreviated as the EO27, is a national road in central Greece. The EO27 runs mostly within the Phocis regional unit, between Amfissa and Bralos, and is part of European route E65. Recently, the EO27 has been extended by the Thermopylae–Antirrio National Road, although the road between Amfissa and Chrisso is part of the EO48.

== Route ==
The EO27 is officially defined as a north–south road that runs mostly within the Phocis regional unit, with a small section at the northern end being in Phthiotis: the road runs between Amfissa in the south and Bralos in the north, passing by Gravia. The entire route is part of European route E65.

Recently, the EO27 has been extended by the Thermopylae–Antirrio National Road, which is numbered the EO27a for statistical purposes, but the road between Amfissa (the southern end of the EO27) and Chrisso is part of the EO48.

== History ==
Ministerial Decision G25871 of 9 July 1963 created the EO27 from the old EO22, which existed by royal decree from 1955 until 1963, and followed the same route as the current EO27. The EO27 later became part of the current International E-road network on 15 March 1983: it was never part of the original network from 1950 to 1983.
