= Delphi Economic Forum =

Greek nonprofit organization

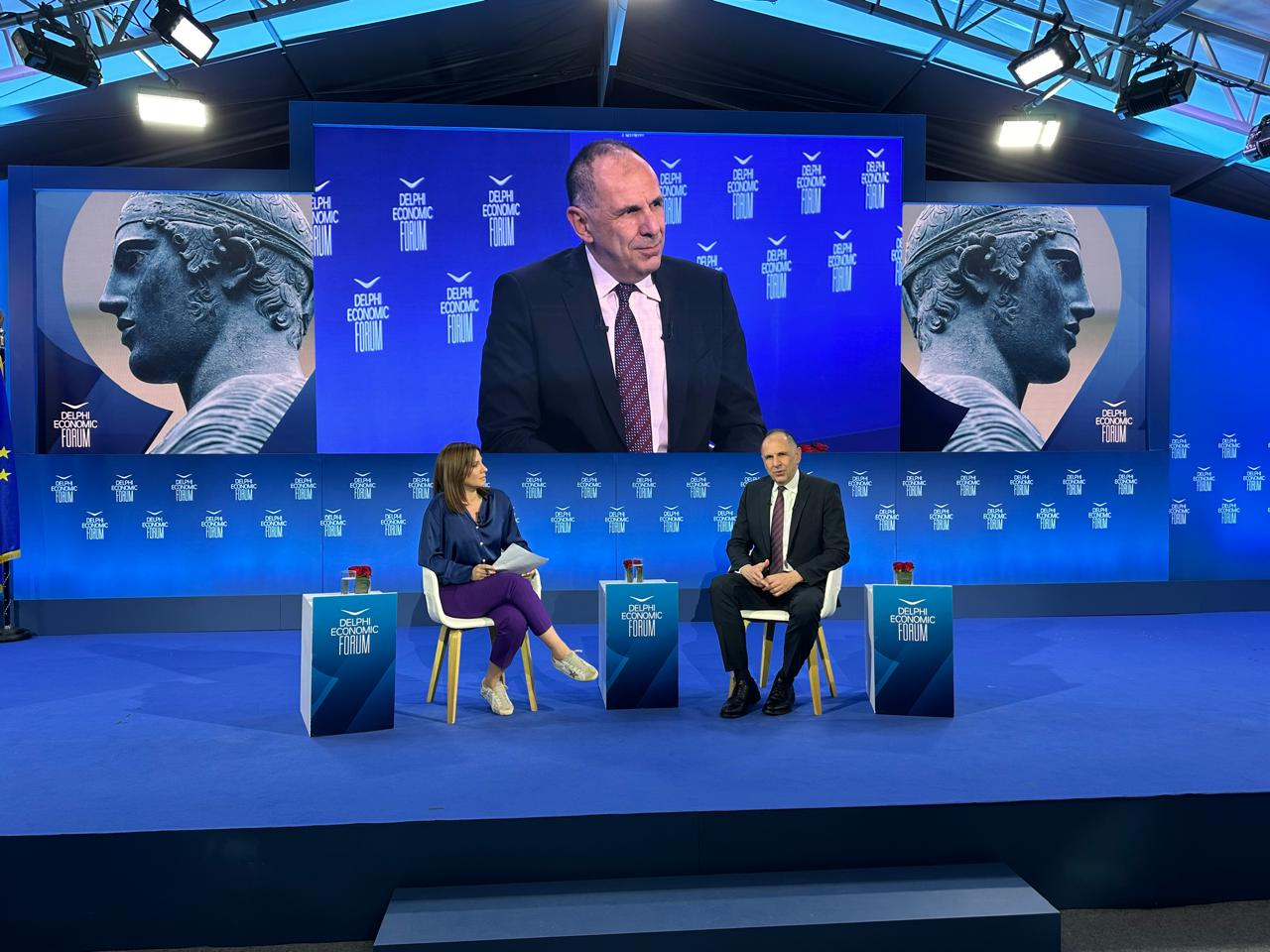
- Giorgos Gerapetritis, the Greek Minister of Foreign Affairs, at the 2024 Delphi Economic Forum
- Formation: 2016
- Type: Nonprofit
- Headquarters: Athens, Greece
- Region served: International
- Official language: English and Greek
- Founder and President: Symeon Tsomokos
- Website: https://delphiforum.gr/

The Delphi Economic Forum (DEF) is a Greek nonprofit organization, primarily known for organizing and hosting its annual international conference on topics such as finance, politics, science and global affairs, with particular emphasis in the regions of Eastern Mediterranean and Southern Europe.

Based in Athens, its annual conference takes place in Delphi, close to the archaeological site of the same name, one of the most significant locations in ancient Greece, and historically regarded by the ancient Greeks as the center of the world.

== Annual Conference ==
Since its establishment in 2016 there has been a Delphi Economic Forum conference every year, with most lasting around four days and all hosted in the European Cultural Centre of Delphi, except the 2020 conference which had to be held virtually due to the COVID-19 pandemic and it was broadcast from the Zappeion Hall in Athens. Each conference has up to 1000 speakers or more and they mostly consist of politicians, academics and journalists, with key people such as world leaders present in all of them.

== Other events ==
The Delphi Economic Forum is partnering with other organizations each year to organize conferences outside Greece, such as in Washington D.C., Paris, Toronto, Brussels, Bucharest and elsewhere, while it is also hosting multiple digital events.

== Gallery ==
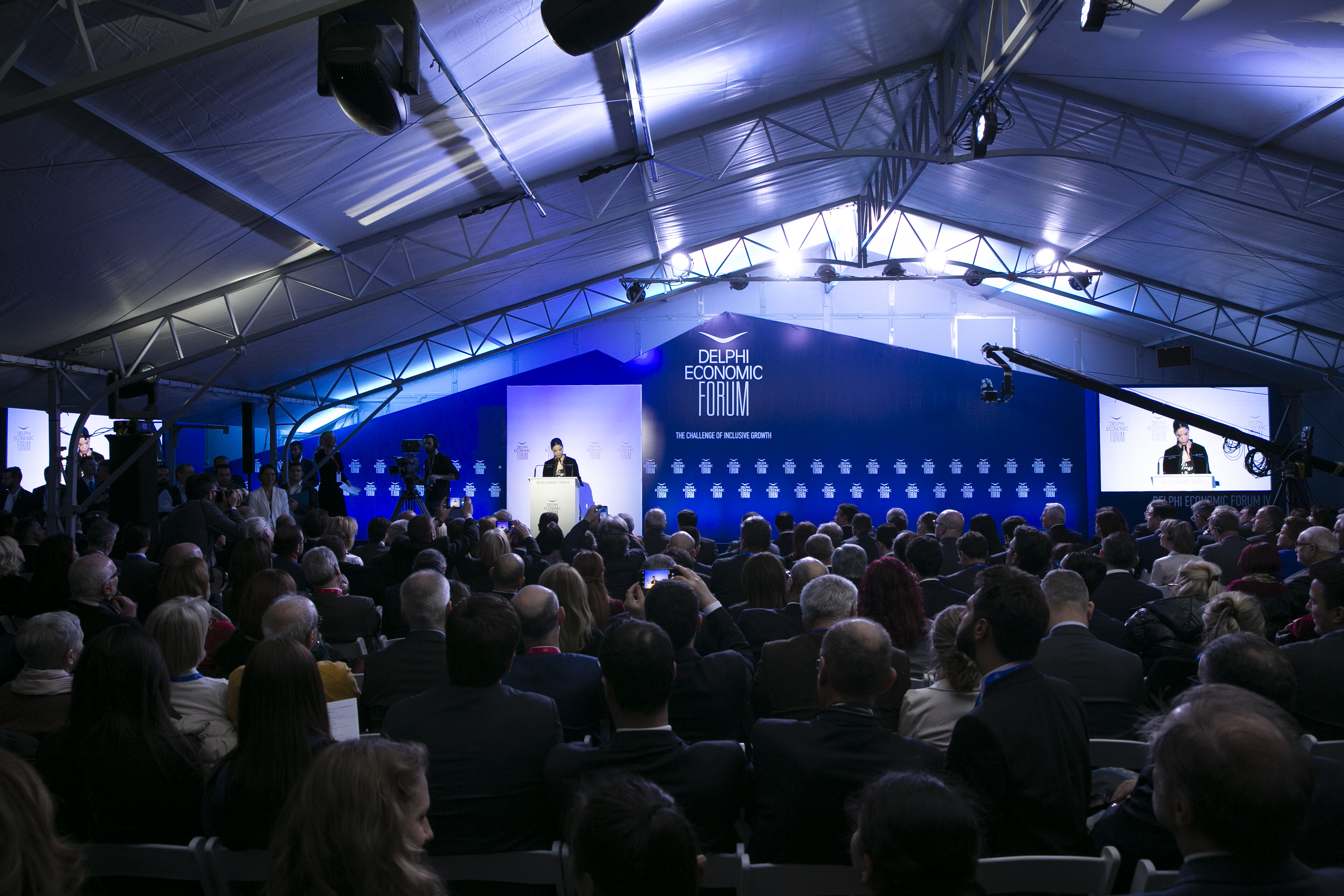
A venue of the 2018 Delphi Economic Forum.

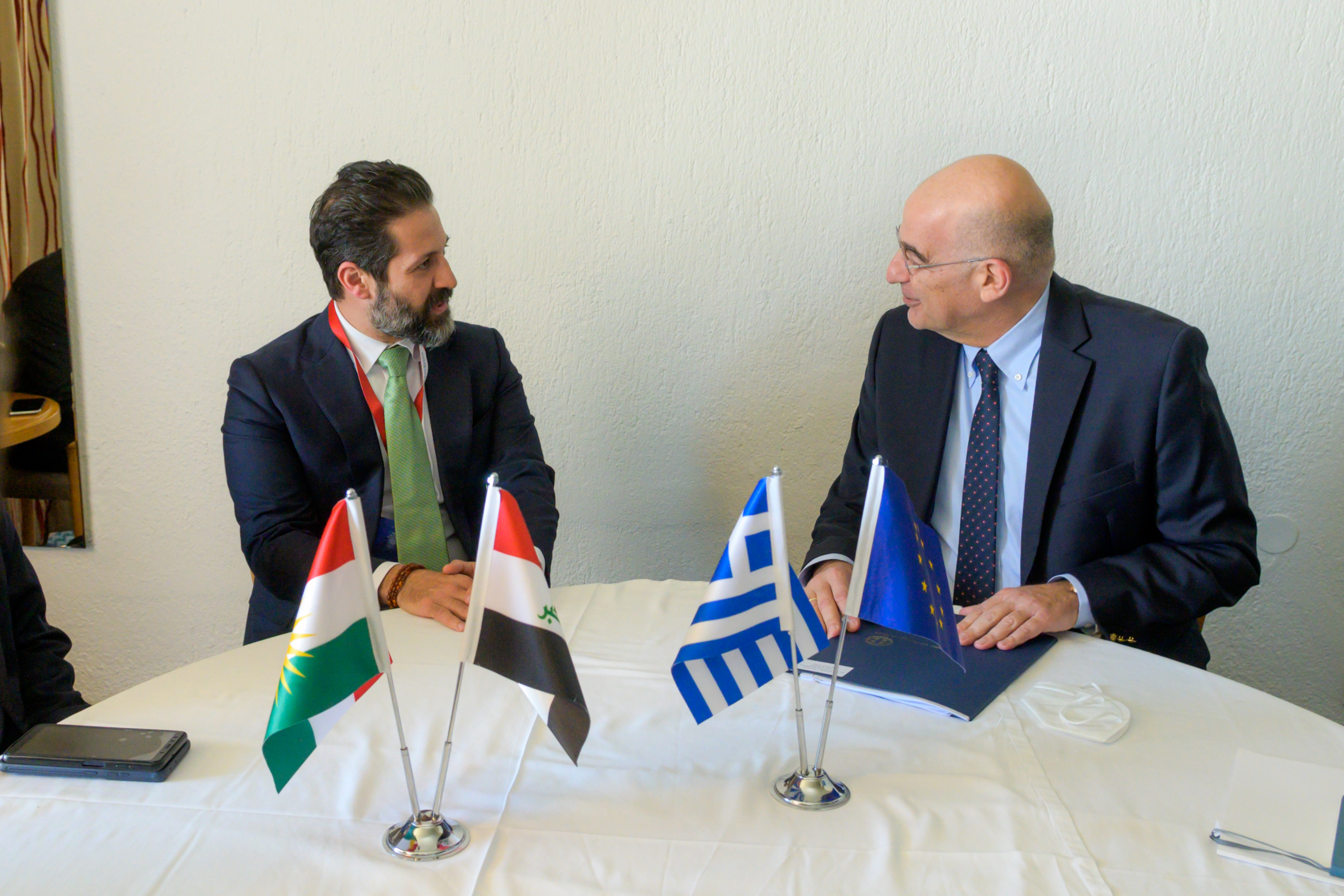
Qubad Talabani, deputy prime minister of the Kurdistan Region of Iraq, with Nikos Dendias, Greek Minister of Foreign Affairs, at the 2022 Delphi Economic Forum.

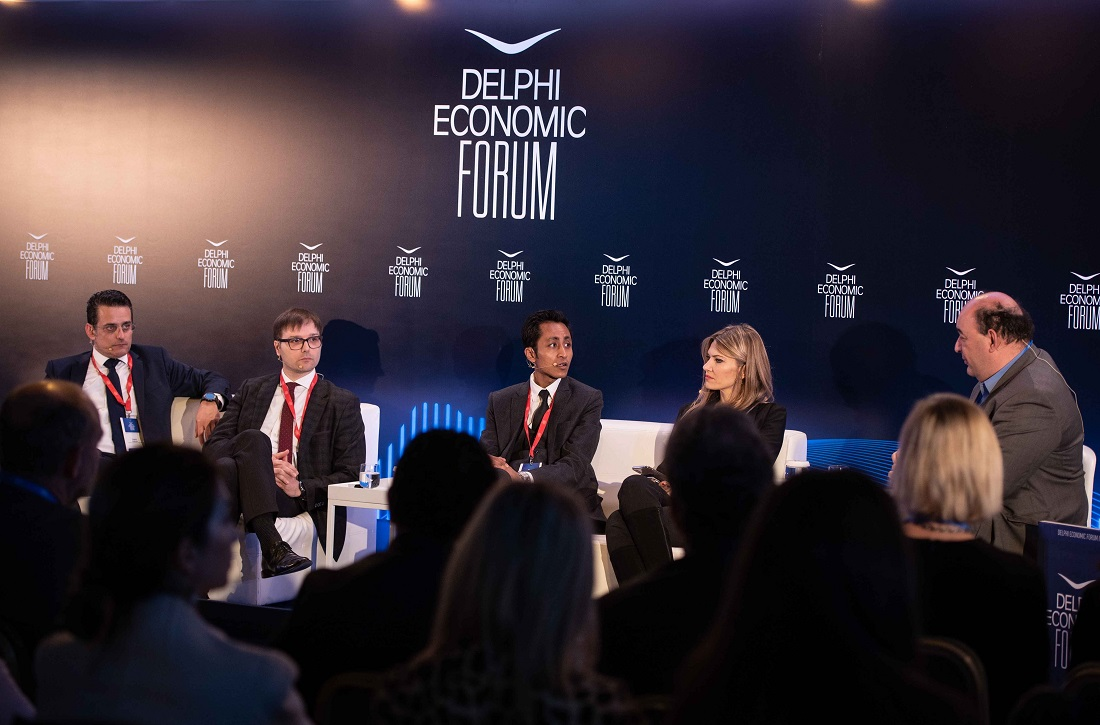
Sheikh Mohammed Irfan, Bangladeshi-American venture capitalist, serial entrepreneur and technology strategist, in the 2019 Delphi Economic Forum.

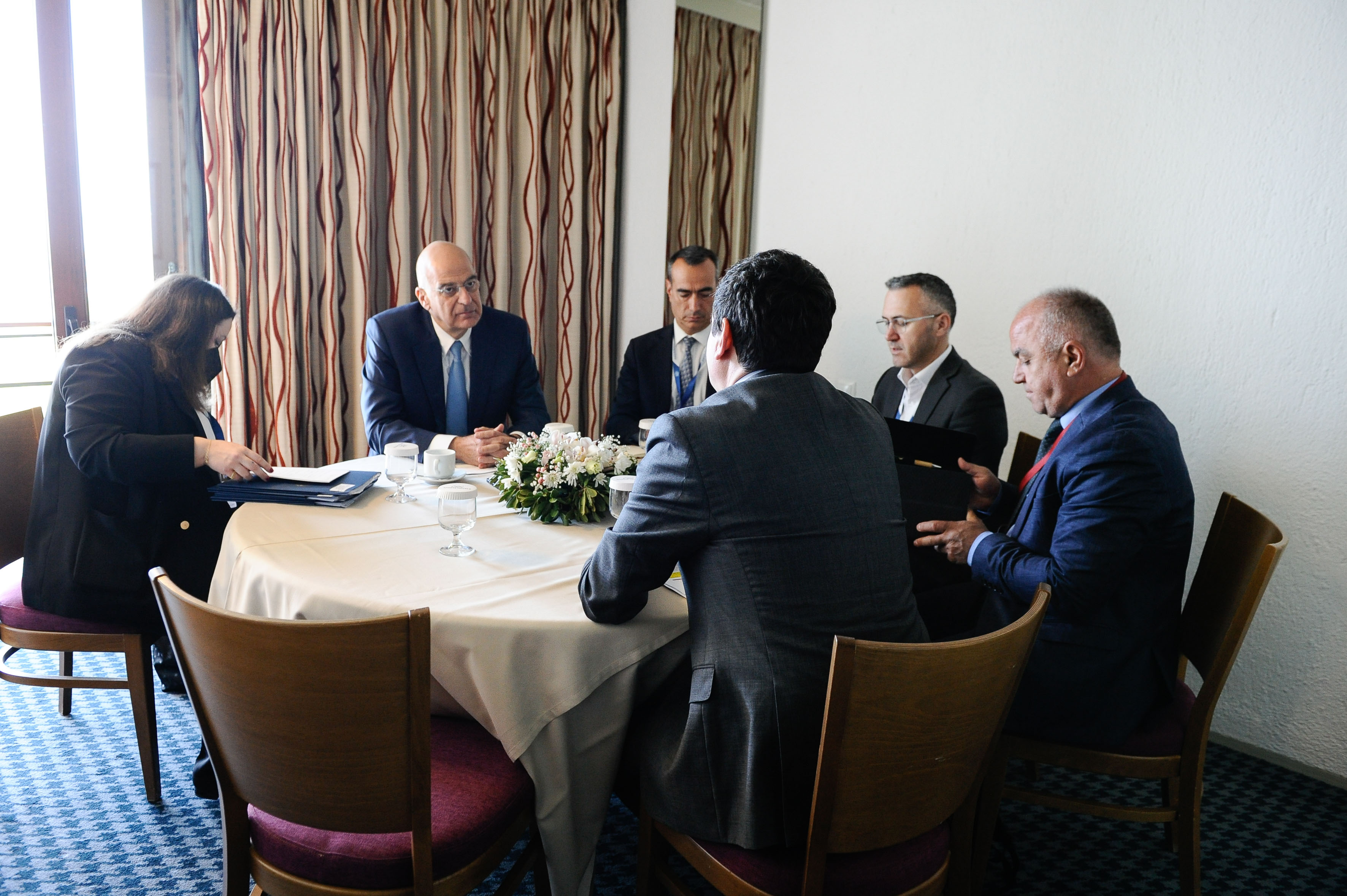
Albin Kurti, Prime Minister of Kosovo, with Stuart Peach, UK PM’s Special Envoy to the Western Balkans, and Nikos Dendias, Greek Minister of Foreign Affairs, at the 2023 Delphi Economic Forum.
