= Delphi (modern town) =

Town in Phocis, Greece

Delphi Δελφοί
- Municipality
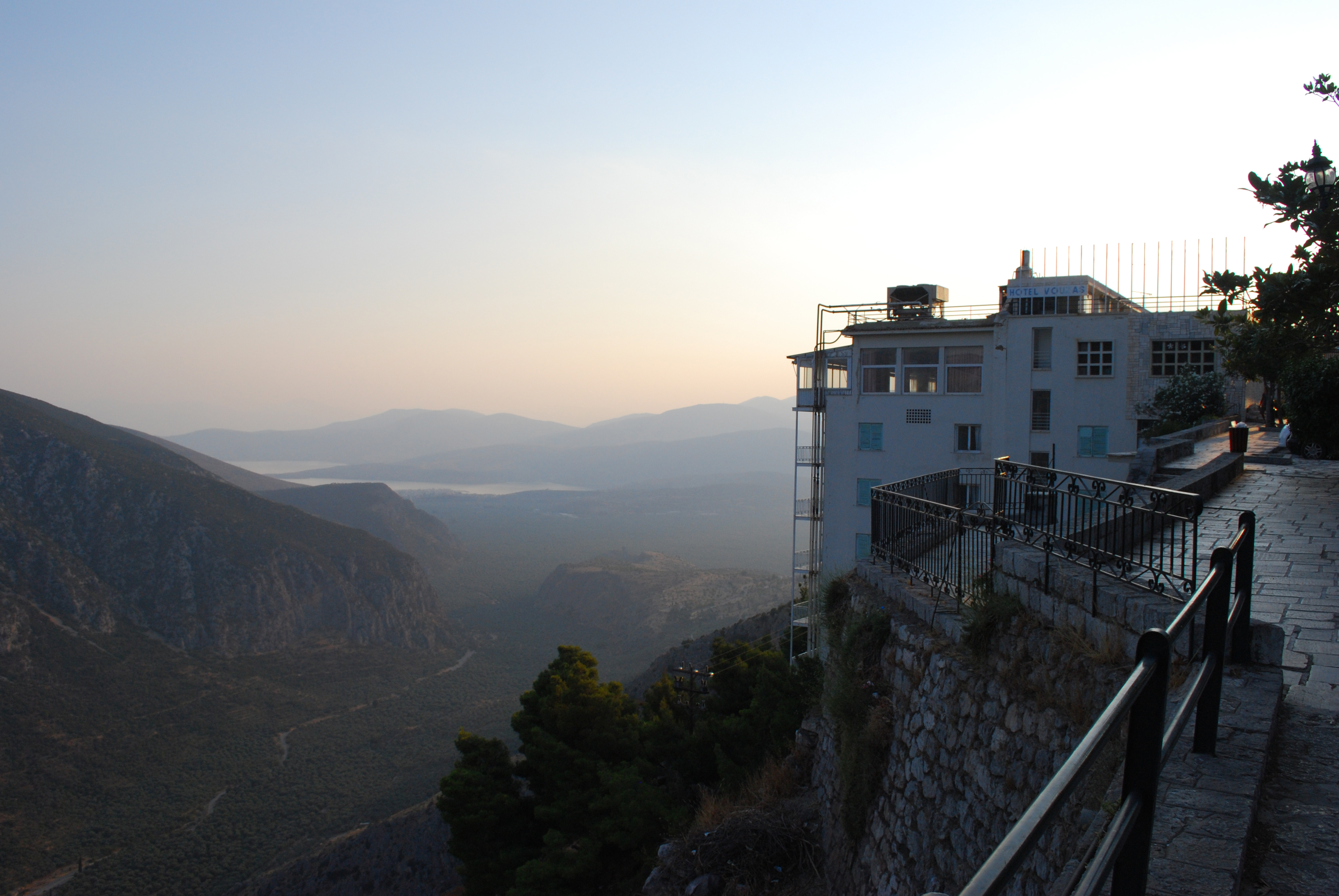
- Village of Delphi, Pleistos Valley and the Gulf of Corinth in the background

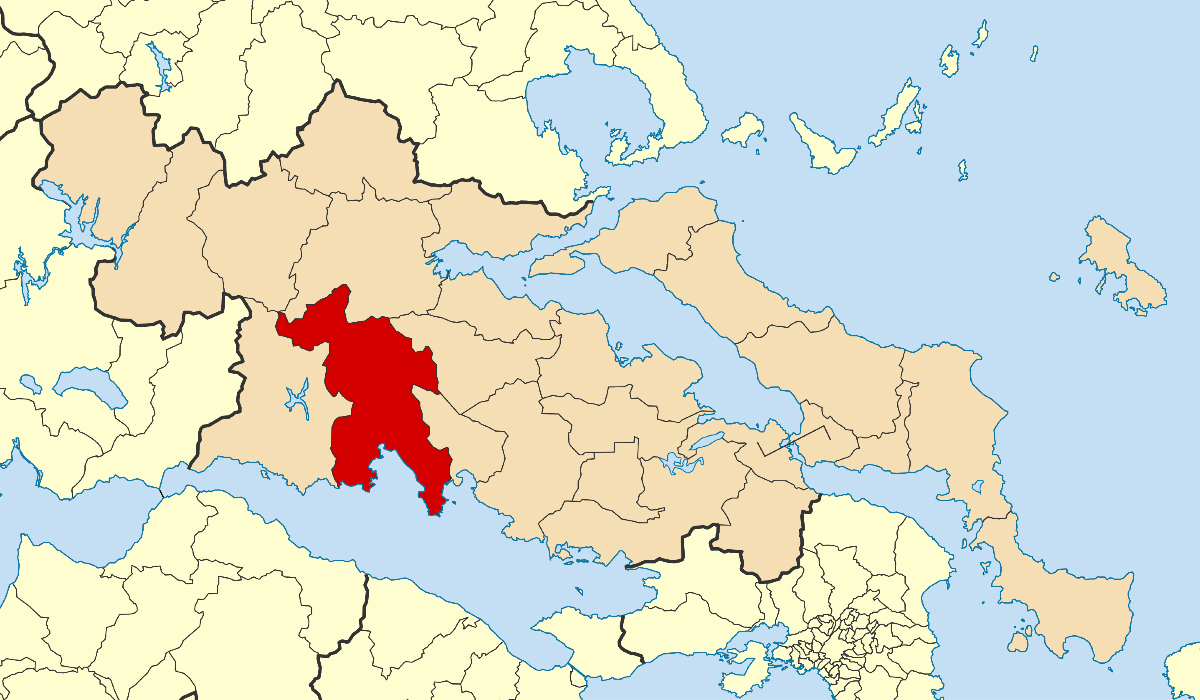

- Location within Greece
- Coordinates: 38°28′47″N 22°29′38″E
- Country: Greece
- Administrative region: Central Greece
- Regional unit: Phocis
- Village established: 1893 (133 years ago)

Government
  - Mayor: Panagiotis Tagkalis (since 2019)

Area
  - Municipality: 1,121.7 km^{2} (433.1 sq mi)
  - Municipal unit: 73.13 km^{2} (28.24 sq mi)
- Elevation: 632 m (2,073 ft)

Population (2021)
  - Municipality: 24,165
  - Density: 21.543/km^{2} (55.797/sq mi)
  - Municipal unit: 1,465
  - Municipal unit density: 20.03/km^{2} (51.88/sq mi)
  - Community: 867
- Time zone: UTC+2 (EET)
  - Summer (DST): UTC+3 (EEST)
- Vehicle registration: ΑΜ

Delphi (/ˈdɛlfaɪ/ or /ˈdɛlfi/; Greek: Δελφοί, [ðelˈfi]) is a town in Phocis, Greece, situated immediately west of the archaeological site of the same name. It was created as a home for the population of Kastri, which was relocated to allow for the excavation of the site of ancient Delphi. The importance of the twin locations grew to the point where Delphi has also been made the name of the modern-day municipality, which includes the communities of the Pleistos valley system as far south as the Gulf of Corinth. The name Delphi came from the Oracle of Delphi, which was anciently accepted as a purveyor of truth revealed by the god Apollo.

== Town ==
The twin sites are on Greek National Road 48 linking Amfissa with Livadeia. The town contains extensive facilities supporting the tourist trade at the ancient site. Like the ancient Sacred Precinct, the town preserves a vertical dimension by terracing the streets and buildings. The streets are narrow, and often one-way. The E4 European long distance path passes through the east end of the town. In addition to the archaeological interest, Delphi attracts tourists visiting the Parnassus Ski Center and the popular coastal towns of the region.

== History ==
Occupation of the site at Delphi can be traced back to the Neolithic period with extensive occupation and use beginning in the Mycenaean period (1600–1100 BC).

=== Ancient Delphi ===
Earlier myths include traditions that Pythia, or the Delphic oracle, already was the site of an important oracle in the pre-classical Greek world (as early as 1400 BC) and, rededicated from about 800 BC, when it served as the major site during classical times for the worship of the god Apollo.

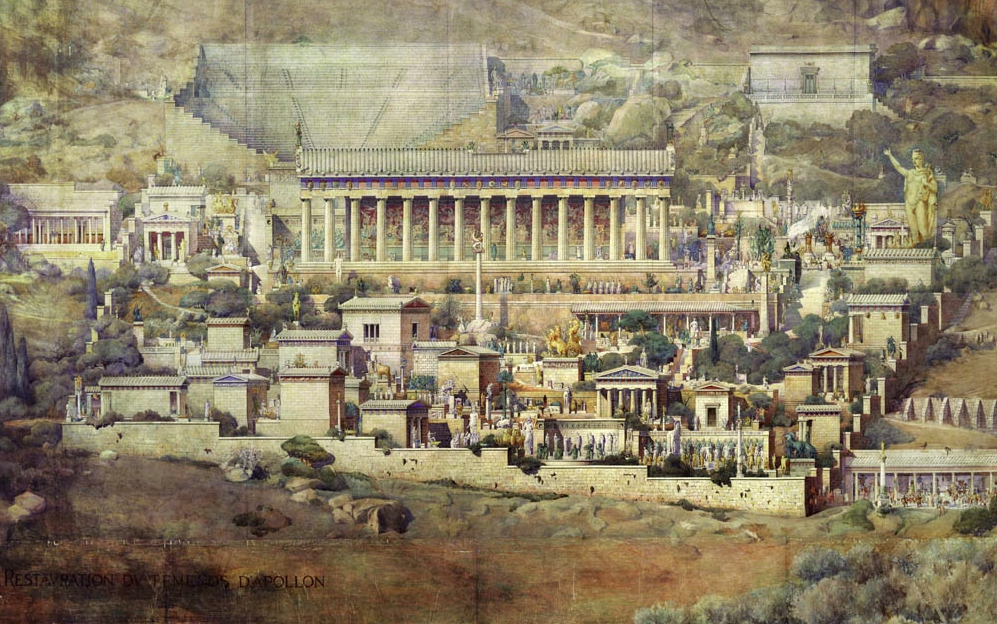
Speculative illustration of ancient Delphi by French architect Albert Tournaire.

Delphi was since ancient times a place of worship for Gaia, the mother goddess connected with fertility. The town started to gain pan-Hellenic relevance as both a shrine and an oracle in the 7th century BC. Initially under the control of Phocaean settlers based in nearby Kirra (currently Itea), Delphi was reclaimed by the Athenians during the First Sacred War (597–585 BC). The conflict resulted in the consolidation of the Amphictyonic League, which had both a military and a religious function revolving around the protection of the Temple of Apollo. This shrine was destroyed by fire in 548 BC and then fell under the control of the Alcmaeonids banned from Athens. In 449–448 BC, the Second Sacred War (fought in the wider context of the First Peloponnesian War between the Peloponnesian League led by Sparta and the Delian-Attic League led by Athens) resulted in the Phocians gaining control of Delphi and the management of the Pythian Games.

In 356 BC the Phocians under Philomelos captured and sacked Delphi, leading to the Third Sacred War (356–346 BC), which ended with the defeat of the former and the rise of Macedon under the reign of Philip II. This led to the Fourth Sacred War (339 BC), which culminated in the Battle of Chaeronea (338 BC) and the establishment of Macedonian rule over Greece. In Delphi, Macedonian rule was superseded by the Aetolians in 279 BC, when a Gallic invasion was repelled, and by the Romans in 191 BC. The site was sacked by Lucius Cornelius Sulla in 86 BC, during the Mithridatic Wars, and by Nero in 66 AD. Although subsequent Roman emperors of the Flavian dynasty contributed towards to the restoration of the site, it gradually lost importance. In the course of the 3rd century mystery cults became more popular than the traditional Greek pantheon. Christianity, which started as yet one more mystery cult, soon gained ground, and this eventually resulted in the persecution of pagans in the late Roman Empire. The anti-pagan legislation of the Flavian dynasty deprived ancient sanctuaries of their assets. The emperor Julian attempted to reverse this religious climate, yet his "pagan revival" was particularly short-lived. When the doctor Oreibasius visited the oracle of Delphi, in order to question the fate of paganism, he received a pessimistic answer:

Εἴπατε τῷ βασιλεῖ, χαμαὶ πέσε δαίδαλος αὐλά,

οὐκέτι Φοῖβος ἔχει καλύβην, οὐ μάντιδα δάφνην,

οὐ παγὰν λαλέουσαν, ἀπέσβετο καὶ λάλον ὕδωρ.

[Tell the king that the flute has fallen to the ground. Phoebus does not have a home any more, neither an oracular laurel, nor a speaking fountain, because the talking water has dried out.]

It was shut down during the persecution of pagans in the late Roman Empire by Theodosius I in 381 AD.

==== Amphictyonic Council ====
The Amphictyonic Council was a council of representatives from six Greek tribes that controlled Delphi and also the quadrennial Pythian Games. They met biannually and came from Thessaly and central Greece. Over time, the town of Delphi gained more control of itself and the council lost much of its influence.

==== The sacred precinct in the Iron Age ====
Excavation at Delphi, which was a post-Mycenaean settlement of the late 9th century, has uncovered artifacts increasing steadily in volume beginning with the last quarter of the 8th century BC. Pottery and bronze as well as tripod dedications continue in a steady stream, in contrast to Olympia. Neither the range of objects nor the presence of prestigious dedications proves that Delphi was a focus of attention for a wide range of worshippers, but the large quantity of valuable goods, found in no other mainland sanctuary, encourages that view.

Apollo's sacred precinct in Delphi was a Panhellenic Sanctuary, where every four years, starting in 586 BC athletes from all over the Greek world competed in the Pythian Games, one of the four Panhellenic Games, precursors of the Modern Olympics. The victors at Delphi were presented with a laurel crown (stephanos) which was ceremonially cut from a tree by a boy who re-enacted the slaying of the Python. (These competitions are also called stephantic games, after the crown.) Delphi was set apart from the other games sites because it hosted the mousikos agon, musical competitions.

These Pythian Games rank second among the four stephantic games chronologically and in importance. These games, though, were different from the games at Olympia in that they were not of such vast importance to the city of Delphi as the games at Olympia were to the area surrounding Olympia. Delphi would have been a renowned city regardless of whether it hosted these games; it had other attractions that led to it being labeled the "omphalos" (navel) of the earth, in other words, the centre of the world.

In the inner hestia (hearth) of the Temple of Apollo, an eternal flame burned. After the battle of Plataea, the Greek cities extinguished their fires and brought new fire from the hearth of Greece, at Delphi; in the foundation stories of several Greek colonies, the founding colonists were first dedicated at Delphi.

=== Abandonment and rediscovery ===
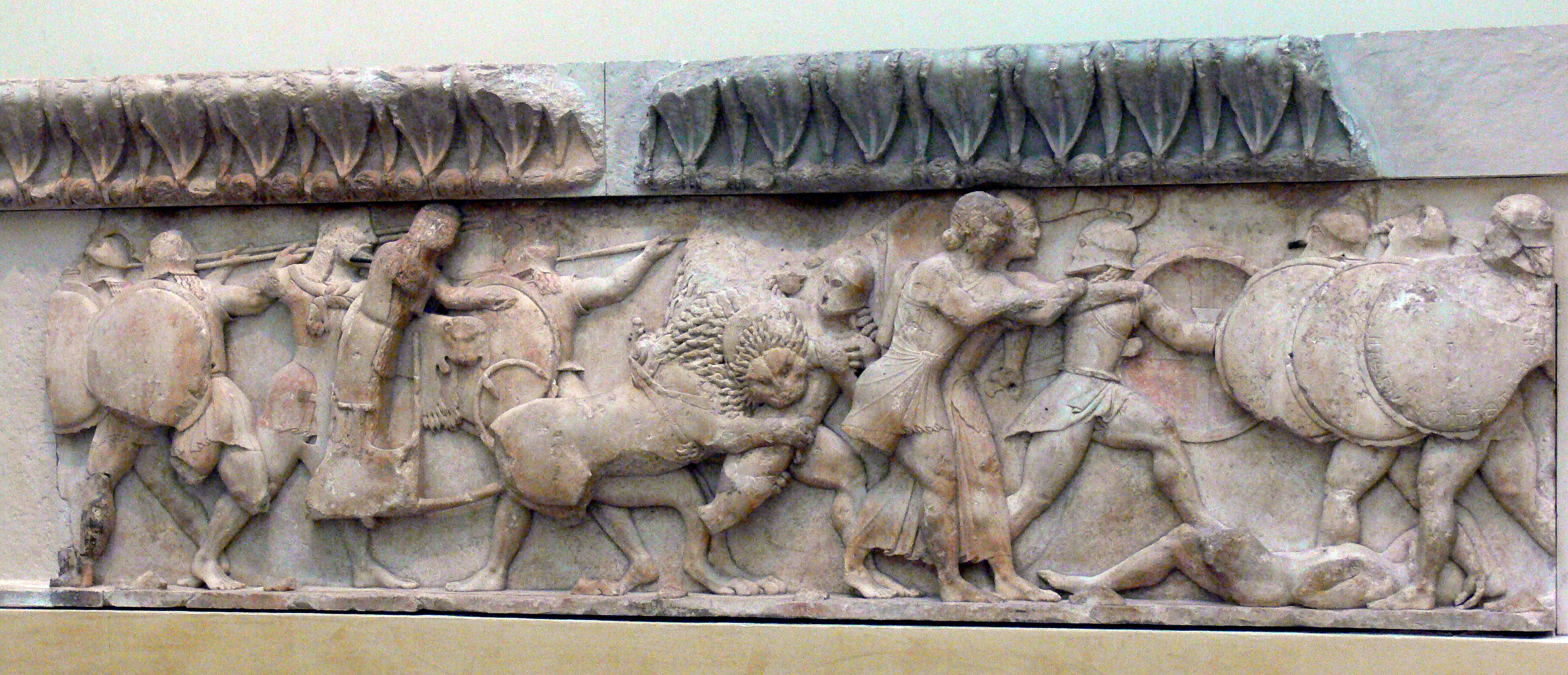
Section of the frieze from the Treasury of the Siphnians, now in the museum.

The Ottomans finalized their domination over Phocis and Delphi in about 1410 CE. Delphi itself remained almost uninhabited for centuries. It seems that one of the first buildings of the early modern era was the monastery of the Dormition of Mary or of Panagia (the Mother of God) built above the ancient gymnasium at Delphi. It must have been towards the end of the 15th or in the 16th century that a settlement started forming there, which eventually ended up forming the village of Kastri.

=== Ottoman period and Middle Ages ===
Ottoman Delphi gradually began to be investigated. The first Westerner to describe the remains in Delphi was Ciriaco de' Pizzicolli (Cyriacus of Ancona), a 15th-century merchant turned diplomat and antiquarian. He visited Delphi in March 1436 and remained there for six days. He recorded all the visible archaeological remains based on Pausanias for identification. He described the stadium and the theatre at that date as well as some freestanding pieces of sculpture. He also recorded several inscriptions, most of which are now lost. His identifications however were not always correct: for example he described a round building he saw as the temple of Apollo while this was simply the base of the Argives' ex-voto. A severe earthquake in 1500 caused much damage. In the Middle Ages a town called Kastri was rebuilt on the archaeological site. The residents had used the marble columns and structures as support beams and roofs for their improvised houses, a usual way of rebuilding towns that were partially or totally destroyed, especially after the earthquake in 1580, which demolished several towns in Phocis.

=== Modern period ===
In 1893 archaeologists from the École française d'Athènes finally located the actual site of ancient Delphi and the village was moved to a new location, west of the site of the temples.

Delphi is home to the European Cultural Centre of Delphi, which is hosting the Delphi Economic Forum, an annual international conference about finance, politics and science, with notable speakers such as world leaders.

== Municipality ==
The municipality Delphi was formed at the 2011 local government reform by the merger of the following 8 former municipalities, that became municipal units:

- Amfissa
- Delphi
- Desfina
- Galaxidi
- Gravia
- Itea
- Kallieis
- Parnassos

The municipality has an area of 1121.671 km^{2}, the municipal unit 73.126 km^{2}. The administrative seat of the municipality is in the largest town, Amfissa. The total population of the municipality is 32,263. The town Delphi has a population of 2,373 people while the population of the municipal unit of Delphi, including Chrisso (ancient Krissa), is 3,511.

== See also ==
- Ancient Delphi
- Franz Weber (activist) - made an honorary citizen of Delphi in 1997
- List of traditional Greek place names
- Delphi Sculpture Park

== Gallery ==
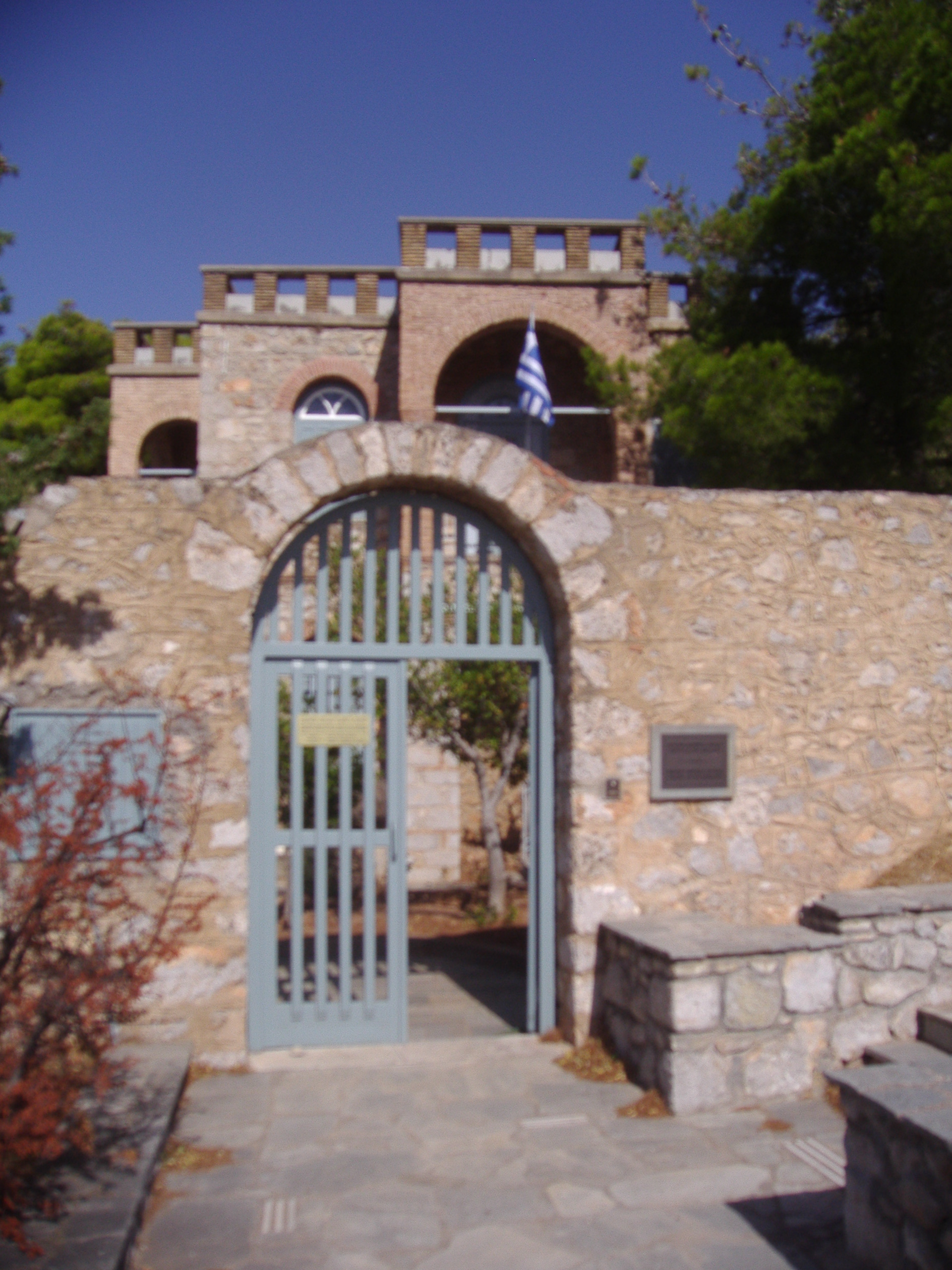
House of Angelos Sikelianos

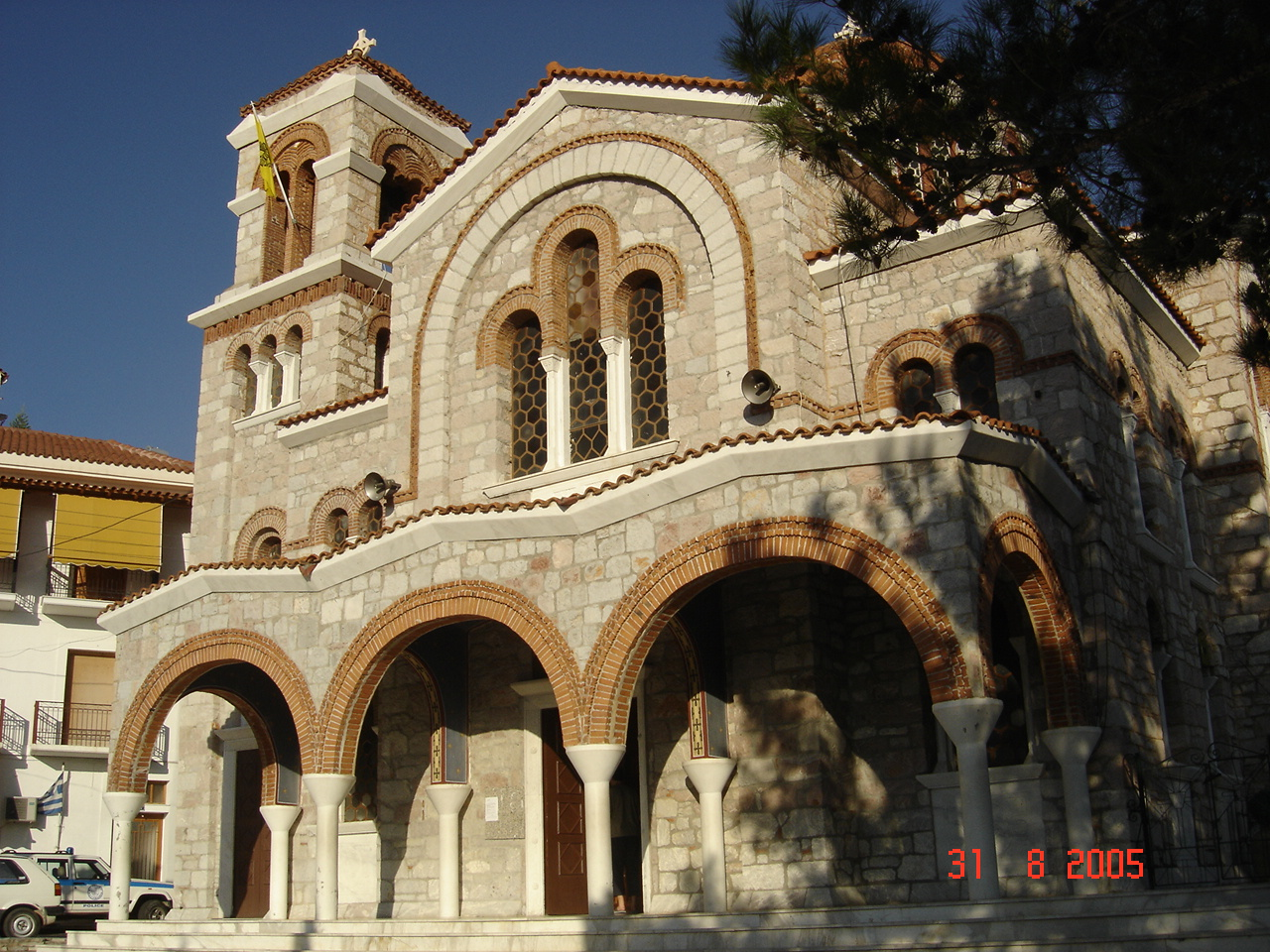
Saint Nicolas church

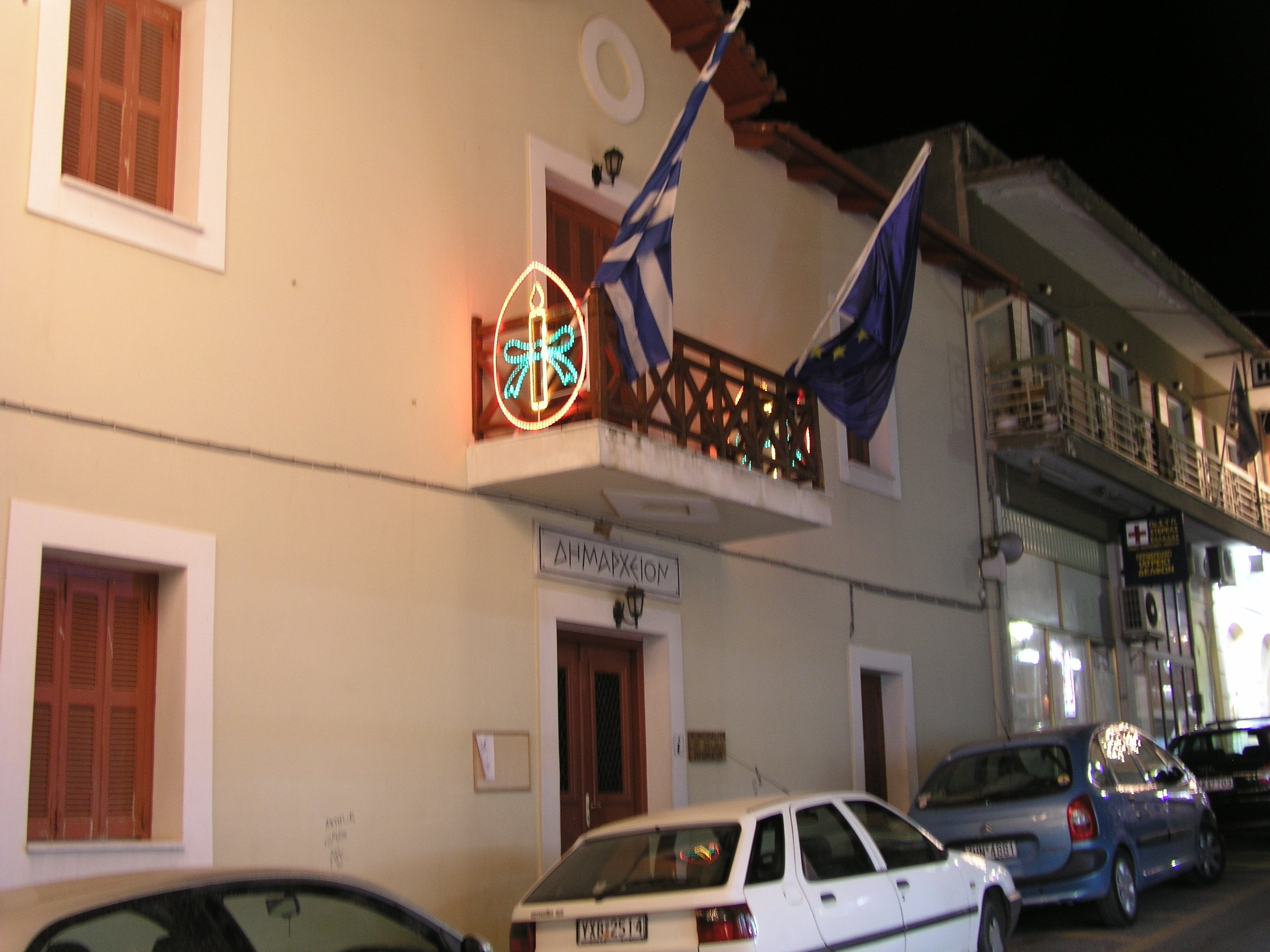
Town hall

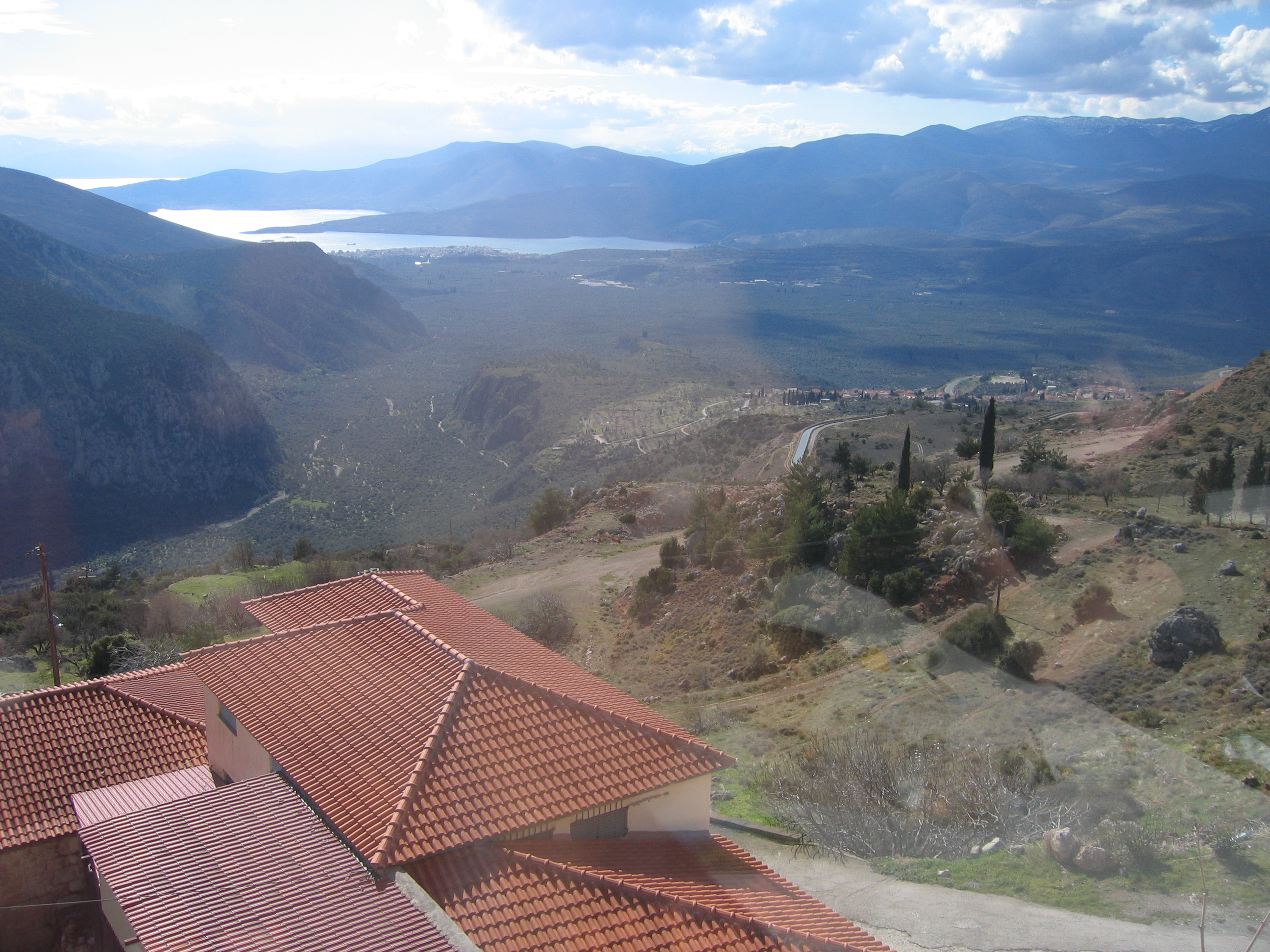
Building and view into valley

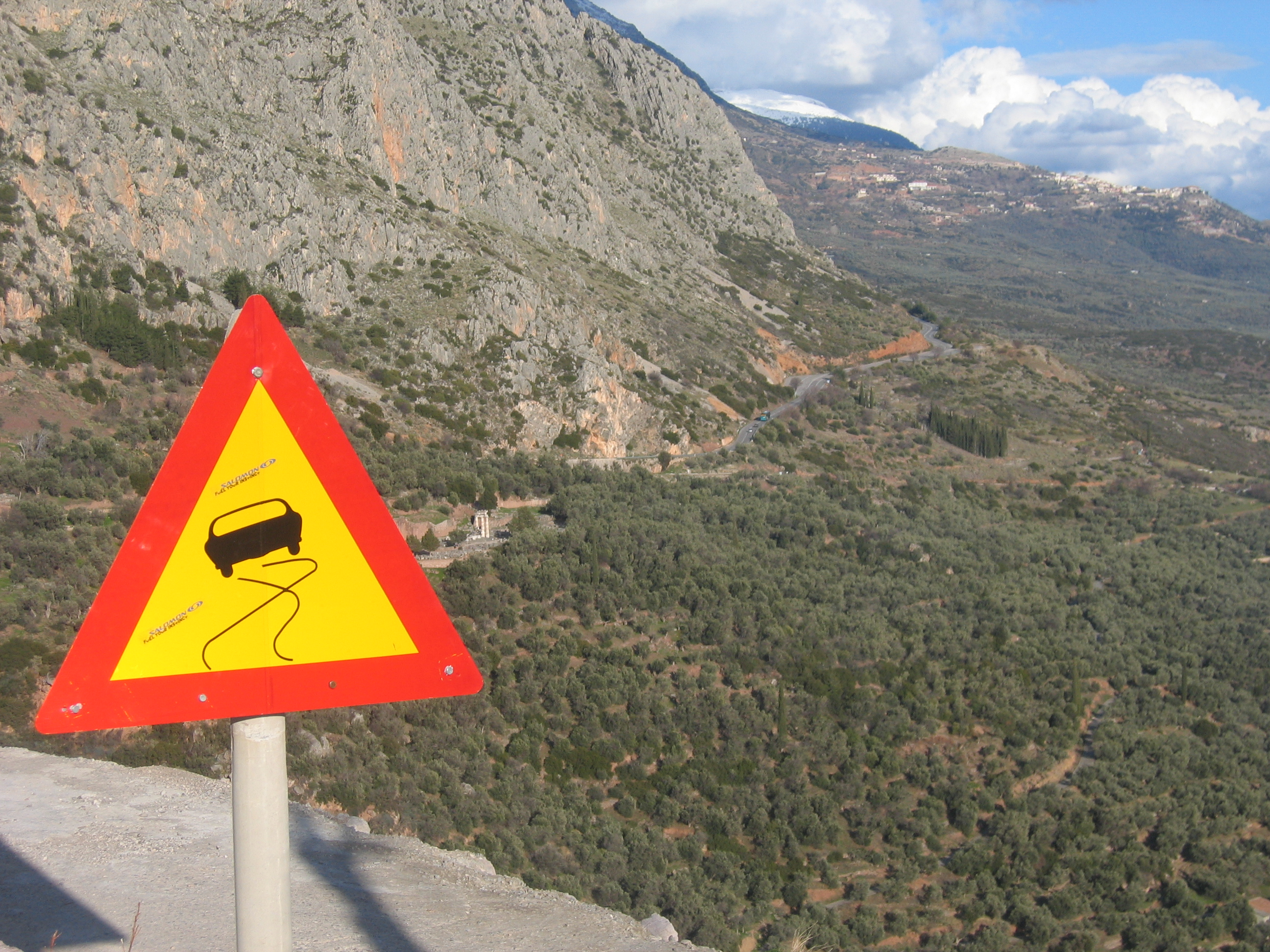
Valley and road sign

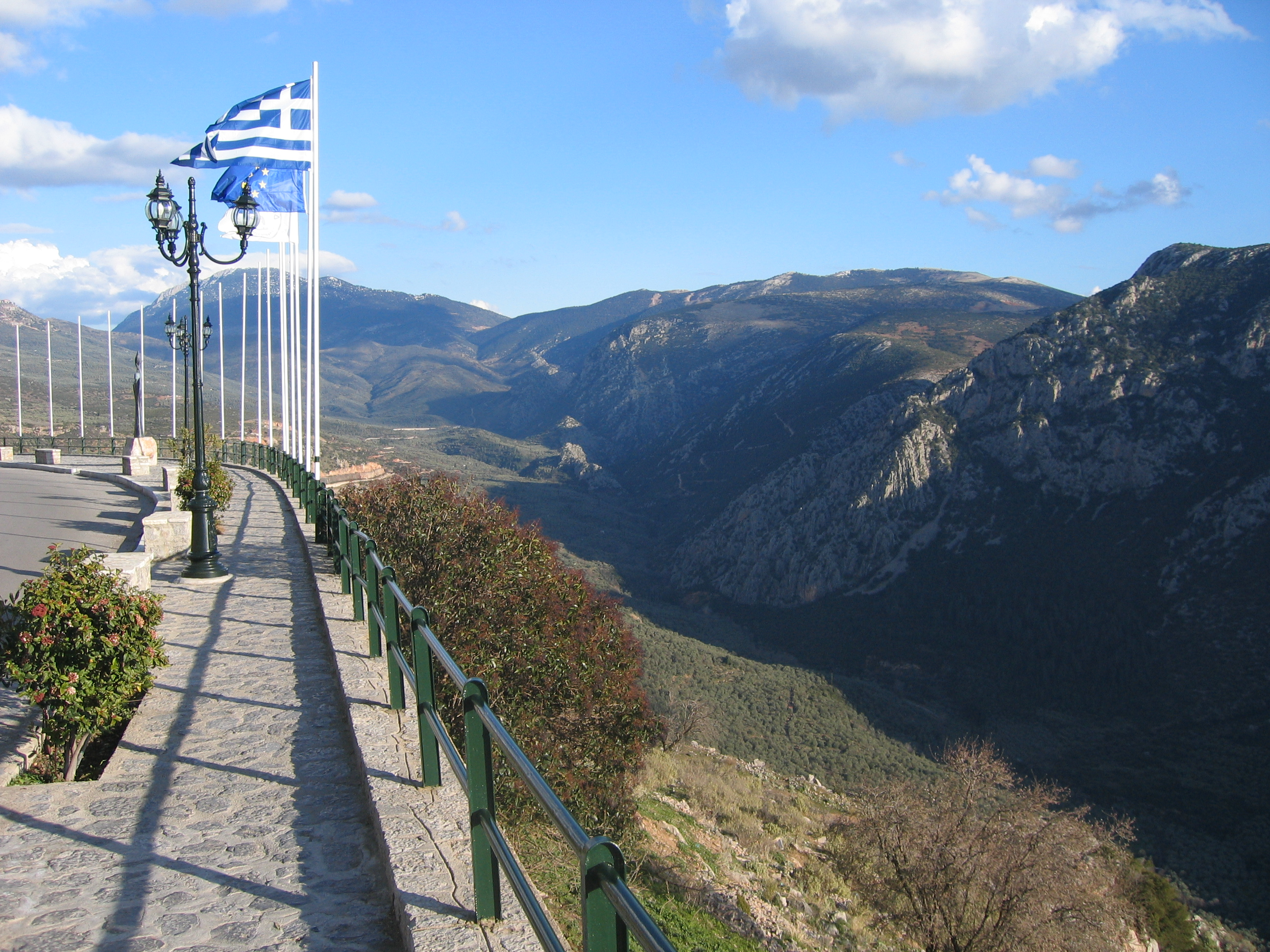
Entrance flags

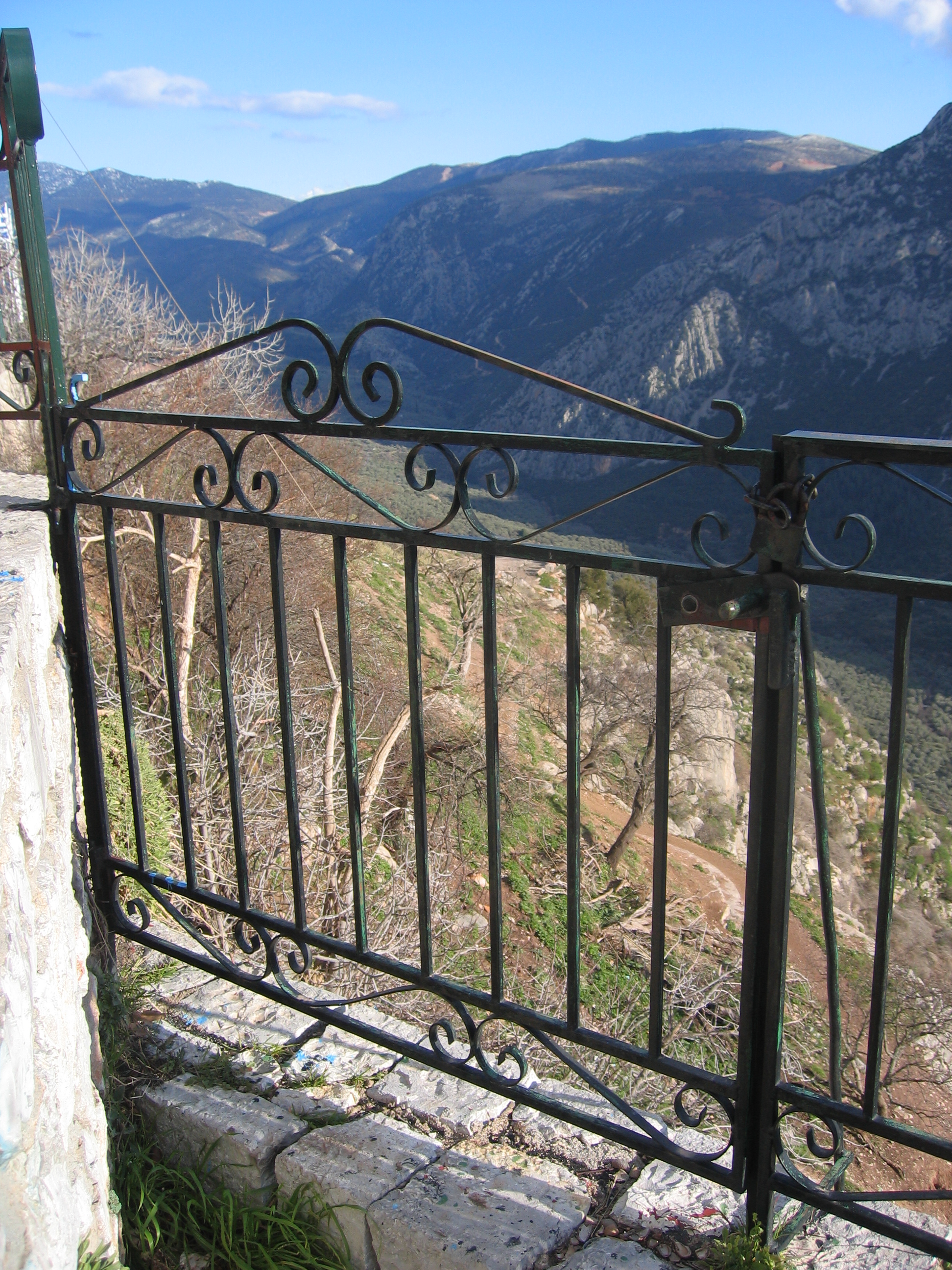
Fence and valley

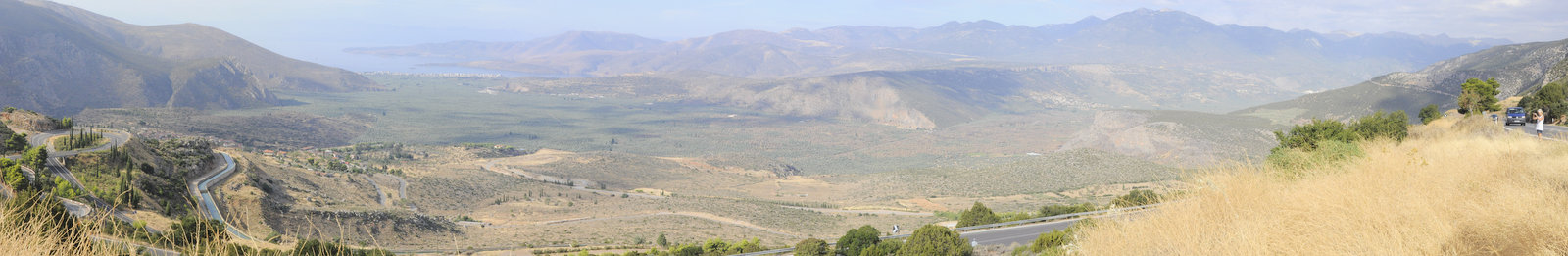
Olive trees and water aqueduct in Delphi valley
