= Kastri, Phocis =

Abandoned village in Greece

Kastri Village
- Καστρί (Greek)
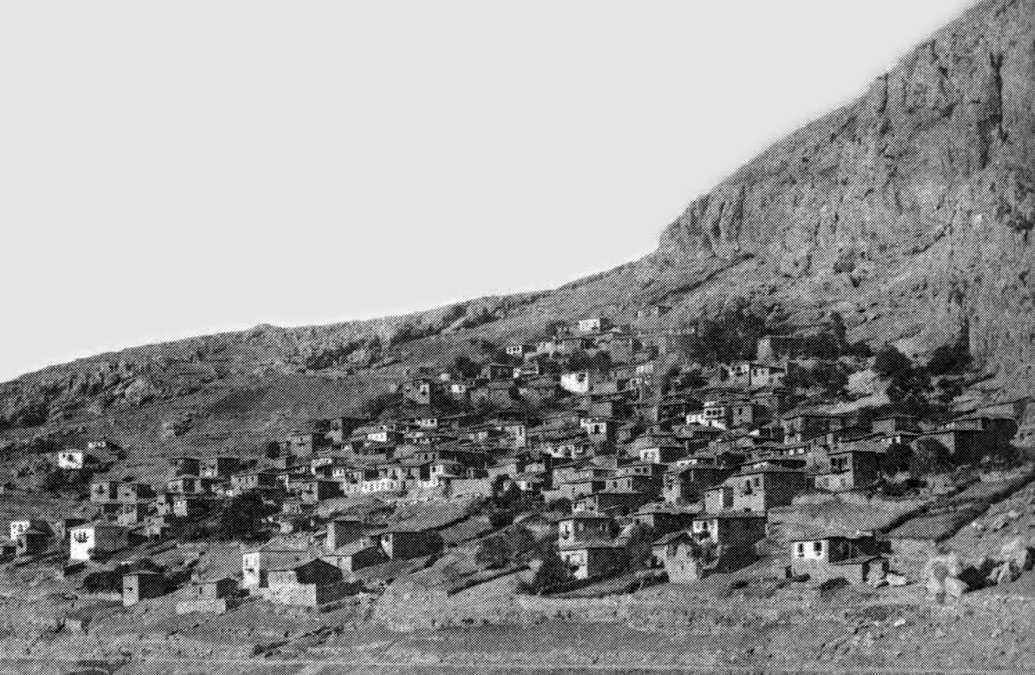
- Village of Kastri before the Delphi excavation
- Interactive map of Kastri Village
- 38.4812634°N 22.5016871°E
- Cultures: Medieval Greece
- Location: Phocis, Greece
- Region: Central Greece

History
- Abandoned: 1893

Site notes
- Archaeologists: William Martin Leake

Kastri was a medieval village in Greece, which was formed above the ruins of the ancient site of Delphi. The local villagers partly used the ruins in the construction of their village. The village was destroyed during the exploratory archaeological digging for the ancient site of Delphi in late 19th century.

== History ==
The temple and statues at Delphi were destroyed under the rule of Theodosius I in c. 390 AD. The village of Kastri was built on top of the ruins using marble from destroyed buildings and, eventually, the precise location of Delphi was lost.

George Wheler and Jacques Spon rediscovered the site using an old description from Pausanias, and published their findings in 1682. Other explorers noted the remains of the ancient temple in Kastri, including Colonel William Martin Leake who visited the site in 1802 and 1806. In 1838, Greek scholars suggested that the village be moved to allow excavation of the site. In 1891, the French Archaeological School of Athens pledged a sum of money to facilitate the removal of the villagers to the site of the modern town of Delphi and, in return, was granted a ten-year concession to excavate the site. The village was estimated to consist of about one hundred homes and two hundred inhabitants.

During the excavation, the French Archaeologists removed vast quantities of soil from landslides that had covered the major buildings and structures of Delphi.

The new village that was created for the inhabitants of Kastri is now part of modern-day Delphi, and the name is not used locally anymore.

== See also ==
- Delphi Archaeological Museum
