= Chrisso, Phocis =

Chrisso Χρισσό
- Community
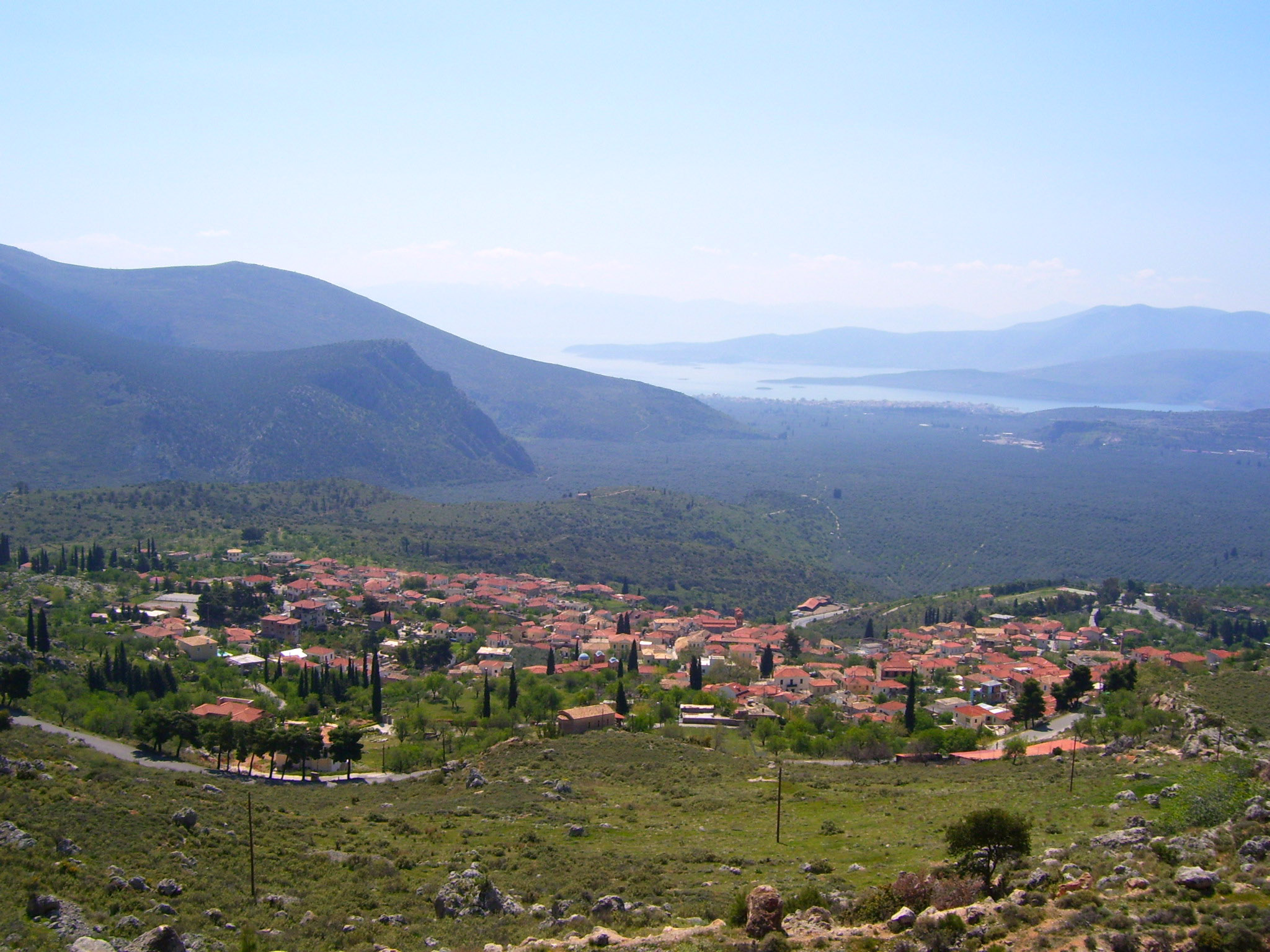
- Chrisso

- Location within Greece
- Coordinates: 38°28′N 22°28′E
- Country: Greece
- Administrative region: Central Greece
- Regional unit: Phocis
- Municipality: Delphi
- Municipal unit: Delphi

Population (2021)
  - Community: 598
- Time zone: UTC+2 (EET)
  - Summer (DST): UTC+3 (EEST)
- Postal code: 330 54
- Area code: 22650
- Vehicle registration: AM

Chrisso (Greek: Χρισσό) is a village in Phocis, Greece. The modern village sits north of the ancient town of Crissa, a powerful city-state of ancient Greece which gave its name to the Crissaean plain and the Crissaean Gulf and lies in the southwestern foothills of Mount Parnassus. Chrisso is 2 km southwest of Delphi, 10 km southeast of Amfissa and 6 km northeast of Itea. The Greek National Road 48 (Nafpaktos - Delphi - Livadeia) passes west of the village. Chrisso belongs to the municipality of Delphi.

== Historical population ==
Year	Population
1981	1,076
1991	948
2001	1,021
2011	743
2021	598

== History ==
The town is first mentioned in Homer's Catalog of Ships, as a Phoecean settlement that participated in Trojan War (ca. 12th-13th century B.C.). The rubble from the ancient wall of Krissa lies in the modern Stefani hill. The ancient city was devastated by Amphictiones in the war which lasted from around 600 BC and 590 BC. In the Crisaean fields, an ancient hippodrome is founded.

== Notable people ==
- Strophilus of Crissa
- Dimitrios Psarros (1893–1944), army officer & resistance leader
