= Itea, Phocis =

Town in Central Greece

Itea Ιτέα
- Municipal unit
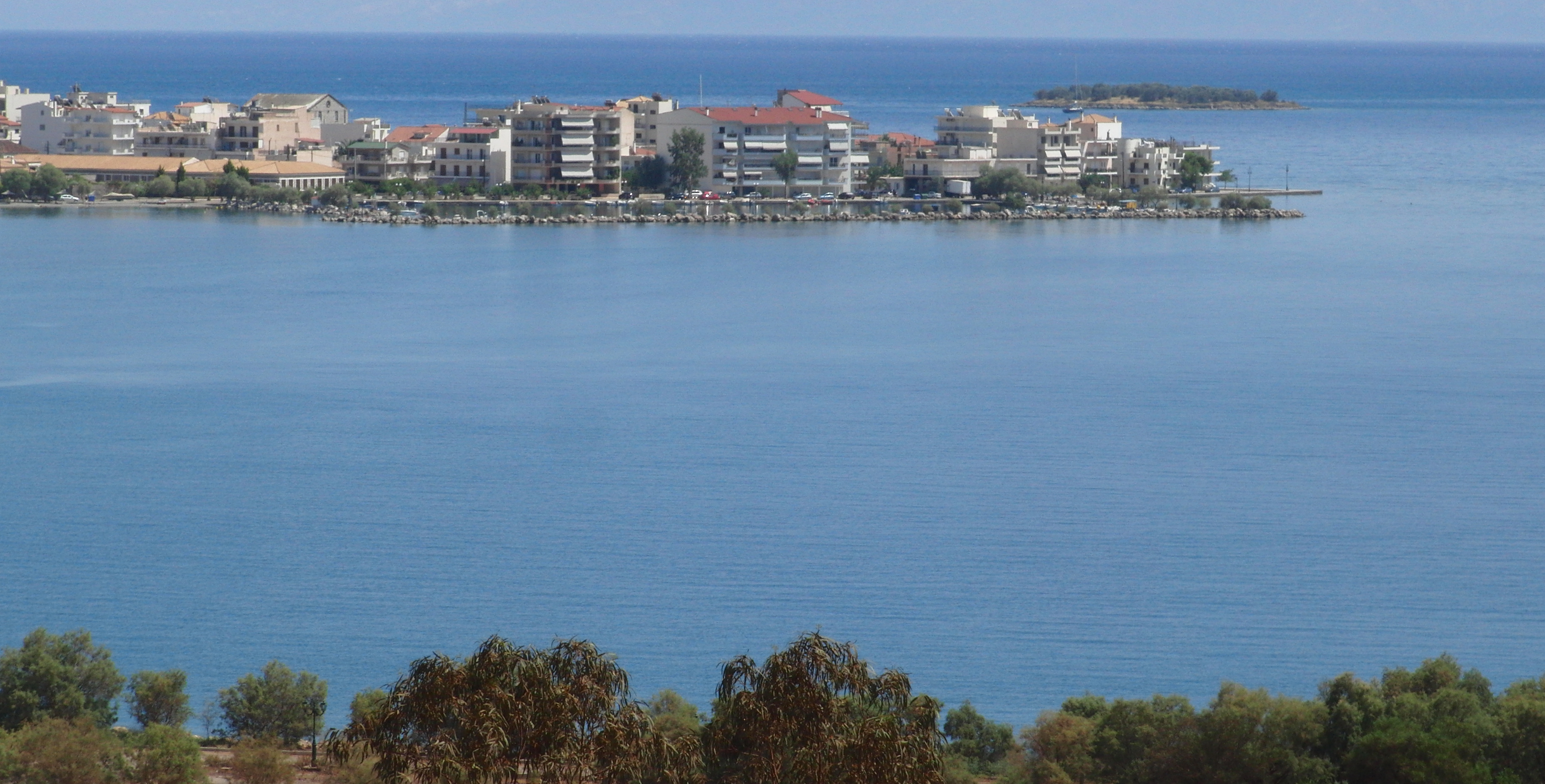

- Location within the regional unit

- Location within Greece
- Coordinates: 38°26′N 22°25.5′E
- Country: Greece
- Administrative region: Central Greece
- Regional unit: Phocis
- Municipality: Delphi

Area
  - Municipal unit: 26.351 km^{2} (10.174 sq mi)
  - Community: 6.305 km^{2} (2.434 sq mi)
- Highest elevation: 10 m (33 ft)
- Lowest elevation: 2 m (6.6 ft)

Population (2021)
  - Municipal unit: 6,050
  - Municipal unit density: 230/km^{2} (595/sq mi)
  - Community: 4,546
  - Community density: 721.0/km^{2} (1,867/sq mi)
- Time zone: UTC+2 (EET)
  - Summer (DST): UTC+3 (EEST)
- Postal code: 332 00
- Area code: +30-2265
- Vehicle registration: ΑΜ

Itea (Greek: Ιτέα meaning willow), is a town and a former municipality in the southeastern part of Phocis, Greece. Since 2011 local government reforms made Itea a municipal unit of the municipality of Delphi.

== Administrative division ==
The municipal unit Itea consists of the communities Itea, Kirra and Tritaia.

== Geography ==
Itea is situated on the north coast of the Gulf of Iteas named after it, a northward projection of the Gulf of Corinth. Itea is 2 km (1 mi) west of Kirra, 8 km (5 mi) southwest of Delphi, 11 km (7 mi) south of Amfissa and 52 km (32 mi) east of Naupactus. The Greek National Road 48 connects Itea with Naupactus, Delphi and Livadeia, the Greek National Road 27 with Amfissa and Lamia. The community of Itea covers an area of 6.305 km^{2} (2.434 sq mi) while the municipal unit covers an area of 26.351 km^{2} (10.174 sq mi).

== Historical population ==
| Year | Town population | Municipality population |
|---|---|---|
| 1981 | 4,438 | - |
| 1991 | 4,303 | 5,592 |
| 2001 | 4,627 | 5,943 |
| 2011 | 4,362 | 5,888 |
| 2021 | 4,546 | 6,050 |

== Gallery ==
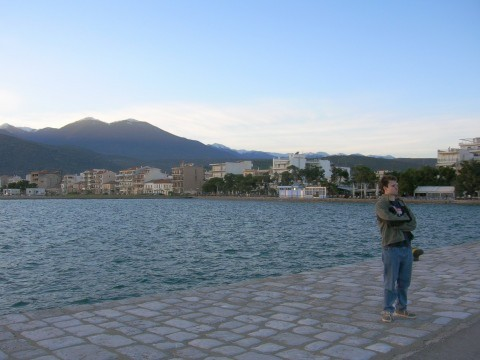
The city of Itea in March 2006 from the view of one of its docks.

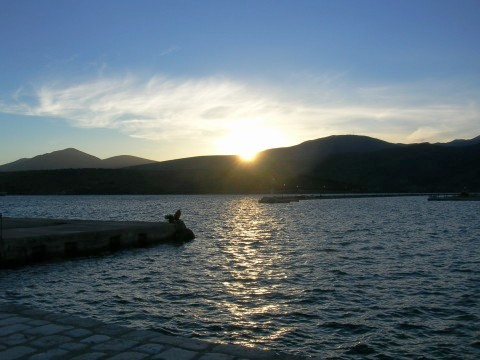
Sunset from a dock in Itea, Greece.

== See also ==
- List of settlements in Phocis
