= Greek National Road 38 =

Trunk road in Greece

Coordinates: 38.9075°N 21.8354°E

National Road 38
- Εθνική Οδός 38
- Route of the EO38 road, in blue

Route information
- Part of E952 (Lamia–Agrinio)
- Length: 211.1 km (131.2 mi)
- Existed: 9 July 1963–present

Major junctions
- East end: Lamia
- West end: Thermo

Location
- Country: Greece
- Regions: Central Greece; Western Greece
- Primary destinations: Lamia; Karpenisi; Agrinio; Thermo

Highway system
- Highways in Greece; Motorways; National roads
← EO36	→ EO39

Greek National Road 38 (Greek: Εθνική Οδός 38), abbreviated as the EO38, is a national road in central and western Greece. It connects the city of Lamia with Thermo, via Agrinio and Karpenisi. It passes through the regional units of Aetolia-Acarnania, Evrytania and Phthiotis. The EO38 between Agrinio and Lamia coincides with the European route E952.

== Route ==
The western end of the National Road is in the small town Thermo, in Aetolia-Acarnania. It first runs west along the northern shore of Lake Trichonida. It turns north at Agrinio, and continues through the sparsely populated mountains of northeastern Aetolia-Acarnania. The highway crosses the Kremasta reservoir by the Episkopi bridge. It continues east through the mountainous Agrafa area, part of the Pindus mountains. It passes through Karpenisi, the capital town of Evrytania. East of Karpenisi, it passes through a tunnel under the Tymfristos mountain and enters the Spercheios valley. It follows the river Spercheios downstream, through Makrakomi and Leianokladi, and ends in Lamia. The National Road 38 passes through the following places:

- Thermo
- Paravola
- Agrinio
- Agios Vlasios
- Episkopi
- Fragkista
- Kalesmeno
- Karpenisi
- Tymfristos
- Agios Georgios Tymfristou
- Makrakomi
- Leianokladi
- Lamia

== History ==
Ministerial Decision G25871 of 9 July 1963 created the EO38 from the old EO21 and EO78, both of which existed by royal decree from 1955 until 1963: the old EO21 followed the same route as the current EO38 between Lamia and Agrinio, while the old EO78 followed the same route between Agrinio and Thermo.
