= Dikastro =

Dikastro Δίκαστρο
- Community
- Location within Greece
- Coordinates: 38°59′31″N 21°56′31″E
- Country: Greece
- Administrative region: Central Greece
- Regional unit: Phthiotis
- Municipality: Makrakomi
- Municipal unit: Agios Georgios Tymfristou

Population (2021)
  - Community: 130
- Time zone: UTC+2 (EET)
  - Summer (DST): UTC+3 (EEST)

Dikastro (Greek: Δίκαστρο), meaning "two castles", is a small village in the northwest of Phthiotis in Central Greece, very close to the borders with Evrytania and Karditsa. Built on the verdant rocky landscape between Mounts Tymfristos and Mavrorachi, it is located 35 km away from Karpenisi, 61 km from Lamia and 275 km from Athens. It stands at an altitude of 850m (central square) and comprises two settlements, separated by creek Dikastriotis, one of the main streams flowing onto the river Spercheios.
