= Diopatra (mythology) =

Figure in Greek mythology

In Greek mythology, Diopatra (Ancient Greek: Διοπατρη Diopatrê) was a naiad of Mount Othrys and one of the Spercheides. She was the daughter of the river-god Spercheus and the naiad Deino. As recounted by Cerambus, when the god Poseidon fell in love with Diopatre, the god transformed her sisters into poplars in order to ravish the girl; some nymphs, outraged by the tale and other rumours he spread about themselves, turned Cerambus into a beetle. Diopatra's name means "divine family" which came from dion and patra.
