= Pitsiota =

Village in Greece

Pitsiota Πιτσιωτά
- Community
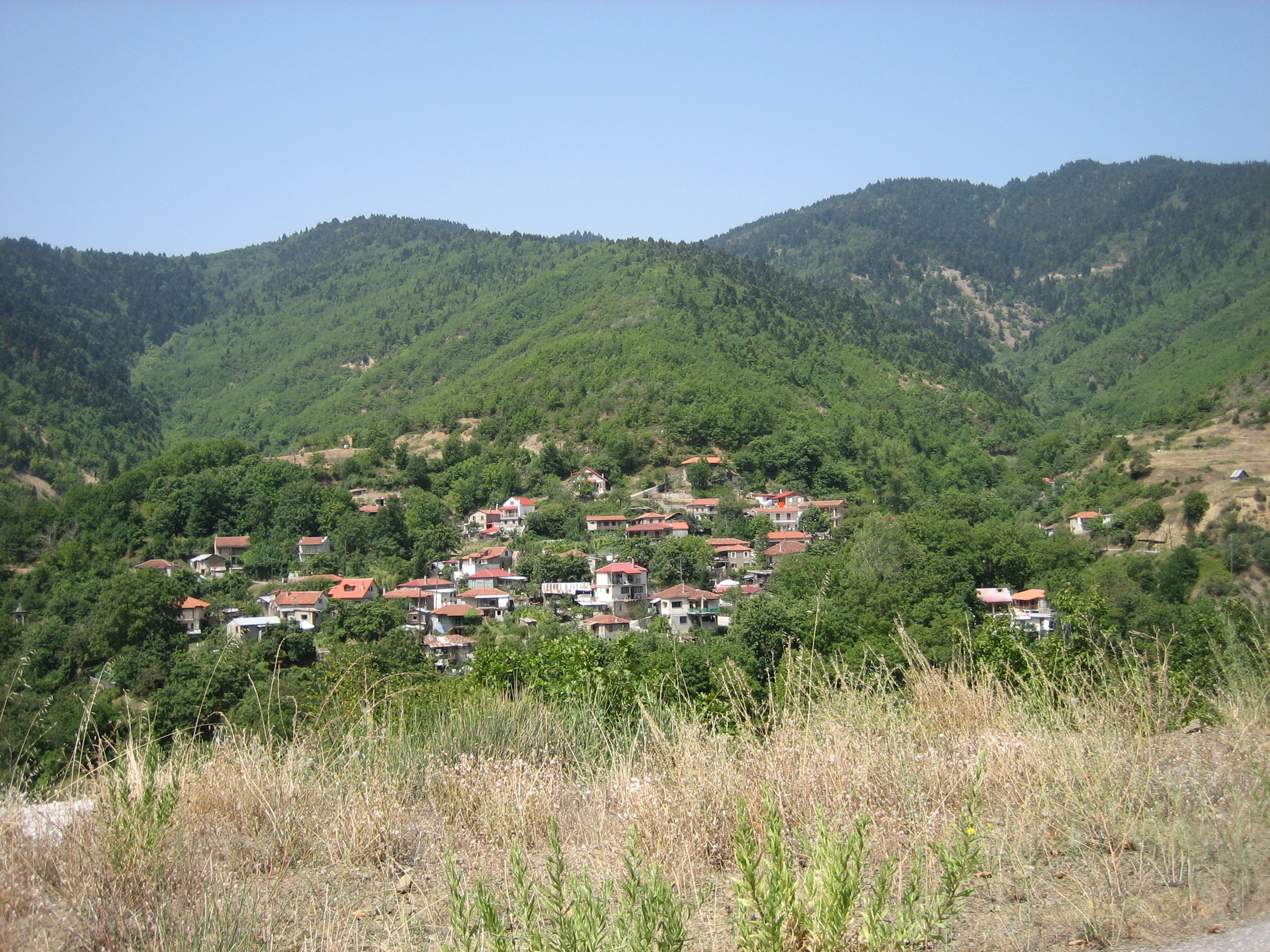
- The village with in the background the peak Bakakas of the mountain range Lykomnimata (=Wolftombs)

- Location within Greece
- Coordinates: 39°01′N 21°54′E
- Country: Greece
- Administrative region: Central Greece
- Regional unit: Phthiotis
- Municipality: Makrakomi
- Municipal unit: Agios Georgios Tymfristou

Population (2021)
  - Community: 43
- Time zone: UTC+2 (EET)
  - Summer (DST): UTC+3 (EEST)

Pitsiota is a village in the municipal unit of Agios Georgios Tymfristou, Phthiotis, Greece, northwest of Lamia. It is in the northwestern part of Phthiotis and very close to the borders of Evrytania and Karditsa regional units. Pitsiota's altitude is 780 m (2,560 ft). Nearby villages are Palaiokastro, Dikastro and Perivlepto.

== Climate ==
The average annual temperature in Pitsiota, fluctuates between 9.2 and 15.0 °C (48.6 and 59.0 °F). In Pitsiota there have also been observed very low minimum temperatures which can reach down to −14 °C (7 °F). January is the coldest month and July is the warmest. Autumn is warmer than Spring as well as in all Greek area. After the third week of May, the invasion of the warm season is intense.

== History ==
Without some specific historical reports, the age of the village has been calculated and found to exceed 500 years, since it had already been constituted before the Turkish slavery (1453). Its early inhabitants went there, from Evrytania, Agrinio, Trikala, from the villages of Fthiotida, or from Agrafa mountains (soldiers during the Turkish slavery, who served the Greek post, which had been later recast to the chapel of Saint Paraskevi). The highest number of inhabitants that has been recorded is about 430 in the late 19th century.

In modern age, an abandonment of the village started, as shown in the latest census. However, during summer seasons, it gets again some life, and can be an escape from the city routine. This happens because the village is built in the southern banks of the beautiful and verdant mountain "Lykomnimata", which is placed near the Tymphristos mountain complex.

One of the World Rally Championship's-Rally Acropolis- tracks passes through few kilometers from Pitsiota.

== Demographic Data ==
Population according to the census

- 1928: 283 hab.
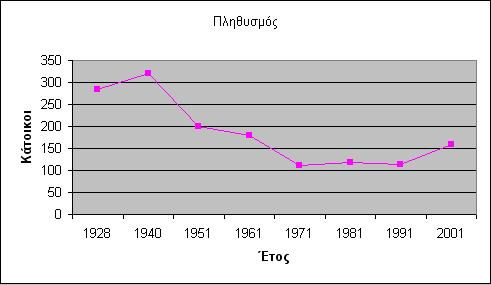
  Diagram showing the evolution of Pisiota's population.
- 1940: 321 hab.
- 1951: 201 hab.
- 1961: 180 hab.
- 1971: 111 hab.
- 1981: 118 hab.
- 1991: 114 hab.
- 2001: 158 hab.
- 2011: 114 hab.
- 2021: 43 hab.

Urbanization, influenced Pitsiota as it did in all Greek villages in the 1960s according to the upper data. The present population of the village consists almost wholly of aged people, above 70 years old. The Winters Pitsiota is emptying, and its only inhabitants are about 8-10 aged couples. However, in the summer the population can reach 200 of all ages. Official data of 2001 showed also that average in Pitsiota stays at "37 women and 38 men".
