= Dimitrios Holevas =

- Δημήτριος Χολέβας
- Photo of Papa-Holevas during his time with ELAS c. 1943/44
- Born: 26 January 1907; Tsouka, Phthiotis, Kingdom of Greece
- Died: 16 July 2001 (aged 94)
- Education: University of Athens; University of Thessaloniki
- Children: 5
- Military career
- Allegiance: EAM
- Branch: ELAS
- Service years: 1942–44
- Nicknames: Papa-Holevas; Παπαχολέβας; Papaflessas; Παπαφλέσσας
- Conflicts: World War II; Greek Resistance

Protopresbyter Dimitrios Holevas (Greek: Δημήτριος Χολέβας; 26 January 1907 – 16 July 2001), more commonly known as Papa-Holevas (Παπαχολέβας, "Father Holevas"), was a Greek Orthodox priest who was a notable member of the Greek People's Liberation Army (ELAS), set up by the National Liberation Front (EAM), a communist resistance movement against the Axis occupation of Greece during World War II.

Holevas was born on 26 January 1907 in Tsouka (a village in Phthiotis), and grew up in Makrakomi. He studied Literature and Archaeology at the University of Athens and the University of Thessaloniki. In 1938 he was ordained a priest in Lamia. He joined ELAS in 1942, with the nom de guerre of "Papaflessas". He became military priest of ELAS' 13th Division, and later became a deputy in the EAM-sponsored parliament of the PEEA. In 1943, he organized a council of priests at Spercheiada. He also founded the Pan-clerical Union of Greece, which came to number more than half of the priests of that era, and was elected as its General Secretary.

After the end of the war, he was persecuted for his support of ELAS: the Synodal Court suspended him from the clergy for three years, and in 1947 he was sent into internal exile in Ikaria. As a philologist and a priest he taught in schools in Lamia, Lavrion, Leros, Archangelos in Rhodes and Nikaia. In 2001 he was honoured by the Holy Synod of the Church of Greece with the Gold Cross of St Paul for his activity during the Resistance.

He died on 16 July 2001. He was married and had five children.

== Sources ==
- Κηδεύεται σήμερα ο παπα-αντάρτης (in Greek). Ta Nea. 20 July 2001. Archived from the original on 9 April 2011.
- Μνημόσυνο του Παπαχολέβα (in Greek). Rizospastis. 28 August 2001. Archived from the original on 24 July 2011.
- Έφυγε ο ανταρτόπαπας (in Greek). Ta Nea. 19 July 2001. Archived from the original on 2 October 2011.
