= Thanasis Pafilis =

Greek politician (born 1954)

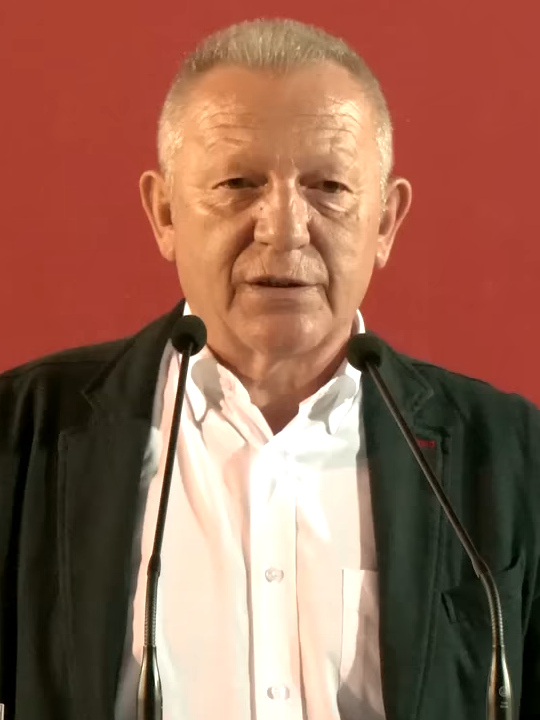
- Born: Athanasios Pafilis; 8 November 1954 (age 71); Pitsio of Phtiotida, Greece
- Education: Aristotle University of Thessaloniki
- Occupation: Member of the Hellenic Parliament
- Organization: World Peace Council
- Title: General Secretary of the World Peace Council
- Political party: Communist Party of Greece

Athanasios Pafilis (Greek: Αθανάσιος Παφίλης) (born 8 November 1954) is a Greek communist politician, member of the Hellenic Parliament and member of the central committee of the Communist Party of Greece. He is also the General Secretary of the World Peace Council and was briefly also a Member of the European Parliament (MEP).

== Biography ==
Pafilis was born on 8 November 1954 in the village of Pitsio of Phtiotida. He grew up in a left-wing family and his father was a member of ELAS and participated in the Greek resistance during the Axis occupation of Greece, and in the Civil War as a member of the Democratic Army. About five people of his family were killed in the civil war. When he was 12 he left his village and moved to Athens where he worked in a Construction site. He was a supporter of the Greek Communist Party from his childhood. He is a law graduate from the Aristotle University of Thessaloniki.

== Political career ==
He joined the Communist Youth of Greece during the Greek Dictatorship and witnessed the Polytechnic uprising.

He was elected to the Greek Parliament in June 1989 with Synaspismos for Phthiotida, and re-elected in November 1989 and April 1990. On 16 July 1991, he switched affiliation and joined the Communist Party of Greece (KKE).

He is a member of the Central Committee of KKE since 1991 and General Secretary of EEDYE, the Greek branch of the World Peace Council. Between 2002 and 2004 he was a local councillor of the Athens Prefecture.

He was elected Member of the European Parliament for Greece in 2004 with KKE, and sat with the European United Left–Nordic Green Left. He was re-elected to the European Parliament in July 2009, but resigned on 13 October 2009 after being elected to the Greek Parliament with KKE, and he has since been a member of the Hellenic Parliament.
