= Makrakomi Archaeological Landscapes Project =

Makrakomi (Greece)

The Makrakomi Archaeological Landscapes Project (MALP) was carried out around the village of Makrakomi (Phthiotis) in the Spercheios valley from 2010 to 2015. The aim was exploring the ancient history of the area since the valley was particularly important during the Late Classical and Hellenistic periods as a route connecting the northern and southern parts of Greece.

The project was a collaboration between the Fthiotis and Evritania Ephorate of Antiquities, under the direction of Maria Foteini Papakonstantionou and Swedish archaeologist Anton Bonnier. The archaeological investigations in the western Spercheios Valley (modern municipality of Makrakomi) commenced in 2010. Bonnier directed the work carried out by the Swedish archaeological team and focused on two Hellenistic fortified hill-sites, Profitis Elias and Kastrorachi, as well as their surrounding area. In 2014 a fieldwalking survey was finished. This was aimed at recording surface artefact densities and distribution patterns in association with the fortifications.

Fieldwork also included surveys, geophysical investigations, small scale excavation, and geomorphological studies. An archaeological and architectonic inventory was carried out between 2011 and 2012. Investigations have demonstrated human activity in the valley from the Neolithic until the Late Classical period, when settlements became more long-lived before fading away during the Roman period.

== History of the site ==
The earliest known habitation in the Spercheios valley dates to the Neolithic period (6500–3300/3000 BCE) and human presence is attested throughout the Bronze Age (c. 3000–1070 BCE) with a peak during the Middle (2000–1600 BC) and Late Helladic (1600–1070 BCE) periods. Prehistoric finds are sparse and there is no indication of long-lived settlements before the Late Classical period (400–323 BCE). The Spercheios valley of historical times is mentioned only sporadically in the ancient textual evidence, by Herodotos and Thucydides, leaving archaeological material as the main sources of information. It is however noted that the area was inhabited by three distinct ethnic communities, the Oitaioi, the Malians and the Ainians. The valley and its inhabitants was under Thessaly’s sphere of influence during the late 5th century BCE. Land use and settlements expanded rapidly in the Spercheios valley during the late 4th and early 3rd century. During this time the twin summits of the Profitis Elias hill were fortified with trapezoidal walls and towers. A settlement, from the same period as the fortifications, was laid out just east of the hill in an area known as Asteria. Habitation during the Late Classical and Hellenistic period can be seen with the presence of a dense scatter of pottery. The material found gives the impression of a primarily domestic habitation and included fragments of a Doric column or pilaster and remains of several Olynthian mills as well as various kinds of lamps and two Hellenistic coins.

== See also ==
- Swedish Institute at Athens

== Sources ==
- Papakonstantinou, M.-F., A. Penttinen, G.N. Tsokas, P.I. Tsourlos, A. Stampolidis, I. Fikos, G. Tassis, K. Psarogianni, L. Stavrogiannis, A. Bonnier, M. Nilsson & H. Boman 2013. ‘The Makrakomi Archaeological Landscapes Project (MALP). A preliminary report on investigations carried out in 2010–2012’, OpAthRom 6, 211–260.
- Swedish Institute at Athens - Makrakomi Archaeological Landscapes Project (MALP) (2015): https://www.sia.gr/en/articles.php?tid=6&page=1
- Swedish Institute at Athens - Makrakomi, Phthiotis (2010–2015) (2020): https://www.sia.gr/en/articles.php?tid=340&page=1
