= Oetaea =

Historic region of ancient Thessaly

Oetaea or Oitaia (Ancient Greek: Οἰταία) was a historic region of ancient Thessaly, Greece inhabited by the Oetaeans (Οἰταῖοι). It was the mountainous district around Mount Oeta in the upper valley of the Spercheius, and to the east of Dolopia. The Oetaeans appear to have been the collective name of the various predatory tribes, dwelling upon the northern declivities of Mt Oeta, who are mentioned as plundering both the Malians on the east, and the Dorians on the south. The most important of these tribes were the Aenianes (Αἰνιᾶνες - Aeniānes), called Eniēnes (Ἐνιῆνες) by Homer and Herodotus, an ancient Hellenic Amphictyonic race. They are said to have first occupied the Dotian plain in Pelasgiotis; afterwards to have wandered to the borders of Epirus, and finally to have settled in the upper valley of the Spercheius, where Hypata was their chief town. Besides Hypata, which was the only place of importance in Oetaea, we find mention of Sperchiae and Macra Come by Livy, and of Sosthenis (Σωσθενίς), Homilae (Ὅμιλαι), Cypaera (Κύπαιρα) and Phalachthia (Φαλαχθία) by Ptolemy.

Oetaea formed a political unit in antiquity. It minted silver and bronze coins with the following legends: «ΟΙΤ», «ΟΙΤΑ», «ΟΙΤΑΩΝ», and «ΟΙΤΑΙΩΝ».

== Reference bibliography ==
- DeCourt, Jean-Claude; et al. (2004). "Thessalia and Adjacent Regions". In Hansen, Mogens Herman; Nielsen, Thomas Heine (eds.). An Inventory of Archaic and Classical Poleis. Oxford; New York: Oxford University Press.
