= Cerambus =

Greek mythological figure

In Greek mythology, Cerambus (Ancient Greek: Κέραμβος, Kerambos), a son of Euseiros (himself son of Poseidon) and the nymph Eidothea of Othreis.

== Mythology ==
Cerambus was a survivor of Deucalion's flood by means of wings which he received from the nymphs. These wings had raised him above the water thus escaping death. He dwelt in the land of the Melians on the spurs of Mount Othrys and owned a large herd of cattle.

In another myth, Cerambus was renowned as the greatest singer of his time. He was credited with inventing the shepherd's pipes, as well as with introducing lyre-playing and composing a number of delightful rural songs. This was why the nymphs of Mount Othrys favored him, and even became visible to him as he was playing his lyre. The honors, however, made Cerambus arrogant to the point of insanity: when Pan advised him to drive his cattle down to the plain, due to an extremely severe winter being expected, Cerambus would not listen to him as though smitten by some god.

Moreover, he went so far in his insolence that he told insulting and mindless tales of the nymphs, claiming that they were descended not from Zeus, but from Spercheios and the naiad Deino, and that when Poseidon fell for one of the nymphs, Diopatra, he changed her sisters into poplar trees, but restored their original shape after satisfying his desires. The nymphs were angry and transformed Cerambus into a wood-gnawing beetle Cerambyx (κεράμβυξ). A short while later there came a sudden frost and the streams froze. This was the beginning of the severe winter Pan predicted. The cattle all perished from the cold, as did the trees.

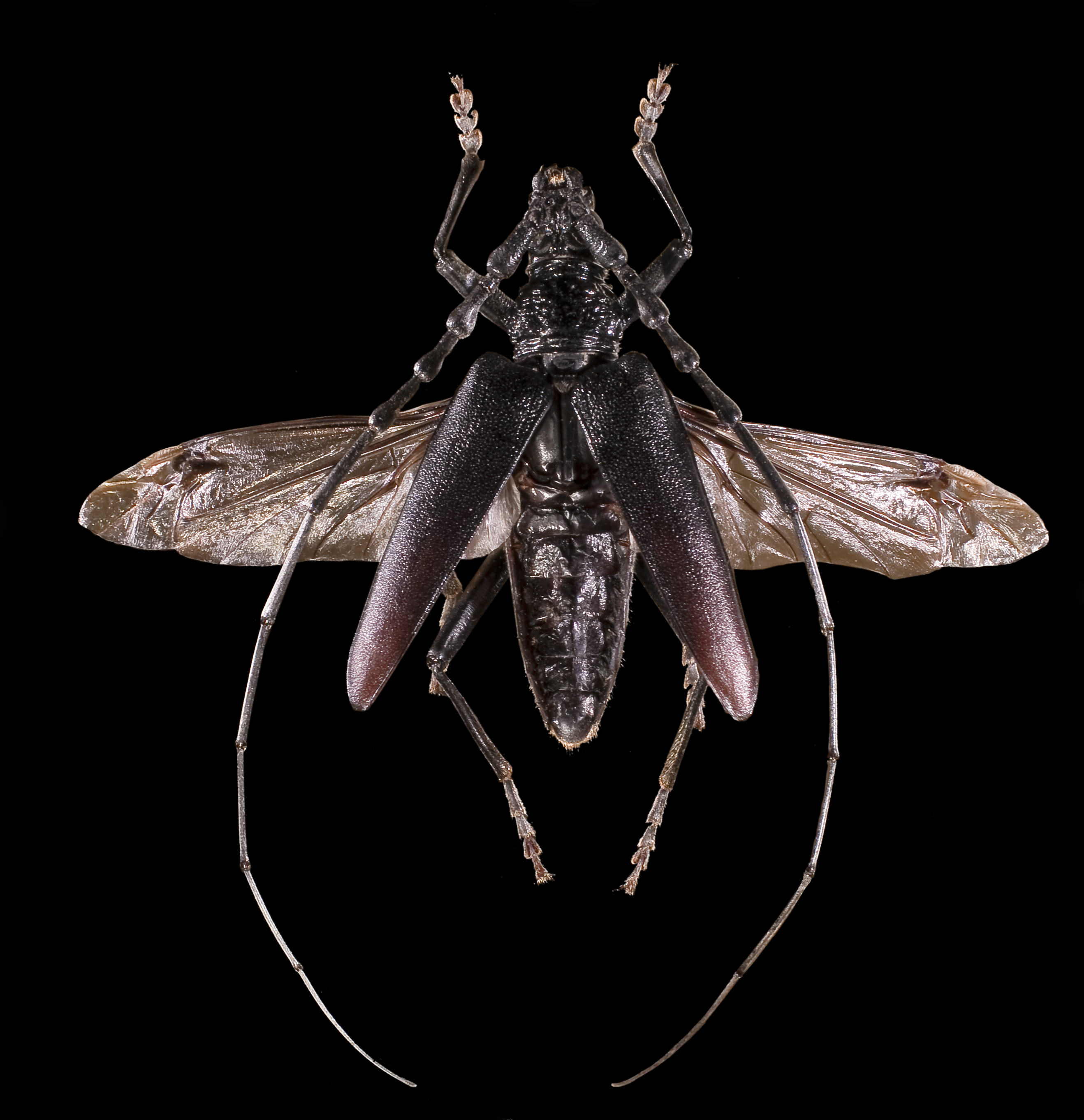
male Cerambyx beetle

"The Cerambyx beetle can be seen on trunks and has hook-teeth, ever moving his jaws together. It is black, long, and has hard wings like a great dung beetle and is called the ox that eats wood. Boys use him as a toy, cutting off his head, to wear as a pendant. The head looks like the horns of a lyre made from a tortoiseshell."

== See also ==
- Myia
- Tithonus
