= Ainis =

Region of ancient Greece

Ainis Αἰνίς
- Region of Ancient Greece
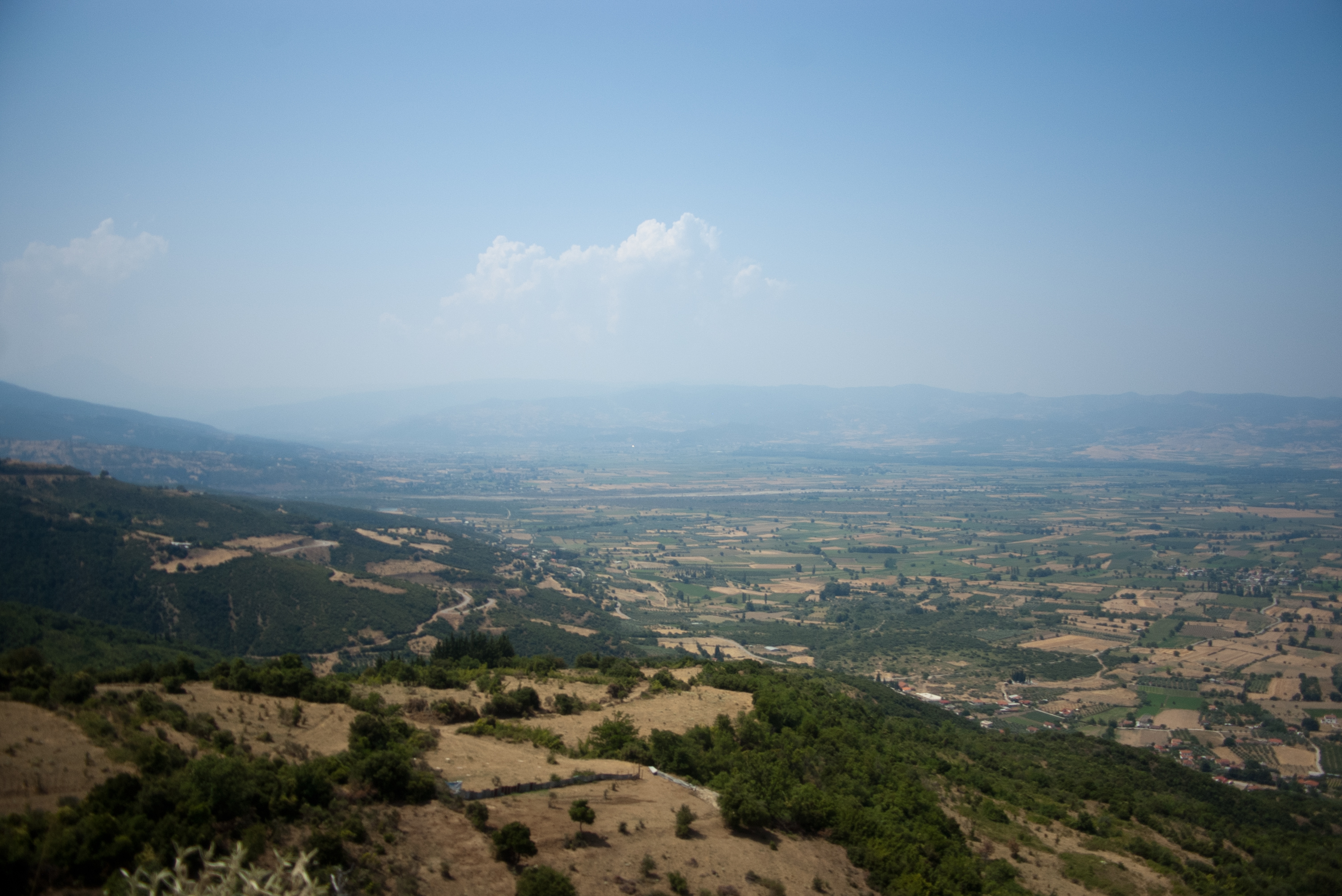
- View of Ainis from Mount Oeta

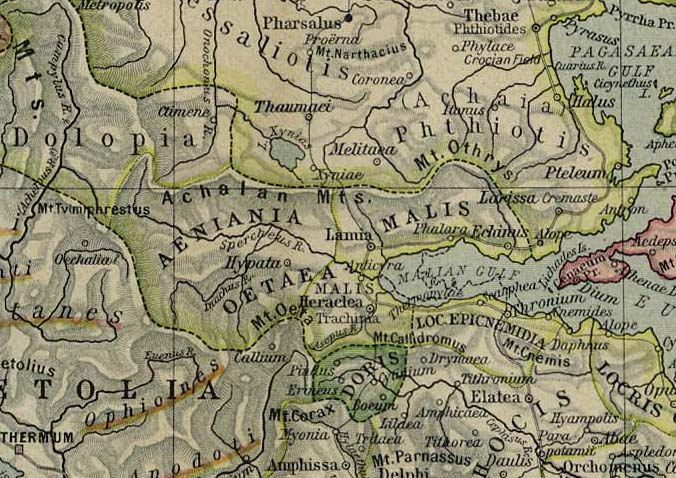
- The valley of Spercheios with Ainis (Aeniania).
- Country: Ancient Greece
- Location: Central Greece
- Major cities: Hypata, Spercheiai?
- Dialects: Doric
- Key periods: Hellenistic

Ainis (Ancient Greek: Αἰνίς, IPA: [ajˈniːs], Modern Greek Αινίδα, IPA: [eˈniða]) or Aeniania (Αἰνιανία), was a region of ancient Greece located near Lamia in modern Central Greece, roughly corresponding to the upper valley of the Spercheios river.

== Name ==
The region takes its name from the tribe of the Ainianians, who dwelt in the area. The name Ainis first occurs in Roman times; the only known earlier name of the region was "land of the Aenianians", Ainianōn khōra (Theopompus).

== Geography ==
Ainis is located in the upper Spercheios valley, bordering with Dolopia in the west, Oitaia in the south, Malis in the east and Achaia Phthiotis in the north. The exact borders with Oitaia and Malis have never been established. The river Spercheios flows through the region on its way down to the Maliac Gulf, and is joined in Ainis by its chief tributary the Inachos. The area is limited to the north by the Othrys mountains, and to the west by a spur of the Pindus mountains, with the peak of Tymphrestus visible from most of the region. To the south lie the peaks of Mount Goulinas and Mount Oiti, separated by the river Inachos.

Most of Ainis consists today of a fertile river plain; whether this was the case during Antiquity does however remain uncertain. As with Greece in general, there is some seismic activity with hot springs close to the village of Platystomo. After the introduction of modern heating, the previously bald foothills of the surrounding mountains are now covered with dense thickets of ivy and prickly pear.

== History ==
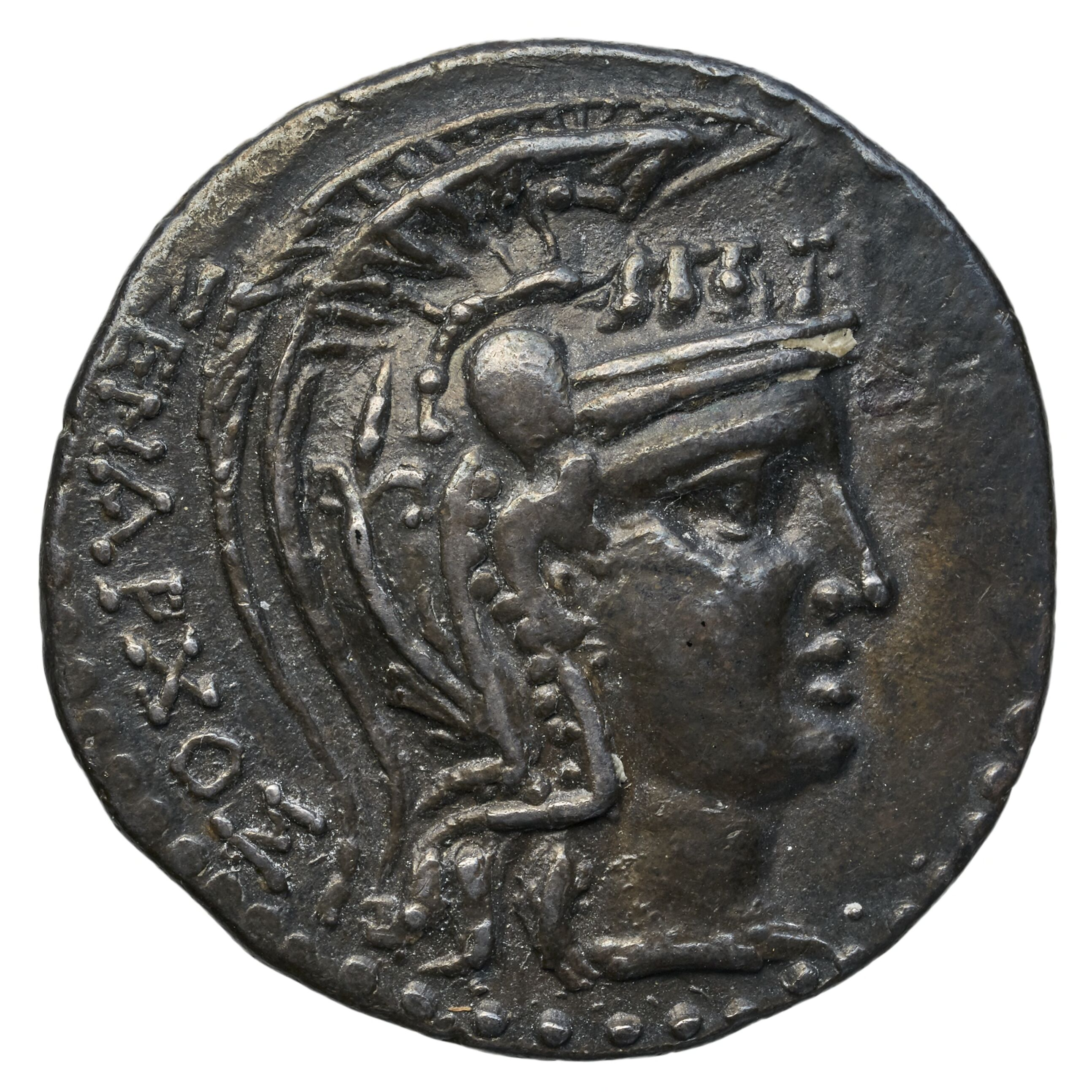
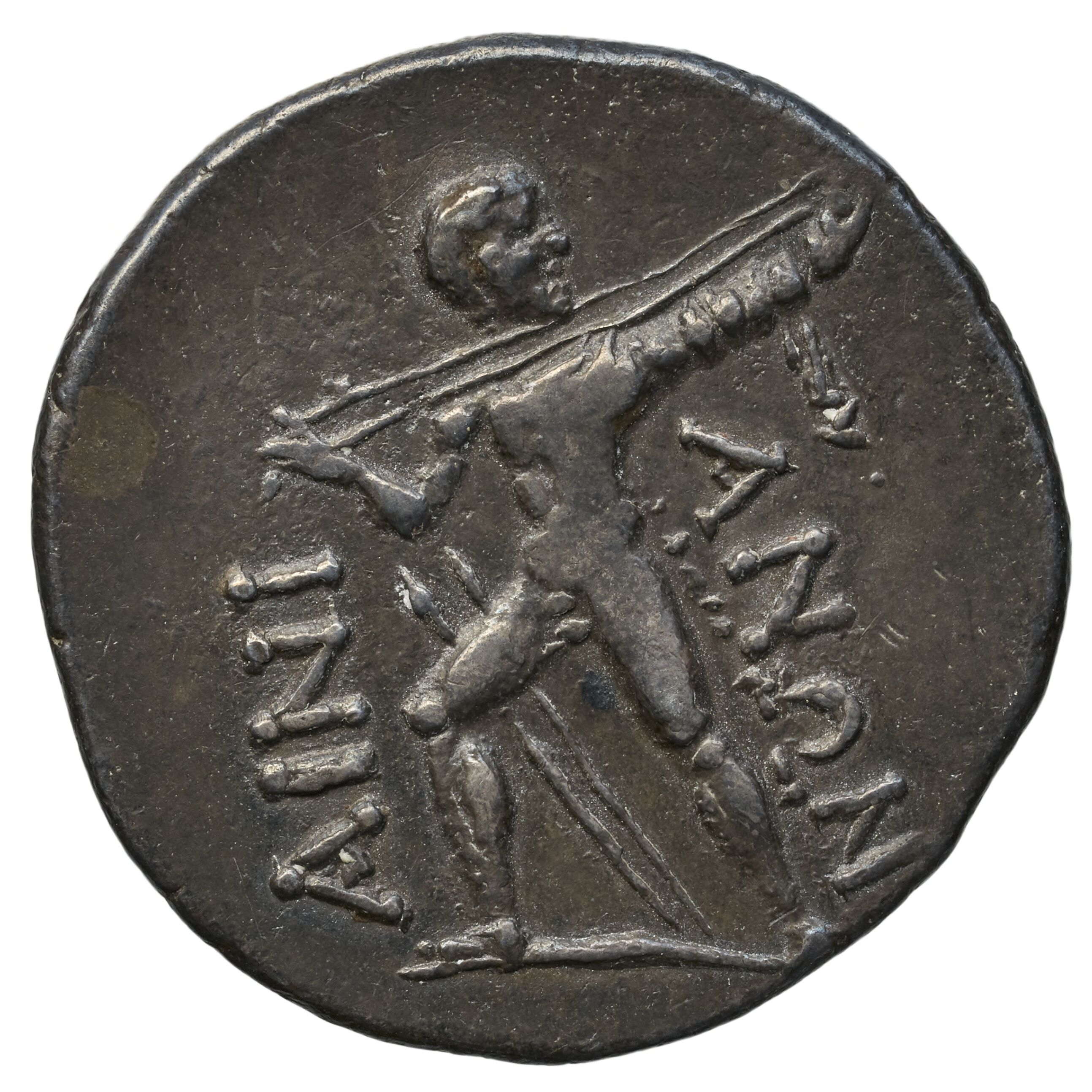
A silver coin inscribed ΑΙΝΙΑΝΩΝ, "of the Ainianes" (Ainianians), on the reverse, with Phemios poised to shoot his sling and two spears propped against his braced right thigh. On the obverse, Athena wears a highly ornamented Attic helmet.

Plutarch writes (Quest. Graec. 12) that the Ainianians were once expelled from Thessaly by the Lapiths to wander the Greek peninsula until they finally settled in the upper Valley of Spercheios. According to Plutarch, when the Ainianians finally settled in what would become Ainis, the land was already occupied by the Inachians and the Achaeans. Phemios, king of the Ainianians, killed Hyparochos. king of the Inachians. with a stone while the latter had his head turned, thus winning the region for his people.

The Ainianians struck coins in Hypata with the head of Athena on the obverse and the legendary king Phemios on the reverse.

== Settlements ==
Very little is known of the settlements in ancient Ainis apart from the city of Hypata. Several poleis (Kapheleis, Korophaioi, Phyrrhagioi and Talana) are mentioned in inscriptions at Delphi, but apart from Hypate, none has yet been convincingly identified. Moreover, other settlements that were not poleis have been identified, including Sosthenis and Spercheiai. A smaller settlement, that of Makra Kome, is also mentioned in a passage by Livy as being ravaged by the Aetolians during the Second Macedonian War. There are, however, several known sites in the area, mostly of the Hellenistic period, some of them of urban character.

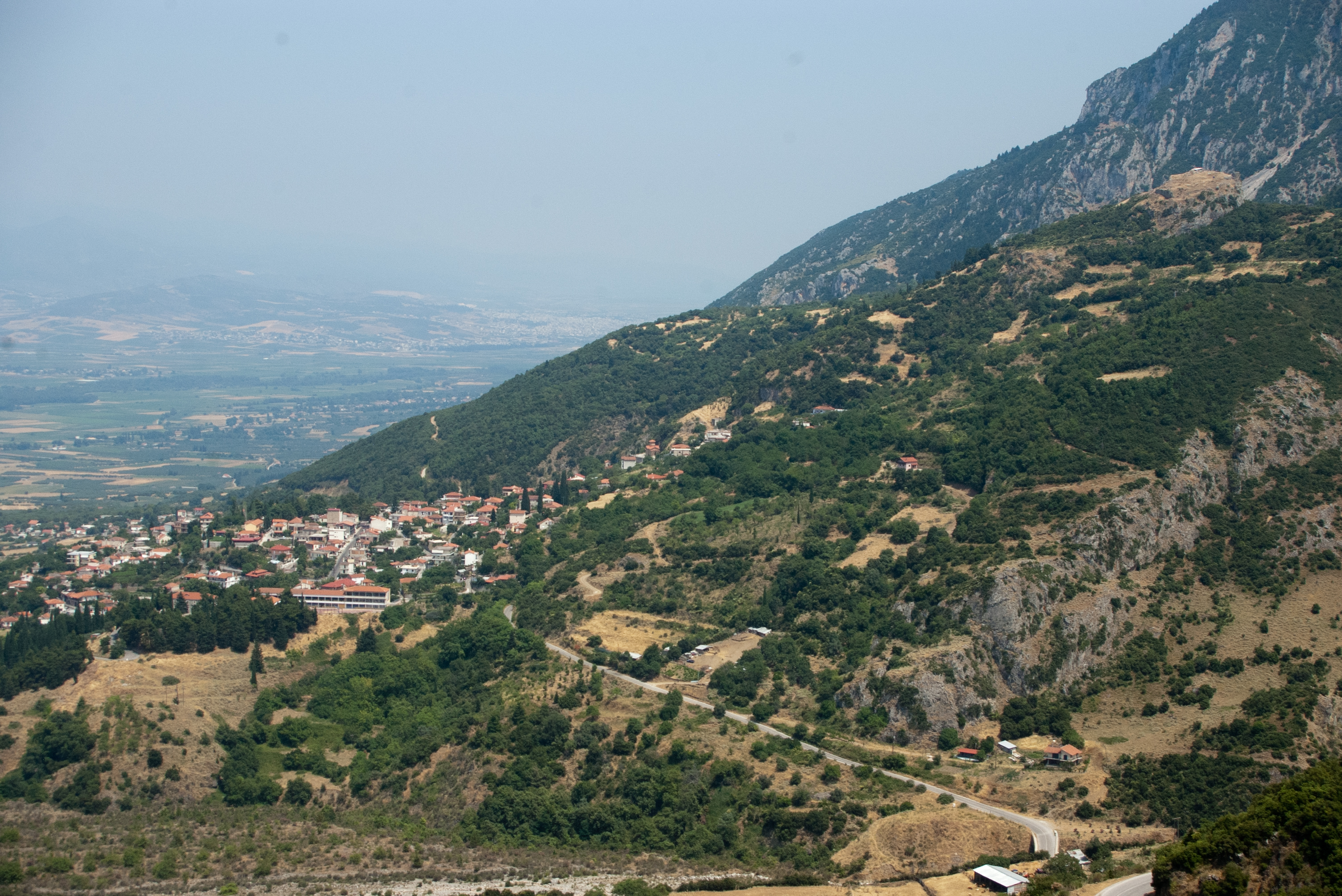
Hypata (Ypati).

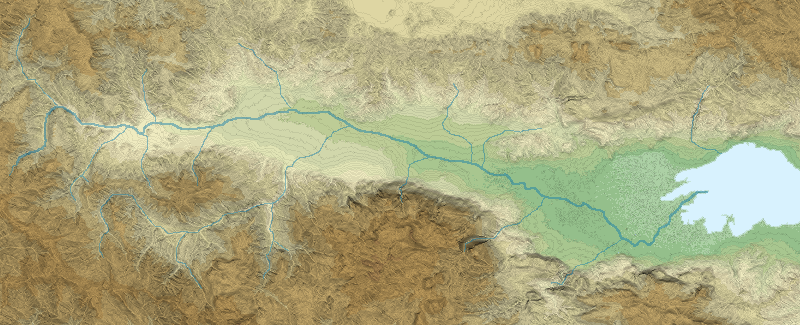
The location of Hypata

=== Hypata ===
The "capital" of Ainis, Hypata (Ὑπάτα), was located at the modern town of Ypati on the northern slope of Mount Oeta; the name is probably derived from a corruption of hypo Oita (ὑπὸ Οἴτα, meaning "near the Mount Oeta"). The ancient city was probably divided in a lower fortified city located approximately at the modern location of the town, and an acropolis which is still visible further up the mountain. Apart from some fortifications and inscriptions, very little of the ancient town is visible today; travelers in the early 20th century noted ancient blocks and slabs built into the modern houses, but most of these were probably destroyed when the German Wehrmacht demolished most of the town during the Second World War. The commanding tower on the acropolis is of a later date, built in the Middle Ages. The political area of Hypata probably extended far north on the river plain, which is also mentioned in several inscriptions. A road over Mount Oeta led southward from Hypata towards Kallion in Aetolia.

Most of Apuleius' The Golden Ass takes place in and about Hypata, which at the time of the novel was a thriving Roman city. After the introduction of Christianity, Hypata became a Metropolitan bishopric in the Roman province of Achaea. In Late Antiquity, Hypata became the refuge of citizens of Patras who fled the Slavic invasion of Greece; as a consequence, the town changed its name to Neopatras ("New Patras"), which it kept until the establishment of the modern Greek state in the 19th century.

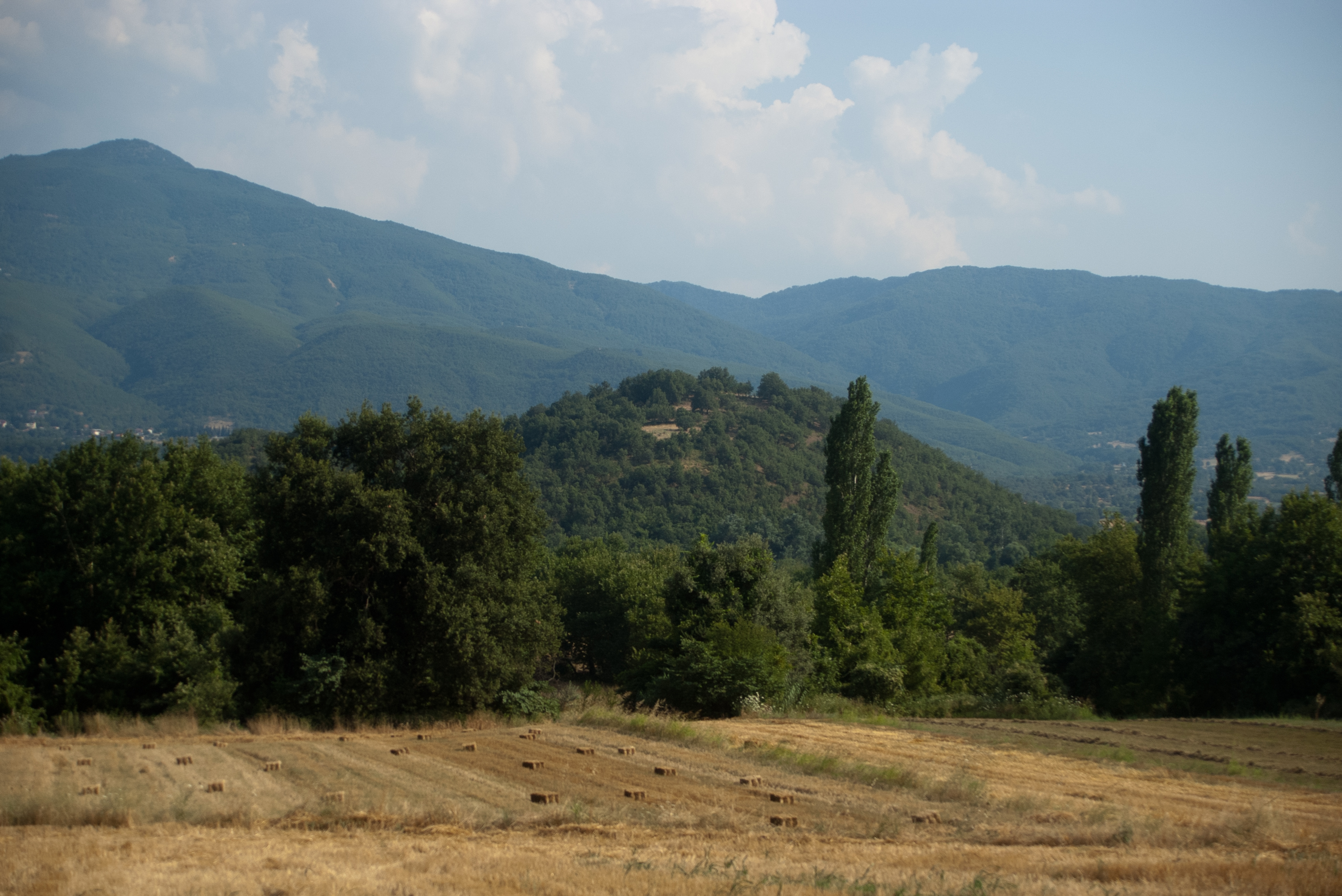
Kastrorakhi seen from Vitoli.

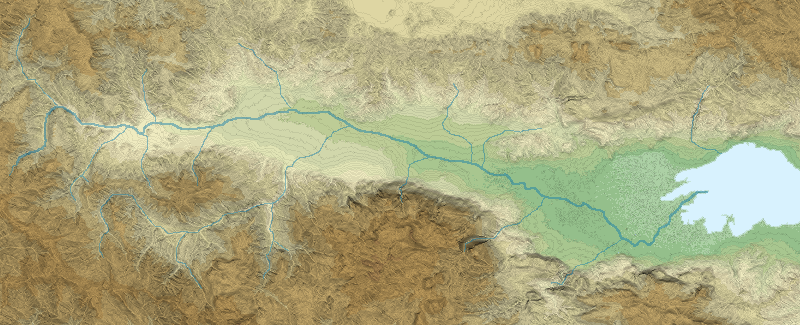
The location of Kastrorakhi.

=== Kastrorachi ===
An elongated hill near the village of Vitoli (Βίτολη) bears the name 'astrorachi (Καστρόραχη, "castle ridge"), and on its top there are remains of a wall with many towers as well as an impressive gate. The wall encompasses the whole hill, which bears the shape of a skewed "T", and is only preserved to a limited degree. No remains of structures other than the circuit wall has been noted. The strategic importance of the fortifications are not to be underestimated since the location dominates the upper plain of the valley as well as the confluence of the Spercheios with its tributary, the Papagourna.

The location is often associated with the ancient polis of Spercheiai, but the identification remains uncertain.

Stählin, visiting the site in the early 1910s, wrote that it is impossible to see whether the site was inhabited in Antiquity due to later agricultural use of the hill. He was only able to find traces of reddish pottery at the location, which he dated to the Hellenistic period. Béquignon, a couple of decades later, reports that the state of the walls were mediocre, probably due to stone robbing.

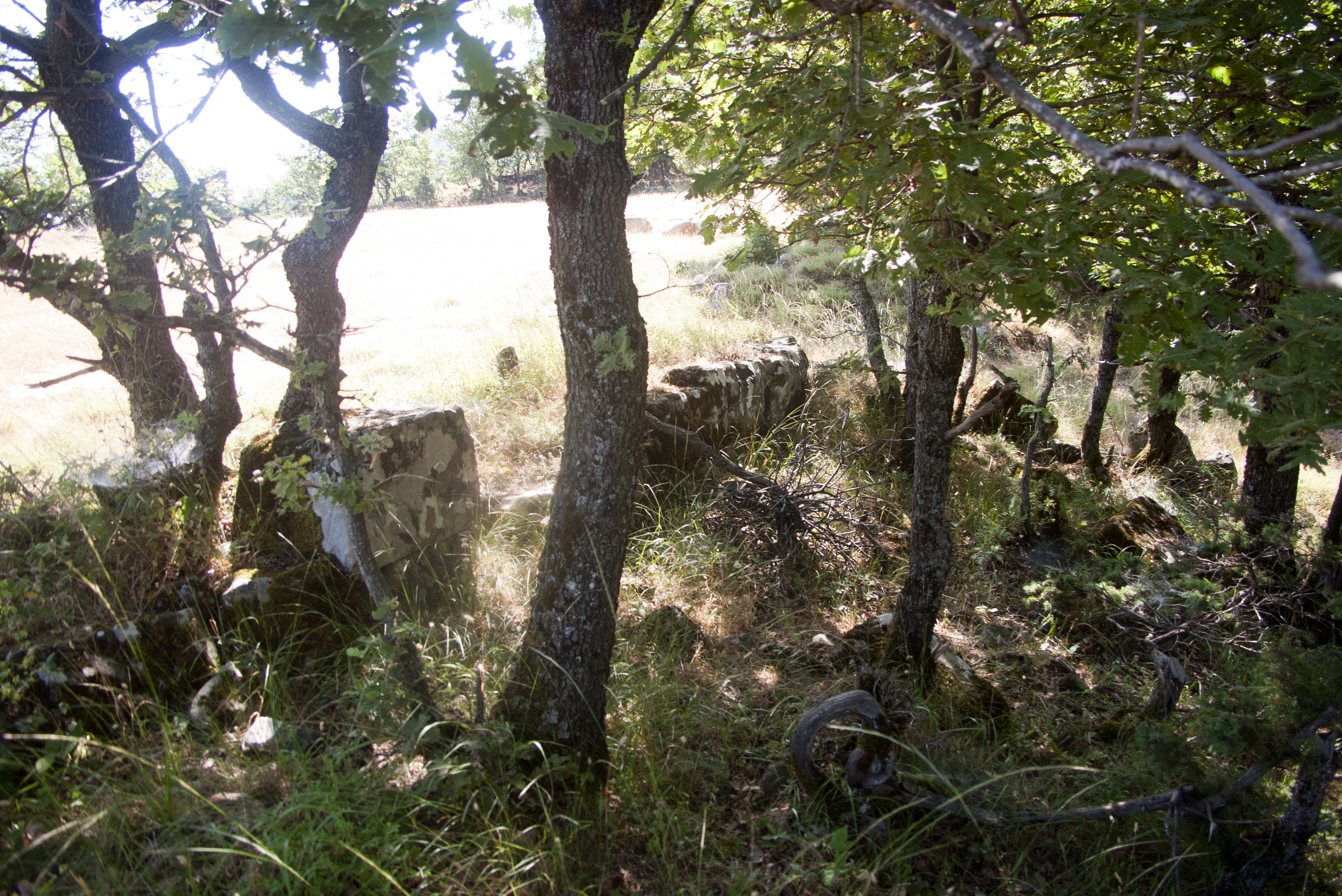
The site at Ano Fteri.

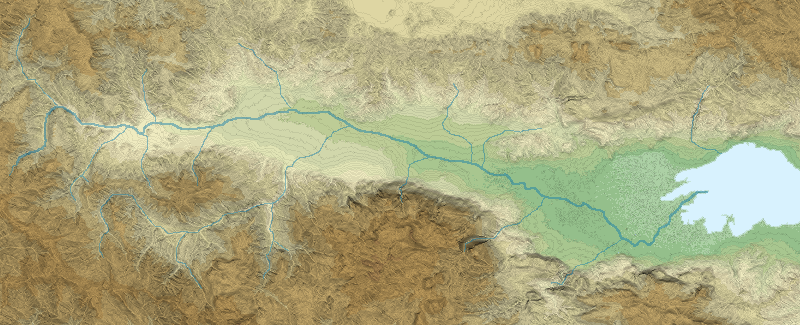
The location of Ano Fteri.

=== Ano Fteri ===
Just south of Kastrorakhi, up the slope from Fteri, is another site of considerable size, known as Ellinika. A circular wall stretches around a plateau between two ravines. The view is quite commanding; all known sites in Ainis are visible from this location, making it a place of strategic importance.

The remains at Ano Fteri, as is also the case of Kastrorakhi, has been linked with the ancient polis of Spercheiai, but this theory has yet to be proven. The body of a female statue in tufa was found here in around 1973, no other finds have been published. Béquignon interpreted the site as a mere observation post and not a position of defense.

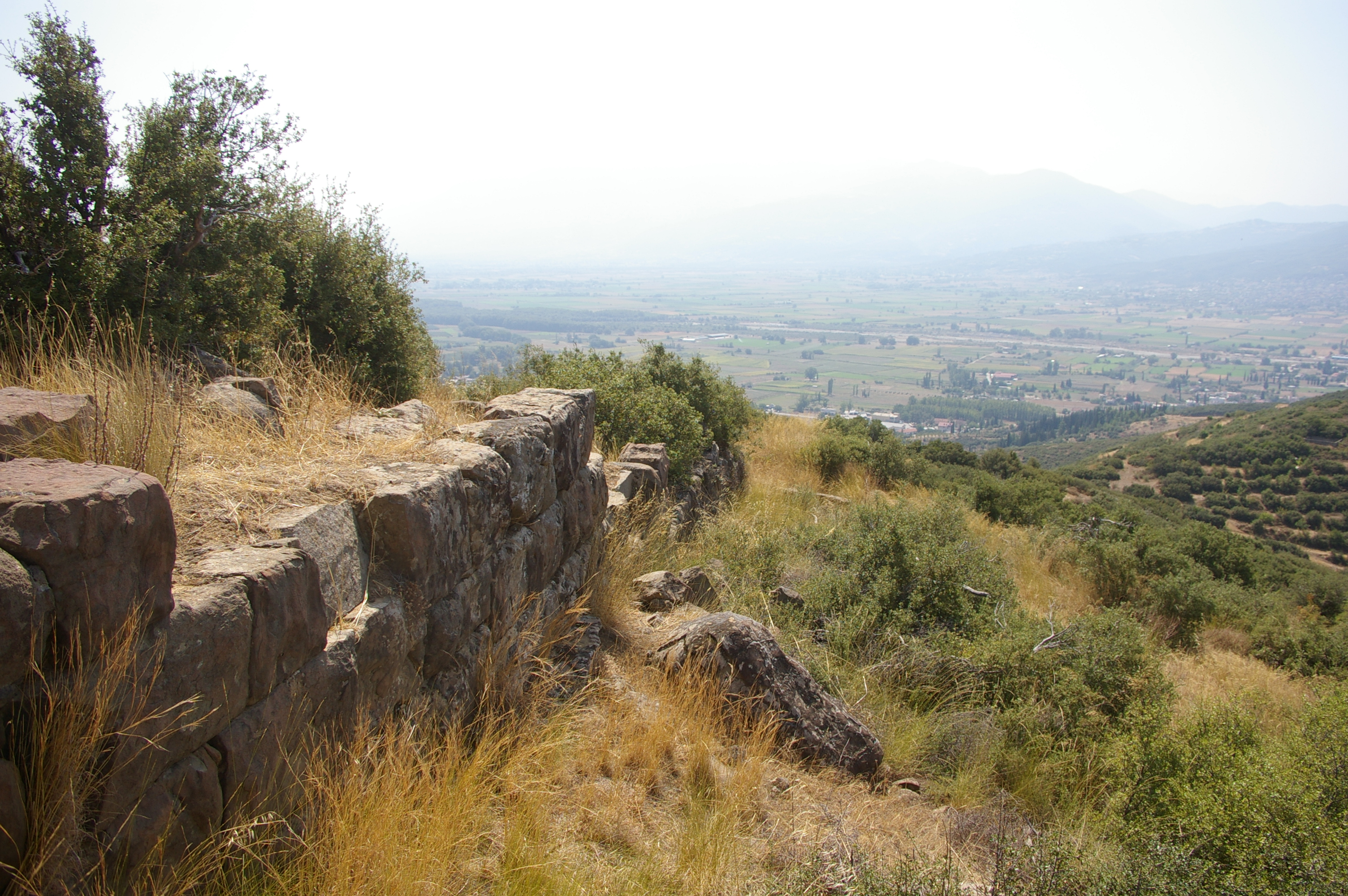
View from Profitis Ilias.

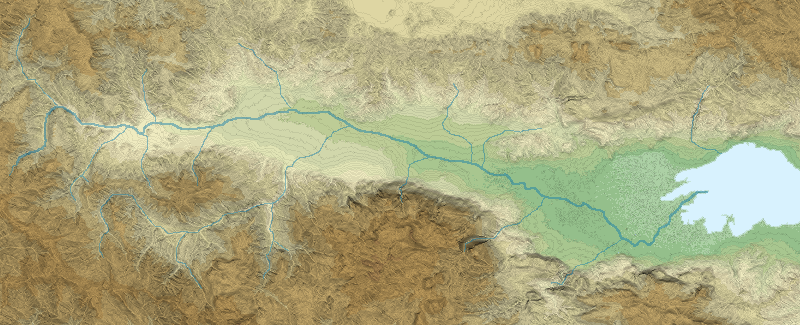
The location of Profitis Ilias.

=== Profitis Ilias ===
Located in the centre of ancient Ainis, the hill of Profitis Ilias (Προφήτης Ηλίας) overlooks most of the lower plains of the Spercheios and guards the pass of Giannitsou, leading north to Thessaly. A circular wall encloses the two peaks of the hill, creating a double acropolis with a shallow saddle in between. Very little is still to be seen at the site; most of the circular wall is lost, the most striking part being located along the southwestern slope with several foundations of towers. Béquignon indicates that there were remains of house foundations on mainly the northern peak at the time of his visit in the 1920s.

In the foothills and at the plain below the hill, Georges Roux in 1954 noted remains of a possible lower city, as well as some epigraphical material in the nearby village of Platystomo. Roux and most other scholars of the early 20th century interpreted the remains at Profitis Ilias as the remains of Makra Kōmē (Μακρὰ Κώμη), briefly mentioned in Livy, and the nearby town of Varybombi has since changed its name to Makrakomi as a result of this.

Stählin, Béquignon and Roux all date the remains at Profitis Ilias to the Hellenistic period (late 4th-early 2nd century B.C.E.), a view supported by finds from excavations conducted by the local ephorate of the Greek Archaeological Service at Lamia in the 1970s. This has been contested by some local authors who claim that the hill is the location of the semi-mythical Phthia, home of Achilles. This is, however, based on philological readings and not supported by any archaeological evidence.

The site at Profitis Ilias is currently the subject of an archaeological survey conducted by the 14th Ephorate at Lamia and the Swedish Institute at Athens.
