= Eidothea (mythology) =

Greek mythological characters

In Greek mythology, Eidothea or Idothea (Ancient Greek: Εἰδοθέα) was the name of the following women:

- Idothea, a daughter of Oceanus and possibly Tethys, thus considered to be one of the Oceanids. Together with her sisters Adrasta and Althaea (Amalthea), she was one of the nurses of young Zeus.
- Eidothea, a sea goddess and daughter of Proteus, the Old Man of the Sea. She told Menelaus how to hold her father so that he could not escape. Eidothea was simply called Eido who changed her name into Theonoe. Another of her name was Eurynome.
- Eidothea, a nymph of Othreis, mother of Cerambus by Eusiros (son of Poseidon). Cerambus who was metamorphosed by the nymphs into a gnawing beetle because of his insolence. In some myths, her son was borne up into the air on wings by the nymphs escaping the flood of Deucalion.
- Eidothea or Eidothee, a Carian woman, daughter of King Eurytus and possible spouse of Miletus who bore him Byblis and Caunus.
- Eidothea, second wife of Phineus, king of Thrace. She was the sister of Cadmus and thus, maybe the daughter of Agenor, king of Tyre. Eidothea put out the eyes of her stepsons (Gerymbas and Aspondus) with the sharp shuttle in her blood-stained hands and also caused to imprisoned them.
