= Lou Pappan =

American restaurateur (1930–2023)

Lou Pappan

Elias Demetrios Papanikolaou (May 30, 1930 – April 11, 2023), more commonly known as Lou Pappan, was a Greek personality and western Pennsylvania-based restaurant owner who owned the restaurant chain, Pappan's Family Restaurants. He has been described as a Beaver County icon.

== Biography ==
=== Early life ===
Pappan was born in Makrakomi, Phthiotis, Greece in 1930. His father owned a restaurant in Makrakomi, where he and his family worked and learned to cook. His village was affected by World War II combat and he often relied on air-lifted food from American aircraft. He immigrated to Beaver Falls, Pennsylvania, on June 7, 1951 and did not know English. He worked at his uncle's neighborhood bar and later joined the U.S. Army where he served in the 101st Airborne Division during the Korean War. He changed his surname to Pappan due to pronunciation issues, with an Army sergeant calling him, "The Alphabet".

=== Career ===
Pappan got married in 1960 and bought his first restaurant in 1961, which had been a failed candy store called "The Sweet Shop". Pappan claimed to have kept the name because he spent all his money to the point where he couldn't afford a new sign. In 1964, he opened the first Pappan's Family Restaurant location. The restaurant became known for its fried chicken radio and television commercials which featured Pappan saying his famous phrases, "Chicken, Chicken, Chicken!" and "you gonna like it". Pappan had over 30 Pappan Family Restaurant locations at his peak and Pappan also owned franchises to 20 Roy Rogers restaurants. Pappan often gave children at restaurants silver dollars, handing out over $22,000 worth of silver dollars to patrons in 1989. Pappan also held an annual picnic at Bradys Run Park for senior citizens to eat for free.

By the mid-1990's, Pappan had begun to exit the restaurant business, going into in commercial and residential real estate with his children, forming a company called Fourway Properties.

Pappan's Family Restaurants filed for bankruptcy in 2007. Pappan retired in the 2010s and died on April 11, 2023, at the age of 92.
