= Talana (disambiguation) =

Talana is a commune in Sardinia, Italy.

Talana may also refer to:

- Talana, KwaZulu-Natal, a village in South Africa
- Talana (Ainis), a city-state in Ainis in ancient Thessaly
- Talana (house), in Melbourne, Victoria, Australia
