= Latyia =

Latyia (Ancient Greek: Λάτυια) was a town in Ainis in ancient Thessaly. It is known from epigraphic evidence.

It is unlocated.
