= Palaiokerasia =

Palaiokerasia Παλαιοκερασιά
- Community
- Location within Greece
- Coordinates: 38°55′44″N 22°43′54″E
- Country: Greece
- Administrative region: Central Greece
- Regional unit: Phthiotis
- Municipality: Stylida
- Municipal unit: Echinaioi

Population (2021)
  - Community: 233
- Time zone: UTC+2 (EET)
  - Summer (DST): UTC+3 (EEST)

Palaiokerasia (Greek: Παλαιοκερασιά) is a Greek village on Mount Othrys, in the Echinaioi municipal unit of the Stylida municipality, Phthiotis, with vast olive groves. Population 233 (2021).
