= Oeniadae (Thessaly) =

Village of ancient Thessaly

Oeniadae or Oiniadai (Ancient Greek: Οἰνιάδαι) was a village of ancient Thessaly in the district of Oetaea.

Its site is unlocated.
