= Lamia Municipal Stadium =

Football stadium in Lamia, Greece

- Athanasios Diakos
- Interactive map of Lamia Municipal Stadium
- Full name: Lamia Municipal Stadium
- Location: Lamia, Greece
- Coordinates: 38°54′36″N 22°25′52″E
- Owner: Municipality of Lamia
- Operator: PAS Lamia 1964
- Capacity: 5,500 (4,987 seated)
- Surface: Grass
- Public transit: Lamia railway station

Construction
- Built: 1952

Tenant
- PAS Lamia 1964

Lamia Municipal Stadium is a football stadium in the Greek city of Lamia which hosts the home matches of Super League Greece 2 side PAS Lamia 1964. It holds approximately 5,500 seats.

== History ==
It was built in 1952 and belongs to the Municipality of Lamia. The stadium is located in the northern part of Lamia, next to the local Town Hall and is part of Lamia Municipal Sports Center (DAK of Lamia).

Its capacity is 5,500 seats, making it the twelfth largest stadium in the Football League for the 2014–15 season. The stadium was rebuilt in 2004 and 2008, and blue plastic seats were added to all the stands.

The record of attendance at the Lamia Municipal Stadium took place on March 31, 1968, in a match between Lamia and Trikala, with 11,502 fans staying at the stadium stage.

In the summer of 2017 the stadium was renovated to license PAS Lamia 1964 in the Super League. So, five new headlamps were added for better illumination of the pitch and also new seats. In addition, the main stadium of the stadium was built, the changing rooms, benches and much more were renovated.

In September 2020 the Municipal of Lamia changed the name of the stadium to Athanasios Diakos, who was a Greek military commander during the Greek War of Independence, considered a venerable national hero in Greece.
