= MALP =

MALP may refer to:

- Makrakomi Archaeological Landscapes Project, around the village of Makrakomi in Greece 2010–2015
- Miniature Air Launched Payload (MALP), a miniature UAV
- Mexican American Library Program (MALP), at the Benson Latin American Collection, University of Texas
