= Euseirus =

In Greek mythology, Euseirus or Eusiros was the son of Poseidon and father of Cerambus by the nymph Eidothea of Mt. Othrys. His son was changed into a gnawing beetle by the nymphs because of his arrogance. In some myths, Cerambus was borne up into the air on wings by the nymphs escaping the flood of Deucalion.

== See also ==
- Metamorphoses in Greek mythology
- List of figures in Greek mythology
