= Kapheleis =

City-state in Ainis in ancient Thessaly

Kapheleis (Ancient Greek: Καφελείς) was a polis (city-state) in Ainis in ancient Thessaly.

It is unlocated.
