= Homilae =

Town in Oetaea in ancient Thessaly

Coordinates: 38°45′54″N 22°24′14″E

Homilae or Homilai (Ancient Greek: Ὅμιλαι) was a town in Oetaea in ancient Thessaly. The town's name appears in an epigraph dated to 206/5 BCE as providing a hieromnemone to the Amphictyonic League on behalf of the Aetolians.

Its site is at the modern site of Kouvelo Kastro/Kastro Orias.
