= Phalachthia =

Town of Oetaea in ancient Thessaly

Phalachthia (Ancient Greek: Φαλαχθία), also Phalachthia in Phthiotis (Φαλαχθία Φθιώτιδος), was a town of Oetaea in ancient Thessaly.

Its location is unknown.
