= Giannitsou =

Giannitsou Γιαννιτσού
- Community
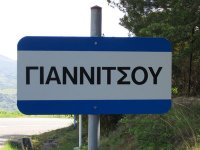

- Location within Greece
- Coordinates: 38°59′42″N 22°06′41″E
- Country: Greece
- Administrative region: Central Greece
- Regional unit: Phthiotis
- Municipality: Makrakomi
- Municipal unit: Makrakomi

Population (2021)
  - Community: 413
- Time zone: UTC+2 (EET)
  - Summer (DST): UTC+3 (EEST)

Giannitsou (Greek: Γιαννιτσού) is a semi-mountainous village, altitude of ~300m above the sea level, in western Phthiotis/Central Greece, with about 400 inhabitants. It is located north of Makrakomi and 36 km northwest of Lamia. After the recent reorganization of administrative divisions (Kallikratis Plan) it is part of the municipality of Makrakomi. In walking distance from the village there is a pre-Ottoman-era settlement which is yet unexplored, called Lavanitsa.

The local economy is based on agriculture, i.e. olives, wheat, grapes, wine, and livestock. Lately, after the renovation of Platystomo hot-springs, which are only 4 km away, the area got a touristic perspective.

Although the village is not fully developed, the central square is framed by two traditional cafes and a grocery shop. In addition, in the village an active cultural institution is based which organises several happenings around the year.
