= Tymfristos =

Mountain in Greece

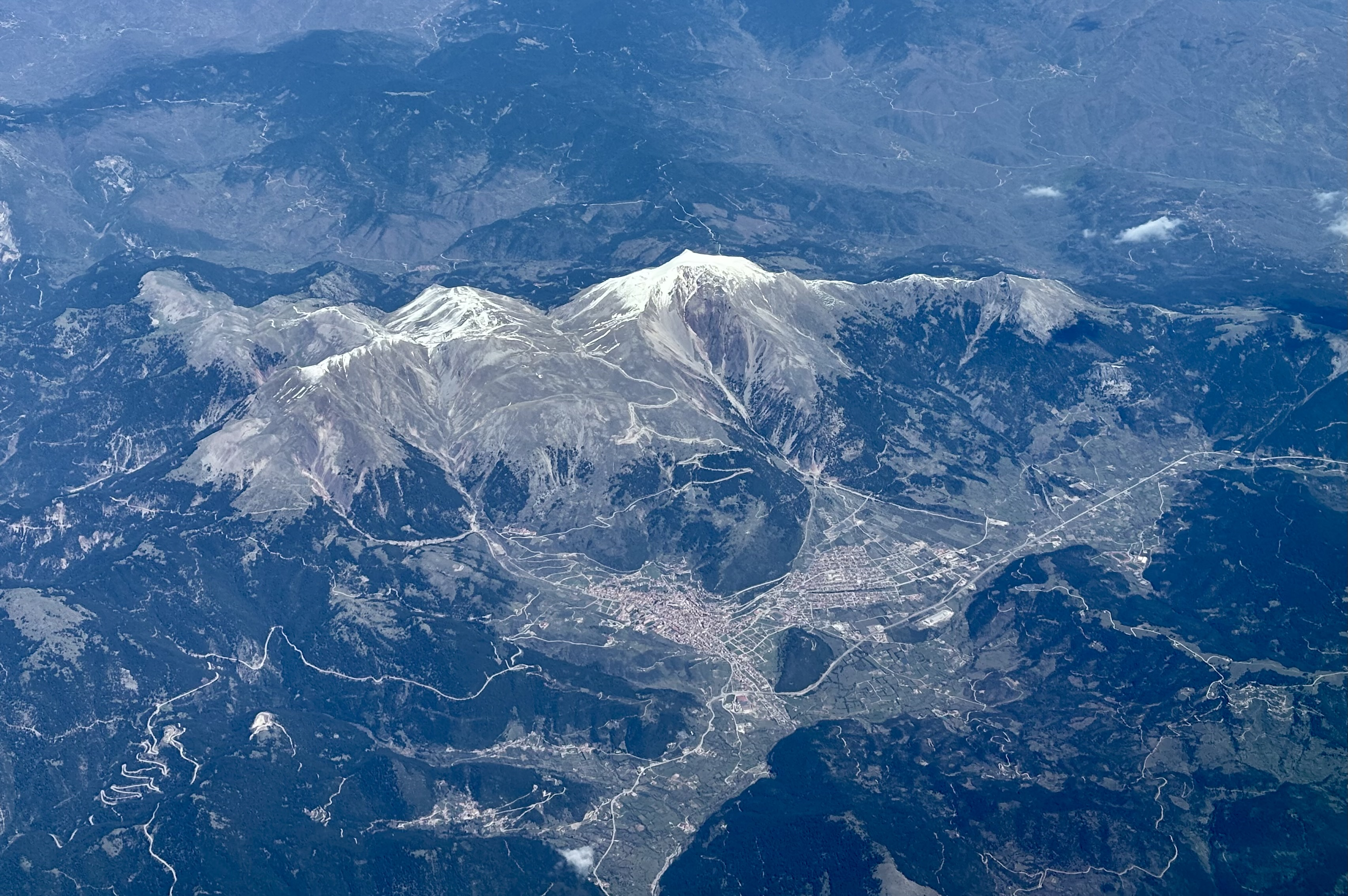
- Aerial view of Tymfristos

Highest point
- Elevation: 2,315 m (7,595 ft)
- Prominence: 1,114 m (3,655 ft)
- Coordinates: 38°56′42″N 21°49′26″E

Geography
- Location within Greece
- Location: eastern Evrytania and western Phthiotis, Greece

Tymfristos (Greek: Τυμφρηστός [timfriˈstos]) is a mountain in the eastern part of Evrytania and the western part of Phthiotis, Greece. The mountain is a part of the Pindus mountain range. The elevation of its highest peak, Velouchi (Greek: Βελούχι), is 2,315 m. The nearest mountains are Kaliakouda and Panaitoliko to the south, Vardousia to the southeast and the Agrafa mountains to the north. It is drained by the river Spercheios to the east and by tributaries of the Acheloos (including Megdovas) to the west. The name Velouchi comes from Velos which means arrow, as Aetolian archers were known for harassing invading pre-Christian Celts and Persians with their famous archery. See The Greek and Macedonian Art of War, by F.E. Adcock, 1962.

Forests dominate the lower areas of the mountain, and the higher elevations are covered with grasslands. The nearest town is Karpenisi, to the southwest. Other villages are Tymfristos and Agios Georgios Tymfristou to the east. The Greek National Road 38 (Agrinio - Karpenisi - Lamia) passes south of the mountain.

== See also ==
- List of mountains in Greece
