= Lamia railway station =

Railway station in Leianokladi, Greece

Λαμία Lamia
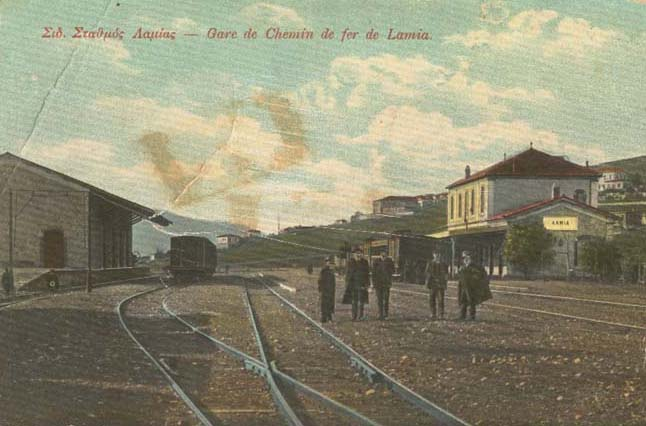
- Lamia railway station, on the right the passenger termernal and on the left the commercial station, on a postcard from the early 20th century.

General information
- Location: Konstantinoupoleos; 351 00 Lamia; Greece
- Coordinates: 38°53′46″N 22°26′05″E
- Owner: GAIAOSE
- Line: Leianokladi–Stylida railway
- Platforms: 2 (1 in use)
- Tracks: 5 (3 siding)
- Train operators: Hellenic Train

Construction
- Structure type: at-grade
- Platform levels: 1
- Parking: Yes
- Cycle facilities: No

Other information
- Status: Staffed
- Website: http://www.ose.gr/en/

History
- Opened: 1905
- Closed: 1970 (seasonal)
- Rebuilt: 1991 (Normal services)
- Electrified: No

Services
Preceding station	Hellenic Train	Following station
Pagrati towards Leianokladi	G2 Leianokladi-Stylida	Roditsa towards Stylida
Location

Stylida railway station (Greek: Σιδηροδρομικός Σταθμός Λαμίας, romanized: Sidirodromikós stathmós Lamia) is a railway station in Lamia, Phthiotis, Greece. The station opened 1905, along with the rest of the line. It is served by Regional services to Leianokladi and Stylida.

== History ==
The station opened 1905, along with the rest of the line. In 1920 the line became part of the Hellenic State Railways. In 1971, the Hellenic State Railways was reorganised into the OSE taking over responsibilities for most for Greece's rail infrastructure. However, by 1970 the regular passenger itineraries from Piraeus and Athens to Lamia and Stylida were suspended, and only the periodic summer excursion itineraries for the transport of bathers to the beach of Agia Marina and the commercial itineraries remained. In 1991, the line Athens Leianokladi-Lamia-Stylida is reopened with passenger trains and freight services.

In December 2009, the following list of passenger cities was recorded on tickets from the metropolitan (to Fthiotida) Lamia railway station: Athens, Thessaloniki, Larissa, Katerini, Livadeia, Platy, Tithorea, Oinoi, Agios Stefanos, Thebes, Volos, Palaiofarsalos, Aeginio, Amphikleia, Bralos, Domokos, Thaumakos, Leptokarya and Kalambaka.

In 2011 the passenger operation of the line is transformed into a suburban line with 12 pairs of routes, 7 between Leianokladi-Lamia-Stylida and the remaining 5 between Leianokladi-Lamia. This connecting bus connected the OSE agency in Lamia with the Leianokladi station. In 2017 OSE's passenger transport sector was privatised as TrainOSE, currently a wholly owned subsidiary of Ferrovie dello Stato Italiane infrastructure, including stations, remained under the control of OSE. On 16 March 2020, in the midst of the 2020 coronavirus pandemic, it was decided to suspend services (trains and bus lines) temporarily. On 1 July 2020, the railway line reopened with the measures envisaged for the coronavirus. In July 2022, the station began being served by Hellenic Train, the rebranded TranOSE

In August 2025, the Greek Ministry of Infrastructure and Transport confirmed the creation of a new body, Greek Railways (Greek: Σιδηρόδρομοι Ελλάδος, romanized: Ellinikí Sidiródromi Monoprósopi) to assume responsibility for rail infrastructure, planning, modernisation projects, and rolling stock across Greece. Previously, these functions were divided among several state-owned entities: OSE, which managed infrastructure; ERGOSÉ, responsible for modernisation projects; and GAIAOSÉ, which owned stations, buildings, and rolling stock. OSE had overseen both infrastructure and operations until its vertical separation in 2005. Rail safety has been identified as a key priority. The merger follows the July approval of a Parliamentary Bill to restructure the national railway system, a direct response to the Tempi accident of February 2023, in which 43 people died after a head-on collision.

== Facilities ==
The station has waiting rooms and staffed booking office within the original brick-built station building. The station has a buffet. Basic shelters are located on Platform 2, and digital display screens on both platforms. There is a taxi rank in the forecourt, with a postbox at the front entrance. However, there is no onsite parking at the station, with only parking within walking distance of the station.

== Services ==
It is served by Regional services to Leianokladi and Stylida. The station sees around 12 trains per day.

== Station layout ==
Ground level	Customer service	Exit/Tickets
Level; Ε1	Side platform, doors will open on the right
Level; Ε1	Platform 1	towards Leianokladi (Pagrati) ←
Level; Ε1	Platform 2	towards Stylida (Roditsa) →
Level; Ε1	Side platform, doors will open on the right/left

== See also ==
- Railway stations in Greece
- Hellenic Railways Organization
- Hellenic Train
