= Macra Come =

Coordinates: 38°57′29″N 22°06′47″E

Macra Come or Makra Kome (Ancient Greek: Μακρά κώμη) was a fortress mentioned by Livy along with Sperchiae in Ainis, in ancient Thessaly. It may have been a town of the Aenianes.

Its site is at a place called Varybopi in modern-day Makrakomi.
