= Korophaioi =

City state situated in ancient Thessaly

Korophaioi (Ancient Greek: Κοροφαῖοι) was a polis (city-state) in Ainis in ancient Thessaly.

It is unlocated.
