= Phyrrhagioi =

Phyrrhagioi (Ancient Greek: Φυρράγιοι) was a polis (city-state) in Ainis in ancient Thessaly.

It is unlocated.
