= Talana (Ainis) =

Talana (Ancient Greek: Ταλάνα) was a polis (city-state) in Ainis in ancient Thessaly.

It is unlocated.
