= Spercheiada =

Spercheiada Σπερχειάδα
- Municipal unit
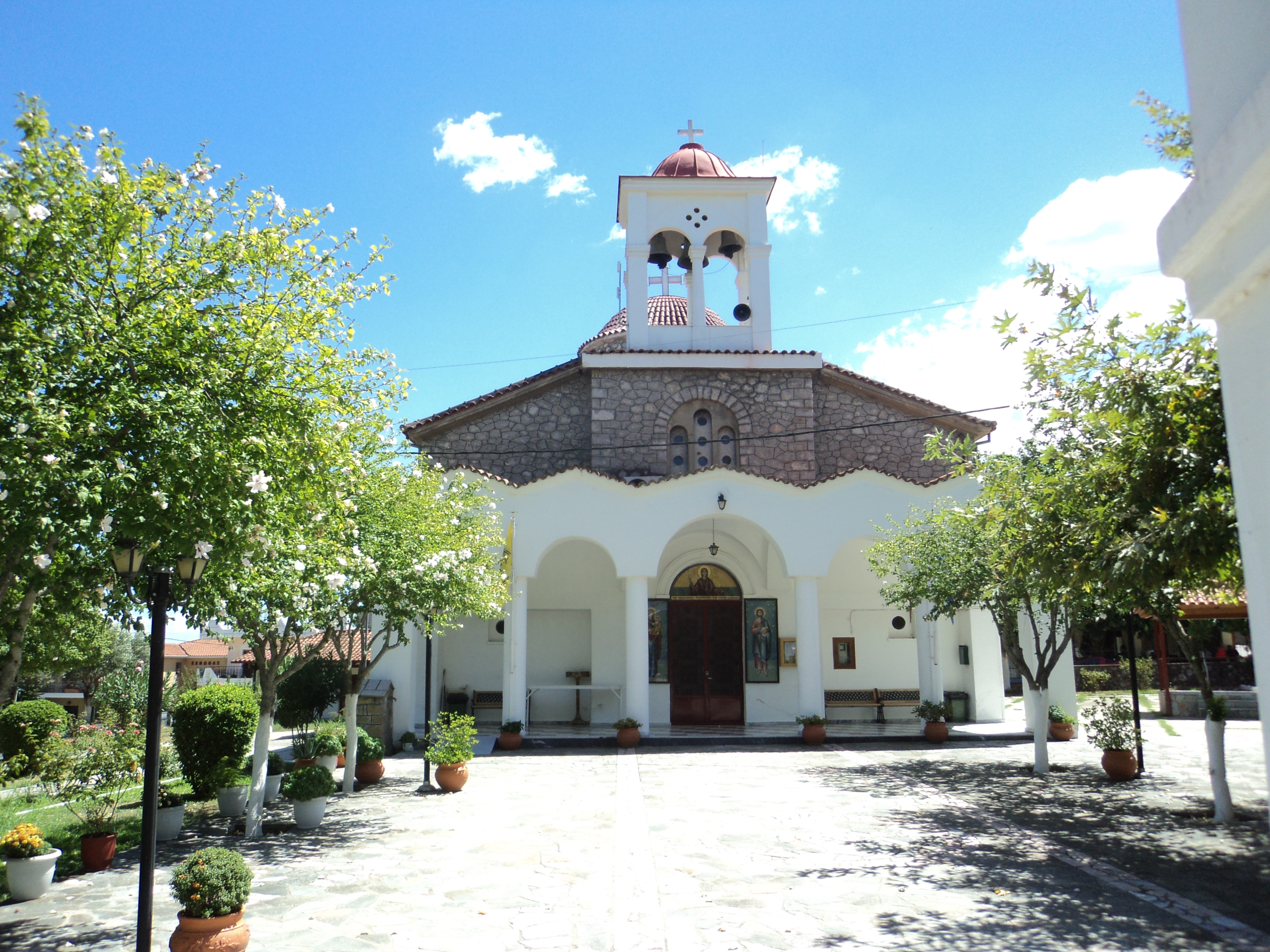

- Location within the regional unit

- Location within Greece
- Coordinates: 38°55′N 22°8′E
- Country: Greece
- Administrative region: Central Greece
- Regional unit: Phthiotis
- Municipality: Makrakomi

Area
  - Municipal unit: 379.5 km^{2} (146.5 sq mi)

Population (2021)
  - Municipal unit: 6,530
  - Municipal unit density: 17.2/km^{2} (44.6/sq mi)
  - Community: 2,470
- Time zone: UTC+2 (EET)
  - Summer (DST): UTC+3 (EEST)
- Postal code: 350 03
- Area code: 22360

Spercheiada (Greek: Σπερχειάδα) is a town and a former municipality in the western part of Phthiotis, Greece. Since the 2011 local government reform it is part of the municipality Makrakomi, of which it is the seat and a municipal unit. The municipal unit has an area of 379.521 km^{2}. The population of Spercheiada municipal unit was 6,530, with 2,470 of them in the town of Spercheiada (2021 census).

== Subdivisions ==
The municipal unit Spercheiada is subdivided into the following communities:

- Agios Sostis
- Anatoli
- Argyria
- Gardiki
- Kallithea
- Kampia
- Kanalia
- Kloni
- Kolokythia
- Kyriakochori
- Lefkada
- Marmara
- Mesopotamia
- Nikolitsi
- Palaiovracha
- Palaiochori
- Perivoli
- Pitsi
- Platanos
- Pougkakia
- Spercheiada
- Fteri

== Notable people ==
- Elpida (1950-), singer
