= Deino (mythology) =

Figures in Greek mythology with the name Deino

In Greek mythology, Dino or Deino (Ancient Greek: Δεινώ means "dread" or "eddy, whirlpool") may refer to the following divinities:

- Deino, also called Persis, one of the Graea who were daughters of the sea-deities Phorcys and Ceto. Her sisters were called Enyo and Pemphredo. They were old women from birth and had one eye and one tooth, and these they passed to each other in turn.
- Deino, a Malian naiad nymph who consorted with the river god Sperchius and gave birth to the Spercheides including Diopatra who was loved by Poseidon.
