= Leianokladi–Stylida railway =

Railway line in Greece

Overview
- Status: Operational
- Owner: Hellenic Railways Organisation
- Locale: Greece Central Greece,
- Termini: Leianokladi 38.8906°N 22.3729°E; Stylida 38.9134546°N 22.6134648°E
- Stations: 10

Service
- Type: Regional railway
- Operator: Hellenic Train

History
- Opened: 1904

Technical
- Line length: 22.7 km (14.1 mi)
- Track length: 1,453 mm (Standard-gauge)
- Number of tracks: Single track
- Track gauge: 1,435 mm (4 ft 8 1/2 in) standard gauge
- Operating speed: 80 km/h (50 mph) (average)

The Leianokladi to Stylida railway or Proastiakos Lamia (Lamia Suburban Railway) is an unelectrificated standard gauge single-track railway regional railway line that connects Leianokladi in Central Greece, with Lamia and Stylida. The route is covered in 33 minutes.

== History ==
The line opened 1905. In 1920 the line became part of the Hellenic State Railways. In 1971, the Hellenic State Railways was reorganised into the OSE taking over responsibilities for most for Greece's rail infrastructure. However, by 1970 the regular passenger itineraries from Piraeus and Athens to Lamia and Stylida were suspended and only the periodic summer excursion itineraries for the transport of bathers to the beach of Agia Marina and the commercial itineraries remained.

In 1991 the line Athens Leianokladi-Lamia-Stylida is reopened with passenger trains and freight services. In 2011 the passenger operation of the line is transformed into a suburban line with 12 pairs of routes, 7 between Leianokladi-Lamia-Stylida and the remaining 5 between Leianokladi-Lamia, the connecting bus that connected the OSE agency in Lamia with the Leianokladi station.

In 2017 OSE's passenger transport sector was privatised as TrainOSE, currently a wholly owned subsidiary of Ferrovie dello Stato Italiane infrastructure, including stations, remained under the control of OSE. On 16 March 2020, in the midst of the 2020 coronavirus pandemic, it was decided to suspend services (trains and bus lines) temporarily. On 1 July 2020, the railway line reopened with the measures envisaged for the coronavirus. In July 2022, the line began being served by Hellenic Train, the rebranded TranOSE.

== Stations ==
- Leianokladi
- Lamias
- Kalivia
- Revenia
- Pagrati
- Lamia
- Roditsa
- Megali Vrysi
- Agia Marina
- Vasiliki
- Stylida
