= Sosthenis =

Town in Oetaea in ancient Thessaly

Coordinates: 38°49′11″N 22°25′22″E

Sosthenis (Ancient Greek: Σωσθενίς) was a town in Oetaea in ancient Thessaly. The town's name appears in an epigraph dated to c. 272-260 BCE, as providing a treasurer on behalf of the Aetolians in making an alliance with the Acarnanians.

Modern scholars tentatively locate Sosthenis at the modern site of Vardates.
