= Makrakomi =

Makrakomi Μακρακώμη
- Municipality
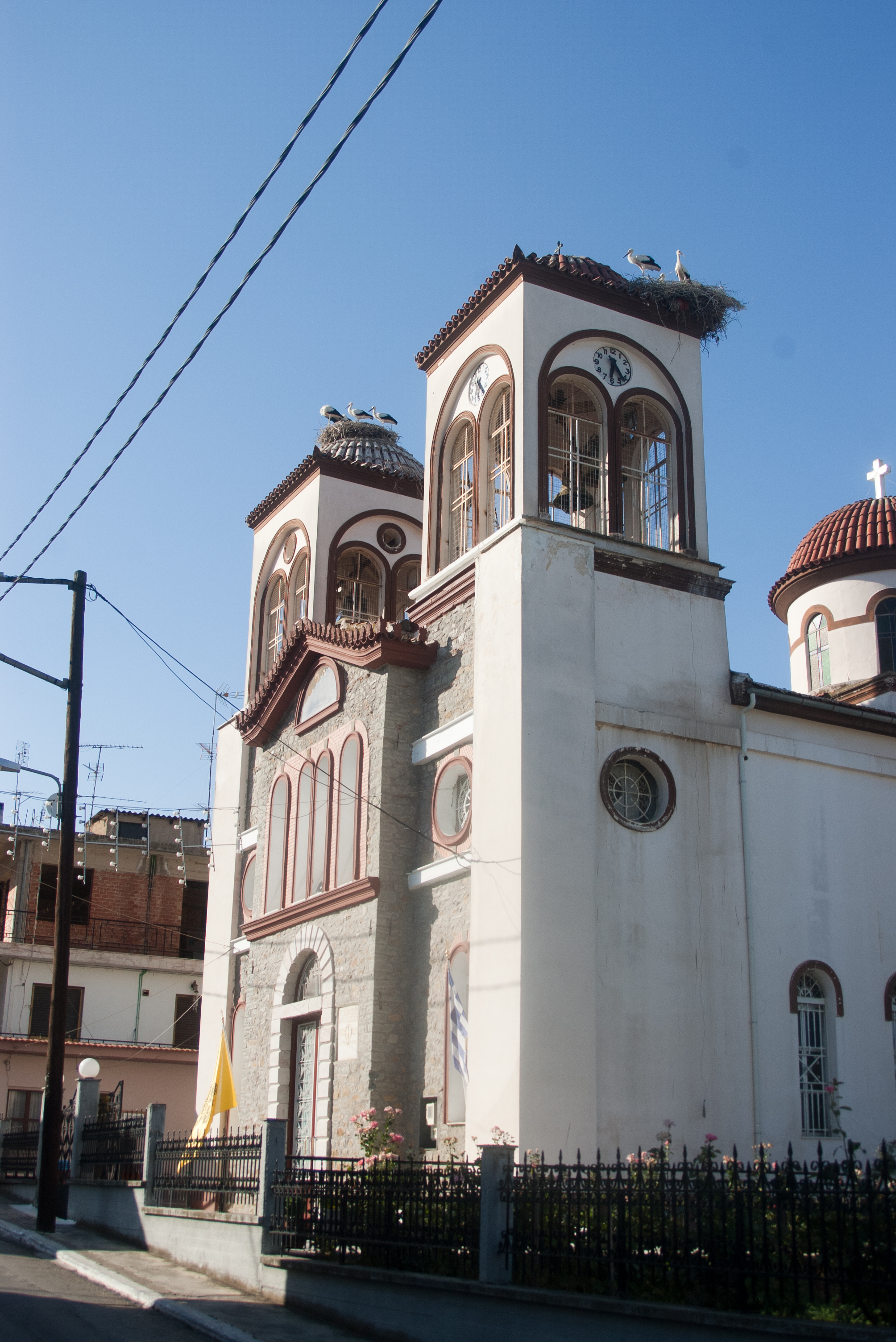

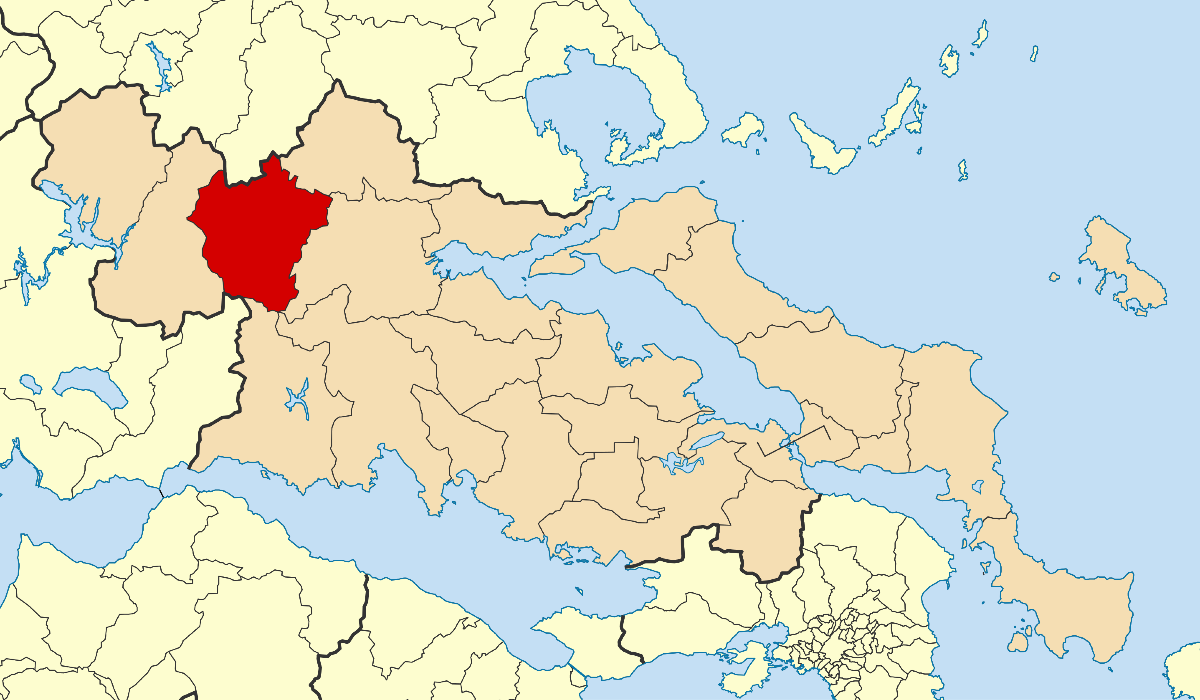

- Location within Greece
- Coordinates: 38°56′N 22°7′E
- Country: Greece
- Administrative region: Central Greece
- Regional unit: Phthiotis

Area
  - Municipality: 836.6 km^{2} (323.0 sq mi)
  - Municipal unit: 271.3 km^{2} (104.7 sq mi)
- Elevation: 15 m (49 ft)

Population (2021)
  - Municipality: 13,500
  - Density: 16.1/km^{2} (41.8/sq mi)
  - Municipal unit: 4,720
  - Municipal unit density: 17.4/km^{2} (45.1/sq mi)
  - Community: 1,768
- Time zone: UTC+2 (EET)
  - Summer (DST): UTC+3 (EEST)
- Postal code: 350 11
- Area code: 22360
- Vehicle registration: ΜΙ
- Website: www.makrakomi.gr

Makrakomi (Greek: Μακρακώμη) is a town and a municipality in the western part of the Phthiotis regional unit, in Greece. The seat of the municipality is the town Spercheiada.

== Geography ==
Makrakomi is built on the southern slopes of Western Othrys at an altitude of 280 m. It overlooks the river Spercheios and its valley. Makrakomi is located east of Karpenisi, ENE of Agrinio, south of Karditsa, west of Lamia and WNW of Amfissa. Makrakomi is next to the EO38 national road, which connects Lamia with Agrinio and Thermo.

== Municipality ==
The Municipality of Makrakomi was formed at the 2011 local government reform by the merger of the following 4 former municipalities, that became municipal units (constituent communities in brackets):

- Agios Georgios Tymfristou (Agios Georgios, Dikastro, Mavrilo, Megali Kapsi, Merkada, Mesaia Kapsi, Neochori, Palaiokastro, Perivlepto, Pitsiota, Ptelea, Vitoli)
- Makrakomi (Archani, Asvesti, Giannitsou, Grammeni, Kastri, Litoselo, Makrakomi, Makri, Palaia Giannitsou, Pappa, Platystomo, Rovoliari, Trilofo, Tsoukka)
- Spercheiada (Agios Sostis, Anatoli, Argyria, Fteri, Gardiki, Kallithea, Kampia, Kanalia, Kloni, Kolokythia, Kyriakochori, Lefkada, Marmara, Mesopotamia, Nikolitsi, Palaiochori, Palaiovracha, Perivoli, Pitsi, Platanos, Pougkakia, Spercheiada)
- Tymfristos

The municipality has an area of 836.564 km^{2}, the municipal unit 271.298 km^{2}. In 2011 the population of Makrakomi municipal unit was assessed as 5,617 (2,825 male, 2,792 female).

== Historical population ==
Year	Community	Municipal unit	Municipality
1981	2,374	-	-
1991	2,717	7,262	-
2001	2,226	7,132	-
2011	2,245	5,617	16,036
2021	1,768	4,720	13,500

== History, monuments and sights ==
See Ainis.

Makrakomi: This market town bears the name of the ancient Aenian town "Makra Kome" [Long Town] whose ruins can be seen on the small hill Profitis Ilias. "Makra Kome" is mentioned by the historian Livy (Titus Livius) in his description of the destruction of Sperchias by the Aetolians (198 B.C) (see Macra Come). Sights include the church of Agia Paraskevi (set in an overgrown site with cypress trees), the Acropolis of Makrakomi (which affords a splendid view over the plain) and the hillock of Lavanitsa.

Platistomo: A picturesque bath town with natural springs (known to ancient Aenians). The waters of these springs are recommended for stomach and skin ailments.

Nea and Palea Gianitsou - Papas: There are traces of two ancient castles in this location.

Makri: A town square is located here, as well as the river Spercheios. The only station for nursing and protecting animals in Phthiotis is also located in Makri. The Greek Army general Ioannis Zisis was born at Makri in 1888.

Archani: Close to springs and therapeutic waters.

Asvestis: It has a vaulted bridge made of stone.

Trilofo: It features a religious museum "I Vivlos" ["The Bible"].

Kastri: It has a plane-tree forest on both sides of the Spercheios. The Castle is the most prominent building at the village centre.

Tsouka: The porch of Western Phthiotis. It features a fountain in the "chalkia gourna" ["brass basin"] while there are huge oak trees at Agios Giannis.

Litosselo: There is a folklore museum and a settlement called "Afentika" ["The Bosses"].

Rovoliari: There are ancient fir-trees, chestnut-tree woods and oak-tree woods, as well as a folklore museum.

== Food and entertainment ==
Local meat from free range animals and delicious sausages traditionally produced. Wine and raki from the mountainous vineyards of Makrakomi, Tsouka and Platistomo. Famous local produce includes kiwi berries from Kastri and shelled peanuts from Makri. The taverns and restaurants in Makrakomi and the surrounding villages serve kokoretsi, splinantero, kontosouvli (skewered and grilled meats) and other local specialities.

== Cultural and other events ==
Organized events in commemoration of the Battle of Makrakomi; three-day Carnival festivities in Makrakomi. Traditional festivals in Makrakomi (on Agiou Pnevmatos Day [Holy Ghost]) and all the other villages. Music nights, dedicated events, exhibitions and theatricals are also put on in summer.

== Notable people ==
- Lou Pappan (1930-2023) - restauntuer

== See also ==
- List of settlements in Phthiotis
