= Maliades =

Nymphs in Greek mythology

In Greek mythology, the Maliades (Μηλίδες), also known as the Spercheides (Ancient Greek: Σπερχειδες), were naiads of the Spercheus River, in Malis. They were sometimes held to be the daughters of the river god Spercheus and the naiad Deino, although Antoninus Liberalis reported the tradition that Cerambus was punished for making this claim.

== See also ==
- Maliya
