= Sperchiae =

Fortress in Ainis, ancient Thessaly

Coordinates: 38°55′22″N 22°01′58″E

Sperchiae or Sperchiai (Ancient Greek: Σπέρχεια) or Spercheiae or Spercheiai (Σπερχείαι) was a fortress in Ainis in ancient Thessaly, which, according to the description of Livy, would seem to have been situated at no great distance from the sources of the Spercheius. Ptolemy mentions a place Spercheia between Echinus and Thebes in Phthiotis; and Pliny the Elder places Sperchios in Doris. William Smith concludes it probable that these three names indicate the same place. Livy relates that the place was destroyed by the Aetolians in 198 BCE.

Sperchiae's site is at a place called Kastrorakhi.
