= Stylida railway station =

Railway station in Leianokladi, Greece

Στυλίδας Stylida
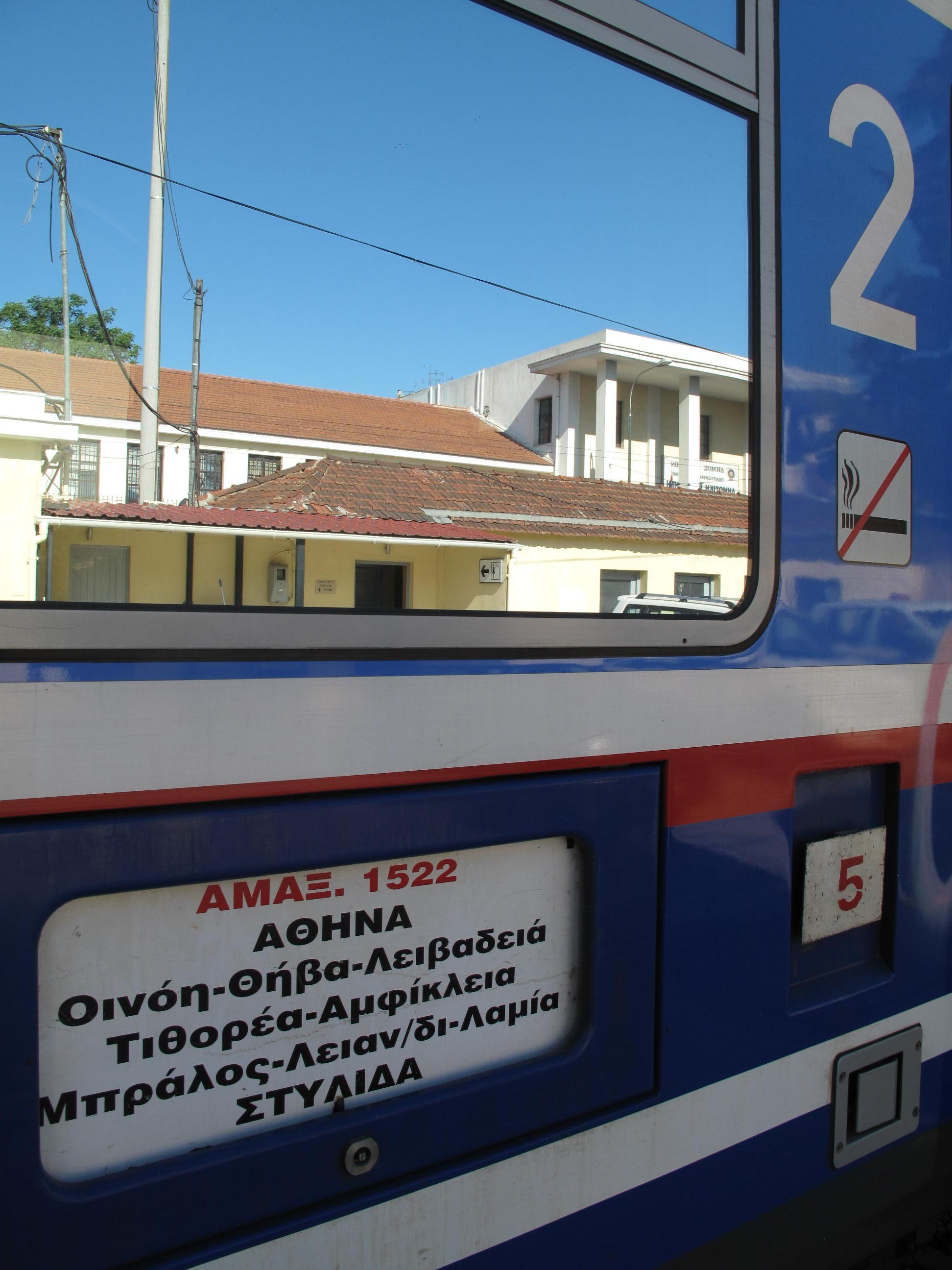
- The express service to Stylida, awaiting to depart, with the discontinued route of the former Hellas Express from Athens to Lianokladi (200 km) still fitted to the units door, July 2009

General information
- Location: 353 00 Stylida; Phthiotis; Greece
- Coordinates: 38°54′48″N 22°36′51″E
- Owner: GAIAOSE
- Line: Leianokladi–Stylida railway
- Platforms: 2 (1 in use)
- Tracks: 3 (1 siding)
- Train operators: Hellenic Train

Construction
- Structure type: at-grade
- Platform levels: 1
- Parking: Yes
- Cycle facilities: No

Other information
- Status: Staffed
- Website: http://www.ose.gr/en/

History
- Opened: 1905
- Closed: 1970 (seasonal)
- Rebuilt: 1991 (Normal services)
- Electrified: No

Services
Preceding station	Hellenic Train	Following station
Vassiliki towards Leianokladi	G2 Leianokladi-Stylida	Terminus
Location

Stylida railway station (Greek: Σιδηροδρομικός Σταθμός Στυλίδας, romanized: Sidirodromikós stathmós Stylídas) is a railway station in Greece. The station opened 1905, along with the rest of the line. It is served by Regional services to Leianokladi.

== History ==
The station opened 1905, along with the rest of the line. In 1920 the line became part of the Hellenic State Railways. In 1971, the Hellenic State Railways was reorganised into the OSE taking over responsibilities for most for Greece's rail infrastructure. However, by 1970 the regular passenger itineraries from Piraeus and Athens to Lamia and Stylida were suspended, and only the periodic summer excursion itineraries for the transport of bathers to the beach of Agia Marina and the commercial itineraries remained. In 1991, the line Athens Leianokladi-Lamia-Stylida is reopened with passenger trains and freight services.

In 2001 the infrastructure element of OSE was created, known as GAIAOSE; it would henceforth be responsible for the maintenance of stations, bridges and other elements of the network, as well as the leasing and the sale of railway assists. In 2005, TrainOSE was created as a brand within OSE to concentrate on rail services and passenger interface. In 2011 the passenger operation of the line is transformed into a suburban line with 12 pairs of routes, 7 between Leianokladi-Lamia-Stylida and the remaining 5 between Leianokladi-Lamia. This connecting bus connected the OSE agency in Lamia with the Leianokladi station.

In August 2025, the Greek Ministry of Infrastructure and Transport confirmed the creation of a new body, Greek Railways (Greek: Σιδηρόδρομοι Ελλάδος, romanized: Ellinikí Sidiródromi Monoprósopi) to assume responsibility for rail infrastructure, planning, modernisation projects, and rolling stock across Greece. Previously, these functions were divided among several state-owned entities: OSE, which managed infrastructure; ERGOSÉ, responsible for modernisation projects; and GAIAOSÉ, which owned stations, buildings, and rolling stock. OSE had overseen both infrastructure and operations until its vertical separation in 2005. Rail safety has been identified as a key priority. The merger follows the July approval of a Parliamentary Bill to restructure the national railway system, a direct response to the Tempi accident of February 2023, in which 43 people died after a head-on collision.

== Facilities ==
The station has waiting rooms and staffed booking office within the original brick-built station building. The station has a buffet. Basic shelters are located on Platform 2 and digital display screens on both platforms. There is a taxi rank in the forecourt, with a postbox at the front entrance. However, there is no onsite parking at the station.

== Services ==
It is served by Regional services to Leianokladi. The station sees around 8 trains per day.

== Station layout ==
Ground level	Customer service	Exit/Tickets
Level; Ε1	Side platform, doors will open on the right
Level; Ε1	Platform 1	towards Leianokladi (Vassiliki) →
Level; Ε1	Platform 2	towards Leianokladi (Vassiliki) →
Level; Ε1	Side platform, doors will open on the right/left
