= Tymfristos, Greece =

Tymfristos Τυμφρηστός
- Municipal unit
- Location within the regional unit

- Location within Greece
- Coordinates: 38°57′N 21°49′E
- Country: Greece
- Administrative region: Central Greece
- Regional unit: Phthiotis
- Municipality: Makrakomi

Area
  - Municipal unit: 28.68 km^{2} (11.07 sq mi)

Population (2021)
  - Municipal unit: 385
  - Municipal unit density: 13.4/km^{2} (34.8/sq mi)
- Time zone: UTC+2 (EET)
  - Summer (DST): UTC+3 (EEST)
- Vehicle registration: ΜΙ

Tymfristos (Greek: Τυμφρηστός) is a village and a former community in Phthiotis, Greece. Since the 2011 local government reform it is part of the municipality Makrakomi, of which it is a municipal unit. The municipal unit has an area of 28.681 km^{2}. Population 385 (2021).
