= Phthiotis =

Phthiotis Περιφερειακή ενότητα Φθιώτιδας
- Regional unit
- Municipalities of Phthiotis

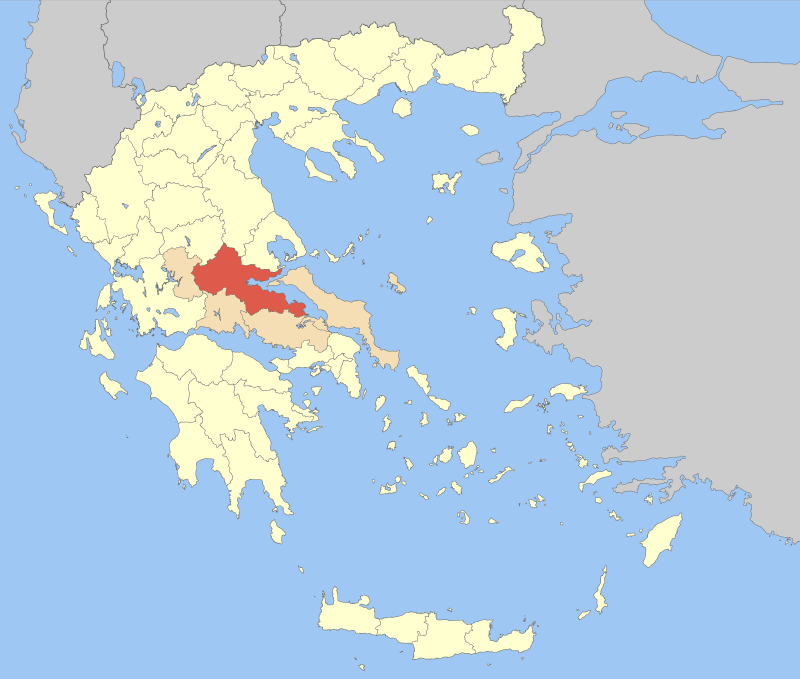
- Phthiotis within Greece

- Location within Greece
- Coordinates: 38°54′N 22°32′E
- Country: Greece
- Administrative region: Central Greece
- Seat: Lamia

Area
  - Total: 4,440 km^{2} (1,710 sq mi)

Population (2021)
  - Total: 137,793
  - Density: 31.0/km^{2} (80.4/sq mi)
- Time zone: UTC+2 (EET)
  - Summer (DST): UTC+3 (EEST)
- Postal code: 35x xx
- Area code: 223x0
- Vehicle registration: ΜΙ

Phthiotis (Greek: Φθιώτιδα, Fthiótida [fθi'otiða]; ancient Greek and Katharevousa: Φθιῶτις) is one of the regional units of Roumeli, Greece. It is part of the administrative region of Central Greece. The capital is the city of Lamia. It is bordered by the Malian Gulf to the east, Boeotia in the south, Phocis in the south, Aetolia-Acarnania in the southwest, Evrytania in the west, Karditsa regional unit in the north, Larissa regional unit in the north, and Magnesia in the northeast. The name dates back to ancient Achaea Phthiotis and Homeric Phthia, which is best known as the home of Achilles.

== Geography ==
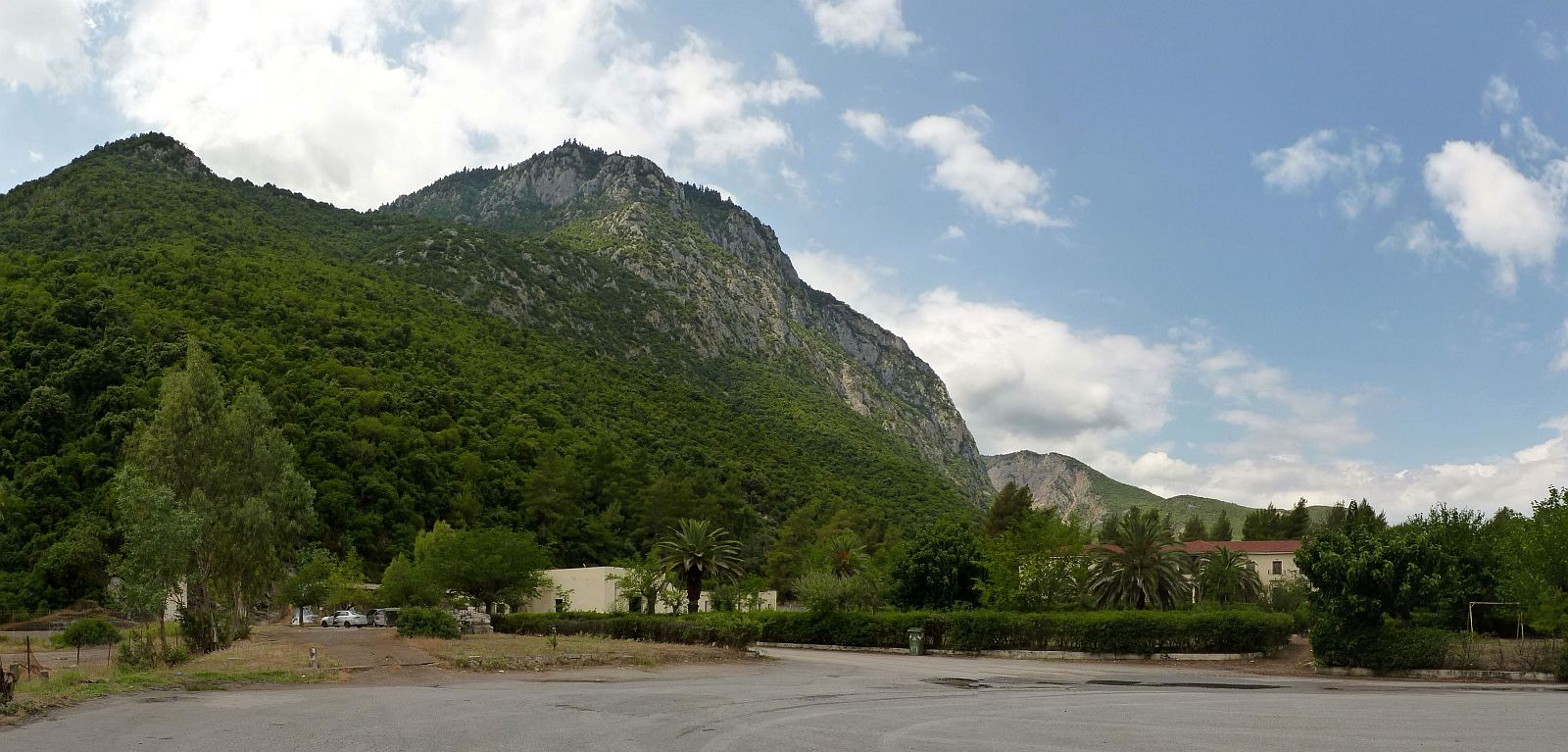
Thermopylae pass

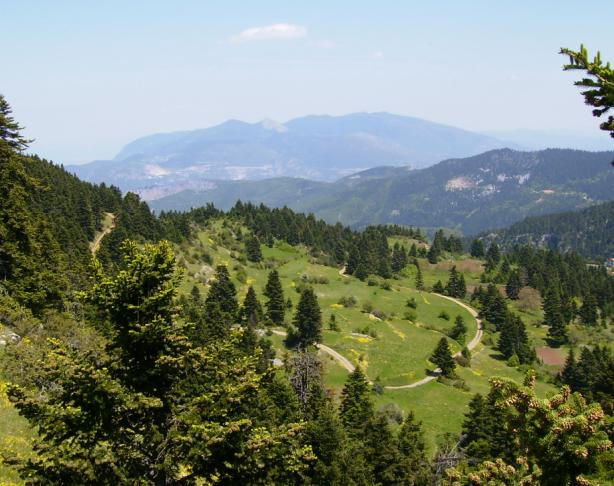
Mount Oeta

Phthiotis covers the northern and southern shorelines of the Malian Gulf, an inlet of the Aegean Sea. It stretches inland towards the west along the valley of the river Spercheios. In the south it covers the upper part of the Cephissus valley. There are several mountain ranges in Phthiotis, including the Othrys in the northeast, the Tymfristos in the west, the Vardousia in the southwest, Oeta in the south and the Kallidromo in the southeast.

== History ==
=== Mythology ===
"Phthiotis" derives its name from "the region of Phthia", the Homeric home of Achilles, possibly located in the southernmost region of ancient Thessaly around Pharsalus. The Catalogue of Ships in Iliad speaks of Achilles' kingdom (Hom. Il. 2.680-5):

Now again all those who dwelt in Pelasgic Argos:
those who dwelt in Alos and Alope and Trachis
and those who held Phthia and Hellas with its fair women,
and who were called Myrmidons and Hellenes and Achaians;
of those fifty ships the leader was Achilles.

These names are generally believed to have referred to places mostly in the Spercheios valley in what is now Phthiotis in Central Greece.

In Classical times, Phthiotis referred to the region of Achaea Phthiotis, which bordered Thessalian Phthiotis from the south and east. Achaea Phthiotis covered the northern part of the present-day regional unit of Phthiotis and the southern part of present-day Magnesia (regional unit).

The southeastern part of present-day Phthiotis covered the ancient region of Opuntian Locris. The southwestern part was ancient Malis and Ainis.

== Transport ==
The Piraeus–Platy and Leianokladi–Stylida railways pass through Phthiotis, with both lines meeting at Leianokladi. Other main train stations in the regional unit include Lamia and Stylida, both on the Leianokladi–Stylida railway.

Phthiotis also has two motorways, the A1 (part of European routes E65 and E75) and A3, with the A3 branching off the A1 near Anthili. Many national roads pass through the regional unit as well, including the EO1, EO1a, EO3, EO27, EO38, the Lamia Eastern Bypass and the Thermopylae–Antirrio National Road.

== Administration ==
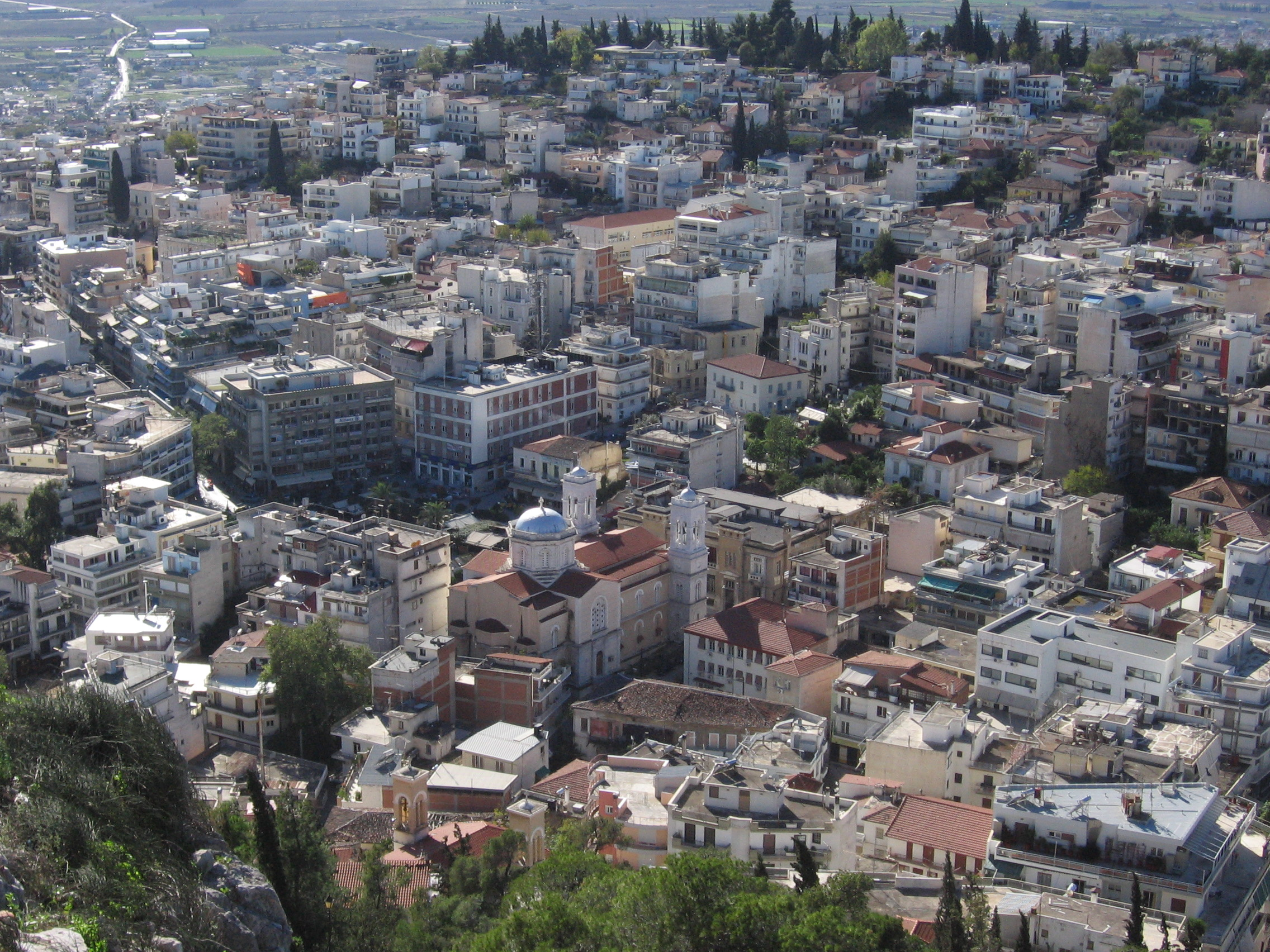
Lamia

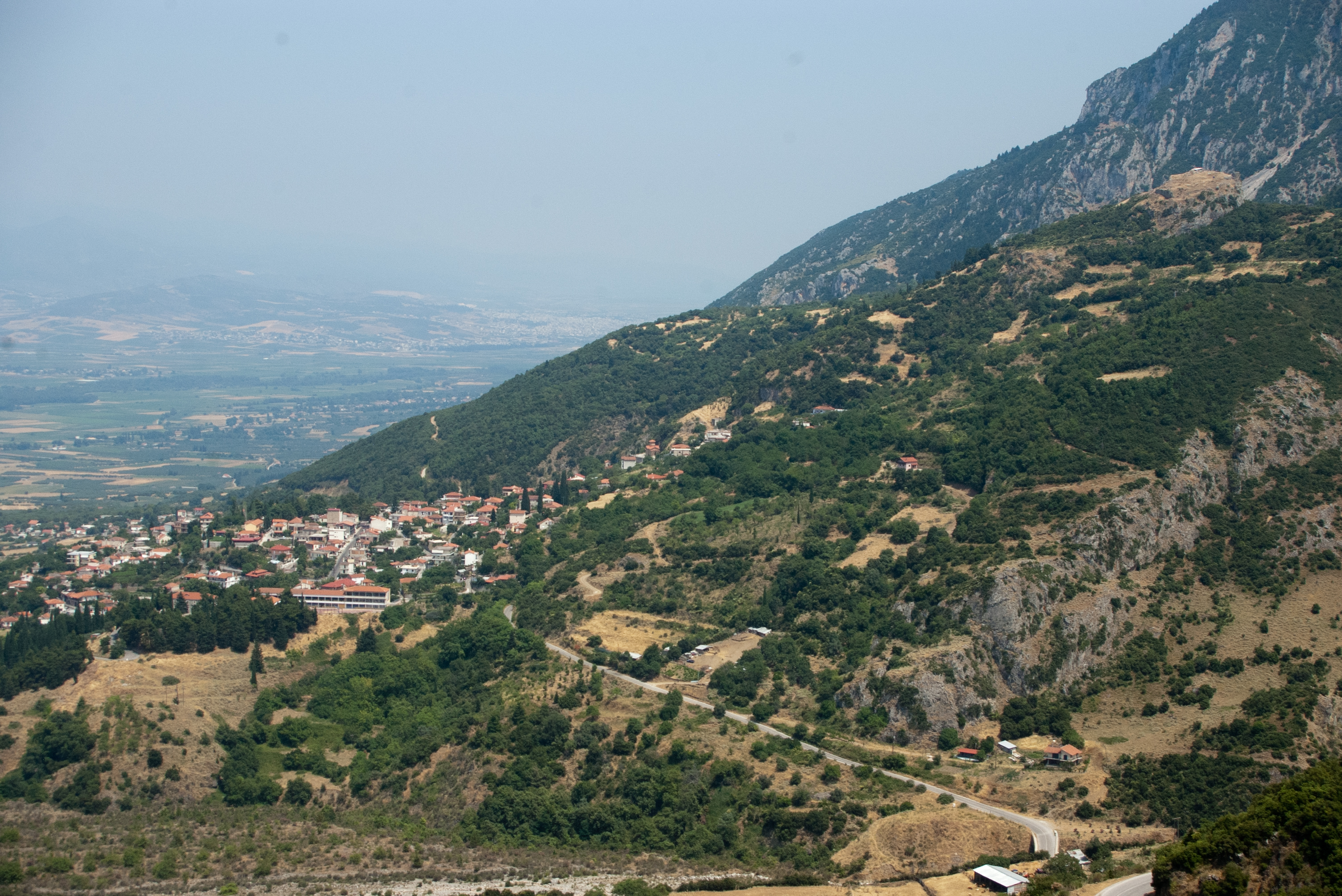
Ypati

The regional unit Phthiotis is subdivided into 7 municipalities. These are (number as in the map in the infobox):

- Amfikleia-Elateia (2)
- Domokos (3)
- Kamena Vourla (6)
- Lamia (1)
- Lokroi (4)
- Makrakomi (5)
- Stylida (7)

=== Prefecture ===
The prefecture Phthiotis and Phocis was created in 1845. In 1947 this prefecture was split into the southern part Phocis and the northern part Phthiotis. As a part of the 2011 Kallikratis government reform, the regional unit Phthiotis was created out of the former prefecture Phthiotis (Greek: Νομός Φθιώτιδας). The prefecture had the same territory as the present regional unit. At the same time, the municipalities were reorganised, according to the table below.

New municipality	Old municipalities	Seat
Amfikleia-Elateia	Amfikleia	Kato Tithorea
Amfikleia-Elateia	Elateia	Kato Tithorea
Amfikleia-Elateia	Tithorea	Kato Tithorea
Domokos	Domokos	Domokos
Domokos	Thessaliotida	Domokos
Domokos	Xyniada	Domokos
Kamena Vourla	Agios Konstantinos	Kamena Vourla
Kamena Vourla	Kamena Vourla	Kamena Vourla
Kamena Vourla	Molos	Kamena Vourla
Lamia	Lamia	Lamia
Lamia	Gorgopotamos	Lamia
Lamia	Leianokladi	Lamia
Lamia	Pavliani	Lamia
Lamia	Ypati	Lamia
Lokroi	Atalanti	Atalanti
Lokroi	Dafnousia	Atalanti
Lokroi	Malesina	Atalanti
Lokroi	Opountioi	Atalanti
Makrakomi	Makrakomi	Spercheiada
Makrakomi	Agios Georgios Tymfristou	Spercheiada
Makrakomi	Spercheiada	Spercheiada
Makrakomi	Tymfristos	Spercheiada
Stylida	Stylida	Stylida
Stylida	Echinaioi	Stylida
Stylida	Pelasgia	Stylida

=== Provinces ===
- Province of Domokos - Domokos
- Province of Phthiotis - Lamia
- Province of Locris - Atalanti

Note: Provinces no longer hold any legal status in Greece.

== Persons ==
- Aris Velouchiotis, leader of ELAS
- Thanos Livaditis (1934–2005)
- Dimitrios Holevas

== Sporting teams ==
- Lamia
- Ionikos Lamias BC

== See also ==
- List of traditional Greek place names
- List of settlements in Phthiotis
