= Spercheios =

River in central Greece

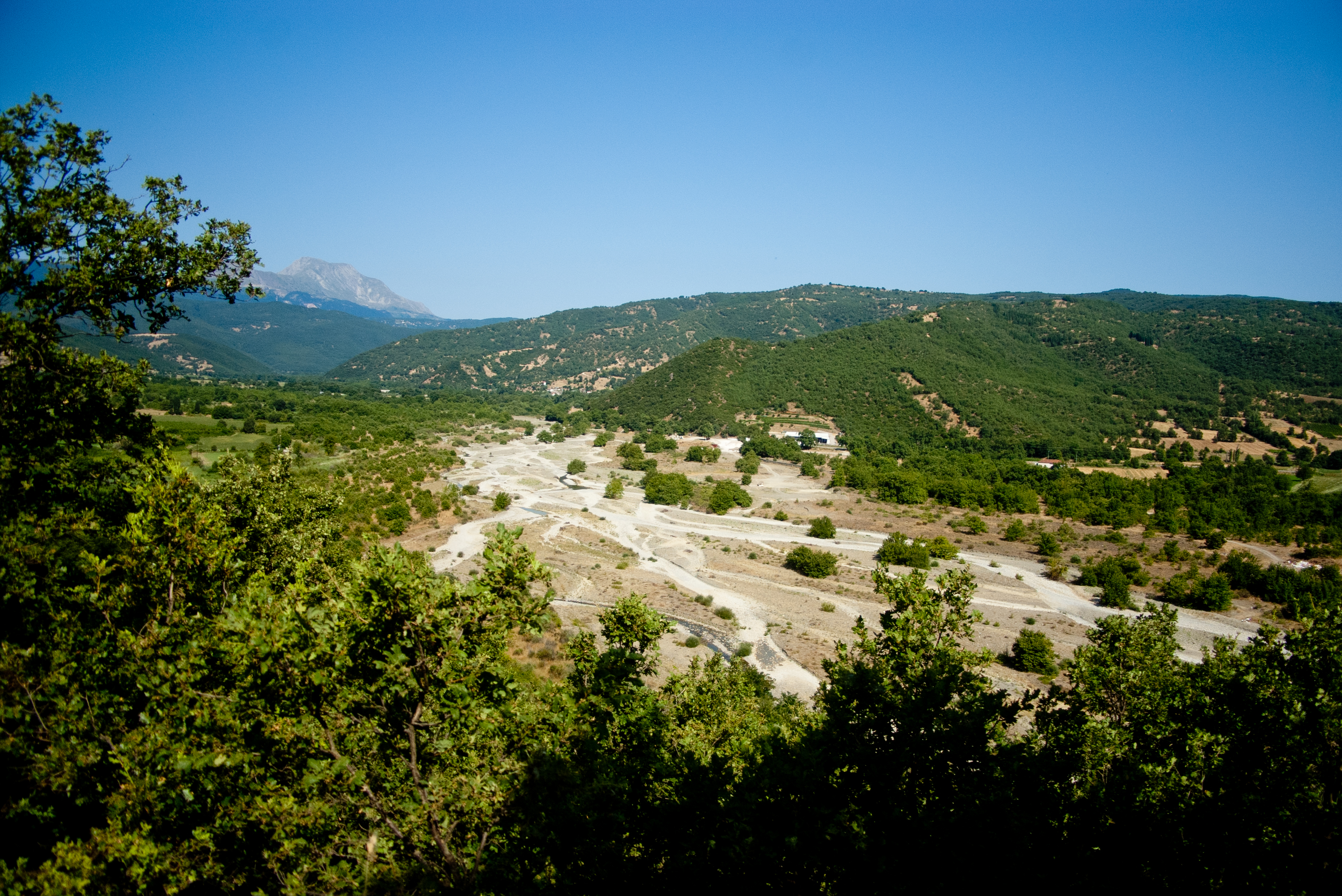
- The river Spercheios at Vitoli, Makrakomi

Location
- Country: Greece

Physical characteristics
- Source
  - location: Tymfristos
- Mouth
  - location: Malian Gulf, Aegean Sea
  - coordinates: 38°51′50″N 22°34′35″E
- Length: 80 km (50 mi)
- Basin size: 1,830 km^{2} (710 sq mi)

The Spercheios (Greek: Σπερχειός, Sperkheiós), also known as the Spercheus from its Latin name, is a river in Phthiotis in central Greece. It is 80 km (50 mi) long, and its drainage area is 1,830 km^{2} (710 sq mi). It was worshipped as a god in the ancient Greek religion and appears in some collections of Greek mythology. In antiquity, its upper valley was known as Ainis. In AD 997, its valley was the site of the Battle of Spercheios, which ended Bulgarian incursions into the Byzantine Empire.

It is referenced in a surviving fragment of Aeschylus' play Philoctetes, quoted in The Frogs, as a place for cattle.

== River ==
The river begins in the Tymfristos mountains on the border with Evrytania and flows to the east through the village Agios Georgios Tymfristou, entering a wide plain. It flows along the towns Makrakomi and Leianokladi, and south of the Phthiotidan capital Lamia. The river flows through an area of former wetlands, that have been reclaimed for agriculture. It empties into the Malian Gulf of the Aegean Sea 13 kilometers (8 mi) southeast of Lamia. In antiquity, the mouth of the river was the site of Antikyra, which was famed for its black and white hellebore.

Several studies have been conducted regarding the river's hydrological regime. Its silt has slowly filled the Malian Gulf, turning Thermopylae from a narrow pass into a wide plain.

== God ==
Homer's Iliad names the river as the father (by Achilles's half-sister Polydora) of Menesthius, one of Achilles's lieutenants. Antoninus Liberalis notes the tradition that Cerambus was punished for claiming that the nymphs of Mount Othrys, the Spercheides, were the daughters of Spercheios by the naiad Deino. Antoninus Liberalis also relates the account that Spercheios and Polydora's son was Dryops, king of Oeta, who fathered Dryope.
