= Agios Georgios Tymfristou =

Agios Georgios Tymfristou Άγιος Γεώργιος Τυμφρηστού
- Municipal unit
- Location within the regional unit

- Location within Greece
- Coordinates: 38°57′N 21°57′E
- Country: Greece
- Administrative region: Central Greece
- Regional unit: Phthiotis
- Municipality: Makrakomi

Area
  - Municipal unit: 157.064 km^{2} (60.643 sq mi)

Population (2021)
  - Municipal unit: 1,865
  - Municipal unit density: 11.87/km^{2} (30.75/sq mi)
  - Community: 678
- Time zone: UTC+2 (EET)
  - Summer (DST): UTC+3 (EEST)
- Vehicle registration: ΜΙ

Agios Georgios Tymfristou (Greek: Άγιος Γεώργιος Τυμφρηστού) is a village and a former municipality in Phthiotis, Greece. Since the 2011 local government reform it is part of the municipality Makrakomi, of which it is a municipal unit. The municipal unit has an area of 157.064 km^{2}. Population 1,865 (2021).
