= Mount Othrys =

Mountain range in eastern Central Greece

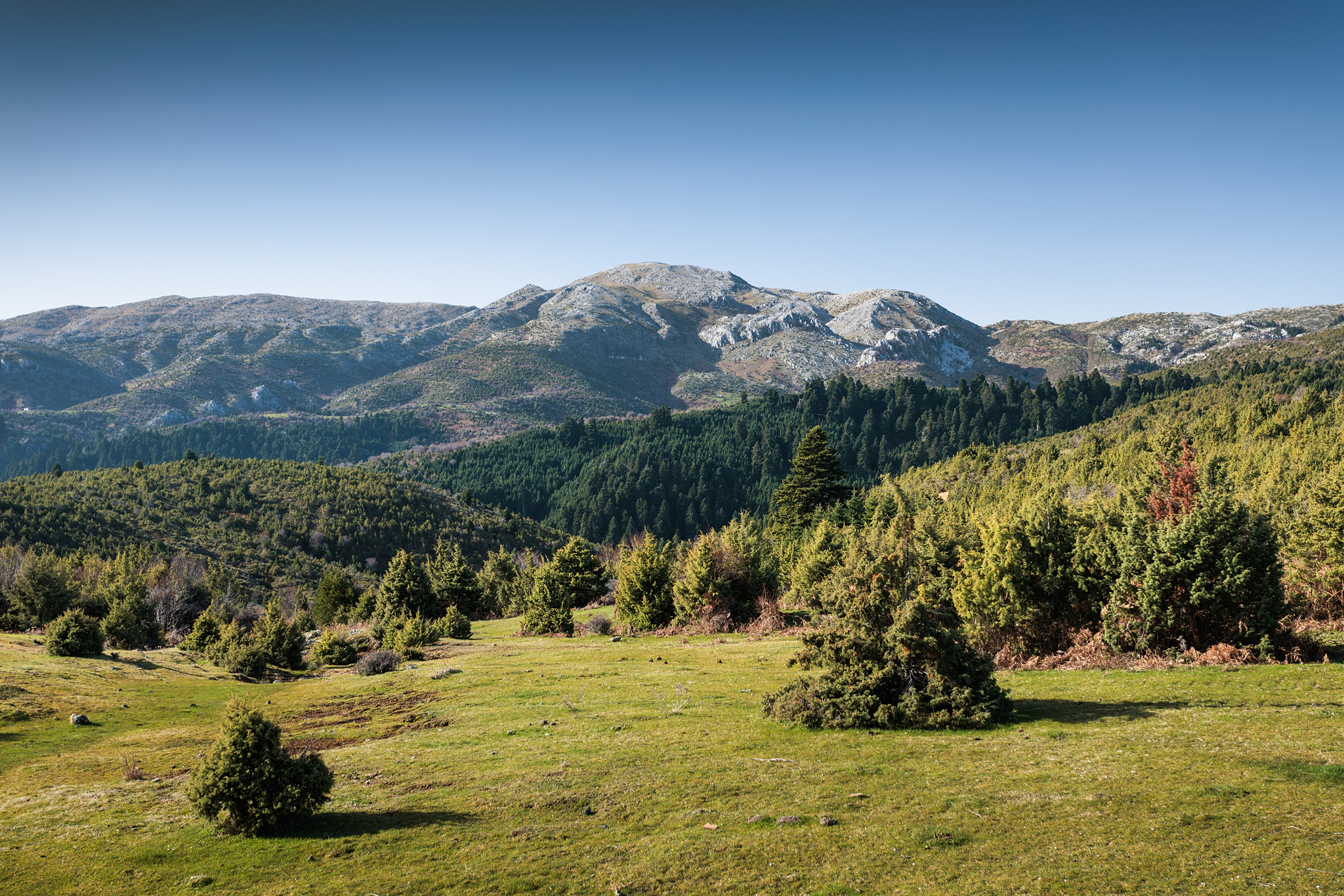

Highest point
- Elevation: 1,726 m (5,663 ft)
- Prominence: 1,098 m (3,602 ft)
- Listing: Ribu
- Coordinates: 39°1′1″N 22°42′35″E

Geography
- Location within Greece
- Location: Phthiotis and Magnesia, Greece

Mount Othrys (Greek: όρος Όθρυς – oros Othrys, also Όθρη – Othri) is a mountain range of central Greece, in the northeastern part of Phthiotis and southern part of Magnesia. Its highest summit, Gerakovouni, situated on the border of Phthiotis and Magnesia, is 1,726 m (5,663 ft) above sea level. The population density in the mountains is low: there are a few small villages, including Anavra in the northwest, Kokkotoi in the northeast, Palaiokerasia in the south and Neraida in the southwest. The length from west to east is about 35 km (22 mi) and the width from north to south is about 25 km (16 mi). The Pagasetic Gulf lies to the northeast, and the Malian Gulf lies to the south. The summit Gerakovouni lies 19 km (12 mi) south of Almyros, 27 km (17 mi) northeast of Lamia and 44 km (27 mi) southwest of Volos. The peaks of the range are above the tree line. The main mineral constituent of the rock is ophiolite.

A Natura 2000 protected area has been defined over much, but not all, of the range according to the Birds Directive. Of interest to the government is the protection of the raptors and the prevention of clear-cutting and other settlement measures that would destroy their traditional habitat. The area, named Oros Othrys, Vouna Gkouras kai Farangi Palaio Kerasias, ID GR1430006, includes the eastern range, a spur to the south to cover Palaiokerasia Gorge, and a spur to the north to cover Gkouras Hill.

On February 5, 1991, a Lockheed C-130H Hercules 748 crashed into the mountain, killing 63 people.

== Greco-Roman mythology ==
In Greek mythology, Mount Othrys was the base of Cronus and Rhea and the other Titans and Titanesses during the ten-year war with the Olympians known as the Titanomachy. It was also the birthplace of the gods and goddesses who are children of Cronus and Rhea: Hestia, Demeter, Hera, Hades, Poseidon, Zeus. It was assaulted by the Olympians against the Othrysians, led by Cronus and Rhea's six sons and daughters. The Olympians later overthrew and restored the Othrysians and both gained dominion in all of heaven and earth.

== Tunnel ==
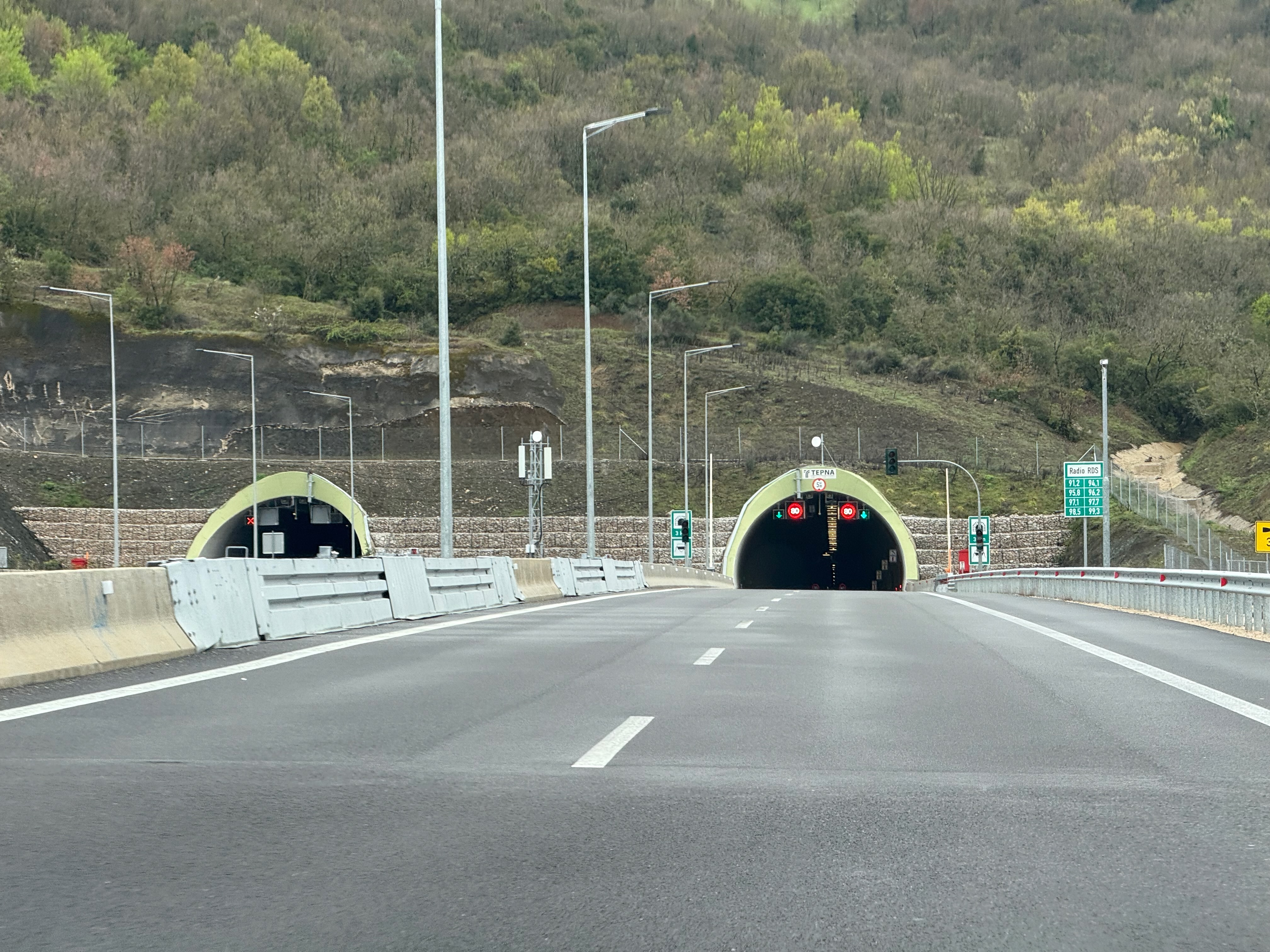
The western portal of the Othrys Tunnel, heading eastbound on A3 towards Lamia in April 2025.

Othrys Tunnel (Greek: Σήραγγα Όθρυος) is a tunnel 2.9 km (1.8 mi) long located in the southern section of the A3 (Central Greece) motorway, between Lamia and Xyniada. It passes underneath Othrys mountain. Work began in 2008, along with the rest of the motorway, but stopped in 2011 because of the Greek government-debt crisis. Construction resumed in 2019, along with the rest of the southern section. Its construction has faced challenges. It is the longest road tunnel of the A3, and it will be one of the longest in Greece. The tunnel has already been excavated on both sides, as of October 2021.
