= Phthiotic Thebes =

City and polis in ancient Thessaly, Greece

Coordinates: 39°16′08″N 22°45′29″E

Phthiotic Thebes (Ancient Greek: Θῆβαι Φθιώτιδες, romanized: Thebai Phthiotides or Φθιώτιδες Θήβες or Φθιώτιδος Θήβες; Latin: Thebae Phthiae) or Thessalian Thebes (Θῆβαι Θεσσαλικαἰ, Thebai Thessalikai) was a city and polis in ancient Thessaly, Greece; its site was north of the modern village of Mikrothives and its harbour was at Pyrasus.

== History ==
The city was located in the northeastern corner of the district of Phthiotis at the northern end of the ancient Crocus Field, to the north of the Pagasetic Gulf, at the distance of 300 stadia from Larissa. Evidence of human habitation on the site dates back to the Stone Age, but the city is not mentioned by name until the 4th century BCE. Strabo placed it at 20 stadia distant from Pyrasus and near Phylace. Its territory was bounded on the north by Pherae, on the northeast by Amphanae, on the east by Pyrasus, on the south by Halos, southwest with Peuma, and west with Eretria and Pharsalus. There was a sanctuary of Athena in the border territory with Halos, a city with which Thebes shared it. An inscription of the late fourth century BCE attests to the presence of a cult of Athena Polias. Furthermore, Athena Ileia, Demeter Panachaea, Protesilaus, Nike, and Leucothea were worshipped.

In the late 4th century BCE, the city was joined (synoecism) with the neighbouring cities of Phylace and Pyrasos. The new conurbation retained the name of Phthiotic or Thessalian Thebes, and became the main city of the Phthiotic Achaean League until it joined the Aetolian League in the late 3rd century BCE. Professor John Grainger of the University of Birmingham concluded, from evidence relating to the election of men from Thebes to office in the Aetolian League, that the city became a member of the League in the 220s BCE.

It is not mentioned in the Iliad, but it was at a later time the most important maritime city in Thessaly, till the foundation of Demetrias, by Demetrius Poliorcetes, about 294 BCE. In the war between Demetrius Poliorcetes and Cassander, in 302 BCE, Thebes was one of the strongholds of Cassander. It is mentioned in 282 BCE, as the only Thessalian city, except Pelinnaeum, that did not take part in the Lamian War.

It became at a later time the chief possession of the Aetolians in northern Greece; but it was wrested from them, after an obstinate siege, by Philip V of Macedon in 217 BCE, who changed its name into Philippopolis (Greek: Φιλιππούπολις). Its inhabitants were enslaved, and the city became a Macedonian colony. Polybius tells how Philip laid siege to the city, first building three camps and then joining them up with lines of circumvallation. Though initially the city offered determined resistance the citizens surrendered when a section of the wall that Philip had mined collapsed.

It was attacked by the consul Titus Quinctius Flamininus, previous to the Battle of Cynoscephalae, 197 BCE, but without success. Following Philip's defeat by the Roman Republic in the Second Macedonian War, in 189 BCE Phthiotic Thebes again became capital of the restored Phthiotic Achaean League. The name of Philippopolis was gradually dropped, though both names are used by Livy in narrating the transactions of the year 185 BCE. It continued to exist under the name of Thebes in the time of the Roman Empire, and is mentioned by Hierocles in the sixth century.

Under the Roman Empire, the city was moved from the inland site of the old Phthiotic Thebes back to Pyrasos. The old site was not abandoned, but for the remainder of the city's existence, its centre lay at the site of Pyrasos, where the harbour was also located. In Late Antiquity, it became part of the province of Thessaly, of which it was the third-most important city and main harbour. The city's prosperity from the 4th through the 6th centuries is attested by the number of its Early Christian monuments, but was brought to an end in a great fire in the late 7th century that destroyed the city. The city was rebuilt and apparently continued to be of some note in the early Byzantine period—its bishop is last mentioned in the 8th/9th century—but never recovered and was eventually eclipsed by the nearby port city of Halmyros.

== Archaeological remains ==
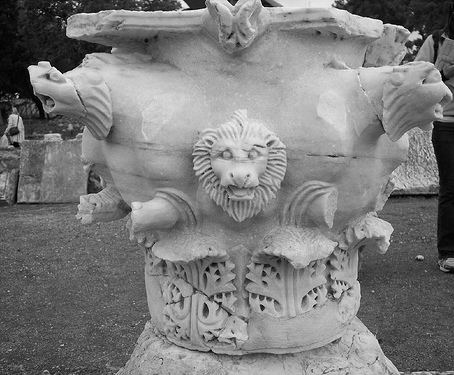
Capital from Basilica A of Phthiotic Thebes

According to the Oxford Dictionary of Byzantium, the site "is best known because of the many churches excavated there (nine basilicas have been found)". These include:

- Basilica A, a three-aisled basilica from the late 5th/early 6th century, dedicated to Saint Demetrius, which served as the cathedral church.
- Basilica B, or "Elpidios Basilica", also dating roughly to the late 5th/early 6th century.
- Basilica C, also known "Church of the archiereus Peter" based on a mid-6th century inscription, although it dates to the late 4th/early 5th century. It features "elaborate floor mosaics and is part of a vast ecclesiastical complex".
- Basilica D, a 7th-century cemetery church outside the city walls.

The original acropolis of Phthiotic Thebes was ringed by a Cyclopean wall. The later wall of the lower city is still largely extant, although in a ruined state. It features 40 towers and dates, according to Friedrich Stählin (Das hellenische Thessalien, 1924), to the 4th century BCE. Excavations on the acropolis have produced the foundations of a 9×12 m Classical-era temple, possibly dedicated to Athena Polias. This in turn was built with material from an earlier temple. In the lower city, the remains of the ancient theatre and a Hellenistic stoa can still be seen. Most of the finds are in the Archaeological Museum of Volos, with a few in the Almyros Museum.
