= Nea Anchialos =

Town in Thessaly, Greece

Nea Anchialos Νέα Αγχίαλος
- Municipal unit
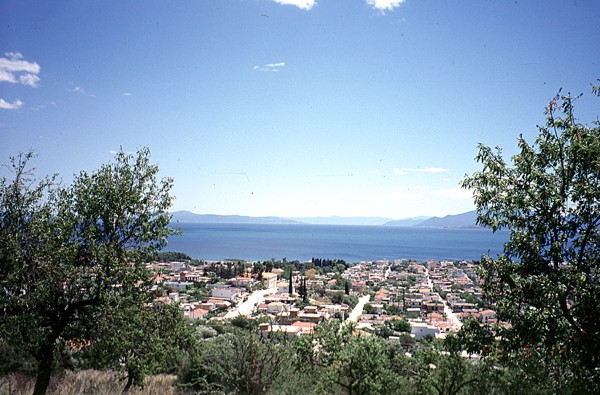
- Panoramic View from the hills surrounding Nea Anchialos

- Location within the regional unit

- Location within Greece
- Coordinates: 39°16′N 22°49′E
- Country: Greece
- Administrative region: Thessaly
- Regional unit: Magnesia
- Municipality: Volos
- City established: 1906 (120 years ago)

Area
  - Municipal unit: 80,462 km^{2} (31,067 sq mi)
- Elevation: 35 m (115 ft)

Population (2021)
  - Municipal unit: 5,881
  - Municipal unit density: 0.07309/km^{2} (0.1893/sq mi)
  - Community: 5,114
- Time zone: UTC+2 (EET)
  - Summer (DST): UTC+3 (EEST)
- Postal code: 374 00
- Area code: 24280
- Vehicle registration: ΒΟ
- Website: https://dimosvolos.gr/

Nea Anchialos (Greek: Νέα Αγχίαλος) is a town and a former municipality in Magnesia, Thessaly, Greece. Since the 2011 local government reform it is part of the municipality Volos, of which it is a municipal unit. It is situated southwest of Volos and north of Almyros, on the Pagasetic Gulf. The area of the municipal unit is 80,461 km^{2} (31,066.166 sq mi) and its population 5,881 people (2021).

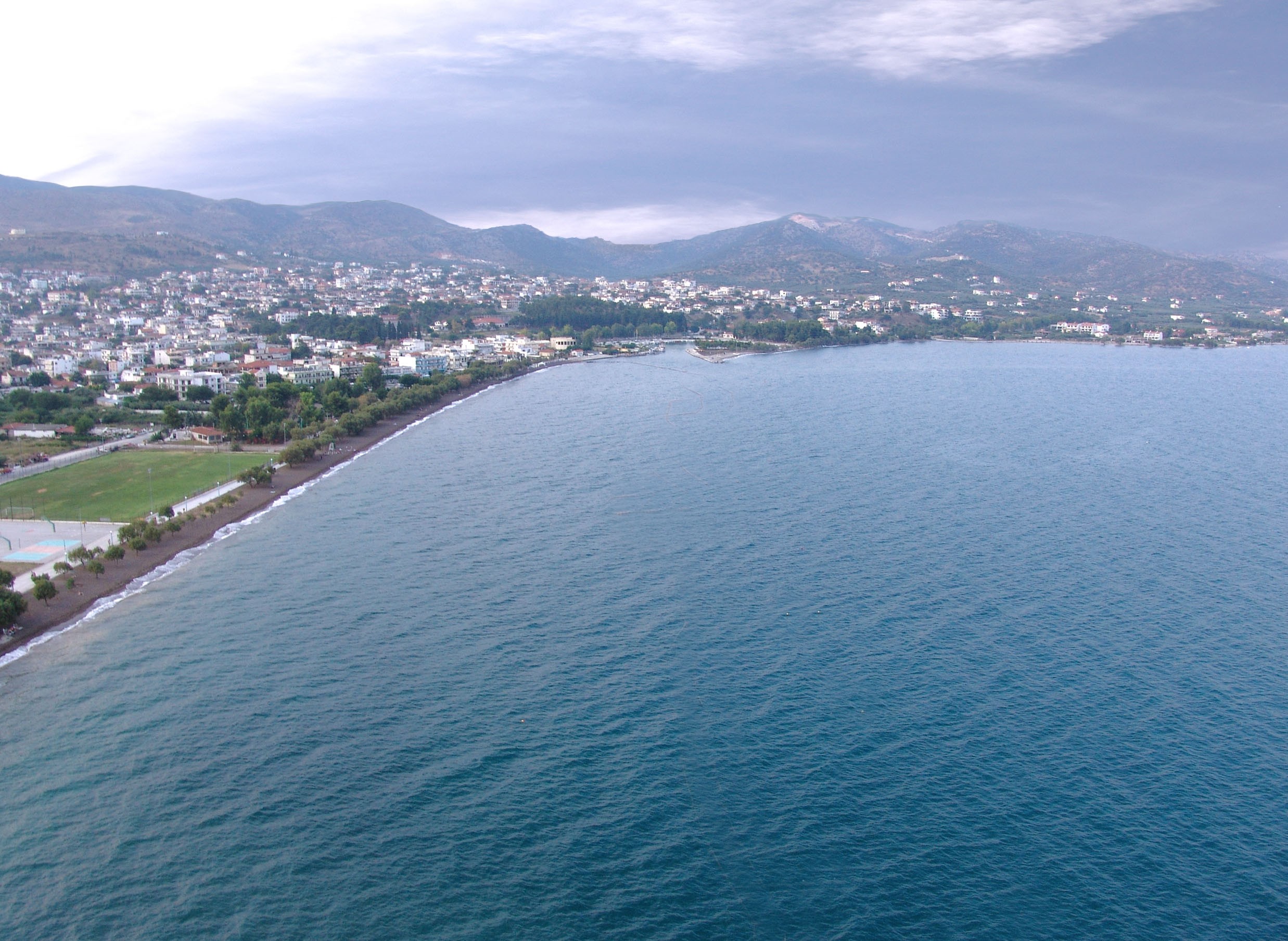
View of Anchialos from the Pagasetic Gulf

== History ==
=== Antiquity ===
The modern town is built on the ruins of the ancient city of Pyrasos (Πύρασος), and is associated with the nearby city of Thessalian or Phthiotic Thebes, near the modern village of Mikrothivai.

Homer mentions Pyrasos in his list of ships (Iliad B.695) together with Phylace and Itona, which belonged to the kingdom of Protesilaus. According to Strabo (IX.435), who discusses its topography, "well-harboured Pyrasos" (εὑλίμενος Πύρασος) was 20 stadia from Phthiotic Thebes.

Pyrasos is scarcely known from historical sources, except that it was an active harbour and featured a famous temple of Demeter and Kore, after which the harbour was later known as Demetrion. The only excavation which took place on the hill of Magoula, the old acropolis, southeast of Nea Anchialos, proves that the site was peopled since the earliest Neolithic period (6th millennium BC) by fishermen and agriculturalists. Archaeologically, the remains of Pyrasos are scant, and the city is barely known in historical times. An arm from an oversized statue, which came to light in 1965, was attributed to Demeter. Possibly the most significant find is a small fragment of an ancient epigraph, discovered in the debris of the big Basilica D with the name Pyrasos, confirming the location of the city.

In the late 4th century BC, Pyrasos was joined (synoecism) with the neighbouring cities of Phylake and Phthiotic Thebes. The new conurbation took the name of Phthiotic or Thessalian Thebes. The city remained prosperous under Roman rule, but it was moved from the inland site of the old Phthiotic Thebes back to Pyrasos near the sea. The city's prosperity from the 4th through the 6th centuries AD is attested by the number of its Early Christian monuments, but this was brought to an end in a great fire in the late 7th century that destroyed the city. The city was rebuilt and apparently continued to be of some note in the early Byzantine period—its bishop is last mentioned in the 8th/9th century—but it never recovered and it was eventually eclipsed by the nearby port city of Halmyros.

=== Nea Anchialos ===
Nea Anchialos was founded in 1906 by Greeks who fled the Black Sea town of Anchialos (modern Pomorie in Bulgaria) after massive anti-Greek riots, provoked by the Greek-Bulgarian struggle in Macedonia.

== Transportation ==
Nea Anchialos National Airport is named after the town, but the passenger terminal is near Almyros.

The EO30 road passes through Nea Anchialos: the road leads westbound to the A1 motorway and EO1 at Mikrothives, and eastbound to Volos. To the west of the town, the road intersects with the EO71, a military airport road to the air base in the National Airport.
