= Pyrasus =

Coordinates: 39°16′45″N 22°49′14″E

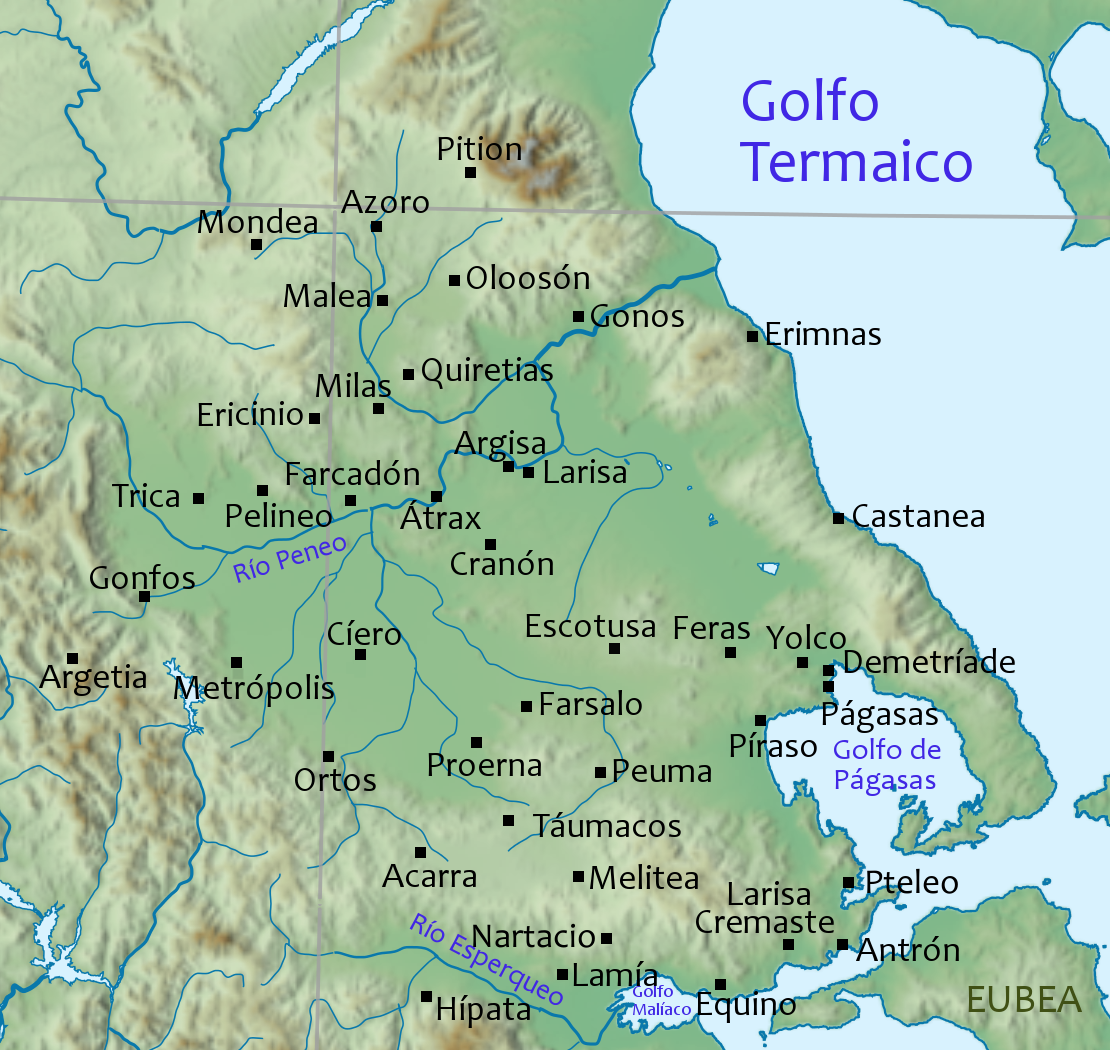
Cities of ancient Thessaly

Pyrasus or Pyrasos (Ancient Greek: Πύρασος or Πύρρασος) was a town and polis (city-state) of Phthiotis in ancient Thessaly, mentioned by Homer along with Phylace and Iton as ruled by Protesilaus, in the Catalogue of Ships in the Iliad, and described by him as "Πύρρασον ἀνθεμόεντα, Δήμητρος τέμενος" (Pyrasus having a temple of Demeter) Pyrasus was situated on the Pagasaean Gulf, at the distance of 20 stadia from Phthiotic Thebes, and possessed a good harbour. It had disappeared in the time of Strabo (fl. early first century CE), the town having moved to a nearby site, called Demetrium or Demetrion (Δημήτριον), derived from the temple of Demeter, spoken of by Homer, and which Strabo describes as distant two stadia from Pyrasus.

At the beginning of the Peloponnesian War, it was one of the cities of Thessaly that supplied aid to the Athenians.

At the end of the 4th century BCE, it was united (synoecism) with the neighboring cities of Phylace and Phthiotic Thebes to form a polis. The new conurbation took the name of Phthiotic Thebes, and became the main city of the Achaean Phthiotis League until it joined the Aetolian League at the end of the 3rd century BCE. Professor John Grainger of the University of Birmingham concluded, from evidence relating to the election of men from Thebes to office in the Aetolian League, that the city became a member of the League in the 220s BCE.

Until the construction of Demetrias by Demetrius Poliorcetes, it was the main port of the Pagasetic Gulf. It was destroyed in 217 BCE by the army of Philip V of Macedon, and its inhabitants were enslaved and the city became a Macedonian colony.

The site of Pyrasus is within the limits of Nea Anchialos. The only excavation that took place on the hill of Magoula, the ancient acropolis, southeast of Nea Anchialos, shows that the place was inhabited since the Neolithic (sixth millennium BCE) by fishermen and farmers. Stählin found a walled circuit covered by Byzantine remains near the top of the hill, and other walls similar at its foot. Archaeological remains are scarce and the city is barely known in historical times. An arm of a large statue, which came to light in 1965, was attributed to Demeter. Possibly the most important finding is a small fragment of an old epigraph, discovered in the remains of the great Basilica D with the name Pyrasus, which confirms the location of the town.
