= Senatus consultum =

Resolution of the ancient Roman Senate

A senatus consultum (Latin: decree of the senate, plural: senatus consulta) is a text emanating from the senate of Ancient Rome. It is used in the modern phrase senatus consultum ultimum.

Translated into French as sénatus-consulte, the term was also used during the French Consulate, the First French Empire and the Second French Empire.

== Republic ==
In the case of the ancient Roman Senate under the Roman Kingdom, it was simply an opinion expressed by the senate, such as the Senatus consultum Macedonianum or the Senatus consultum de Bacchanalibus. Under the Republic, it referred to a text promulgated by the senate on planned laws presented to the senate by a consul or praetor. Officially these consulta were merely advice given to the Republic's magistrates, but in practice magistrates often followed them to the letter. Despite only being an opinion, it was considered obligatory to have one before submitting the decision to a vote and moreover a hostile consultum from the senate almost systematically provoked the new law's abandonment or modification. If a consultum conflicted with a law promulgated by one of the Republic's legislative assemblies, the law took on a priority status and overrode the consultum. All proposed motions could be blocked by a veto from a tribune of the plebs or an intercessio by one of the executive magistrates. Each motion blocked by a veto was registered in the annals as senatus auctoritas (will of the senate). Each ratified motion finally became a senatus consultum. Each senatus auctoritas and each senatus consultum was transcribed in a document by the princeps senatus, which was then deposited in the Aerarium.

== Empire ==
Under the Roman Empire, the Roman legislative assemblies were rapidly neutralised. The first emperors transferred all legislative powers to the senate. After this transfer, the senatus consulta had the force of law. The senate's legislative power and right to issue consulta were suppressed in the 3rd century under the Dominate, in reference to the full powers conferred to the imperium. In the continued decline in praetorian law, the change rendered the emperor alone the guarantor of law and the Imperial constitution.

== List of senatus consulta ==
- Senatus consultum de Bacchanalibus (186 BC) – concerning the Bacchanalia
- Senatus consultum de privilegiis Delphorum (165 BC) – granted privileges to Delphi after a meeting of the senate called by the consul Gnaeus Octavius.
- Senatus consultum de Narthaciensibus et Melitaeensibus (c.140 BC) – border dispute between Narthakion and Melitaia, two Greek cities in Thessaly. The senate was presided by Gaius Hostilius Mancinus, praetor urbanus.
- Senatus consultum de Plarasensibus et Aphrodisiensibus (2 October 39 BC) – on the status of Plarasa and Aphrodisias in Caria. Engraved on the latter's Archival Wall.
- Senatus Consultum Calvisianum (4 BC) – composition of the extortion court by Augustus (with a jury only filled with senators).
- Senatus consultum Silanianum (AD 10) – on the torture of slaves in case of the murder of their master.
- Senatus Consultum de Cn. Pisone Patre (AD 20) – on the trial of Gnaeus Calpurnius Piso.
- Senatus consultum Vellaeanum (AD 46) – concerning intercedere
- Senatus consultum Claudianum (AD 52) – concerning slaves
- Senatus consultum Macedonianum – concerning loan/mutuum (time of Vespasian)
- Senatus consultum Neronianum (c. AD 100) – concerning legatum
- Senatus consultum Pegasianum (c. AD 100) – concerning fideicommissum
- Senatus consultum Tertullianum – concerning inheritance (time of Hadrian)
- Senatus consultum Orphitianum (c. AD 200) – concerning inheritance

== Bibliography ==
- Robert Byrd, The Senate of the Roman Republic, 1995, U.S. Government Printing Office, Senate Document 103-23;
- Polybius, History, book 6
- Frank Frost Abbott, A History and Description of Roman Political Institutions, 1901, Elibron Classics, ISBN 0-543-92749-0.
- Angelos Chaniotis, "Justifying territorial claims in classical and hellenistic Greece: the beginnings of international law", in Edward Monroe Harris, Lene Rubinstein (editors), The Law and the Courts in Ancient Greece, London, Duckworth, 2004, pp. 185–213. ISBN 0-7156-3117-9
- Etienne Famerie, "Aspects diplomatiques de la politique romaine dans l'orient grec (II^{e} s. av. J.-C.)", Ecole Pratique des Hautes Etudes, Annuaire, résumés des conférences et travaux, 144^{e} année, 2011-2012, pp. 46–52.
- Gary Forsythe, The historian L. Calpurnius Piso Frugi and the Roman annalistic tradition, Lanham, MD, 1994. ISBN 9780819197429
- Lintott, Andrew (1999). Constitution of the Roman republic. Oxford University Press. ISBN 978-0-19-926108-6. Reprinted 2009.
- Robert K. Sherk, Roman Document from the Greek East, Senatus Consulta and Epistulae to the Age of Augustus, Baltimore, The Johns Hopkins Press, 1969.
