= Narthacium =

Coordinates: 38°56′55″N 22°30′23″E

Narthacium or Narthakion (Ancient Greek: Ναρθάκιον) was a city of Phthiotis in ancient Thessaly, in the neighbourhood of which Agesilaus, on his return from Asia in 394 BCE, gained a victory over the Thessalian cavalry. The Thessalians, after their defeat, took refuge on Mount Narthacium, between which and a place named Pras, Agesilaus set up a trophy. On the following day he crossed the mountains of the Achaean Phthiotis. Narthacium is mentioned by Ptolemy.

An inscription referring to Narthacium has been preserved, documented as IG (9) 2.89, dated to the year 140 BCE regarding a senatus consultum on a territorial dispute between Narthacium and Melitaea.

The site of Narthacium is at a place called Limogardi (Λιμογάρδι), in the municipality of Lamia.
