= Phagros =

Phagros or Phagrus (Φάγρος) may refer to the:

- Phagrus, a son of Apollo and the nymph Othreis.
- Phagros, the Greek name of a seabream, and the genus name Pagrus is derived from it.
- Phagros, Athenaeus writes that it is a type of stone called phagros, because in Cretan the word for a whetstone is phagros, according to Simmias.
