= Anthotopos =

Anthotopos may refer to two settlements in Greece:

- Anthotopos, Kozani, a village in the Kozani regional unit
- Anthotopos, Magnesia, a village in the municipality of Almyros, Magnesia
