= Larissa Cremaste =

Ancient polis of Greece

- ἡ Κρεμαστὴ Λάρισα (Ancient Greek)
- Gardiki
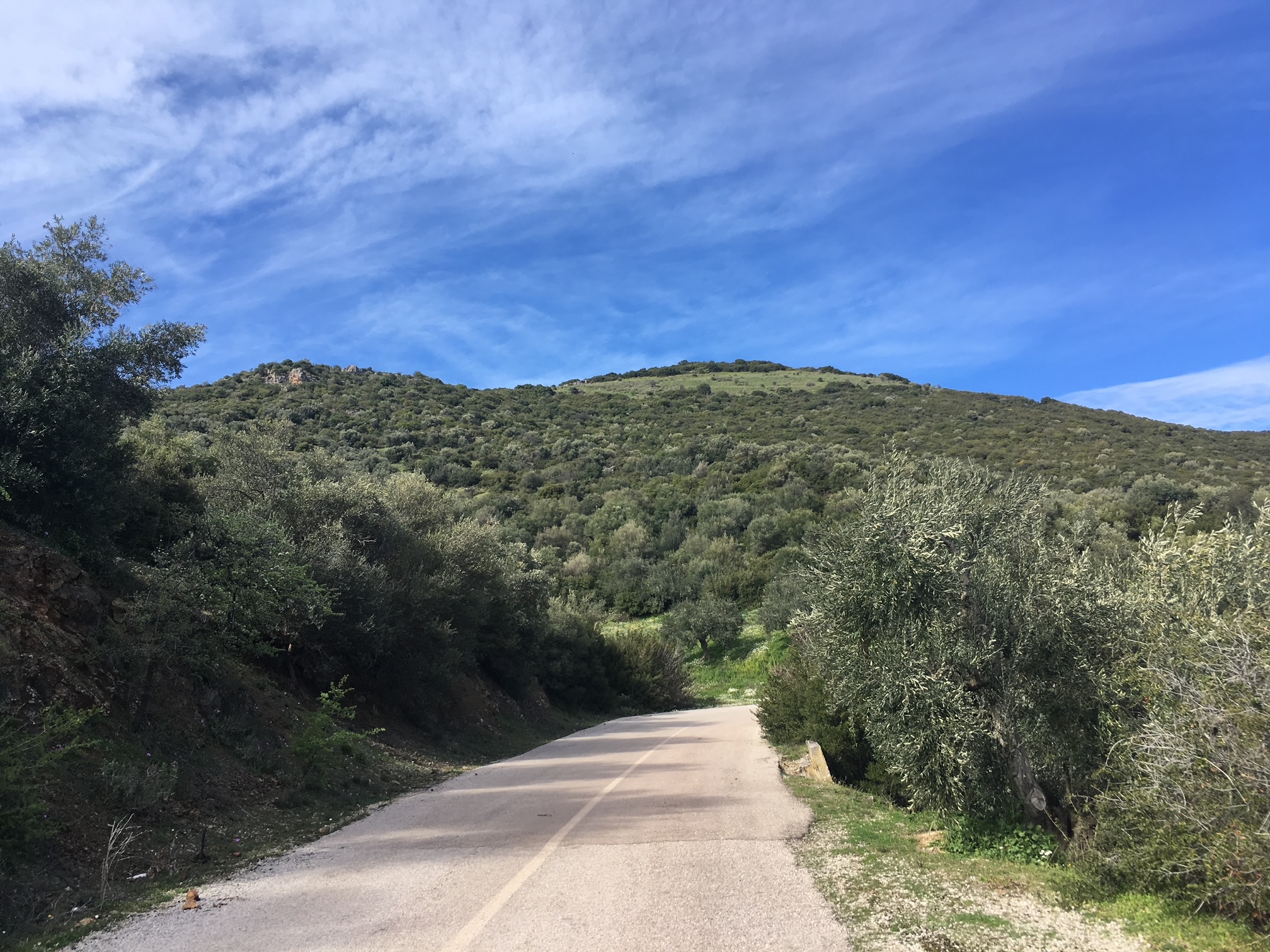
- The acropolis of Larissa Cremaste.

- Location within Greece
- 38°57′42″N 22°50′28″E
- Type: Ancient city
- Cultures: Ancient Greece
- Satellite of: Achaea Phthiotis
- Location: Pelasgia, Stylida
- Region: Phthiotis, Greece

History
- Built: Classical period
- Abandoned: Frankish period

Larissa Cremaste (Ancient Greek: ἡ Κρεμαστὴ Λάρισα) was a town of Ancient Pelasgia-East Phthiotida area of less importance than Larissa in Pelasgiotis, and was situated in the district of Achaea Phthiotis, at the distance of 20 stadia from the Maliac Gulf, upon a height advancing in front of Mount Othrys. It occupied the side of the hill, and was hence surnamed Cremaste, as "hanging" on the side of Mt. Othrys, to distinguish it from the more celebrated Larissa, situated in a plain. Strabo also describes it as well watered and producing vines. It is not to be mixed with the modern city of Larissa (Capital of Thessaly -Modern Greece). Larissa is actually a name meaning Fort, which justifies the fortification later discovered by archaeologists in that area. The same writer adds that it was surnamed Pelasgia as well as Cremaste.

== History ==
From its being situated in the dominions of Achilles, some writers suppose that the Roman poets give this hero the surname of Larissaeus, but this epithet is perhaps used generally for Thessalian. Larissa Cremaste was occupied by Demetrius Poliorcetes in 302 BCE, when he was at war with Cassander. It was taken by Lucius Apustius in the first war between the Romans and Philip V of Macedon, 200 BCE, and again fell into the hands of the Romans in the war with Perseus of Macedon in 171 BCE.

== Archaeological remains ==
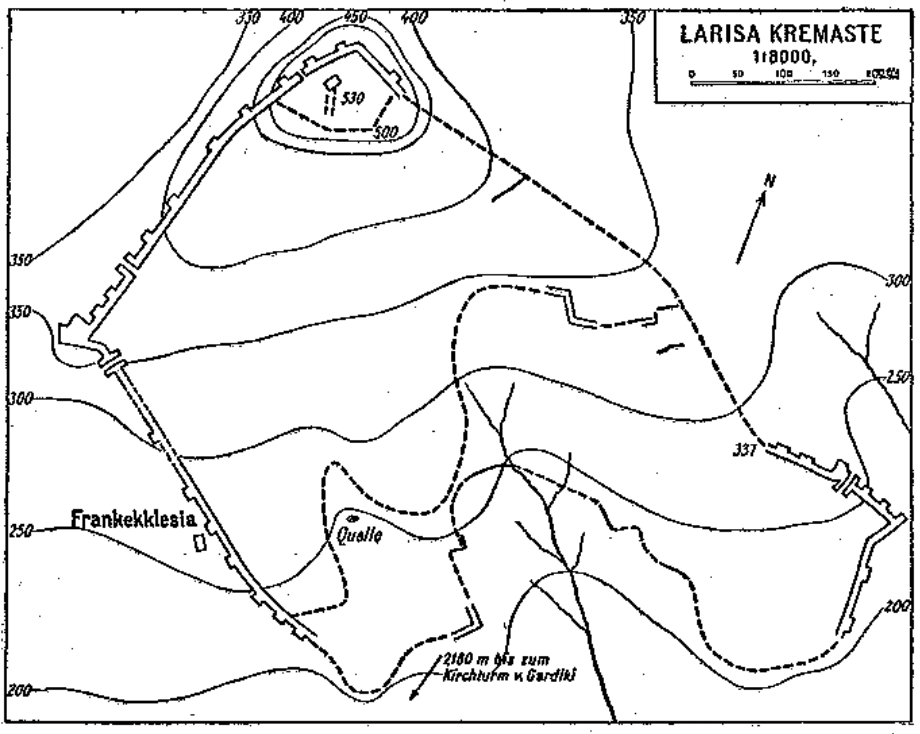
Plan of the visible ruins on site in 1912, by Friedrich Stählin.

The ruins of the ancient city are situated upon a steep hill, 2 kilometres (1.2 mi) from the modern town of Pelasgia, which was renamed to reflect the ancient surname. The walls are very conspicuous on the western side of the hill, where several courses of masonry remain. William Gell says that there are the fragments of a Doric temple upon the acropolis, but of these William Martin Leake makes no mention.

The only available plan of the ancient remains was made in 1912 by Friedrich Stählin, showing that a considerable city wall enclosed both the hilltop acropolis and a large section of the eastern slope of the hill. Stählin identified two larger gates in the lower fortifications and a postern in the outer wall of the acropolis. Much of the picture is reconstruction, such as the traces of a diateichisma dividing the settlement, with many segments of the wall apparently missing at the time of Stählin's visit. Stählin noted no remains predating the Classical period, with most of the standing ruins being Medieval (see below).

No archaeological excavation or examination has been conducted of the ancient city since Stählin's visit, but a small late-Classical necropolis was discovered in 2006 just northeast of the acropolis.

== Harbour settlement at Agios Konstantinos ==
During rescue excavations prompted by the construction of the A1 motorway in the early 2000s, considerable remains of an urban harbour settlement was found at the hill of Ayios Konstantinos, 4 km south of the ancient city, next the shore of the Maliac gulf.^a This settlement was probably the harbour of ancient Larissa, and situated in a protected bay of the Euboean Gulf, it must have been an important node in the local trade network. The remains have been dated to the Classical period, and appears to have been abandoned in the 4th century BC. It consists of a lower town at the beach protected by a fortification wall that extents to the adjacent hilltop where they enclose a small acropolis. A Late Hellenistic to Roman cemetery later occupied the site, which appears to have been completely abandoned at this point.

== Modern situation ==
The visible ruins of the Classical-Hellenistic period are partially covered by the masonry of the medieval settlement of Gardiki. The most well-preserved part of the medieval city is the hill-top keep which had been constructed on top of the previous acropolis, with a large cistern at its centre. The ruins of a church, the co-called Frangoekklisia (the "Frankish church") was visible immediately west of the ancient city wall by the early 20th century, but nothing of it remains today. Most of the visible remains on the site are now quite overgrown with shrubland, making it hard to discern most of the antiquities.

An early Christian basilica, Ayia Dynamis, with preserved mosaics was uncovered in 1981 about 5 km to the south close to the harbour settlement of ancient Larissa.

The site of ancient Larissa Cremaste is easily accessible for visitors, with signs directing from the national highway through the nearby village of Pelasgia. The hill-sides, however, are quite steep and covered in prickly shrubs, making the acropolis more difficult to reach.

== Notes ==
^aStill visible today immediately north of the road-side (38.92522262655854°N 22.852694134930132°E).
