= Xyniae =

Ancient city in ancient Thessaly, Greece

- Ξυνίαι (Ancient Greek) (Ancient Greek)
- Ezeros
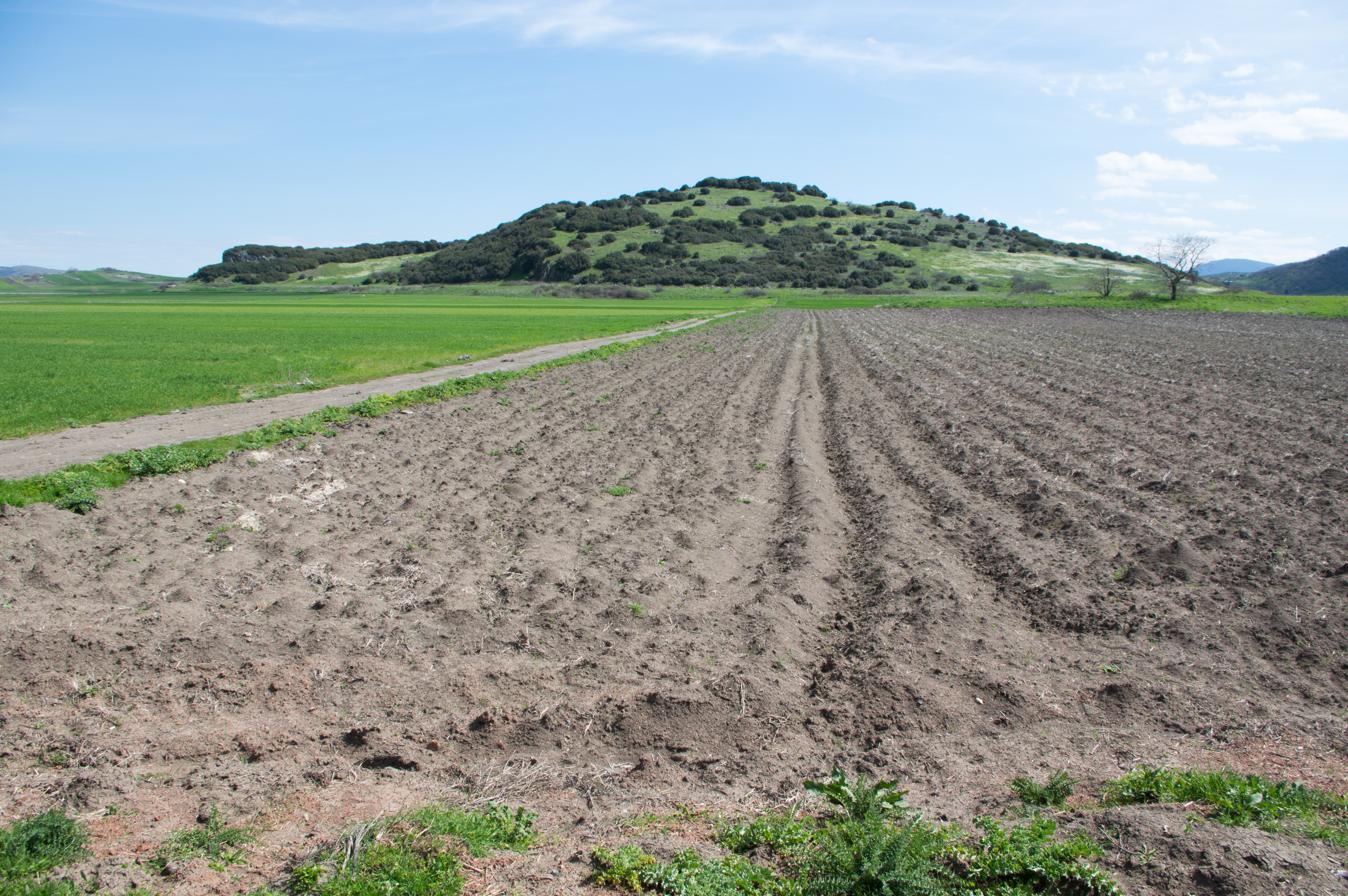
- The site of ancient Xyniae at Nisí.

- Location within Greece
- 39°02′18″N 22°16′09″E
- Type: Settlement, ancient polis.
- Periods: Hellenistic Greece – Byzantine Greece
- Cultures: Ancient Greek, Roman, Slavic, Byzantine
- Satellite of: Thessalian League, Aetolian League
- Location: Koromilia, Phthiotis, Central Greece, Greece
- Region: Achaea Phthiotis

Map showing ancient Thessaly. Xyniae is shown to the bottom center near the lake named after it.

Xyniae or Xyniai (Greek: Ξυνίαι) or Xynia (Greek: Ξυνία) was an ancient city in Achaea Phthiotis, Ancient Thessaly, in Greece. In the Middle Ages, it was known as Ezeros (Ἐζερός).

The city was located on the western slopes of Mount Othrys, some 4 km southwest of the modern village of Xyniada (in the Phthiotis Prefecture). The city was strategically located as it controlled the passages along the nearby Lake Xynias (the lake took its name from the city), from Lamia to Thaumaci (modern Domokos). During the second half of the 3rd century BC the city was Aetolian, but passed to Macedonia after that, only to be plundered and its population massacred by the Aetolians in 198 BC. In 186/5 BC it passed under Thessalian control, and then under Roman rule.

The city was still known under its ancient name in the 6th century AD, being mentioned by Stephanus Byzantius; but following the subsequent Slavic invasions and settlement it disappears, only to reappear in the 9th century as "Ezeros", after the Slavic word for "lake". The name survived until recently for the nearby village of Agios Stefanos. The medieval town is mostly known as a bishopric (attested since 879), being featured in the Notitiae Episcopatuum until well into Ottoman times. A castle was built amidst the ruins of the ancient acropolis; in part its outer walls follow the ancient foundations, but overall it encloses a much smaller space than the ancient fortifications.

In ca. 957 the leader of a local revolt, Theodosios, sought refuge in Ezeros. In the 1198 chrysobull of Alexios III Angelos to the Republic of Venice, it is mentioned as a chartoularaton. After the Fourth Crusade, the see came under Roman Catholic control (Nazorescensis) for a time, as a suffragan see of the Latin Archbishopric of Larissa; its first Catholic bishop was elected but never consecrated, and took part at the Second Parliament of Ravennika in 1210. By 1212 the see was vacant, and Pope Innocent III gave the bishopric to the bishop of nearby Zetounion (Lamia). The latter exploited it so mercilessly that the grant was withdrawn within a year. The town returned under Greek control soon after that, and in 1250, its bishop, a certain John Xeros, became Metropolitan of Nafpaktos.

As of the nineteenth century, William Smith remarked that the site of the ancient city was marked by some remains of ruined edifices upon a promontory or peninsula in Lake Xynias, a site now called Koromilia or Nisi.
