= Cuarius (Boeotia) =

River of ancient Boeotia

Cuarius (Ancient Greek: Κουάριος), also Latinised as Curalius, Cuerius, or Coralius, was a river of ancient Boeotia. Strabo suggests that the name was translated to Boeotia from the river of the same name in Thessaly by the Boeotians from their former home there.
