= Archival Wall of Aphrodisias =

Archaeological site in Turkey

The so-called "Archival Wall" is the north end wall of the stage building of the theatre in the city of Aphrodisias, located in Anatolia, Turkey, which was built in the late 1st century BCE. This wall has attracted scholarly attention because it contains several, well-preserved inscriptions, that were added after the initial construction of the wall. The fact that these inscriptions survived the test of time relatively well and are mostly still in situ is what makes this wall unique. The documents preserved on the wall originate from the second and third century CE and range from senatorial decrees to imperial letters. Additionally, all documents attest to a good relation between the city of Aphrodisias and its Roman rulers.

== Documents ==
The following documents are inscribed on the ‘Archival Wall’

- Senatorial decree from 39 BCE, the senatus consultum de Aphrodisiensibus, concerning the legally and fiscally privileged status granted by the Romans.
- Eleven Imperial letters, which were sent by Roman emperors.
  - Seven Imperial letters addressed to the city of Aphrodisias, including letters from emperors Hadrian, Gordian III, Commodus, Septimius Severus and Caracalla and, lastly, Severus Alexander.
  - Three Imperial letters addressed to the cities of Ephesus, Samos and Smyrna, sent by emperors Octavian and Trajan.
  - One Imperial letter by Octavian addressed to an individual named Stephanos.
- Triumviral decree from the reign of emperor Augustus.
- Documents on the sympolity of Plarasa and Aphrodisias.
  - List of excerpts recording early awards.
  - Letter by an individual named Stephanos to the sympolity.
- Letter to Plarasa/Aphrodisias (uncertain author and date).

== Significance ==
Despite the name it is commonly known as and the fact that it contains a varied collection of documents that were already historic at the time they were added to it, this wall is not an archive. An archive is meant for the deposition, retrieval and consultation of documents, either for a general public or for private individuals. The ‘Archival Wall’ of Aphrodisias does not fit these criteria.

The different documents were selected with care and presented to the public because they were meant to reflect a certain message. It is unclear who was in charge of this selection process, but it is most likely that the documents were selected and inscribed by members of Aphrodisias' elite, as they were the people who concerned themselves with the promotion of the city's identity. These documents were included because they represented Aphrodisias’ grandeur and history: the past initiatives by private citizens, the favour of the gods that was bestowed upon the city, Aphrodisias’ bravery and loyalty to Rome, and the appreciation and recognition of Rome for Aphrodisias in return.

The different documents incorporated in this wall are, therefore, historically significant as they improve archeological understanding of how ancient societies, such as the people of Aphrodisias, constructed and transmitted their public memory, how their commemoration practices worked and how they carefully constructed their own civic identity.
