= Koroneia =

Koroneia may refer to:

- two municipalities in Greece:
  - Koroneia, Thessaloniki
  - Koroneia, Boeotia
- Koroneia (Boeotia), an ancient town in Greece
- Koroneia (Thessaly), an ancient town in Greece
- Lake Koroneia, near Thessaloniki
