= Proerna =

Town and polis (city-state) of Phthiotis in ancient Thessaly

Coordinates: 39°14′37″N 22°16′23″E

Proerna (Ancient Greek: Πρόερνα) was a town and polis (city-state) of Phthiotis, in ancient Thessaly. Strabo lists the town between Thaumaci and Pharsalus, in Phthiotis, but otherwise provides no indication of its exact location. Stephanus of Byzantium writes Proarna (Προάρνα), and calls it by mistake a town of the Malians. In 191 BCE, Proerna, which had been taken by Antiochus III, was recovered by the consul Manius Acilius Glabrio during the latter's advance through Thessaly, a little while before the Battle of Thermopylae. We learn from this passage of Livy that Proerna stood between Pharsalus and Thaumaci.

The site of Proerna has been located at a place called Neo Monastiri (meaning, "new monastery") in the territory of Gynaikokastro.
