= Mount Narthacium =

Mountain famed in the mythology and history of ancient Thessaly

Map showing ancient Thessaly. Mount Narthacium - Narthacius Mons - is shown to the lower centre, south of Pharsalus.

Mount Narthacium (Latin: Narthacius Mons) was a mountain famed in the mythology and history of ancient Thessaly. Taking its name from the nearby ancient town of Narthacium, nearby was the scene of a battle where Agesilaus, on his return from Asia in 394 BCE, gained a victory over the Thessalian cavalry. The Thessalians, after their defeat, took refuge on Mount Narthacium, between which and a place named Pras, Agesilaus set up a trophy. On the following day he crossed the mountains of the Achaean Phthiotis. The ancient town of Pharsalus was built on its northern slopes. The legendary city of Phthia also stood on its flank.
