= Peuma =

Coordinates: 39°12′04″N 22°31′53″E

Peuma (Ancient Greek: Πεῦμα) or Peumata (Πεῦματα) was a polis (city-state) of Phthiotis in ancient Thessaly. It appears documented in an inscription at Delphi that records a border conflict among Peuma, Melitaea. Peuma is also cited as having a border dispute with Phyliadon also settled by neutral arbitration.

Peuma minted bronze coins that have been preserved which have been dated c. 302-286 BCE with the inscription «ΠΕΥΜΑΤΙΩΝ». Its site is identified with remains located at the hilltop east of the village Kallithea in the Municipality of Pharsala.
