= Antron =

Town and polis (city-state) of ancient Thessaly

- Ἀντρών (Ancient Greek)
- Fanos
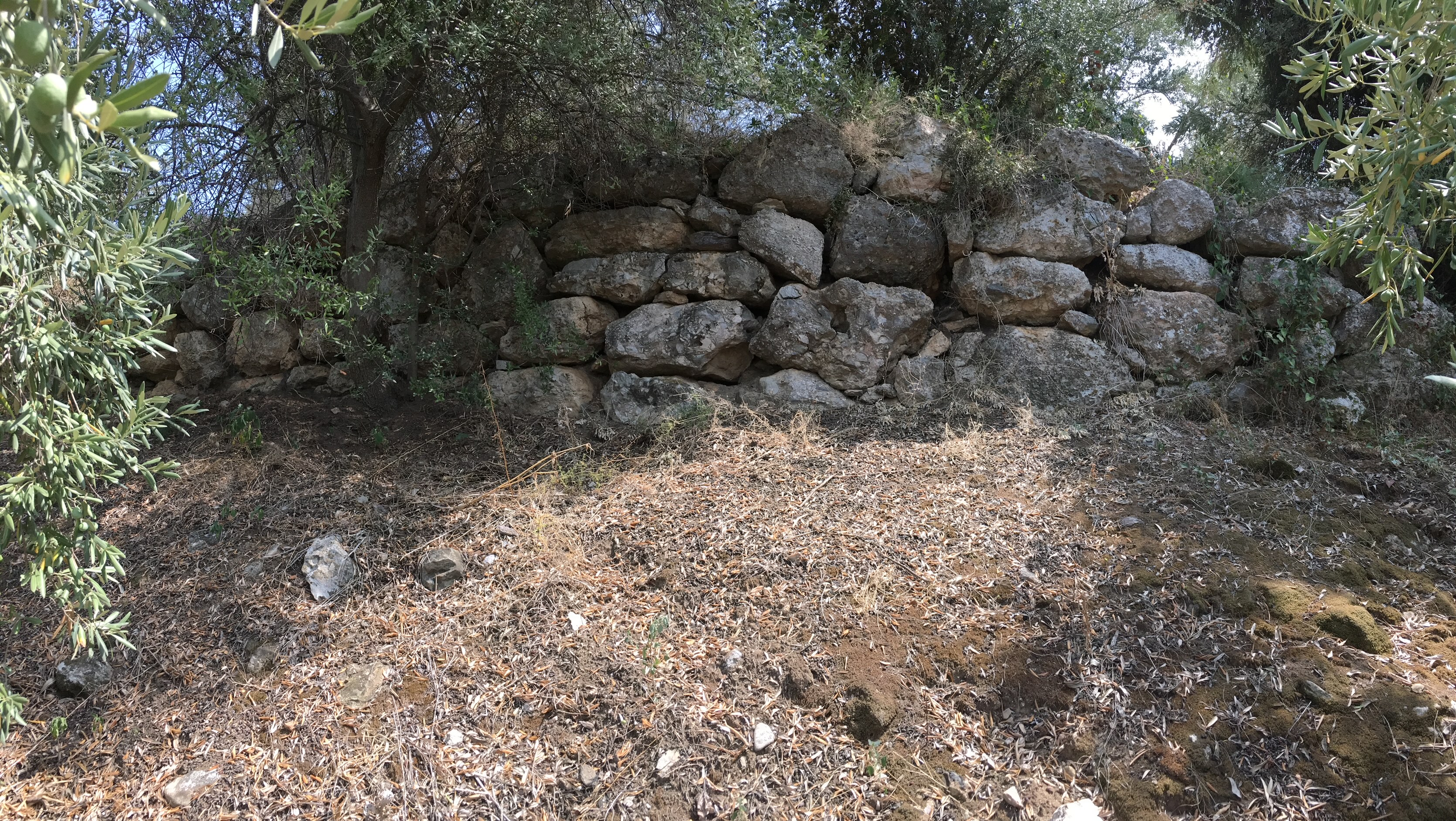
- The fortifications of Antron.

- Location within Greece
- 38°58′18″N 23°00′08″E
- Type: Ancient city
- Cultures: Ancient Greece
- Satellite of: Achaea Phthiotis
- Location: Fanos, Glyfa, Stylida
- Region: Phthiotis, Greece

History
- Built: Bronze Age
- Abandoned: Roman period

Antron (Ancient Greek: Ἀντρών) or Antrones (Ἀντρῶνες) was a town and polis (city-state) of ancient Thessaly in the district Achaea Phthiotis, at the entrance of the Maliac Gulf, and opposite Oreus in Euboea. It is mentioned in the Catalogue of Ships in the Iliad as one of the cities of Protesilaus, and also in the Homeric hymn to Demeter as under the protection of that goddess. It was purchased by Philip II of Macedon, and was taken by the Romans in their war with Perseus of Macedon. It probably owed its long existence to the composition of its rocks, which furnished some of the best millstones in Greece; hence the epithet of πετρήεις ("maritime") given to it in the hymn to Demeter. Off Antron was a sunken rock (ἕρμα ὔφαλον) called the Ὄνος Ἀντρῶνος, or mill-stone of Antron.

Modern scholars identify the location of Antron with the modern village of Glyfa.
