= Phyliadon =

Coordinates: 39°07′34″N 22°29′55″E

Phyliadon (Ancient Greek: Φυλιαδών) was a fortress and town of Phthiotis in ancient Thessaly. A border dispute with Peuma was settled by neutral arbitration.

Its site is located near the modern Morges (or Mories).
