= Demetrium =

Coordinates: 39°17′19″N 22°53′47″E

Demetrium or Demetrion (Ancient Greek: Δημήτριον), was a town of Phthiotis in ancient Thessaly, whose name derived from a temple of Demeter near Pyrasus spoken of by Homer in the Iliad, and which Strabo describes as the successor settlement to, and two stadia distant from Pyrasus. Besides Strabo, Demetrium is mentioned by numerous ancient authors: in the Periplus of Pseudo-Scylax, by Livy, Pomponius Mela, and Stephanus of Byzantium.

The site of Demetrium is tentatively located within Kantiraga (Marathos).
