= Stählin =

Stählin may refer to

- Friedrich Stählin (1874-1936), German philologist
- Wilhelm Stählin (1883-1975), German theologian
