= Xyniada =

Xyniada Ξυνιάδα
- Municipal unit
- Location within the regional unit

- Location within Greece
- Coordinates: 39°02′35″N 22°18′48″E
- Country: Greece
- Administrative region: Central Greece
- Regional unit: Phthiotis
- Municipality: Domokos

Area
  - Municipal unit: 206.8 km^{2} (79.8 sq mi)

Population (2021)
  - Municipal unit: 2,264
  - Municipal unit density: 10.95/km^{2} (28.35/sq mi)
  - Community: 301
- Time zone: UTC+2 (EET)
  - Summer (DST): UTC+3 (EEST)
- Vehicle registration: ΜΙ

Xyniada (Greek: Ξυνιάδα) or Xynias (Ξυνιάς) is a village and a former municipality in Phthiotis, Greece. Since the 2011 local government reform it is part of the municipality Domokos, of which it is a municipal unit. In the 2021 census, the municipal unit was recorded as having 2,264 inhabitants, and the village of Xyniada itself 301. The municipal unit has an area of 206.820 km^{2}. The village takes its name from Lake Xyniada, which covered the local plain until it was drained in 1936–42. The ruins of the ancient city of Xyniae (medieval Ezeros) are nearby.
