= Archaeological Museum of Lamia =

Museum in Lamia, Greece

- Αρχαιολογικό Μουσείο Λαμίας
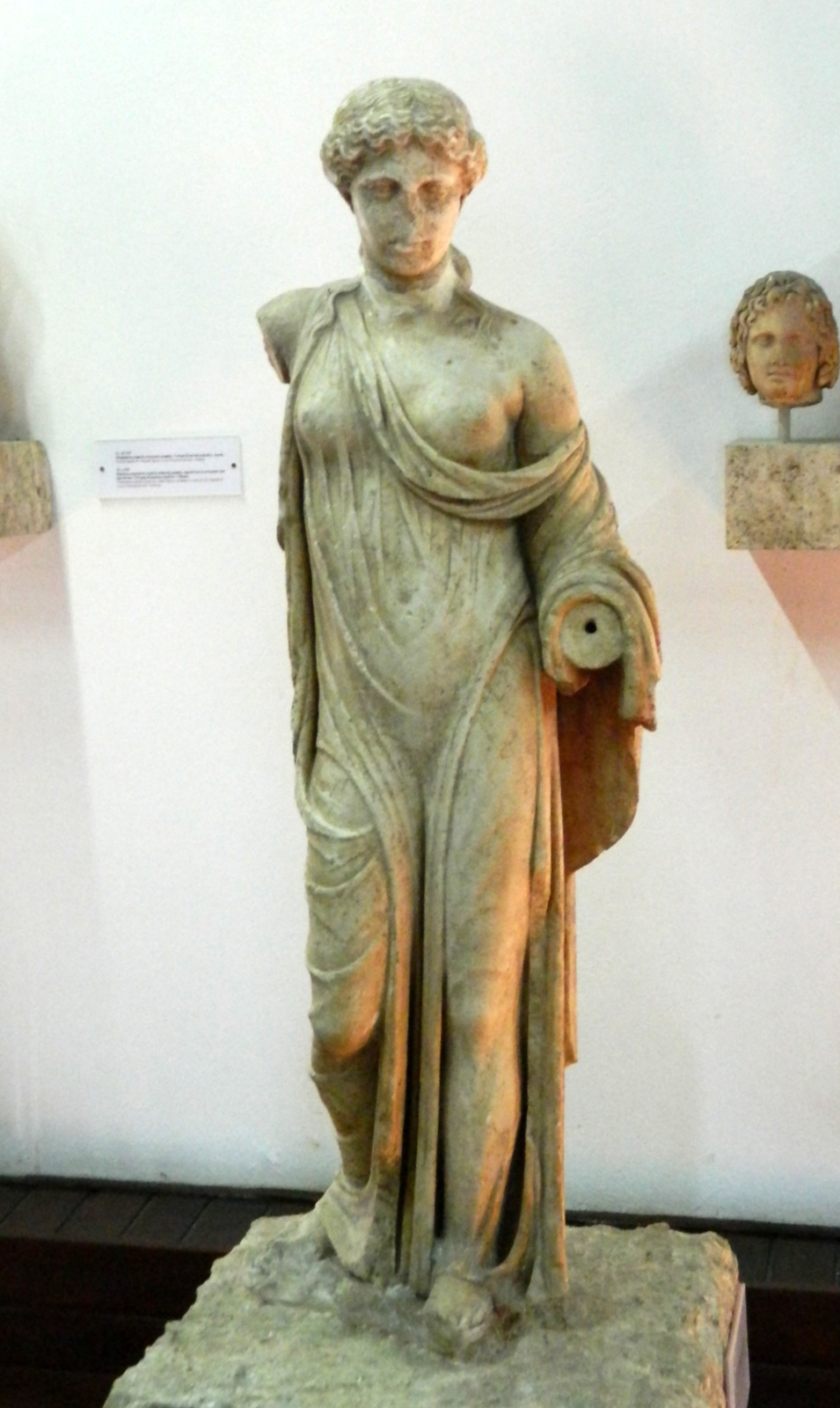
- Statuette of Aphrodite in the Archaeological Museum of Lamia
- Established: 1994
- Location: Lamia Castle, Lamia, Greece
- Coordinates: 38.904°N 22.433°E
- Type: Prehistoric and Classical Antiquities

The Archaeological Museum of Lamia (Greek: Αρχαιολογικό Μουσείο Λαμίας) is a museum within the archaeological site of Lamia Castle in Lamia, Greece. The museum is housed in a refurbished barracks built in 1830 by King Otto of Greece. It presents prehistoric and Classical antiquities, covering the Neolithic era, Helladic period, Early Iron Age, Archaic, Classical and Hellenistic periods.

== Background ==
The archaeological museum is located within the grounds of Lamia Castle on the acropolis of Lamia, the capital of the Fthiotida Prefecture. The castle was originally built in 1830 by Otto, the Bavarian first king of Greece after Greece attained independence. During World War II it was an army barracks. The Greek Ministry of Culture took possession of the barracks in 1973 from the Ministry for Defence, and the Archaeological Museum of Lamia opened to the public in September 1994.

== Exhibits ==
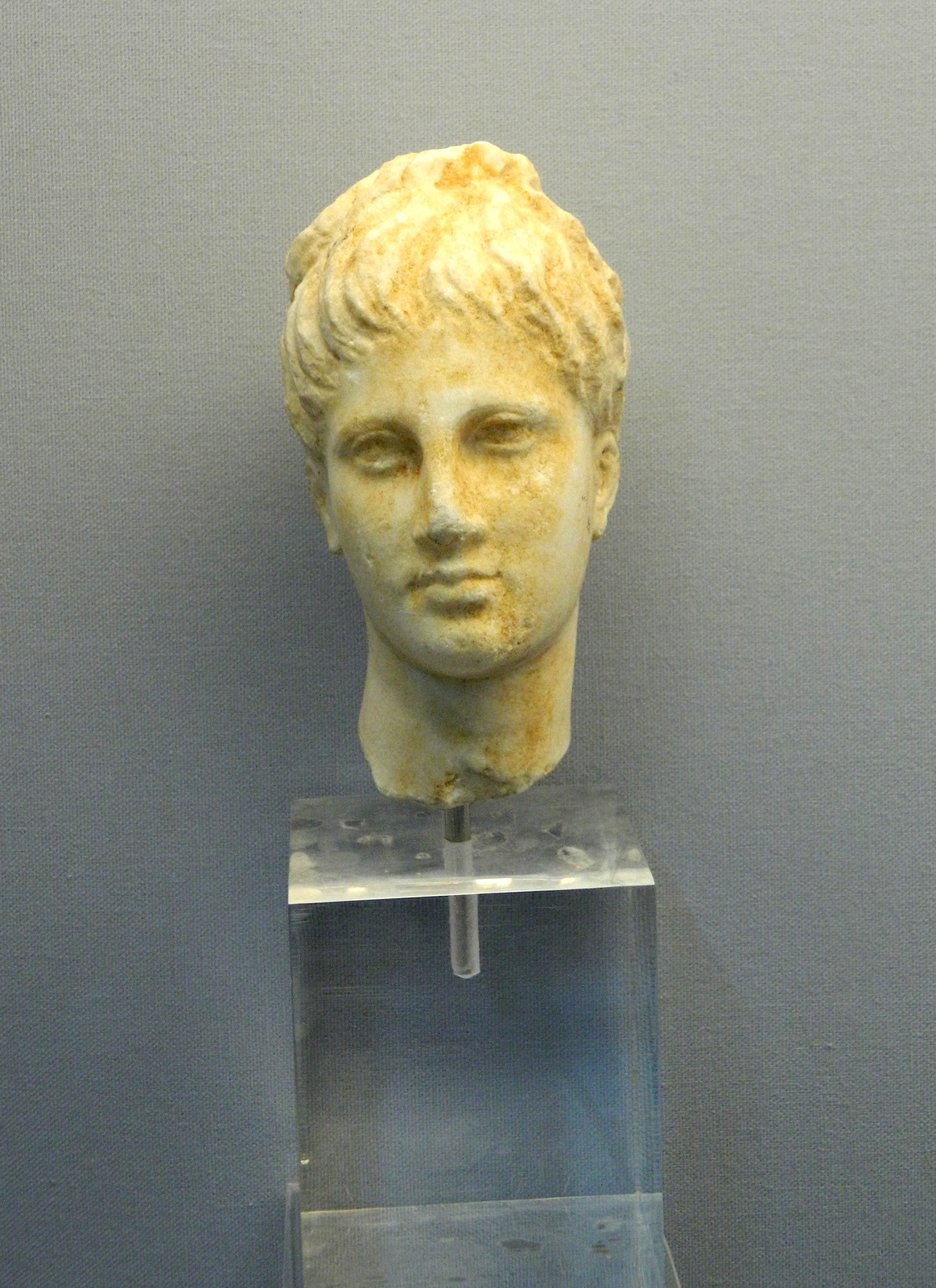
Marble head of Artemis Aspalis.

The museum occupies the ground floor and part of the first floor of the two-storied barracks building. The north hall is principally occupied by prehistoric, Bronze Age and Mycaenean artifacts, while the south hall focuses on the Late Archaic, Classical, Hellenistic and Roman periods.

Displays on the ground floor include a full-size marble sculpture of a Roman philosopher said to originate from Achinos, a collection of funerary stone slabs similar to those seen in Phthiotis, and an inscription from slave owners releasing their slaves from slavery from Achinos. In the first floor landing, small artifacts of busts, torso and votive reliefs are seen. The most prominent statue on display is the marble votive relief of Artemis Eileithyia of 400 BC, in the style of Praxiteles. On the first floor, there are 27 rooms, arranged around twelve themes, with objects displayed in cases or panels. These displays include antiquities unearthed from the archaeological excavations in Phthiotis and Evrytania. The findings are from areas such as Phokis, East Locris, Dorida, FAchaea Phthiotis and Malis.

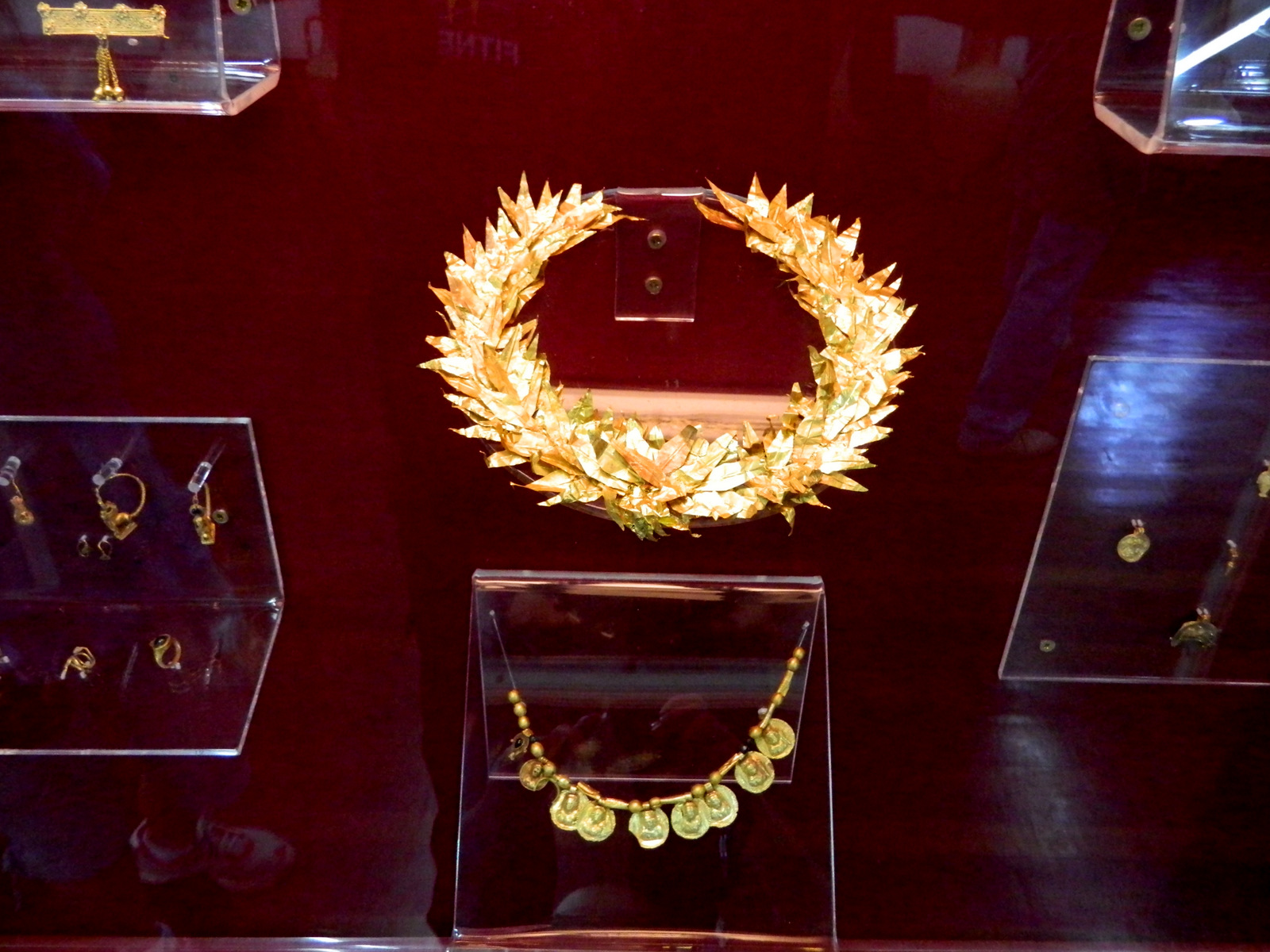
Gold ornaments of the Hellenistic period

Excavation finds of the Neolithic era include pottery, implements, Greek terracotta figurines, decorative ornaments, and spherical objects. Apart from pottery ware, ornaments, figurines, implements, soft stone seal-amulets, diagrammatic representation of a man and woman with associate armaments, and period attires, gold ornaments, and a warship-shaped artifact excavated from Kynos are from the Bronze Age. The artifacts of the Archaic period include elements of the Oracle of Apollo temple at Kalapodi which also comprises shelter and pilasters of the column, the shrine altar with religious paraphernalia, an Illyrian helmet made of bronze from Evrytania, superstructure structure components of an ancient portico with religious items, a figurine of Artemis from Melitaia, and a marble torso of Demeter.

The Classical, Hellenistic and Roman antiquities include ceramic and glass utensils as well as masks depicting Dionysos and Persephone, children's toys; recreated funerary structures with grave stones, a picture of the Three Graces on a mosaic floor, old gold ornaments and pottery ware, architectural finds of basic utilities, different types of money exchange prior to issue of coins, and a bust of Athena holding a balance. A prominent relief of 68 by 123 centimetres (27 in × 48 in) size depicts Artemis Locheia (Hellenistic goddess of safe child birth) from Achinos, showing a baby girl being offered by the mother (seen with a veil) to the mother goddess. It has been dated to the period of late 400 BC to 300 BC. Another artifact is a broken pin rest or a catch plate recovered from the Kainourgion excavations, which has the decoration of four fishes enclosed with in double out lines. Also on display is a 5th-century BC amphora, decorated in red, with floral designs on its neck which was excavated from Panagitsa at Elateia.

== Bibliography ==
- Bobou, Olympia (2015). Children in the Hellenistic World: Statues and Representation. Oxford University Press. ISBN 978-0-19-968305-5.
- Miller, Korina (2010). Greece. Lonely Planet. p. 254. ISBN 978-1-74220-342-3.
- Miller, Korina; Armstrong, Kate; Averbuck, Alexis; Clark, Michael S.; Deliso, Chris; Kyriakopoulos, Victoria; Schulte-Peevers, Andrea; Waters, Richard (1 February 2014). Lonely Planet Greece. Lonely Planet Publications. ISBN 978-1-74321-837-2.
- True, Marion; Hamma, Kenneth (1 December 1994). A Passion for Antiquities: Ancient Art from the Collection of Barbara and Lawrence Fleischman. Getty Publications. ISBN 978-0-89236-223-3.
