= Deinomenes (sculptor) =

Ancient Greek sculptor

Deinomenes was a sculptor listed by Pliny the Elder as one of the most celebrated brass sculptors and dates him as flourishing in the 95th Olympiad, B. C. 400. Pliny credits him with the creation of two sculptures: the first is of Protesilaus – a figure from the Iliad believed to be the first Greek to die at Troy. The second was of a wrestler named Pythodemus. He was also responsible for two statues located in the Acropolis in the lifetime of Pausanias. The statues are of Io and Callisto.

Tatian mentions him disparagingly in his Oratio ad Graecos, attributing to him a statue of Besantis, queen of the Paeonians, whom Tatian treats as a historical figure, but who was probably mythical. His name also appears on the base of another statue from the Acropolis, crediting him as the sculptor, but the statue itself is lost.

== Bibliography ==
- Böckh, Augustus (1828). Corpus inscriptionum graecarum : auctoritate et impensis Academiae Litterarum Regiae Borussicae. Berolini ex Officina Academica.
- Čausidis, Nikos (2012). "The River in the Mythical and Religious Traditions of the Paeonians" (PDF). Folia Archaeologica Balkanica. 2: 263–282.
- Chandler, Richard (1774). Inscriptiones antiquae, pleraeque nondum editae, in Asia Minori et Graecia, praesertim Athenis collectae: cum appendice. Oxonii : E Typographeo clarendoniano.
- Pausanias. Jones, W.H.S (ed.). Description of Greece.
- Pliny the Elder. Natural History.
- Smith, William (1801). Dictionary of Greek and Roman Biography and Mythology, Volume 1.
- Whittaker, Molly (1982). Tatian: Oratio ad Graecos and Fragments. Oxford University Press.
