= Aspalis =

Greek mythological woman

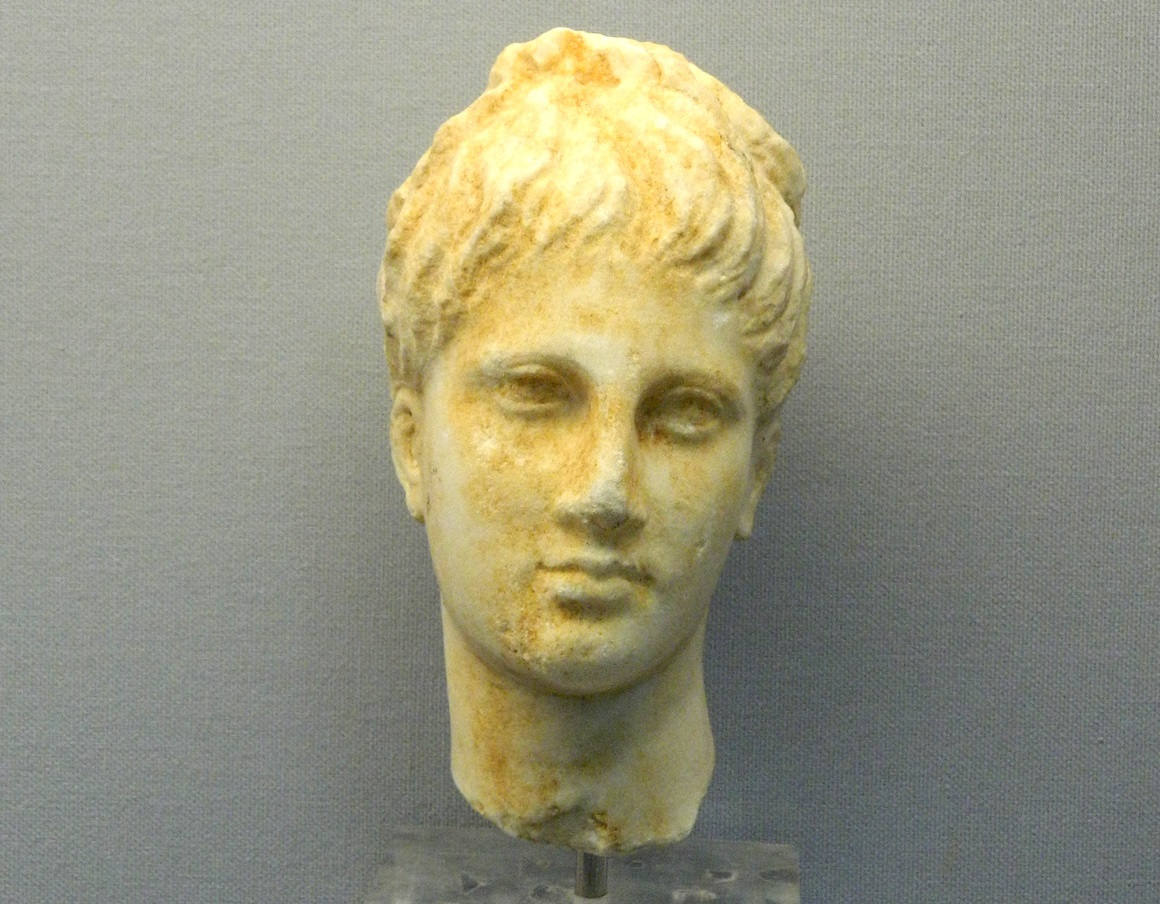
Head of statue of Artemis Aspalis from the sanctuary of Artemis Melitaea, Archaeological Museum of Lamia, Greece.

In Greek mythology, Aspalis (Ancient Greek: Ἁσπαλίς, romanized: Aspalís) was a local heroine from Melite in Phthia whose story was apparently meant to provide an etiology for the local surname and cult of Artemis. As in certain Artemis mythology, she hanged herself and her body disappeared.

== Mythology ==
The exact story of Aspalis, known from Antoninus Liberalis, is as follows. Melite was once ruled by a tyrant so cruel that the citizens dared not pronounce his real name, dubbing him Tartarus. He would order for the most beautiful girls to be brought to him and made them his concubines against their will. When he sent for Aspalis, daughter of Argaeus, the girl hanged herself rather than be violated. Her brother Astygites swore to avenge her death before her body would be taken out of the noose.

He put on his sister's clothes, hiding a sword underneath, and in this disguise got into the tyrant's palace and killed him. The citizens threw the tyrant's body into a river which from that circumstance became known as Tartarus, and crowned Astygites with a wreath to express gratitude to him. As they were going to give burial to Aspalis, they found that her body had disappeared, but a wooden statue of Artemis was discovered on the spot (It is believed that Artemis turned her body into statue out of pity). It became a cult object, and was referred to as "Aspalis Ameilete Hekaerge"; а young she-goat was sacrificed to the goddess every year via being hanged by the city maidens, this being a ritual imitation of Aspalis' suicide.

== Symbolism ==
Aspalis has been speculated to have originally been a western Semitic hunting goddess identified with Artemis.

== See also ==
- Britomartis
- Side
- Titanis
