= Efxeinoupoli =

Efxeinoupoli Ευξεινούπολη
- Community
- Location within Greece
- Coordinates: 39°11′0″N 22°44′14″E
- Country: Greece
- Administrative region: Thessaly
- Regional unit: Magnesia
- Municipality: Almyros
- Municipal unit: Almyros
- Village established: 1906

Population (2021)
  - Community: 2,078
- Time zone: UTC+2 (EET)
  - Summer (DST): UTC+3 (EEST)

Efxeinoupoli (Greek: Ευξεινούπολη) is a small town in the Municipality of Almyros, Magnesia regional unit, Thessaly, Greece. Efxeinoupoli counts 2,078 residents (2021).

== History ==
Efxeinoupoli was created in 1906. The first residents that came in the area were Greeks, refugees from Eastern Rumelia (de facto a part of Bulgaria). Firstly they were established in Almyros. The building of the town started on 29 September 1907. After the Greco-Turkish war (1919-1922) Greek refugees from Asia Minor came to the town of Efxeinoupoli.

The name of the town had been chosen to denote the origin of all those refugees from regions across the Euxeinos Pontos (Black Sea).

== Sports ==
The town is the home of the Athletic Club A.E Dimitra Efxeinoupolis, who is participating in B’ EPSTH.
