= Meliteus (son of Zeus) =

Son of Zeus in Greek mythology

In Greek mythology, Meliteus (Ancient Greek: Μελιτεύς, romanized: Meliteús, lit. 'honey-man') was the son of Zeus and the nymph Othreis. He was celebrated as the founder of the city of Melitaea in Thessaly.

== Mythology ==
Fearing that Hera would discover the affair, his mother abandoned him in a forest. Zeus, however, ensured that bees cared for and nourished the infant, allowing him to survive and grow. He was eventually discovered by his maternal half-brother Phagrus, a son of Apollo and Othreis, who found him while pasturing his sheep. Marvelling at the child's miraculous nourishment by the bees, took him home and raised him with care. Phagrus gave him the name Meliteus because he had been nourished by bees. Phagrus also recalled an oracle that he was destined to save a kinsman reared by bees.

Upon reaching adulthood, Meliteus was said to have become a noble and capable leader who ruled over many people in the region. He was later believed to have founded the town of Melitaea in Phthia, which was named after him.
