= A.E Dimitra Efxeinoupolis =

Greek football club

- Club logo
- Full name: A.E Dimitra Efxeinoupolis
- Nickname: Prasinoi (the greens)
- Founded: 1959
- Ground: Efxeinoupoli
- Capacity: 1500 (150 seats)
- Owner: A.E Dimitra Efxeinoupolis
- President: Georgios Liakos
- Manager: Sakis Kouklis
- League: Thessaly FCA Second Division
- 2025–26: Thessaly FCA Third Division, 1st (promoted)
- Website: http://www.aedimitra.gr/
Home colours	Away colours

Dimitra Efxeinoupolis is an amateur football and basketball club, located in Efxeinoupoli and was found in 1959. It was formed from the merger of the football clubs Keraunos and Astrapis. The first president of the club was Stavros Laggouras who gave the name to the club. One of the most important presidents of the club was Konstadinos Michalakopoulos. The name Dimitra was given because the majority of the citizens are farmers and in ancient Greek Mythology the Goddess Demeter is the goddess of the harvest, who presided over grains and the fertility of the earth, while at the same time it was the name of his youngest daughter Demeter. After two years in B'epsth DIMITRA is now again in the first amateur division. DIMITRA took the promotion with the amazing record of 21-1 W/L. The football club is participating in A'1 Epsth, while the basketball team on A2' Eskath. The stadium of the football club is Dimitra Efxeinoupolis and it has a capacity of 1500 attendant (150 seats) while the basketball team use the Public Closed Basketball Court of Almyros, with a capacity of 350 seats.

== Current squad ==
As of 23 July 2017

=== Football roster ===
Note: Flags indicate national team as defined under FIFA eligibility rules; some limited exceptions apply. Players may hold more than one non-FIFA nationality.

No.	Pos.	Nation	Player
—	GK	GRE	Savvas Savvidis
—	GK	GRE	Giorgos Sarris
—	DF	GRE	Thanassis Antoniadis
—	DF	GRE	Dimitris Stefanis
—	DF	GRE	Valentinos Karateev
—	DF	GRE	Giorgos Avgoulas
—	DF	GRE	Dimitris Gkarnidis
—	DF	GRE	Ilias Arapis
—	DF	GRE	Tasos Tsergas
—	DF	GRE	Sergio Baraku

No.	Pos.	Nation	Player
—	MF	GRE	Nikos Voulgaris
—	MF	GRE	Aggelos Daras
—	MF	GRE	Thanasis Koutsoumpas
—	MF	GRE	Thanasis Siamourdanis
—	MF	GRE	Stelios Timplalexis
—	MF	GRE	Efthimis Xerokostas
—	FW	GRE	Avgoustinos Kaklias
—	FW	GRE	Dimitris Galatsidas
—	FW	GRE	Nikos Voulgaris
—	FW	GRE	Alekos Arapitsas

A.E Dimitra Efxeinoupolis Basketball Club
- Leagues: A2' ESKATH
- Founded: 1959
- Arena: Closed Court Of Mincipality of Almyros450 (fan seating); 350
- Location: Efxeinoupoli, Greece
- Team colors: Green and White
- President: Antonis Milionis
- Head coach: Thanasis Spanos
- 2016-17 position: B' ESKATH, 4th
Home	Away

=== Basketball roster ===
Pos.	Starting 5	Bench 1	Bench 2	Bench 3
C	Vasilis Nakos	Xristos Dalakouras	Manolis Grigorakis
PF	Hlias Mpourlis	Ioakeim Chrysopoulos	Dionisis Papaoikonomou	Triantafyllos Makris
SF	Giorgos Karapsias	Odysseas Chatzis	Xristos Giagkos
SG	Giorgos Kourkoumpas	Vasilis Tempelis	Pantelis Karageorgopoulos	Xristos Mylonas
PG	Apostolis Kotoulas	Konstantinos Vlachoulis	Vasilis Deligiannis	Aggelos Maggas
