= Coroneia (Thessaly) =

Coroneia or Koroneia (Ancient Greek: Κορώνεια) was a town of ancient Thessaly in Phthiotis, from which the Boeotian Coroneia probably derived its name. It has not been located.

It has been proposed that, if it donated money for the reconstruction of the Temple of Apollo at Delphi at the end of the 4th century BCE, it existed already prior to that date and also at least in classical period, although there is no evidence that it coined currency until 308 BCE.

It was one of the cities seized by Philip V of Macedon, during the Roman-Seleucid War, and from where the Roman Senate forced him to withdraw his garrisons. It has been suggested that its location was next to the Thessaly border, in the vicinity of Iton.
