= Laodamia (Wordsworth) =

Poem by William Wordsworth

Laodamia (1815, 1845) is a narrative poem by William Wordsworth based on a story from the Trojan War.

== Description ==
Wordsworth's "Laodamia", published in 1815, is a narrative poem in stanzas dealing with the classical story of Protesilaus, a Greek hero who sacrificed himself in fulfilment of the oracle which declared that victory should be the lot of that party from which should fall the first victim in the Trojan War. According to the legend, as narrated by Wordsworth, Laodamia, the wife of Protesilaus, prays to the gods that her husband may return to her from Hades. He does so and relates the story of his death at the hands of Hector, rebuking the excessive passion of his wife, who cannot bring herself to consent to his return to the shades of death. Summoned by Hermes the spectre departs, leaving Laodamia a lifeless corpse upon the palace floor. The poem closes with a description of the trees which grew from the tomb of each and withered at the top when they had attained such a height that they commanded a view of the walls of Troy.

== Interpretation ==
The underlying idea of the poem is the weakness of the soul exemplified in Laodamia, whose uncontrolled love makes her incapable of lifting her heart to a "higher object" and accepting her husband's sacrifice and fate. Both the motive of the piece and its classical atmosphere reflect the change in point of view which Wordsworth experienced in his maturer years (See "Ode to Duty"). Its beauty of style and calm nobility of tone make it one of Wordsworth's unquestionable masterpieces. The poem bears traces of the influence of Virgil, whom the poet was rereading at the time.

== Versions ==
In an earlier version Laodamia is more pitied than condemned. Later the ethics of the poem seemed to require her punishment. The present ending, adopted in 1845, is a kind of compromise.
