= Senatus consultum Macedonianum =

Roman law

The senatus consultum Macedonianum was a decree of the Roman Senate issued during the time of Vespasian (reigned AD 69–79) pertaining to loans taken out by adult sons who were still subject to the legal control of their patriarch, ie in potestate. It aimed to prevent creditors from suing on most such loans, which had become subject to various kinds of fraud.

The need for such a decree arose from the legal tensions of patriarchy within the Roman family, which kept adult sons as minor dependents under the power of their father, the paterfamilias, until his death. The preamble of the decree cites the case of one Macedo, an upper-class son still in potestate, who was heavily in debt to moneylenders and murdered his father to hasten his inheritance. The decree, which may not have been very effectual, said that a creditor could not sue the estate, with the intention that such loans would not be made if they were unrecoverable.

== See also ==
- Roman law
- List of Roman laws
- Inheritance law in ancient Rome
