= Phagrus =

Son of Apollo in Greek mythology

In Greek mythology, Phagrus or Phagros (Ancient Greek: Φάγρος, lit. 'red porgy' or 'seabream') was the son of Apollo and the nymph Othreis.

== Mythology ==
While pasturing his sheep, Phagrus happened upon the child Meliteus, his step-brother, the son of Zeus and Othreis, who had been exposed in a wood by his mother out of fear of Hera. Phagrus marveled at how well fed the child was and noticed that bees were nourishing him. Phagrus gathered the child up and took him home. He reared him with great care and named him Meliteus, a name derived from the fact that the child had been nourished by bees. In doing so, Phagrus recalled an oracle in which the god had once told him that he would be the one to save someone of the same kin who had been reared by bees.

Through Phagrus's actions, Meliteus survived and was raised to adulthood. Meliteus grow into a man of nobility, later ruling over many people of the region and founding the city of Melitaea (Thessaly) in Phthia.
