= Phylace (Thessaly) =

- Φυλάκη (Ancient Greek)
- Kitiki
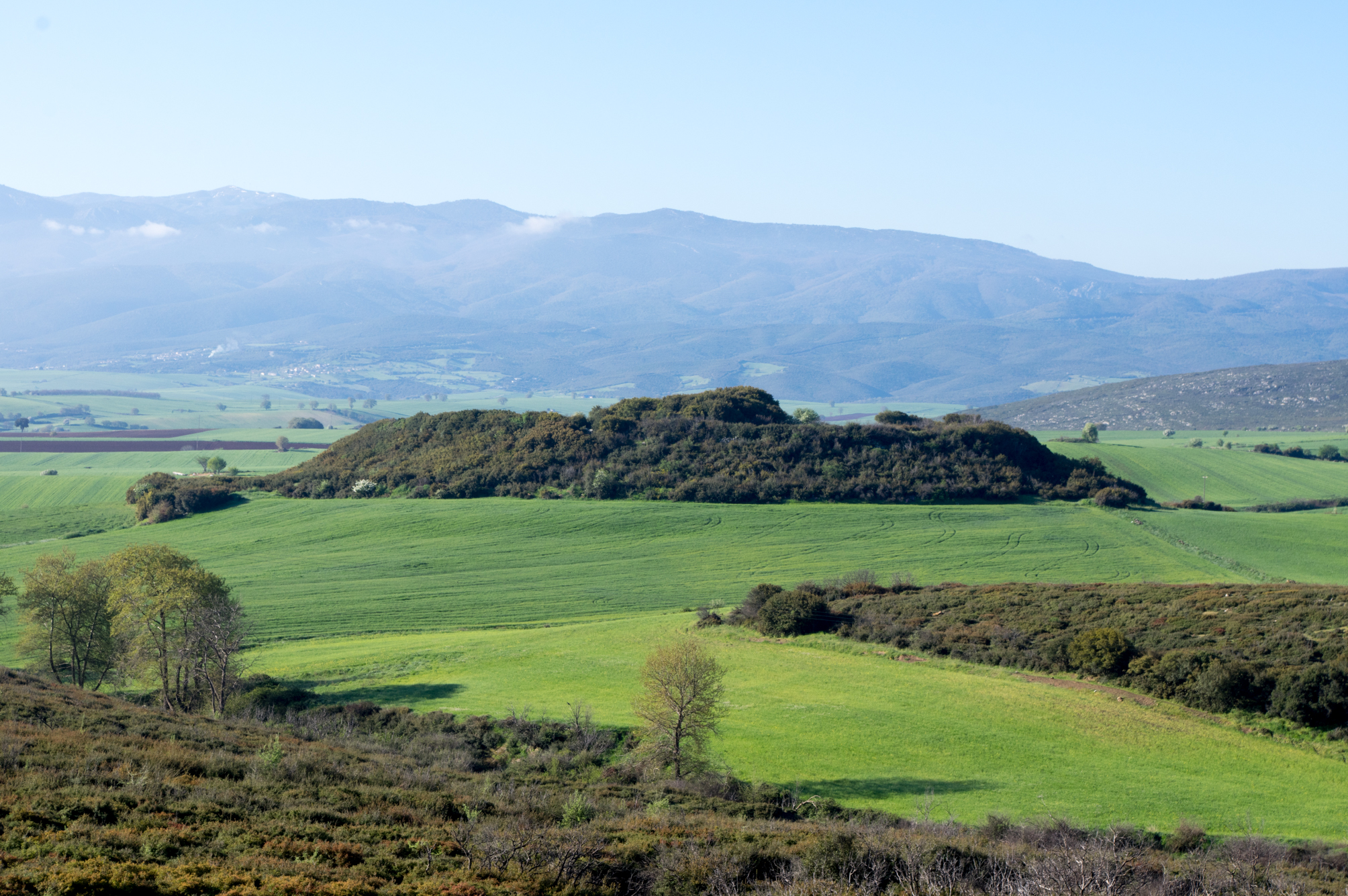
- The archaeological site of ancient Phylake.

- Location within Greece
- 39°14′28″N 22°36′04″E
- Type: Ancient city, hillfort
- Cultures: Ancient Greece
- Location: Filaki, Almyros
- Region: Magnesia, Thessaly, Greece
- Part of: Ancient Phthiotis

History
- Built: Neolithic period
- Abandoned: Hellenistic period

Phylace or Phylake (Ancient Greek: Φυλάκη, [ˌfyˈlaˌkɛː]), was a town and polis (city-state) of Phthiotis in ancient Thessaly. According to Greek mythology, this city was founded by Phylacus. In Ancient Greece, Phylace was a kingdom. Homer writes that this was one of the places subject to Protesilaus, who was the first Greek hero killed in the Trojan War, and the place is frequently mentioned in the Homeric poems. It contained a temple of Protesilaus. Pliny erroneously calls it a town of Magnesia. Strabo describes it as standing between Pharsalus and Phthiotic Thebes, at the distance of about 100 stadia from the latter.

The site of ancient Phylace has traditionally been identified with a low hill at Kitiki (renamed Filaki), in the municipal unit of Filaki. As no inscriptions have been found at this location confirming the identification, it must be regarded as tentative. Another candidate is the hill of Dervisi close to Aerino (formerly Persoufli).
