= Pras (Thessaly) =

Town of Phthiotis in ancient Thessaly

Pras (Ancient Greek: Πρᾶς) was a town of Phthiotis in ancient Thessaly, a little south of Pharsalus. Agesilaus, on his return from Asia in 394 BCE, gained a victory over the Thessalian cavalry nearby. The Thessalians, after their defeat, took refuge on Mount Narthacium, between which and Pras, Agesilaus set up a trophy. On the following day he crossed the mountains of the Achaean Phthiotis.

Its site is unlocated.
