= Amphanae =

- Ἀμφαναί (Ancient Greek)
- Amphanai
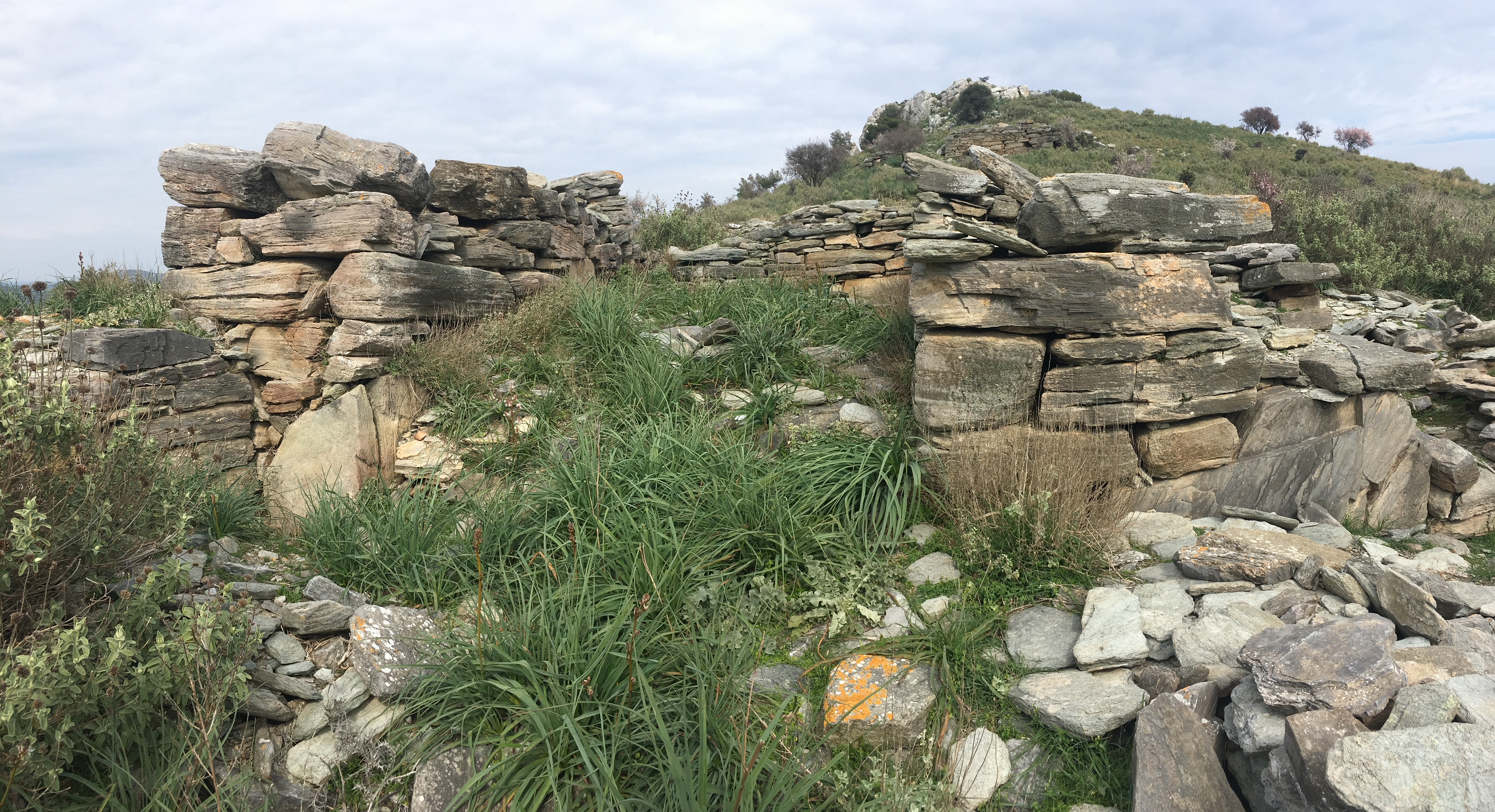
- The great gate at Soros.

- Location within Greece
- 39°18′47″N 22°55′49″E
- Type: Ancient city, hillfort
- Periods: Archaic period
- Cultures: Ancient Greece
- Location: Soros, Volos
- Region: Magnesia, Thessaly, Greece
- Part of: Pelasgiotis, Ancient Thessaly

Site notes
- Archaeologists: Alexandros Mazarakis Ainian
- Website: http://efamagvolos.culture.gr/Amfanai.html

Amphanae or Amphanai (Ancient Greek: Ἀμφαναί, Ἀμφαναία or Ἀμφαναῖον) was the southernmost city on the east coast of the district of Pelasgiotis, Ancient Thessaly, near the border between the Pelasgiotis and Achaea Phthiotis forming promontory Pyrrha. Its location is doubtful, and several locations have been proposed, including Soros in the municipality of Volos, Damari, Paleo Alikes in the municipality of Volos, and the palaiokastro (old fort) of Sesklou. The identification with Soros is accepted by the editors of the Realencyclopädie der classischen Altertumswissenschaft, and tentatively accepted by the editors of the Barrington Atlas of the Greek and Roman World. However, the most recent excavations seem to indicate that Soros is more likely to be identified with Pagasas.

Referencing Hecataeus of Miletus, Stephanus of Byzantium distinguishes a Doric Amphanai, this seems to be based on a mistake; probably this Thessalian city was founded by Dorians is meant, and therefore Hekataios thus labelled it as a "Doric city" rather than a "city in Doris".
