= Othreis =

Nymph in Greek mythology

In Greek mythology, Othreis (Ancient Greek: Ὀθρηΐς, romanized: Othrēís, lit. 'of Mount Othrys') was a nymph who consorted with both Zeus and Apollo and became by them mother of Meliteus and Phagrus respectively.

== Mythology ==
When Meliteus was born, Othreis, in fear of Hera's wrath, exposed the child. The boy, however, was nurtured by bees and thus survived. He was soon found by his half-brother Phager, who was pasturing his sheep in the neighborhood. Impressed with the child being nurtured in such a marvelous way, as well as having reckoned a prophecy that told him to take care of his relative nourished by bees, Phager adopted and raised Meliteus. When Meliteus grew up, he founded the city Melite in Phthia.
