= Anthotopos, Kozani =

Anthotopos Ανθότοπος
- Community
- Location within Greece
- Coordinates: 40°20′10″N 21°40′21″E
- Country: Greece
- Administrative region: Western Macedonia
- Regional unit: Kozani
- Municipality: Kozani
- Municipal unit: Kozani

Population (2021)
  - Community: 136
- Time zone: UTC+2 (EET)
  - Summer (DST): UTC+3 (EEST)
- Postal code: 50150
- Area code: +30-2461

Anthotopos (Greek: Ανθότοπος) is a village in the municipality of Kozani, Kozani regional unit, Greece. It is situated at an altitude of 758 meters above sea level. The population was 136 at the 2021 census.

== History ==
During the Ottoman Era the village was known as Kalburcular (Καλπουρτζιλάρ). However it was renamed to Koskinia (Κοσκινιά) in 1927. Later in 1961 it was renamed to Anthotopos.

According to the statistics of Bulgarian ethnographer Vasil Kanchov from 1900, 200 inhabitants lived in Kalburcular (Калбуджиларъ) all Muslim Turks.

The village had a mosque in the past during the Ottoman Era. After the Greco-Turkish Population Exchange, the mosque was used as a church until 1950, when it was demolished.
