= Archaeological Museum of Almyros =

Museum in Almyros, Greece

Coordinates: 39°10′46.7″N 22°45′53″E

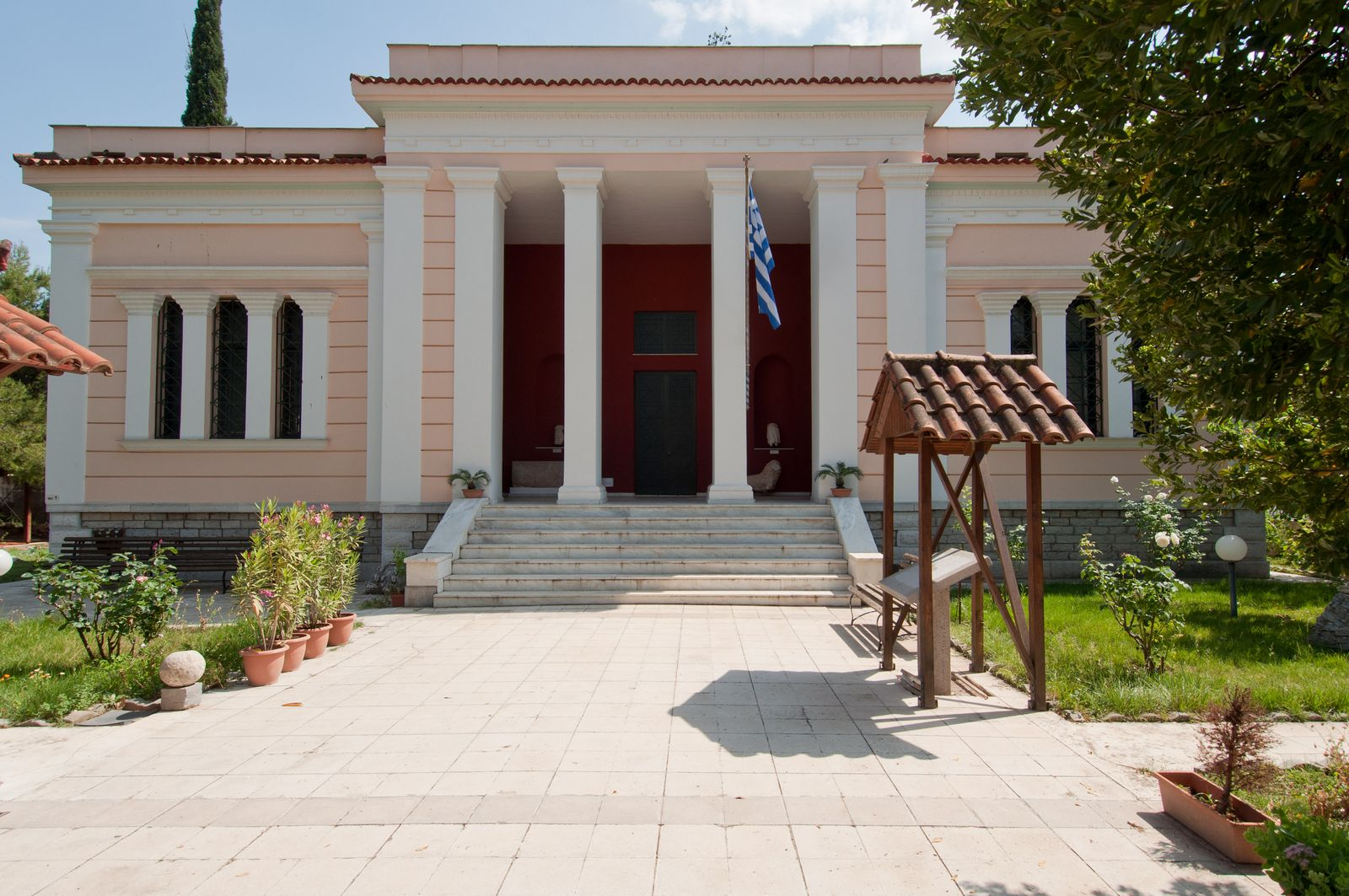
Archaeological Museum of Almyros (2013)

The Archaeological Museum of Almyros is a museum in Almyros, Greece. It was built by and belonged to, until the 1950s, by the Othrys, Filarchaeos Etaireia Almyrou, a non-profit local organization found in the beginning of 20th century. Now it belongs to the Hellenic Ministry of Culture.

The museum includes local artifacts and other exhibits from the Neolithic period, through Mycenean, Geometric, Classical, Hellenistic periods, and later Roman years. Opposite the museum is the old High School, the Gymnasium of Almyros, which is a classic monumental building from the beginning of 20th century. The Museum and Gymnasium are the oldest buildings in the area and had suffered great damage during the 1980 earthquake.
