= Iton (Thessaly) =

Coordinates: 39°09′53″N 22°42′40″E

Iton (Ancient Greek: Ἴτων) or Itonus or Itonos (Ἴτωνος) was a town of Phthiotis in ancient Thessaly, mentioned by Homer in the Catalogue of Ships in the Iliad and called by him "mother of flocks." The town was situated 60 stadia from Alus, upon the river Cuarius or Coralius, and above the Crocian plain.

In Greek mythology it was the city where, according to Pseudo-Apollodorus, the battle took place between Heracles and Cycnus.

Iton had a celebrated temple of Athena, whose worship, under the name of the Itonian Athena, was carried by the Boeotians, when they were expelled from Thessaly, into the country named after them.

Iton's location is tentatively placed at the hill named Magoula Zirilia (or Zerelia) within the community of Platanos (Πλάτανος) in the municipality of Almyros.
