= Cuarius =

River in Greece

Cuarius (Ancient Greek: Κουάριος), also Latinised as Curalius, Cuerius, or Coralius, was a river of ancient Thessaly in Greece. It is noted by Strabo as flowing past the ancient cities of Cierium and Iton. It has a Latitude of 39.469000 and Longitude of 22.116000.
