= Lake Xynias =

Former lake in Greece

- Λίμνη Ξυνιάς/Ξυνιάδα (Greek)
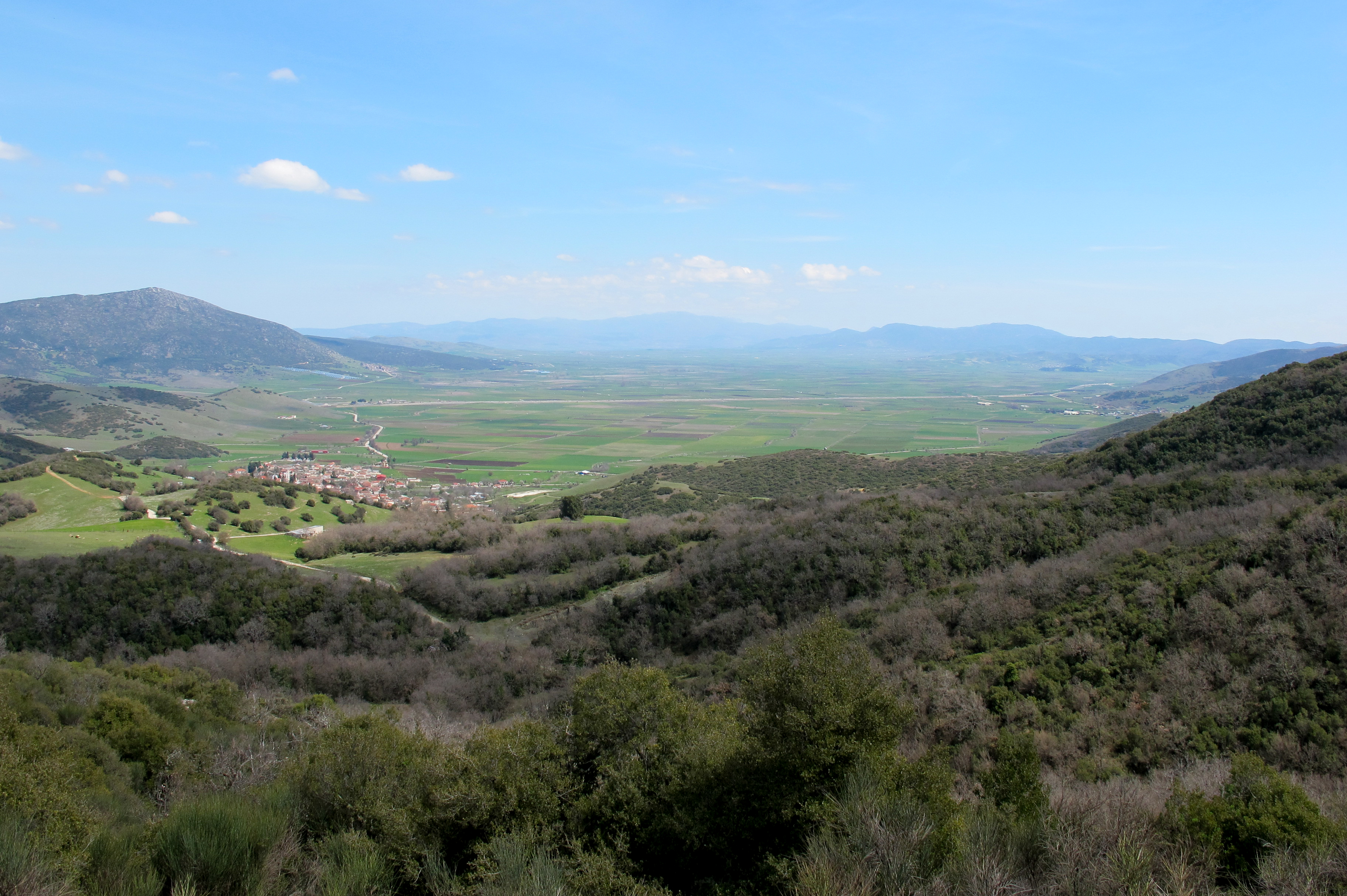
- The Domokos tableland and the former lake Xynias, drained in the 1940s. In the background, the Othrys range

- Location within Greece
- Interactive map of Lake Xynias
- Location: Xyniae, Phthiotis, Central Greece
- Coordinates: 39°03′58″N 22°16′26″E
- Type: Volcanic crater lake
- Etymology: Xyniae
- Basin countries: Greece

Lake Xynias or Xyniada (Greek: Λίμνη Ξυνιάς/Ξυνιάδα) was a lake in Central Greece.

The lake lay in a caldera of Mount Othrys, and measured approximately 5 km × 7 km, with a depth of 5 m. It was named after the nearby city of Xyniae. In the Middle Ages, it received the Slavic name Ezeros, after which the city was also renamed.

The lake was drained in 1936–42 to create arable farmland.
