= Protesilaus =

Greek mythological hero

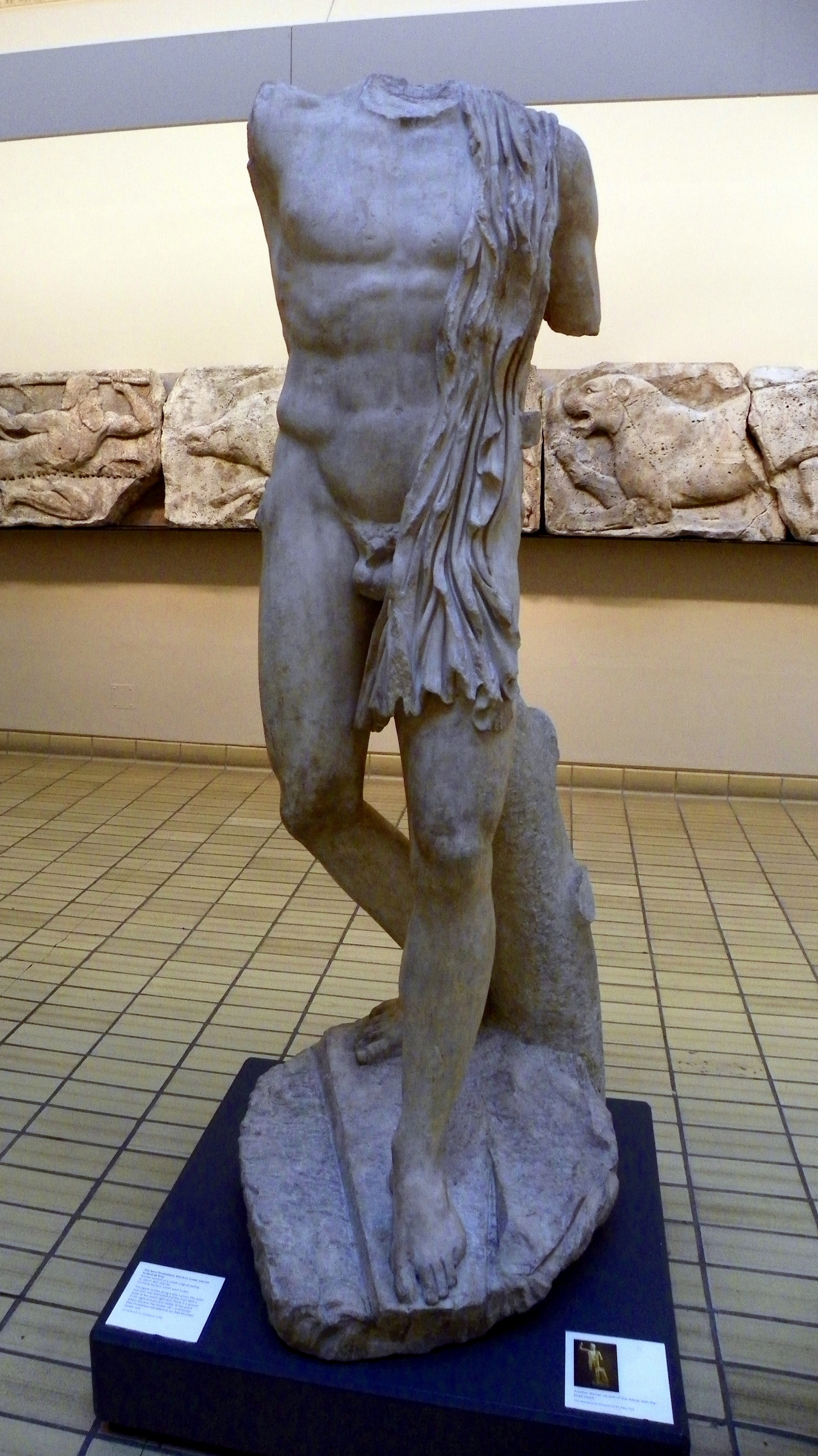
Roman statue of Protesilaus from Cyzicus, now in the British Museum.

In Greek mythology, Protesilaus (/ˌprɒtɪsɪˈleɪəs/; Ancient Greek: Πρωτεσίλᾱος, romanized: Prōtesilāos) was a hero in the Iliad who was venerated at cult sites in Thessaly and Thrace. Protesilaus was the son of Iphiclus, a "lord of many sheep"; as grandson of the eponymous Phylacos, he was the leader of the Phylaceans. Hyginus surmised that he was originally known as Iolaus—not to be confused with Iolaus, the nephew of Heracles—but was referred to as "Protesilaus" after being the first (πρῶτος, protos) to leap ashore at Troy, and thus the first to die in the war.

== Description ==
In the account of Dares the Phrygian, Protesilaus was illustrated as ". . .fair-skinned, and dignified. He was swift, self-confident, and even rash."

== Mythology ==
Protesilaus was one of the suitors of Helen. He brought forty black ships with him to Troy, drawing his men from "flowering" Pyrasus, coastal Antron and Pteleus, "deep in grass", in addition to his native Phylace.

According to Philostratus, Protesilaus participated in the Achaean attack on Teuthrania. When the inexperienced ships of the Arcadians ran aground on the shore, both Achilles and Protesilaus leapt forward to defend them to drive the Mysians off. He, Achilles, and Patroclus fought the main force of Mysians, who were led by King Telephus, a son of Heracles. Protesilaus disarmed Telephus of his shield, but Achilles wounded him in the thigh, causing him to flee. The two later contended for ownership of the shield, but it was eventually awarded to Protesilaus.

At Troy, Protesilaus was the first to land: "the first man who dared to leap ashore when the Greek fleet touched the Troad", Pausanias recalled, quoting the author of the epic tale called the Cypria. An oracle by Thetis had prophesied that the first Greek to walk on the land after stepping off a ship in the Trojan War would be the first to die, and so, after killing four men, he was himself slain by Hector. Alternate sources have him slain by either Aeneas, Euphorbus, Achates, or Cycnus. According to Ausonius's epitaph for Protesilaus, Odysseus tricked him by throwing his shield onto the beach and jumping on it. Thinking that Odysseus was thus the first who stepped on Trojan soil, Protesilaus jumped second and died afterwards. After Protesilaus's death, his brother, Podarces, joined the war in his place. The gods had pity on his widow, Laodamia, daughter of Acastus, and brought him up from Hades to see her. She was at first overjoyed, thinking he had returned from Troy, but after the gods returned him to the underworld, she found the loss unbearable. She had a bronze statue of her late husband constructed, and devoted herself to it. After her worried father had witnessed her behavior, he had it destroyed; however, Laodamia jumped into the fire with it. Another source claims his wife was Polydora, daughter of Meleager.

According to legend, the Nymphs planted elms on the tomb, in the Thracian Chersonese, of "great-hearted Protesilaus" («μεγάθυμου Πρωτεσιλάου»), elms that grew to be the tallest in the known world; but when their topmost branches saw far off the ruins of Troy, they immediately withered, so great still was the bitterness of the hero buried below. The story is the subject of a poem by Antiphilus of Byzantium (1st century A.D.) in the Palatine Anthology:

Θεσσαλὲ Πρωτεσίλαε, σὲ μὲν πολὺς ᾄσεται αἰών,
Tρoίᾳ ὀφειλoμένoυ πτώματος ἀρξάμενoν·
σᾶμα δὲ τοι πτελέῃσι συνηρεφὲς ἀμφικoμεῦση
Nύμφαι, ἀπεχθoμένης Ἰλίoυ ἀντιπέρας.
Δένδρα δὲ δυσμήνιτα, καὶ ἤν ποτε τεῖχoς ἴδωσι
Tρώϊον, αὐαλέην φυλλοχoεῦντι κόμην.
ὅσσoς ἐν ἡρώεσσι τότ᾽ ἦν χόλoς, oὗ μέρoς ἀκμὴν
ἐχθρὸν ἐν ἀψύχoις σώζεται ἀκρέμoσιν.

[:Thessalian Protesilaos, a long age shall sing your praises,
Of the destined dead at Troy the first;
Your tomb with thick-foliaged elms they covered,
The nymphs, across the water from hated Ilion.
Trees full of anger; and whenever that wall they see,
Of Troy, the leaves in their upper crown wither and fall.
So great in the heroes was the bitterness then, some of which still
Remembers, hostile, in the soulless upper branches.]

== Cult of Protesilaus ==
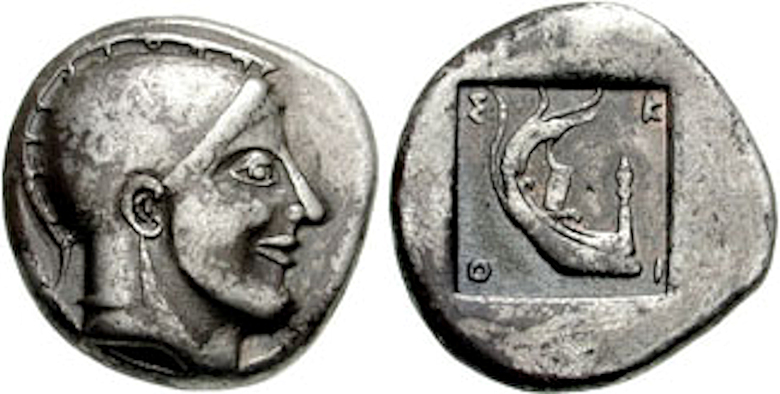
Coinage of Skione. Head of Protesilaos, wearing Attic helmet / Stern of galley left within incuse square. Circa 480-470 BC

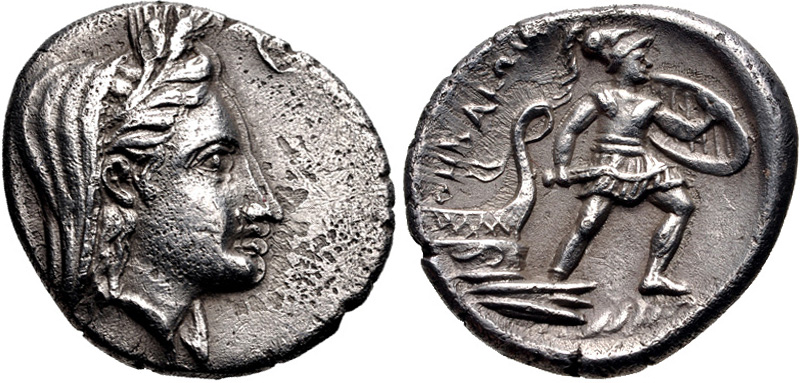
Coinage of Thebai, Thessaly. Veiled head of Demeter, wearing wreath of grain ears / ΘHBAIΩИ, Protesilaos, wearing armor and short chiton, holding sword in right hand and shield in left, stepping off the prow of a galley; waves visible to the lower right. Early 3rd century BC

Only two sanctuaries to Protesilaus are attested. There was a shrine of Protesilaus at Phylace, his home in Thessaly, where his widow was left lacerating her cheeks in mourning him, and games were organised there in his honour, Pindar noted. The tomb of Protesilaus at Elaeus in the Thracian Chersonese is documented in the 5th century BCE, when, during the Persian War, votive treasure deposited at his tomb was plundered by the satrap Artayctes, under permission from Xerxes. The Greeks later captured and executed Artayctes, returning the treasure. The tomb was mentioned again when Alexander the Great arrived at Elaeus on his campaign against the Persian Empire. He offered a sacrifice on the tomb, hoping to avoid the fate of Protesilaus when he arrived in Asia. Like Protesilaus before him, Alexander was the first to set foot on Asian soil during his campaign. Philostratus writing of this temple in the early 3rd century CE, speaks of a cult statue of Protesilaus at this temple "standing on a base which was shaped like the prow of a boat." Coins of Elaeus from the time of Commodus with Protesilaus on the prow of a ship, in helmet, cuirass and short chiton on the reverse probably depict this statue. Strabo also mentions the sanctuary.

A founder-cult of Protesilaus at Scione, in Pallene, Chalcidice, was given an etiology by the Greek grammarian and mythographer of the Augustan-era Conon that is at variance with the epic tradition. In this, Conon asserts that Protesilaus survived the Trojan War and was returning with Priam's sister Aethilla as his captive. When the ships go ashore for water on the coast of Pallene, between Scione and Mende, Aethilla persuaded the other Trojan women to burn the ships, forcing Protesilaus to remain and found the city of Scione. A rare tetradrachm of Scione ca. 480 BCE acquired by the British Museum depicts Protesilaus, identified by the retrograde legend PROTESLAS.

Protesilaus, speaking from beyond the grave, is the oracular source of the corrected eye-witness version of the actions of heroes at Troy, related by a "vine-dresser" to a Phoenician merchant in the framing device that gives an air of authenticity to the narratives of Philostratus's Heroicus, a late literary representation of Greek hero-cult traditions that developed independently of the epic tradition.

== Iconography ==
Among very few representations of Protesilaus, a sculpture by Deinomenes is just a passing mention in Pliny's Natural History; the outstanding surviving examples are two Roman copies of a lost mid-fifth century Greek bronze original representing Protesilaus at his defining moment, one of them in a torso at the British Museum, the other at the Metropolitan Museum of Art. The Metropolitan's sculpture of a heroically nude helmeted warrior stands on a forward-slanting base, looking down and slightly to his left, with his right arm raised, prepared to strike, would not be identifiable, save by comparison made by Gisela Richter with a torso of the same model and its associated slanting base, schematically carved as the prow of a ship encircled by waves: Protesilaus about to jump ashore.

== Works employing this myth ==
- "Dialogues of the Dead", by Lucian
- Protesilaos, a lost tragedy of Euripides of which only fragments survive
- "Protesilaodamia", a lost work of Laevius
- "carmen 61", "carmen 68", by Catullus
- "Elegies, to Cynthia", by Propertius
- "Heroicus", by Philostratus
- "The Epistles", 13, by Ovid
- "Laodamia", by William Wordsworth
- " Veeraanganaa", by Michael Madhusudan Dutt
- "Protesilas i Laodamia", by Stanisław Wyspiański
- ΠΡΩΤΕΣΙΛΑΟΣ, Η ΤΡΑΓΩΔΙΑ, ΤΟΥ Κωνσταντίνου Αθ. Οικονόμου, Λάρισα, 2010. [www.scribd.com/oikonomoukon]
- "The Elms of Protesilaus" by F. L. Lucas's (1927).
