= Thaumaci =

Town and polis (city-state) of Phthiotis in Ancient Thessaly

Coordinates: 39°07′50″N 22°17′51″E

Map showing ancient Thessaly. Thaumaci is shown to the lower centre, south of Pharsalus.

Thaumaci or Thaumacus (Ancient Greek: Θαυμακοί or Θαυμακός, romanized: Thaumakoi/Thaumakos), was a town and polis (city-state) of Phthiotis in Ancient Thessaly, was situated on the pass called Coela, on the road from Thermopylae and the Maliac Gulf passing through Lamia. The modern city of Domokos occupies its site.

At this place, says Livy, the traveller, after traversing rugged mountains and intricate valleys, comes suddenly in sight of an immense plain like a vast sea, the extremity of which is scarcely visible. From the astonishment which it excited in the traveller, the city was supposed to have derived its name. It stood upon a lofty and precipitous rock. It was besieged by Philip V of Macedon in 199 BCE; but a reinforcement of Aetolians having made their way into the town, the king was obliged to abandon the siege. Thaumaci was taken by the consul Acilius in the war with Antiochus, 191 BCE. The modern town of Domokos occupies the site of Thaumaci, and at this place inscriptions were found containing the ancient name. Its situation and prospect are in exact accordance with the description of Livy, who copied from Polybius, an eye-witness. William Martin Leake observes that "at the southern end of the town a rocky point, overtopping the other heights, commands a magnificent prospect of the immense plain watered by the Peneius and its branches." The town was Christianised at an early date and a bishopric was set up (see Thaumacensis).
