= Plarasa =

Inland town of ancient Caria

Coordinates: 37°37′26″N 28°38′04″E

Plarasa or Plarassa was an inland town of ancient Caria, inhabited during Roman times. At some point it, along with Tauropolis, became part of the territory of the Antiochia ad Maeandrum, after which an aqueduct which was built by Marcus Ulpius Carminius Claudianus (husband of Carminia Ammia) in the 2nd century to supply the combined community.

Plarasa is also noted to have resisted the Pompeian–Parthian invasion of 40 BC. After the war ended in Asia Minor, the city along with Miletus and Aphrodisias (which the latter was bounded with the Plarsa via a koinon) successfully dispatched envoys to the senate to get freedom in the winter of 39 BC.

Its site is located near Bingeç in Asiatic Turkey.
