= Friedrich Stählin =

Friedrich Stählin (8 April 1874, Nördlingen, Germany – 22 June 1936, Erlangen, Germany) was a German Classical Philologist and teacher. He studied the Classical Greek language and his book, Das hellenische Thessalien was published in 1924. He also contributed to the Realencyclopädie der classischen Altertumswissenschaft.
