= Almyros =

Almyros Αλμυρός
- Municipality
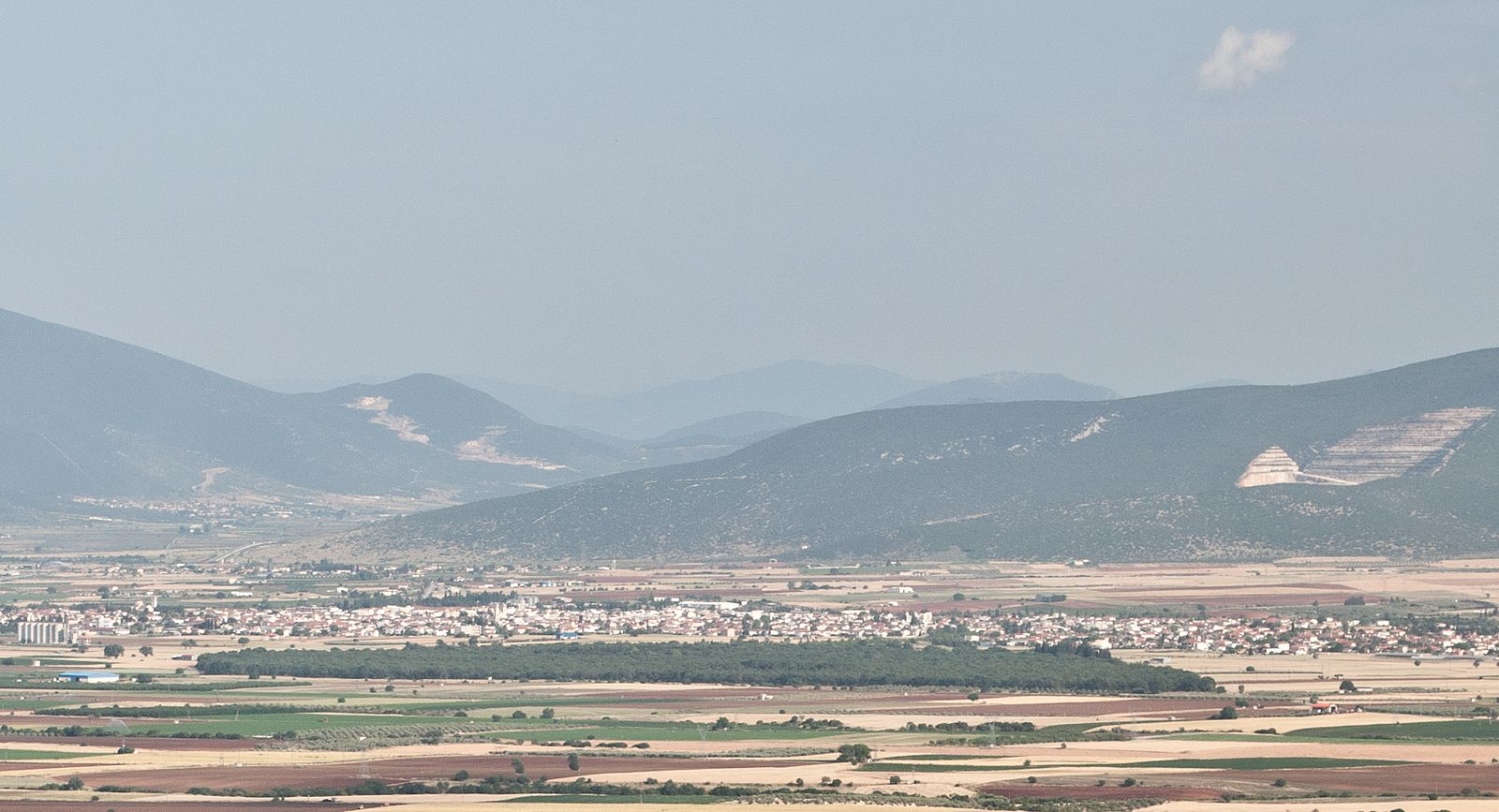
- View of Almyros and Kouri forest.

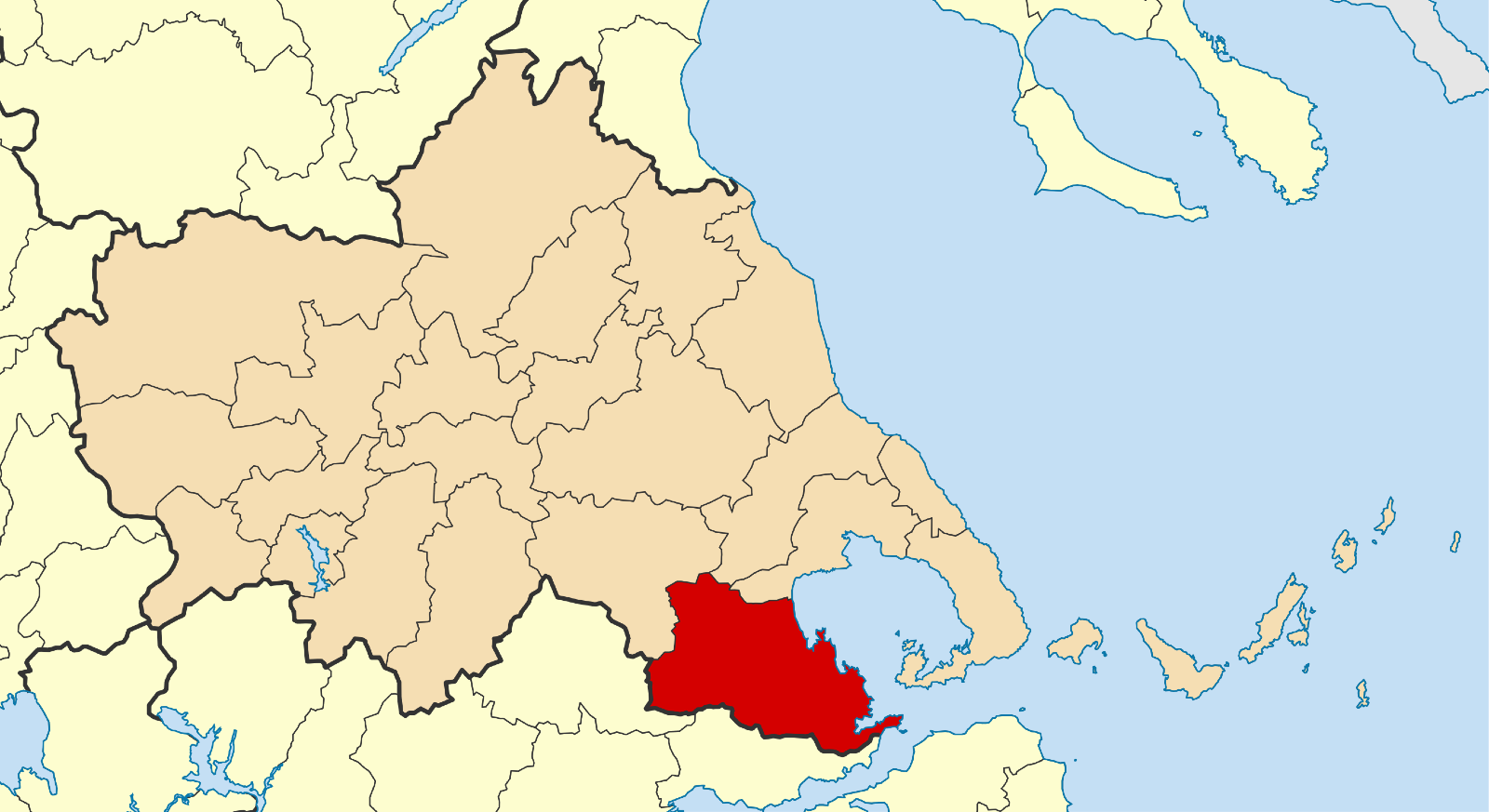

- Location within Greece
- Coordinates: 39°10′49″N 22°45′38″E
- Country: Greece
- Administrative region: Thessaly
- Regional unit: Magnesia

Government
  - Mayor: Dimitrios Eseridis (since 2023)

Area
  - Municipality: 905.4 km^{2} (349.6 sq mi)
  - Municipal unit: 473.9 km^{2} (183.0 sq mi)
- Elevation: 70 m (230 ft)

Population (2021)
  - Municipality: 16,072
  - Density: 17.75/km^{2} (45.98/sq mi)
  - Municipal unit: 11,192
  - Municipal unit density: 23.62/km^{2} (61.17/sq mi)
  - Community: 7,400
- Time zone: UTC+2 (EET)
  - Summer (DST): UTC+3 (EEST)
- Postal code: 371 00
- Area code: 24220
- Vehicle registration: ΒΟ
- Website: almyros-city.gr

Almyros or Halmyros (Greek: Αλμυρός, romanized: Almyrós, lit. 'salty') is a town and a municipality of the regional unit of Magnesia, region of Thessaly, Greece. It lies in the center of prosperous fertile plain known as 'Krokio Pedio', which is crossed by torrents. Almyros is an important agricultural and commercial center of Magnesia, and is also developing as a tourist center for the area. The main agricultural products are tomatoes, cotton, wheat, almonds, peanuts and pistachio nuts.

== History ==
The history of Almyros begins with the ancient city of Halos (about 10 km [6.2 mi] south of Almyros), the ruins of which can still be visited. Halos was a very important and populous town, famous for its port and for its role in the Persian Wars. After the Byzantine Empire, because of pirate raids, they built the town in the place that it is today.

Ancient Halos was still mentioned in the works of Stephanus of Byzantium (6th century). The medieval successor settlement of Halmyros is first mentioned in the 11th century, when it was listed as a Christian diocese. During the Middle Ages, sources refer to "two Halmyroi" (δύο Άλμυροι): one of these was at the same site as ancient Halos, 6 km southeast of the present-day town of Almyros, while the other was an associated port on the Pagasitic Gulf.

At the old acropolis of Halos, the remains of a couple of stone towers (one at the highest point of the acropolis, the other at the base, overlooking the modern motorway) attest to the site's continued existence in the Middle Ages. The lower town of Halmyros existed between two fortresses, one at the mouth of the Platanorrema and the other at the site of present-day Tsengeli (which is now inaccessible due to being the site of an airport). Almost nothing remains of either fortress. Remains of the old city walls have been found in the area between the two fortresses.

Medieval Halmyros owed a lot of its prosperity to the presence of Italian merchant groups who settled here (originally from places like Venice, Pisa, and Genoa). Several medieval Christian churches are attributed to these Italian communities: the church of St. George was built by the Venetians, and possibly also the now-gone church of St. Mark, while the former church of St. Jacob was built by the Pisans. There was also a strong Jewish community in medieval Halmyros. Warren Treadgold estimates the size of Halmyros's Jewish community at about 400 people during the 12th century.

In 1158, Halmyros was attacked and plundered by a naval force commanded by William I of Sicily. The Pisan church of St. Jacob was burned down in the attack. Halmyros's Venetian community was hit badly by the arrest of all Venetians living in Byzantine territory in 1171. In 1198, the "two Halmyroi" were mentioned for the first time, in a document under Alexios III Angelos granting special privileges to the Venetians. In the 1204 Partitio terrarum imperii Romaniae after the sack of Constantinople, the "duo Almiri" are mentioned among the Thessalian possessions of Alexios's wife, Euphrosyne Doukaina Kamatera. Halmyros was then assigned by Boniface of Montferrat as the place where the former Alexios III would reside as a private citizen. Later, Halmyros became a property of William of Larissa and later still was assigned to Margaret of Hungary, Boniface of Montferrat's widow.

Halmyros remained under Latin control until 1246, when it was reconquered by Michael II of Epirus. In 1259, Halmyros is attested as a theme. In 1265, a Venetian quarter was re-established in Halmyros, after the Venetians had previously been expelled. Rampant piracy is described as happening in the Halmyros area in the next decade, sometime before 1278. Halmyros was sacked in 1307, and in 1310 it was captured by the Catalan Company along with several other towns in southern Thessaly (namely Domokos, Gardikia, and Pharsalos).

Halmyros was the site of the decisive Battle of Halmyros on 15 March 1311, where the Catalan Company shattered the assembled feudal armies of Frankish Greece and conquered the Duchy of Athens.

In the 1300s, Halmyros began to lose its importance as a port town; the newly founded town of Golos (modern Volos) took its place.

In 1881 Almyros, along with most of Thessaly, was ceded to Greece.

In 1980 a catastrophic magnitude 6.5 earthquake destroyed most of the town.

== Municipality ==
The municipality Almyros was formed at the 2011 local government reform by the merger of the following 4 former municipalities, that became municipal units:

- Almyros
- Anavra
- Pteleos
- Sourpi

The municipality has an area of 905.4 km^{2} (349.6 sq mi), the municipal unit 473.940 km^{2} (183 sq mi).

=== Subdivisions ===
The municipal unit of Almyros is divided into the following communities: Almyros, Efxeinoupoli, Anthotopos, Kokkotoi, Kroki, Kofoi, Platanos, and Fylaki.

== Province ==
The province of Almyros (Greek: Επαρχία Αλμυρού) was one of the provinces of Magnesia. It had the same territory as the present municipality. It was abolished in 2006.

== Landmarks ==
- The Archaeological Museum of Almyros includes local artifacts and exhibits from the Neolithic period, through Mycenean, Geometric, Classical, Hellenistic periods, and later Roman years. Opposite the museum is the old High School, the Gymnasium of Almyros, which is a classic monumental building from the beginning of the 20th century. The Museum and Gymnasium are the oldest buildings in the area.
- The Kouri forest, about 2 km from the town of Almyros, at an elevation of 75 m (246 ft), encompasses 108 ha (266.9 acres) of lowland oak forest. The forest is flat (elevation gradient is less than 2%). Oaks belong to the species: Quercus pubescens, Quercus aegilops, Quercus pedunculiflora. There are footpaths, as well as a miniature train for a brief tour through the woods and over small bridges.
- The area is important to migratory birds, such as the mute swan, spoonbill, glossy ibis, and various herons.
- South of the town are the moderately wooded Othrys mountains. 17 km (10.6 mi) from the town of Almyros but still in Almyros province, high in the Othrys mountains, is the 12th century Monastery of Panagia Xenia, with wall paintings, treasuries, and a library.
- There are several sandy beaches in the municipality of Almyros.
- Almyros has three main churches: Agios Dimitrios, Agios Nikolaos and Evangelistria.

== Geography ==
Almyros is situated near the western end of the Pagasetic Gulf, 25 km (15.5 mi) southwest of Volos. The A1 motorway (Athens–Thessaloniki–Evzonoi) passes east of the town Almyros.

=== Climate ===
Climate data for Nea Anchialos Airport 1956-2010
Month	Jan	Feb	Mar	Apr	May	Jun	Jul	Aug	Sep	Oct	Nov	Dec	Year
Mean daily maximum °C (°F)	11.1 (52.0)	12.3 (54.1)	14.3 (57.7)	18.8 (65.8)	24.0 (75.2)	29.0 (84.2)	31.0 (87.8)	30.7 (87.3)	27.0 (80.6)	21.6 (70.9)	16.8 (62.2)	12.6 (54.7)	20.8 (69.4)
Mean daily minimum °C (°F)	2.8 (37.0)	3.4 (38.1)	4.8 (40.6)	7.7 (45.9)	12.1 (53.8)	16.3 (61.3)	18.6 (65.5)	18.5 (65.3)	15.7 (60.3)	12.1 (53.8)	8.2 (46.8)	4.5 (40.1)	10.4 (50.7)
Average precipitation mm (inches)	49.2 (1.94)	43.7 (1.72)	51.3 (2.02)	34.1 (1.34)	35.0 (1.38)	20.4 (0.80)	19.2 (0.76)	15.9 (0.63)	38.5 (1.52)	60.5 (2.38)	60.9 (2.40)	65.9 (2.59)	494.6 (19.48)
Average precipitation days	12.3	10.2	8.1	6.5	4.6	3.6	2.0	2.2	3.6	7.3	8.4	11.4	80.2

== Historical population ==
Year	Community	Municipal unit	Municipality
1981	6,730	–	–
1991	8,916	-	–
2001	8,243	13,198	–
2011	8,220	12,678	18,614
2021	7,400	11,192	16,072
