= Achaea Phthiotis =

Historical region of ancient Thessaly in ancient Greece

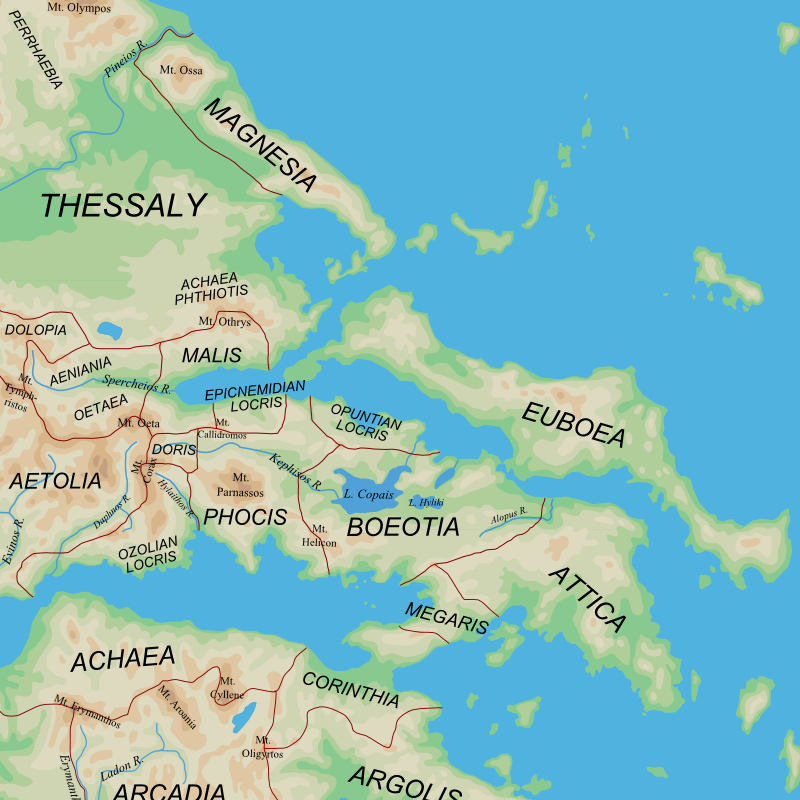
Map of the regions of ancient Central Greece

Achaea Phthiotis (Ancient Greek: Ἀχαΐα Φθιῶτις, lit. 'Achaea of Phthia') or simply ancient Phthiotis (Φθιῶτις) was a historical region of Thessaly, in ancient Greece.

It lay in southeastern Thessaly, between Mount Othrys and the northern shore of the Pagasetic Gulf. Inhabited by perioikoi, it was originally formally not a part of Thessaly proper but a Thessalian dependency, and had a seat of its own in the Delphic Amphictyony. From 363 BC it came under Boeotian control, but split away during the Lamian War. In the 3rd century BC it became a member of the Aetolian League, until declared free and autonomous by the Roman Republic in 196 BC, following the Second Macedonian War, and re-incorporated into Thessaly.

Phthiotis was inhabited by the Phthiotic Achaeans (Ἀχαιοὶ Φθιῶται), under which name they are usually mentioned as members of the Delphic Amphictyony. This district, according to Strabo, included the southern part of Thessaly, extending from the Maliac Gulf on the east, to Dolopia and Mount Pindus on the west, and stretching as far north as Pharsalus and the Thessalian plain. Phthiotis derived its name from the Homeric Phthia (Φθίη), which was the homeland of Achilles and appears to have included in the heroic times not only Hellas and Dolopia, which is expressly called the furthest part of Phthia, but also the southern portion of the Thessalian plain, since it is probable that Phthia was also the ancient name of Pharsalus. The cities of Phthiotis were: Amphanaeum or Amphanae, on the promontory Pyrrha and on the Pagasaean Gulf; Phthiotic Thebes, Eretria, Phylace, Iton, Halus, Pteleum, Antron, Larissa Cremaste, Proerna, Pras, Narthacium, Thaumaci, Melitaea, Coroneia, Xyniae, Lamia, Phalara, and Echinus.

It has given its name to the modern prefecture of Phthiotis, which however covers the southern and southwestern part of the ancient region. Most of ancient Phthiotis is today part of Magnesia (regional unit).

== See also ==
- Thessalian League
- Pherae
- Aetolian League
