= A1 motorway (Greece) =

Motorway in Greece

A1 motorway
- Αυτοκινητόδρομος Α1
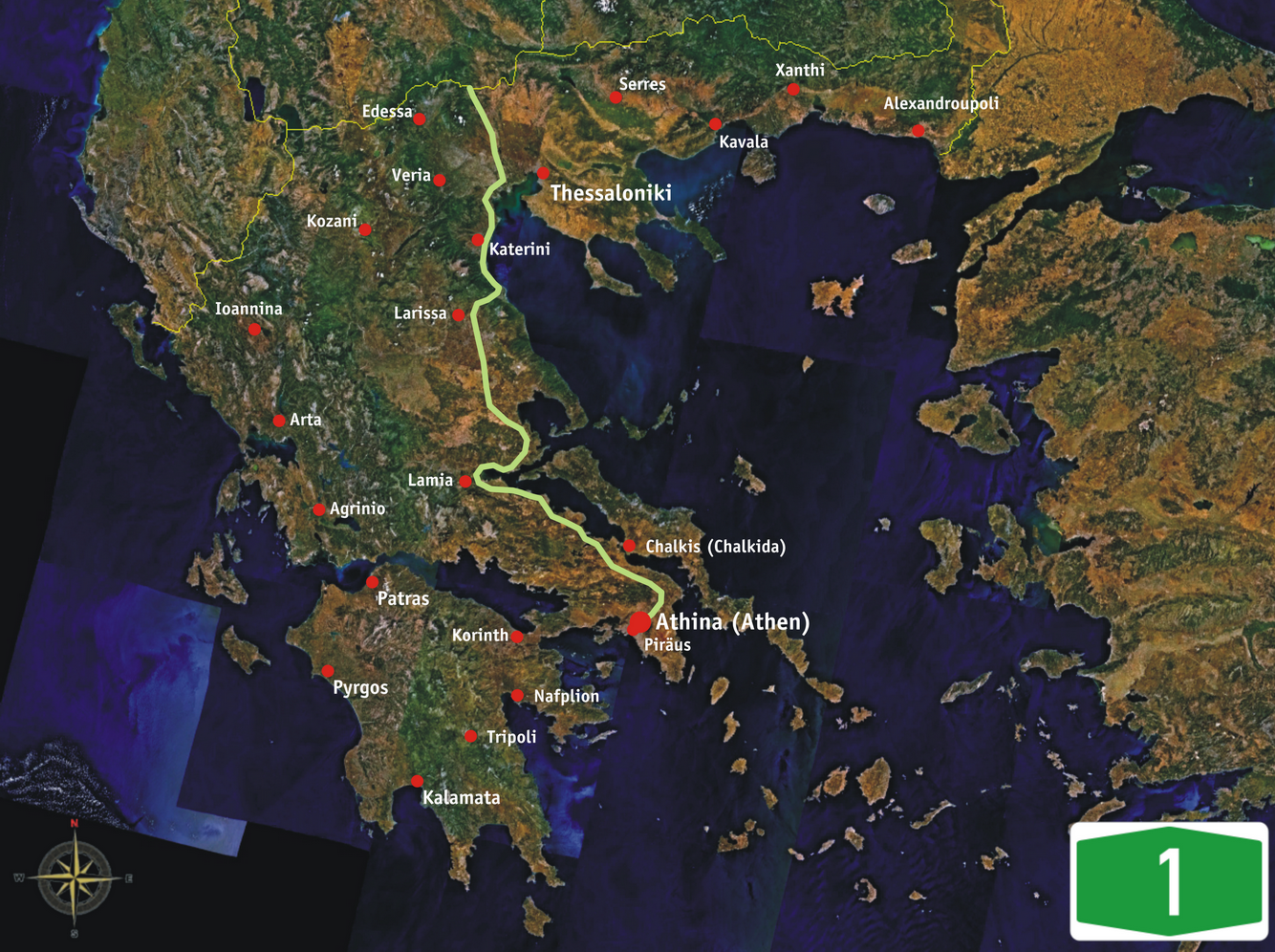

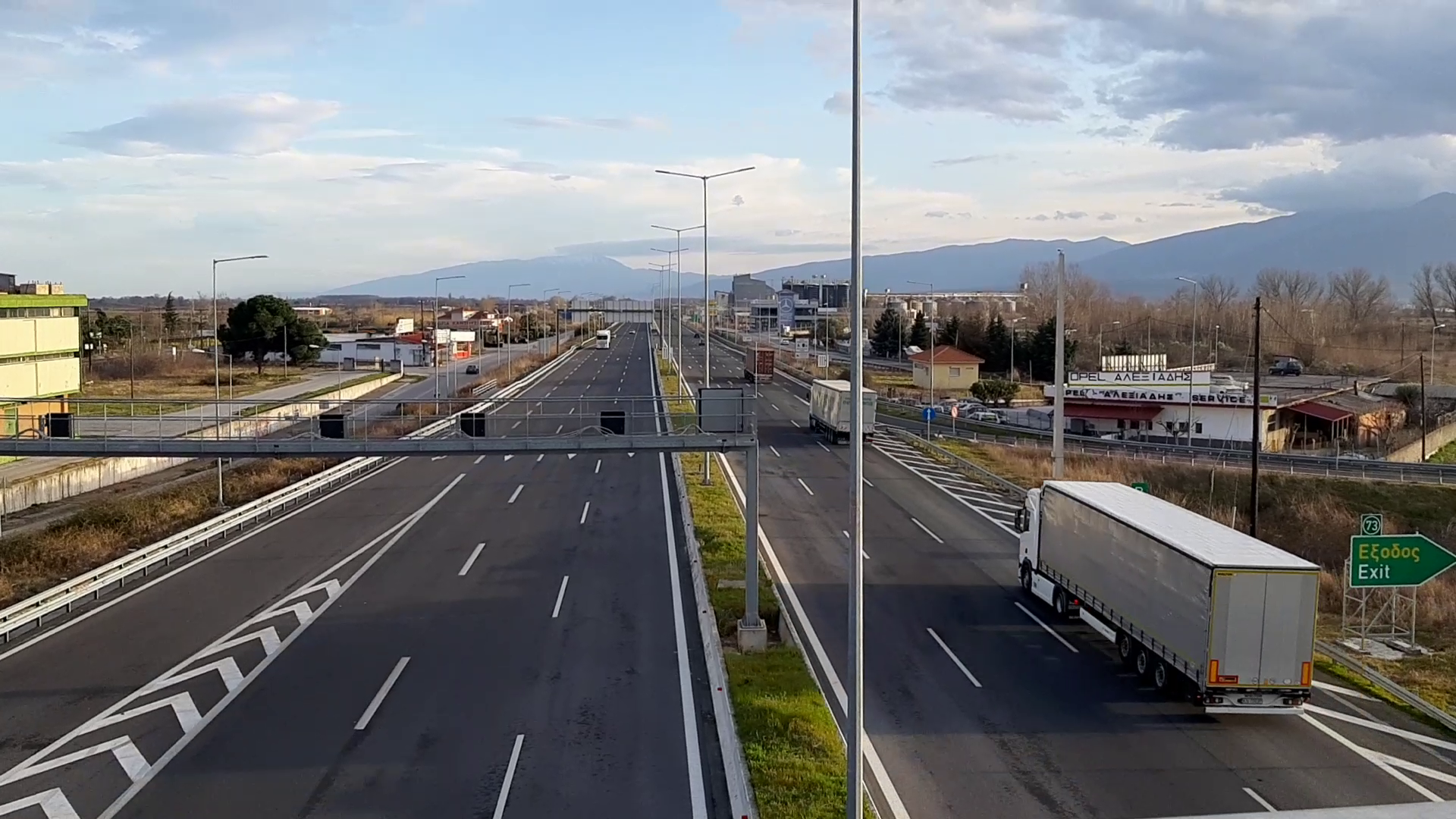
- A1 in Katerini

Route information
- Part of E65 (Thermopylae–Roditsa), E75, and E90 (Kleidi–Kalochori)
- Length: 557 km (346 mi)

Major junctions
- South end: Athens (Neo Faliro)
- North end: Thessaloniki / Border with North Macedonia (Evzonoi)

Location
- Country: Greece
- Regions: Attica; Central Greece; Thessaly; Central Macedonia
- Primary destinations: Athens (Neo Faliro); Metamorfosi; Lamia; Raches; Larissa; Katerini; Kleidi; Chalastra; Thessaloniki / Border with North Macedonia (Evzonoi)

Highway system
- Highways in Greece; Motorways; National roads
→ A11

The A1 motorway (Greek: Αυτοκινητόδρομος Α1) is the 2nd longest motorway in Greece with a length of 557 km. It is the principal north–south road connection in Greece, connecting the country's capital Athens with the regions of Thessaly and Macedonia, as well as the country's second largest city, Thessaloniki. It starts from Neo Faliro in Attica and continues north to reach the Evzonoi border station, on the Greek border with North Macedonia.

Today, the construction, operation and maintenance of the A1 motorway have been largely outsourced to private companies: Aftokinitodromos Aigaiou SA. (Kleidi, Imathia - Raches, Fthiotida), Kentriki Odos SA (Raches, Fthiotida - Skarfia, Fthiotida) and Nea Odos SA (Skarfia, Fthiotida - Metamorfosi, Attica). The section of Kleidi, Imathia-Evzoni since 2014 operates and is maintained by Egnatia Odos SA.

== Route ==
The motorway passes through Mainland Greece and has largely replaced National Road 1. It begins at Kifissou Avenue, Athens, just north of the Bay of Phaliro, and continues northward to Evzonoi, on the border with the country's northern neighbour, North Macedonia, where it continues as the A1. Before the European routes numbers were changed, the northern part from Efzoni to EO2 was E5N, while today the entire road is part of European route E75. The task of maintaining and charging for parts of the motorway has recently been ceded to private consortia, part of the deal for the construction of the A5 (Ionia Odos), the A3/E65, and the bypass of Tempe Valley.

The part west of downtown Athens runs over the Cephisus river and Kifissou Avenue. From north of the boundary of Voiotia - Phthiotis, up to near Velestino, the tollway runs close to the coast of the Aegean Sea. It then continues north of the Tempe Valley and up to the junction of the European route E90. It then shares a 25 km common part with the A2/E90 (on a west–east direction), and then, at the "Axios Interchange", continues north to Evzonoi and the national border with North Macedonia. Its total length is approximately 557 km.

=== Cities ===
The A1 motorway passes near major urban centers in the country:

1. Athens
2. Chalcis (20 km south - connection via A11)
3. Thebes
4. Lamia
5. Larissa
6. Katerini
7. Thessaloniki (20 km west - connection via the A2 motorway (Egnatia Odos) and Thessaloniki's New West Entrance)
8. Polykastro

=== Airports ===
The A1 motorway is connected to the following airports:

1. Thessaloniki (Macedonia Airport) (45 km west - connection via the A2 (Egnatia Odos) and the A24 Thessaloniki Ring Road)
2. Nea Anchialos - (10 km west - connection via National Road 30)
3. Athens (Eleftherios Venizelos Airport) - (25 km west - connection via the A6 motorway)

=== Harbours ===
The A1 motorway is connected to the following harbours:

1. Thessaloniki
2. Volos
3. Piraeus

=== Distances in kilometers ===
Distance in km	1	2	3	4	5	6	7	8	9	10	11
(1) Evzonoi	–	49	63	75	110	171	208	252	354	533	557
(2) Gefyra	49	–	12	26	61	122	159	203	305	505	501
(3) Axios	63	12	–	12	47	108	145	188	290	490	507
(4) Kleidi	75	49	12	–	35	98	135	178	280	480	497
(5) Katerini	110	61	47	35	–	61	98	141	243	443	460
(6) Evangelismos	171	122	108	98	61	–	37	80	182	382	399
(7) Larissa	208	159	145	135	108	37	–	43	145	345	362
(8) Velestino	252	212	198	186	151	80	43	–	102	302	319
(9) Lamia	354	305	293	279	244	183	146	102	–	200	217
(10) Athens	533	484	472	458	423	362	325	282	200	–	17

== History ==
=== 1950s-1970s ===
The only major road that connected Greece's two biggest cities was Greek National Road 1 at that time. More specifically, the national road connected Athens with the customs of Evzoni, through Dhekelia, Atalanti, Kamena Vourla, Thermopylae, Lamia, Stylida, Almyros, Velestino, Larissa, the Vale of Tempe, Katerini, Alexandria, Gefyra and Polykastro, following a path well established since Antiquity. However, over time, its specifications began to be considered obsolete, as in the rest of Europe modern highways began to be built. Construction on a new and modern road artery was thus started in the mid-1950s. The first section to open was the Larissa-Katerini, delivered in 1959. Later on, the Athens-Lamia and the Lamia-Larissa sections followed, opening in 1962 and 1967 respectively. The highway up to Thessaloniki and the Yugoslav border was completed in 1973, with the delivery of the Katerini - Thessaloniki - Evzoni section. For the most part it was 13 metres (43 ft) - 14 metres (46 ft) (except for the part through the Valley of Tempi, which was 10 metres (33 ft) due to mountainous terrain) and 2 traffic lanes (1 lane + 1 auxiliary lane in each direction), without a median strip. The Polykastro - Evzoni section was the first section with motorway specifications.

=== 1980-today ===
Work on the conversion to a motorway began in the mid-1980s, with the construction of the sections Klidi interchange- Gallikos river (delivered in 1988), Bogiati camp - Kryoneri interchange (delivered in 1989) (4.5 km), Inofyta interchange- Schimatari interchange (delivered in 1989) (12.5 km), Ritsona interchange - Thebes interchange (delivered in 1989) (14.8 km). In the early 1990s, work began on the entire length of the sections Athens - Thebes interchange, and Katerini - Klidi.

As early as 1995, National Road 1 had highway specifications in the sections Athens - Yliki, Katerini - Klidi - Thessaloniki and Polykastro - Evzoni.

In 1998, it had six lanes in the Athens (Metamorfosi) -Thebe section and four in the Thebes-Tempi section, with the exception of a few sections in Magnesia, which still had two.

In 2002 the Yliki-Agios Konstantinos section was completed.

In 2004 the first tunnel of the A1 was built, the tunnel of Katerini (tunnels of Alexander the Great and Philip), while in the same year Kifissos Avenue was handed over, which is the part of the road that connects Metamorfosi with Faliro, above the Kifissos river, inside Athens.

In November 2017, with the launch of the tender for the privatization of Egnatia Motorway and the announcement of its terms, it was announced that the upgrade of the Halastra-Polykastro section from an expressway to as motorway was under planning. This was confirmed in September 2018. Construction costs are estimated to exceed €200 million, and the remainder of the axis from Polykastro to Evzoni, which has already been characterized a motorway will be upgraded with more modern features such as safety barriers, new signage and road improvements.

In 2005, it was completed along its entire length, except for the "Horseshoe" of Maliakos and Tempi.

On June 13, 2007, the Aegean Motorway SA was established, which undertook the construction and operation of the motorway in the Raches-Klidi section.

In the same year, the first sections of Maliakos, the Agios Konstantinos Bypass, the Kamenon Vourlon Bypass and the 4.5 km long Agia Paraskevi-Agia Marina section were opened to traffic. In 2008 the Thermopylae-Bralos Bypass section was delivered.

In 2014, the Velestino interchange was completed, which connects ATHE with Volos.

In 2015, the last section of Maliakos Stylida-Raches with the tunnels of Stylida, with the upgraded Lamia interchange and the new bridge of Sperchios (bypass of Lamia) was handed over to traffic.

In 2016, the northern interchange of Katerini was completed, after about 26 years of construction, due to expropriation and financing problems. On April 6, 2017, the section Evangelismos - Skotina (bypass of Tempi and Platamonas), 25 km long, was delivered. In November 2017, with the start of the tender for the privatization of Egnatia Odos and the announcement of its terms, it became known that the HRDH may include in the object of the Concession Agreement the upgrade of the section Halastra - Polykastro from expressway to motorway, which was confirmed in September 2018. The construction cost is estimated to exceed 200 million euros, while the rest of the axis from Polykastro to Evzoni, which already has highway features, will be upgraded with more modern features such as safety railings, new signage and pavement improvement.

== Exit list ==
The exits of the completed sections of the A1 motorway:

Notes
Under construction
Planned

Regional unit	Exit	Name	Destinations	Notes/Also as
Kilkis		Evzonoi border crossing (North Macedonia)	M1 E75; North Macedonia	5-gate customs Speed limit 20 Height limit 4.5 m. northern terminus of the A1
Kilkis		Bus and truck customs	North Macedonia (for buses and trucks)	one-exit interchange without ramps
Kilkis		Evzonoi	EO1	E75
Kilkis		Polykastro		E75
			Rest Area of Polykastro	
Thessaloniki		Agios Athanasios	EO2 E86	E75
Thessaloniki	19	Axios interchange	A2 E90	E75
Thessaloniki	18	Nea Malgara		E75 E90
Imathia	17	Kleidi interchange	West: A2 ( E90): Kozani, Veria, Ioannina	E75
Pieria		Aiginio		E75
Pieria		Nea Agathoupoli		E75
Pieria		Makrygialos		E75
Pieria			Rest Area of Korinos	
Pieria		Korinos		E75
Pieria		Katerini North, Paralia	Katerini Ring Road, Paralia, Kallithea	E75
Pieria		Katerini East	EO1	E75
Pieria		Fillipos Tunnel (1095 m) (southbound)	Alexandros Tunnel (1100 m) (northbound)	
Pieria		Katerini South	Olympiaki Akti	E75
Pieria		Nea Efesos	Nea Efesos, Kontariotissa	E75
Pieria		Paralia Litochorou, Dion	Dion	E75
Pieria		Litochoro	West: Litochoro, Mount Olympus East: Plaka	E75
Pieria		Plaka Litochorou	Plaka	E75
Pieria		Leptokarya, Skotina	EO1 East: Leptokarya, Paralia Skotinas	E75
Pieria			Rest Area of Skotina	
Pieria		Platamonas Tunnel (T3) (2700 m)	Platamonas Tunnel (T3) (2700 m)	
Pieria		Platamonas, Neoi Poroi		E75
Larissa		Rapsani		E75
Larissa		Tempe Tunnel 2 (T2) (6000 m)	Tempe Tunnel 2 (T2) (6000 m)	
Larissa		Tempe Tunnel 1 (T1) (2000 m)	Tempe Tunnel 1 (T1) (2000 m)	
Larissa		Evangelismos, Makrychori	EO1	E75
Larissa			Rest Area of Evangelismos	
Larissa		Larissa 1	EO1 (Also to Kozani)	E75
Larissa		Larissa 2		E75
Larissa		Larissa 3	EO6	E75
Larissa		Larissa 4 (Also to Trikala and Karditsa)	EO1a E92	E75
Larissa		Kileler		E75 E92
Larissa		Mega Monastiri		E75 E92
Magnesia		Velestino; Volos	EO6 E92	E75
Magnesia		Aerino	EO1	E75
Magnesia		Mikrothives; Volos; Farsala	EO30	E75
Magnesia		Almyros		E75
Magnesia		Sourpi		E75
Magnesia			Rest Area of Almyros	
Magnesia		Agioi Theodoroi	EO1	E75
Phthiotis		Pelasgia		E75
Phthiotis		Raches	EO1	E75
Phthiotis		Paralia Rachon	EO1	E75
Phthiotis		Karavomylos	EO1a	E75
Phthiotis		Stylida		E75
Phthiotis		Agia Marina	EO1a	E75
Phthiotis		Agia Paraskevi		E75
Phthiotis		Lamia 1	EO1	E75
Phthiotis			Rest Area of Lamia	
Phthiotis		Lamia 2	Connection to A3 E65	E75
Phthiotis		Bralos	Thermopylae–Antirrio E65	E75
Phthiotis		Thermopyles		E75
Phthiotis		Molos		E75
Phthiotis		Kainourgio		E75
Phthiotis		Kamena Vourla		E75
Phthiotis		Latomeio		E75
Phthiotis		Agios Konstantinos		E75
Phthiotis		Longos		E75
Phthiotis		Arkitsa		E75
Phthiotis		Livanates		E75
Phthiotis		Atalanti		E75
Phthiotis		Tragana		E75
Phthiotis		Malesina		E75
Phthiotis		Martino		E75
Boeotia		Kastro		E75
Boeotia	33	Akraifnio		E75
Boeotia	31	Thebes barracks		E75
Boeotia		Thebes		E75
Boeotia			Rest Area of Tanagra	
Boeotia	30	Ritsona	EO44	E75
Boeotia		Schimatari		A1 southbound access to A11 E75
Boeotia		Chalcis interchange	A11	E75
Boeotia		Oinoi		E75
East Attica		Oinofyta		E75
East Attica			'Serios' Rest Area	
East Attica		Malakasa	EO79	E75
East Attica		Markopoulo		E75
East Attica		Kapandriti	EO81	E75
East Attica		Afidnes		E75
East Attica		Agios Stefanos	EO83	E75
North Athens		Varympompi		E75
North Athens		Kifisia		E75
North Athens		Lykovrysi		E75
North Athens		Metamorfosi		E75
North Athens		Metamorfosi interchange	A6 E94	E75
Central Athens		Anagenniseos Street		E75
Central Athens		Krestenis Street		E75
Central Athens		Vryoulon Street		E75
Central Athens		Acharnon Street		E75
Central Athens		Agioi Anargyroi		E75
Central Athens		Liosion Street		E75
Central Athens		Patisia		E75
Central Athens		Peristeri north		E75
Central Athens		Konstantinoupoleos Avenue		E75
Central Athens		Ethnarchou Makariou Street		E75
Central Athens		Peristeri south	EO8	E75
West Athens		Iera Odos		E75
West Athens		Petrou Ralli Avenue		E75
Piraeus		Agias Annis Street		E75
Piraeus		Peiraios Street	EO56	E75
Piraeus		Piraeus	E75	southern terminus of the A1

== Gallery ==
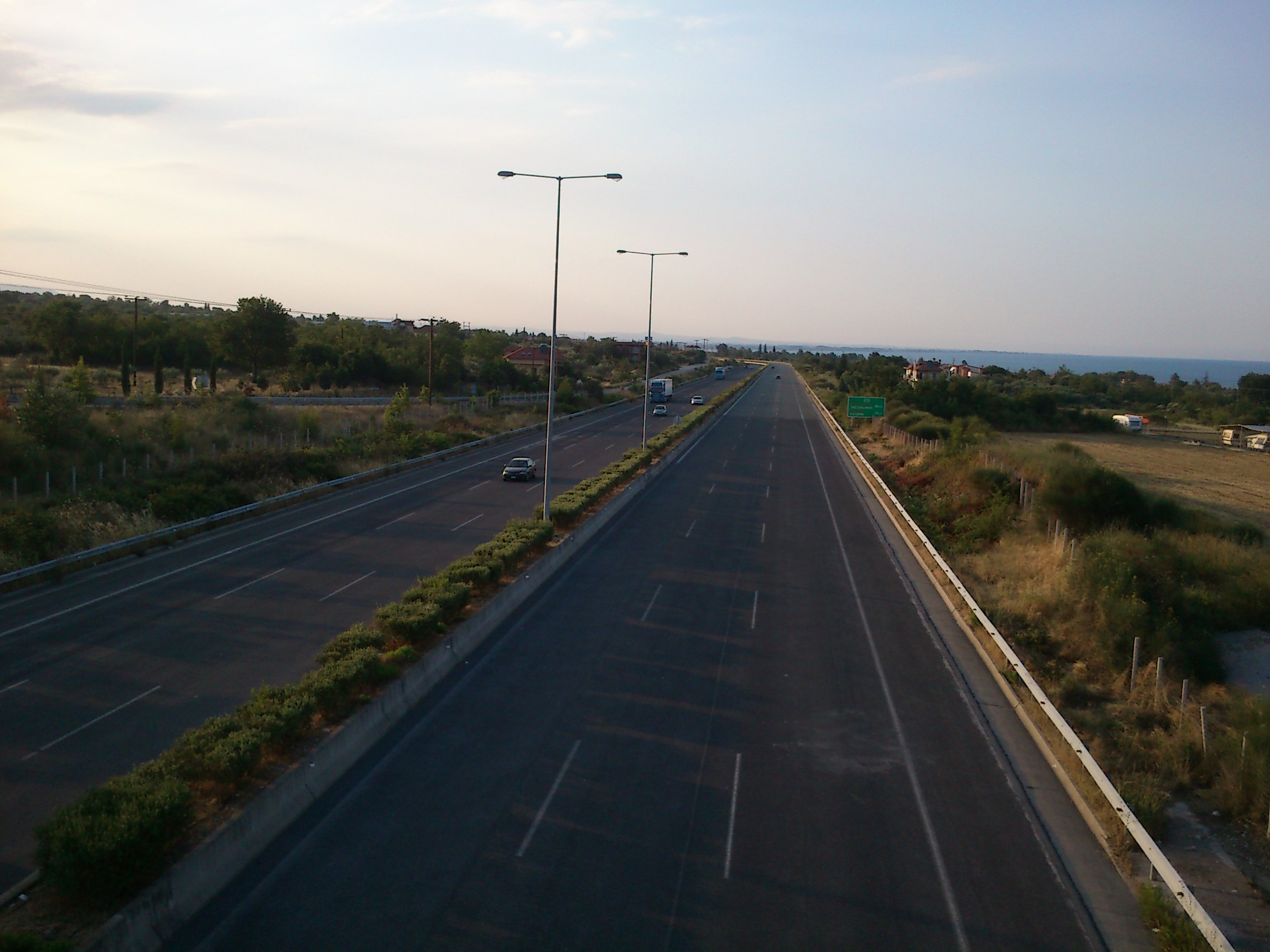
A1 Motorway near Katerini

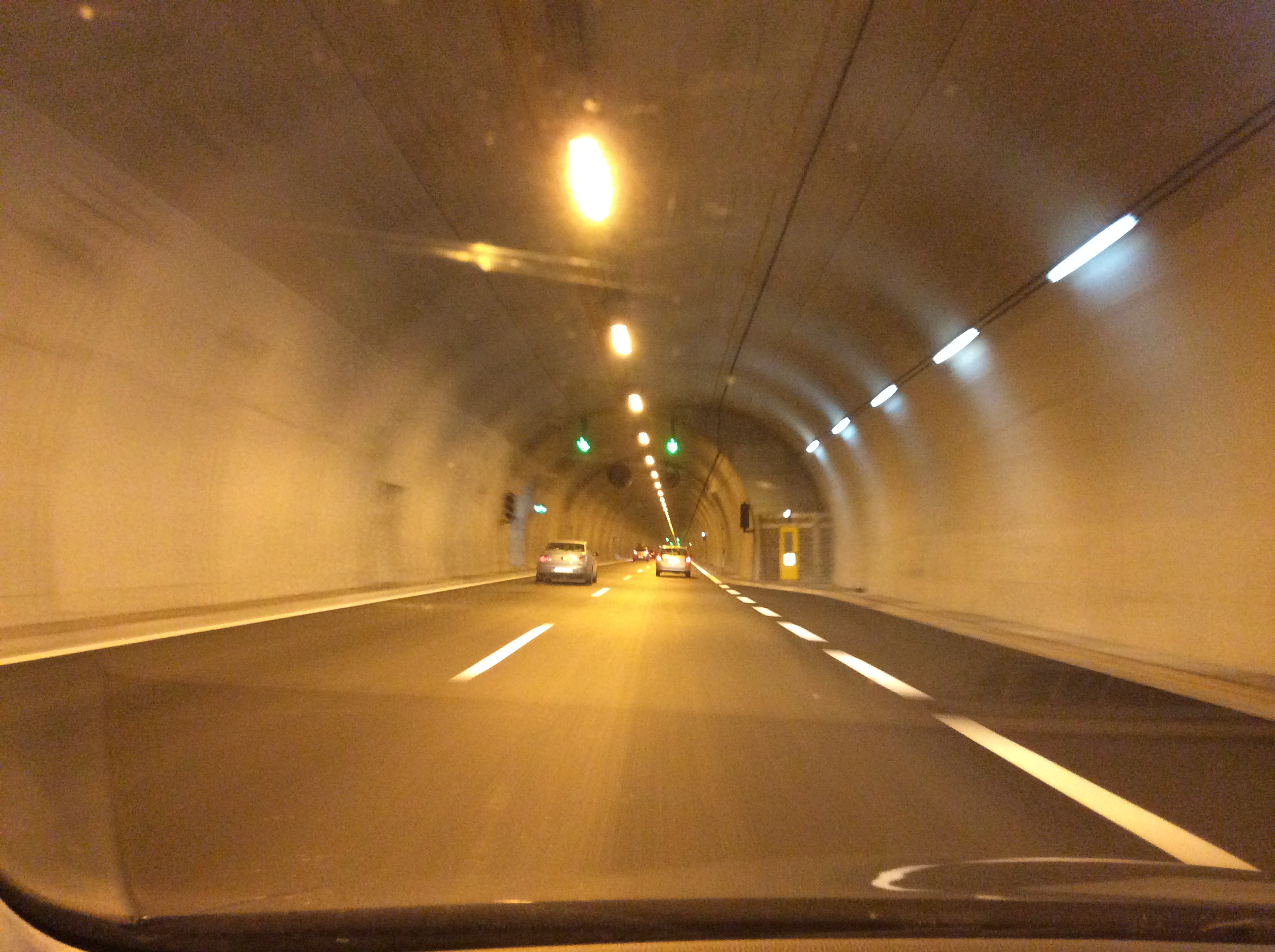
A1 Motorway tunnel near Agios Konstantinos

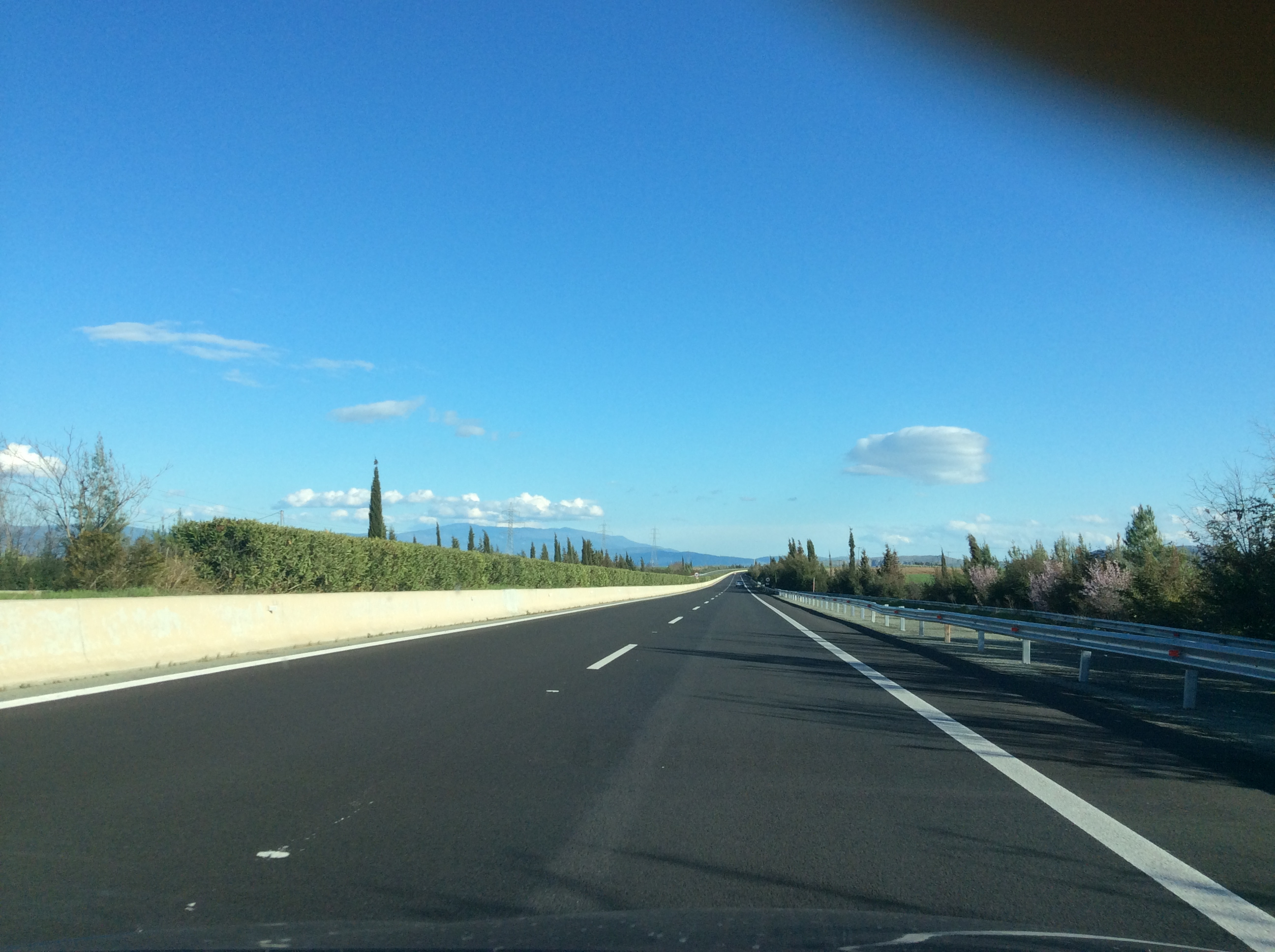
A1 Motorway close to Larissa

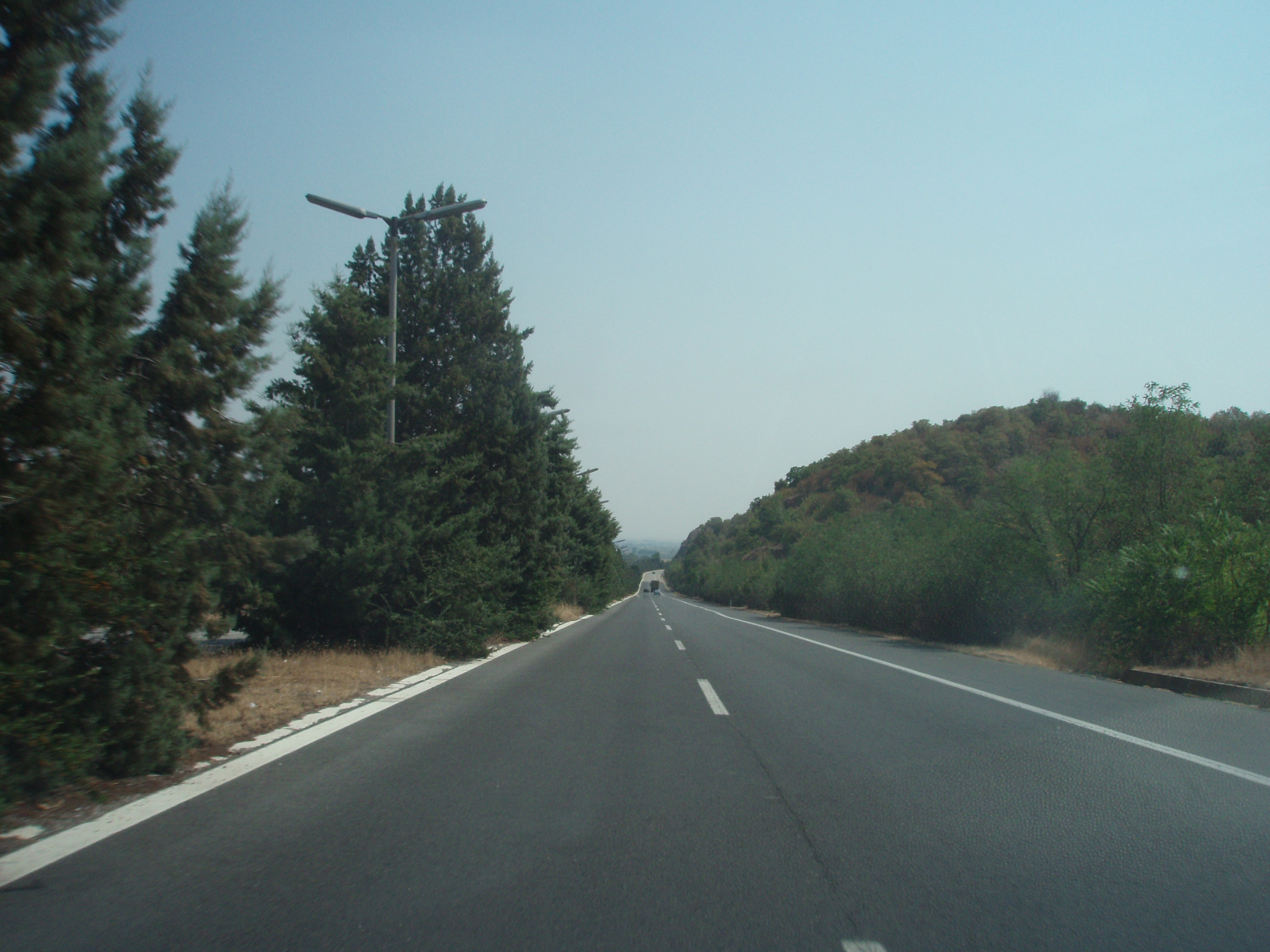
A1 near the Greek border with North Macedonia at Evzoni

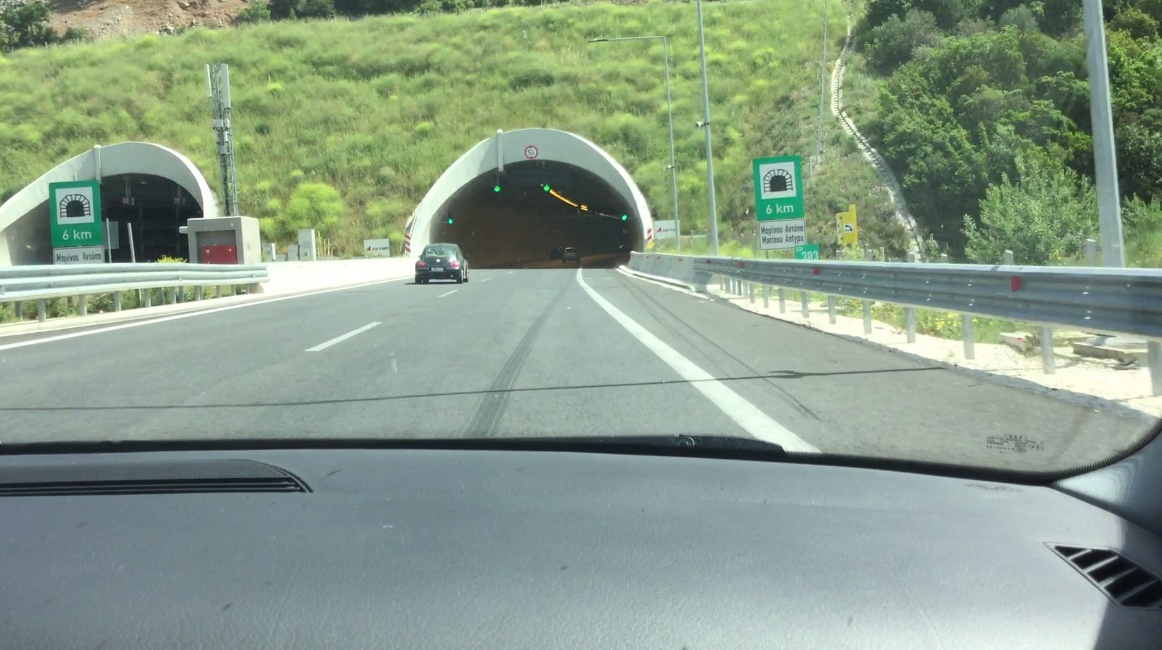
A1 Motorway's biggest tunnel, Tempi T2 Tunnel
