= Greek National Road 1a =

Trunk road in Greece

National Road 1a
- Εθνική Οδός 1α
- Route of the EO1a road, in blue

Route information
- Auxiliary route of EO1
- Length: 29.7 km (18.5 mi)
- Existed: 15 December 1995–present

Major junctions
- South end: Agia Marina
- North end: Thessaloniki

Location
- Country: Greece
- Regions: Central Greece; Thessaly; Central Macedonia
- Primary destinations: Agia Marina; Stylida; Achinos; Nikaia; Larissa; Thessaloniki (Palaio Stathmou)

Highway system
- Highways in Greece; Motorways; National roads
← EO1	→ EO2

Greek National Road 1a (Greek: Εθνική Οδός 1α), abbreviated as the EO1a, is a national road in central and northern Greece. The EO1a was originally built as a "new road" that ran mostly parallel to the EO1, a major north-south national road that runs between Athens and Evzonoi. While almost all of the EO1a have been replaced by the A1 motorway, some sections survive.

== History ==
Ministerial Decision DMEO/e/O/1308 of 15 December 1995 originally defined the EO1a as a Y-shaped "New National Road" (Greek: Νέα Εθνική Οδός), that ran from Neo Faliro in the south to Evzonoi and Thessaloniki in the north. The road, alternatively abbreviated as the NEO1, ran mostly parallel to the EO1: however, the EO1a bypassed most cities that the EO1 passed through, such as Athens to the west (by following the Cephissus river), Larissa to the east, Alexandreia and Chalkidona. The EO1a also had a branch that the EO1 did not, from Chalastra to Thessaloniki.

== Current route ==
Most of the EO1a has been replaced by the A1 motorway, but three sections survived the upgrades as of April 2026:

- In Stylida, the EO1a between Agia Marina and Achinos was not upgraded to a motorway, with the A1 instead bypassing Stylida and Karavomylos to the north.
- In Larissa, the EO1a between Nikaia and the junction with the EO1 and EO6 (east of the city centre) was not upgraded, with the A1 instead bypassing Larissa further east: this section also connects with the eastern end of the Larissa Southern Bypass, which bypasses the city centre to the south.
- In Thessaloniki, the EO1a runs between the western end of the Thessaloniki Inner Ring Road and the city centre: the eastern end of this section connects with the EO2, EO16 and the Nea Diagonios.
