= Driskos Tunnel =

Road tunnel near Ioannina, Greece

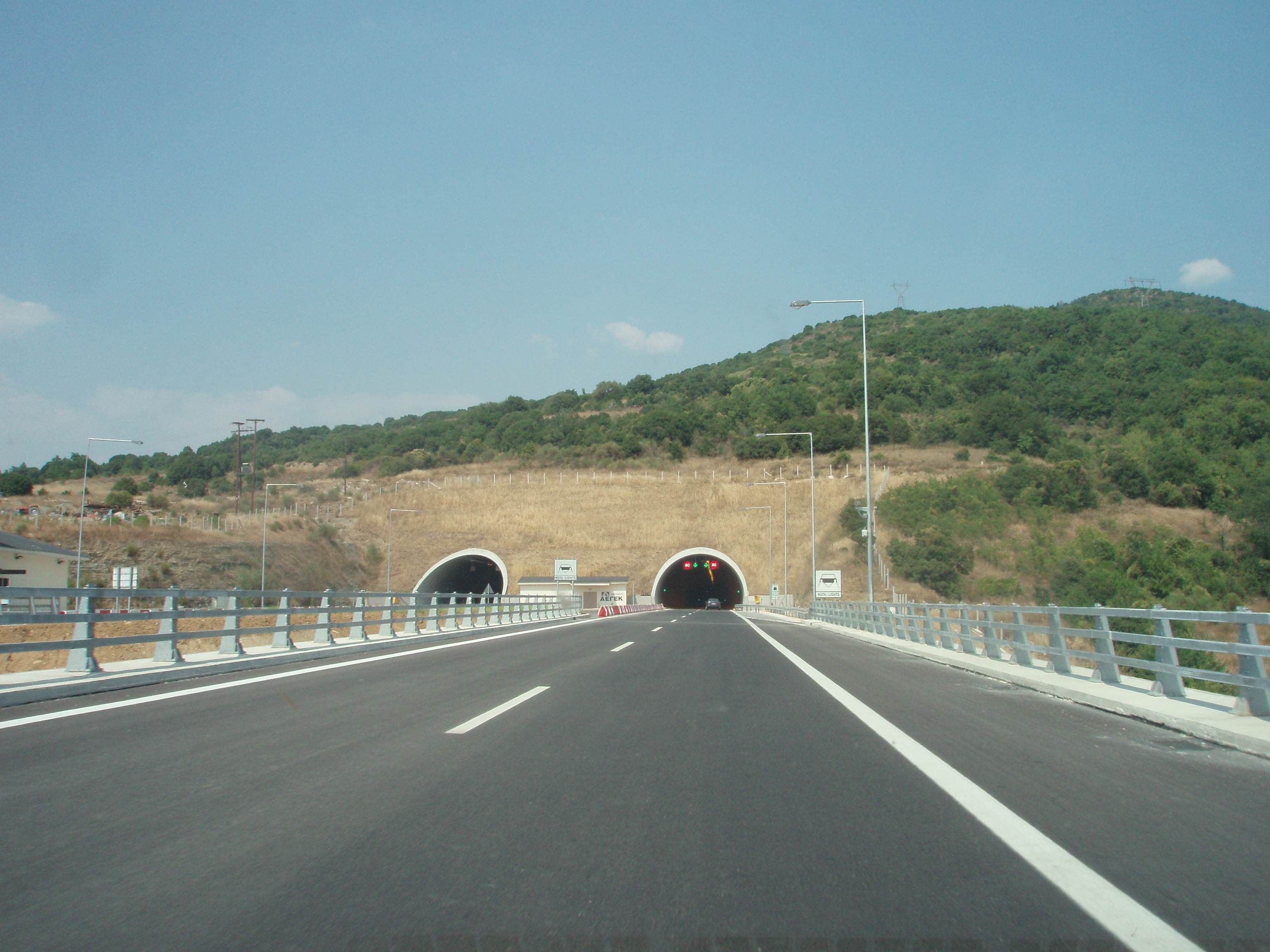
- Interactive map of Driskos Tunnel

Overview
- Location: Ioannina, Greece
- Coordinates: 39°39′24.9″N 20°57′38.0″E
- Status: Operational

Operation
- Work began: 1999
- Opened: 18 June 2008
- Operator: Egnatia Odos S.A.
- Traffic: automotive
- Character: Twin-tube motorway tunnel

Technical
- Length: 4,570 m (4.57 km)
- No. of lanes: 2x2

The Driskos Tunnel (Greek: Σήραγγα Δρίσκου) is a 4,570 metres (4.57 km) long twin-tunnel on the A2 motorway (Egnatia Odos highway) in northern Greece. Tunnel construction started in 1999 and finished in 2004. The two parallel tunnels were dug using the drill and blast method and designed for a 120 year life. The construction faced challenges, as it was built passing under the Mitsikeli mountain, containing sandstone.

It is the longest road tunnel of the whole A2 and it was the longest in Greece, until the 6 kilometres long T2 Tunnel of the A1 motorway completed in 2017.
