= Greek National Road 1 =

Trunk road in Greece

National Road 1
- Εθνική Οδός 1
- Route of the EO1 road, in blue

Route information
- Part of E65 (Roditsa–Lamia)
- Length: 415.2 km (258.0 mi)
- Existed: 9 July 1963–present

Major junctions
- South end: Athens
- North end: Border with North Macedonia (near Evzonoi)

Location
- Country: Greece
- Regions: Attica; Central Greece; Thessaly; Central Macedonia
- Primary destinations: Athens; Sfendali; Kamena Vourla; Thermopylae; Lamia; Stylida; Almyros; Velestino; Larissa; Tempi; Katerini; Alexandreia; Chalkidona; Gefyra; Polykastro; Evzonoi; Border with North Macedonia

Highway system
- Highways in Greece; Motorways; National roads
→ EO1a

Greek National Road 1 (Greek: Εθνική Οδός 1), abbreviated as the EO1, is a national road in Greece. It was originally a major north–south route that ran from Athens to the international border with the former Yugoslavia (now with North Macedonia) Today, the A1 motorway has absorbed most of EO1's original alignment, with the EO1 running parallel to most of the A1 for non-motorway traffic.

== Original route ==
Ministerial Decision G25871 of 9 July 1963 officially defined the EO1 as a major north–south route between Athens to the south and Evzonoi and the international border with the former Yugoslavia (now with North Macedonia) to the north: the decree specified that the EO1 would pass through Decelea, Sfendali, Martino, Atalanti, Kamena Vourla, Thermopylae, Lamia, Stylida, Almyros, Velestino, Larissa, Tempe, Katerini, Alexandreia, Chalkidona, Gefyra and Polykastro. The EO1 overlapped with the EO6 from Velestino to Larissa, and with the EO2 from Chalkidona to Gefyra.

== Present route ==
Today, the A1 motorway has absorbed most of EO1's original alignment, although the EO1 continues to run alongside most of the A1 for non-motorway traffic. However, there is a motorway-only gap west of Lake Yliki, requiring non-motorway traffic to detour via Thebes and Aliartos on the EO3. Additionally, the border crossing itself, north of Evzoni, is only open to motorway traffic.

A small section of the EO1 is tolled, near Pyrgetos (coordinates 39.909080°N 22.624390°E): the toll station, operated by Aegean Motorway, used to be on the southern end of a section of the A1 motorway, before the bypass around the Vale of Tempe opened in April 2017.

At Lamia, the EO1 is connected to the EO3 with the Lamia Eastern Bypass: the bypass, along with another small section of the EO1 between Roditsa and Lamia, are part of European route E65. There are plans to reroute the E65 away from those segments, after the A3 is connected to the A2 (Egnatia Odos), but this would require amending Annex I of the European Agreement on Main International Traffic Arteries (AGR) to reroute the E65 away from Larissa and Domokos (as currently defined).

== History ==
The EO1, as created by Ministerial Decision G25871 in 1963, was similar to the old EO1, which existed by royal decree from 1955 to 1963: however, the old EO1 followed the route of the current EO8 to Elefsina and then the EO3 up to Larissa, and the northernmost destination was Thessaloniki, instead of Polykastro and Evzonoi. The current EO1 replaced all or part of the following roads that existed from 1955 to 1963:

- The old EO2, from Athens to Lamia
- The old EO15, from Lamia to Velestino
- The old EO14, from Velestino to Larissa
- The old EO38, from Gefyra to Evzonoi

Until 1975, the EO1 formed part of the old European route E92 from Athens to Lamia and from Alexandreia to Gefyra, the old E87 from Velestino to Larissa, and the old E5 from Gefyra to Evzonoi.
