= Avlaki =

Avlaki Αυλάκι
- Community
- Location within Greece
- Coordinates: 38°54′34″N 22°33′25″E
- Country: Greece
- Administrative region: Central Greece
- Regional unit: Phthiotis
- Municipality: Stylida
- Municipal unit: Stylida

Population (2021)
  - Community: 502
- Time zone: UTC+2 (EET)
  - Summer (DST): UTC+3 (EEST)
- Vehicle registration: ΜI

Avlaki (Greek: Αυλάκι) is a village in the regional unit of Phthiotis, Central Greece. It is part of the municipality of Stylida.

== Location and history ==
Avlaki lies some 13 kilometres (8.1 mi) east of Lamia, near the northern coast of the Malian Gulf.

Avlaki is first mentioned (Aulachi) in 1423, when it and Stylida were transferred to the Republic of Venice by the Byzantine governor of Lamia, in order to protect them from being captured by the Ottoman Empire. The village was nevertheless likely captured by the Ottomans in 1444. A medieval fort, known locally as Palaiopyrgos, using ancient spolia, was located on the shore. Its remains were extant in the 1920s, but have since vanished.

Another nearby hill shows traces of fortifications, theorized to be either medieval Ravennika or the ancient city of Phalara.

It became part of the newly independent Kingdom of Greece, and in 1835 it became part of the municipality of Falara. On 6 July 1929, it became (ΦΕΚ 221Α) a separate commune. With the 1997 Kapodistrias reform it became part of the Municipality of Stylida. According to the 2021 Greek census, it has 502 inhabitants.
