= Tempi road crash =

2003 traffic accident in Greece

- Location: 39°52′33″N 22°35′14″E; Athens-Thessaloniki National Road, Tempi, Thessaly, Greece
- Date: April 13, 2003; 23 years ago 19:30
- Deaths: 21
- Injuries: 32
- Victim: 53

On the evening of 13 April 2003, a timber truck collided with a bus carrying students and teachers in the Tempi Valley in central Greece. Twenty-one students were killed.

The crash was caused by the truck driver's loss of control and the movement of his cargo, which was ejected from the truck and cut into the bus.

The incident is the deadliest traffic accident in Greece. Following the disaster, legislation was passed regarding fatal traffic accidents, the traffic of heavy and towed vehicles, and the hours and days of their traffic.

== Background ==
The bus was carrying 49 students and 3 teachers from the General Lyceum of Makrochori, Imathia. They had been on a trip to Athens and were returning to Makrochori along the A1 motorway. The truck driver was carrying a load of wooden sheets from Provatonas, Evros.

At that time, a large percentage of the Athens-Thessaloniki road network had no central reservation between the traffic lanes, and the narrow morphology of the Tempi Valley restricted road width, with only one traffic lane per direction.

== Crash ==
Shortly before 19:30, the driver of the truck lost control of his vehicle and found himself in oncoming traffic. Although the bus driver managed to avoid a direct head-on collision, the truck's load was ejected and entered the bus, cutting its left side in two. Twenty-one students were killed, four were seriously injured and hospitalized in intensive care, and the rest sustained injuries.

== Investigation ==
Multiple factors were determined to have contributed to the crash: the driver was suffering fatigue having been driving beyond his permitted hours, the truck's tyres were worn, the load was incorrectly fastened and five tons overweight, and the bus was old and should have been withdrawn from use. It is possible that the two vehicles were speeding, as they had removed the speed limit from their tachographs.

== Trial ==
The trial began in March 2005 with defence counsel Alexis Kougias and was practically completed in September 2010 at the Supreme Court. The six convicted by the decision of the Mixed Assured Court of Larissa had submitted an appeal to the Supreme Court, which was ultimately rejected.

The bus driver was acquitted in the trial. The truck driver, Dimitris Dolas, was sentenced to 15 years in prison. The two co-owners of the truck received 14- and 11-year sentences. Three others associated with the timber delivery received sentences of three and four years. The civil damages were set by the first instance court at 10 million euros in June 2005, which was reduced to 8.5 million euros when the case was closed at the Supreme Court.

== Legacy ==
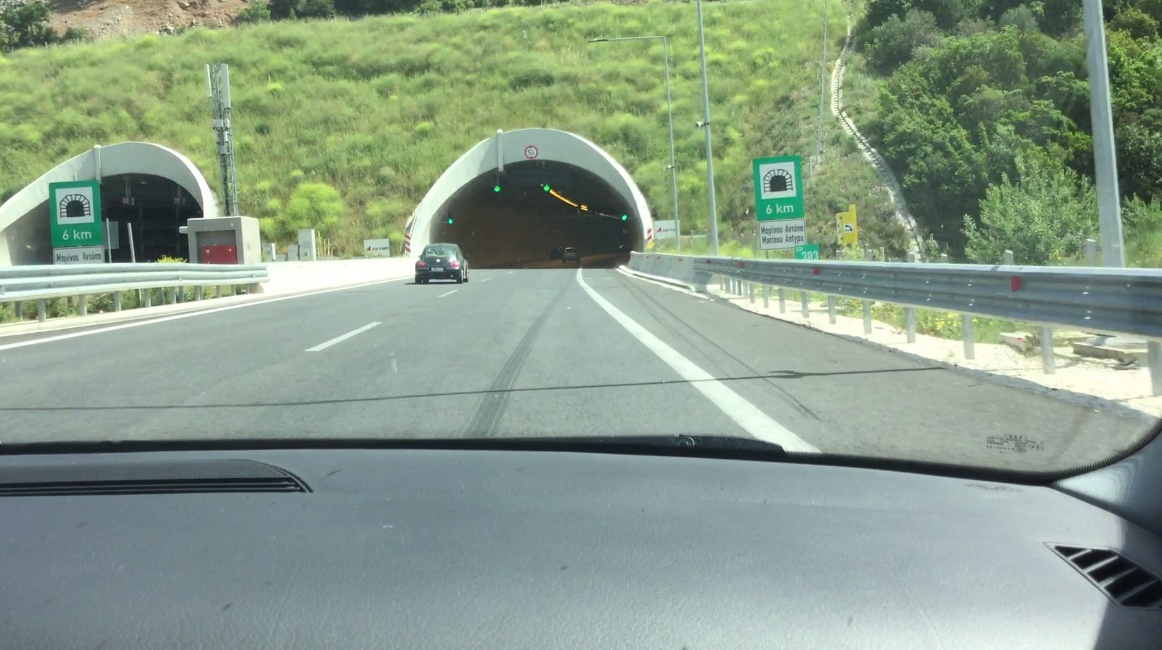
The current T2 Tempi Tunnel, which did not exist in 2003.

In April 2017, the Tempi tunnel was opened, bypassing the old Athens-Thessaloniki national road.

At the site of the accident, a marble monument bears the photographs of the 21 fatalities with the inscription "April 13, 2003" and has a flower on top. Below the monument is the text "At this point, under the responsibility of the State and on the altar of profit, the 21 students of the 1st Grade of the Lyceum of Makrochori, Imathia, were sacrificed".

Another plaque nearby bears the names of the students with the inscription "They left on April 13, 2003". A Trisagion is held there every 13 April.

Since 2016, the annual "Running of 21 Students" race has been held in Makrochori. Participants are given commemorative medals and prizes, and one of the village squares was renamed "Square of 21 Students".

In 2010, the Municipal Library of Makrochori was inaugurated, which is dedicated to the memory of those killed.

In 2022, one of the survivors, who had suffered with psychological trauma since the incident, died by suicide.
