= Hasan Baba Tekke =

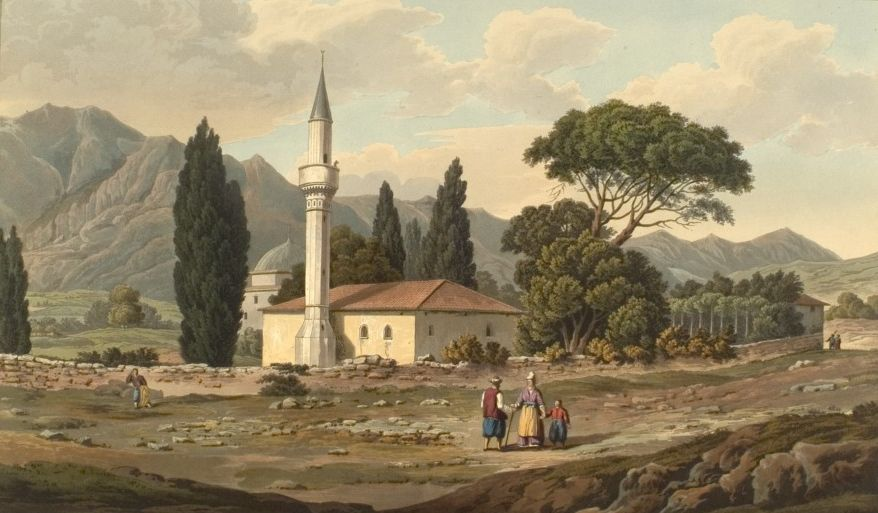
- View of the complex from Edward Dodwell's Views in Greece (1821), showing the now vanished mosque, with the dome of the türbe in the background

- Location within Greece

Religion
- Affiliation: Islam
- Region: Thessaly

Location
- Municipality: Larissa
- Country: Greece
- Interactive map of Hasan Baba Tekke
- Coordinates: 39°51′37.0″N 22°31′52.3″E

Architecture
- Style: Ottoman architecture

The Hasan Baba Tekke (Greek: Τεκές Χασάν Μπαμπά) is a former tekke (a house for the gathering of dervishes) in the Vale of Tempe, Greece. The tekke is a large complex, now largely ruined, near the village of Tempi, on the banks of the Pineios River. In Byzantine times, the settlement of Lykostomion occupied the site, but the modern settlement grew up around the tekke, and until the 20th century was named Baba after the founder of the tekke, Hasan Baba.

== History ==
Following his death, Hasan Baba became known as a miracle-worker, and the tekke became a site of pilgrimage for faithful from all over the Ottoman Empire, particularly by women who wanted to conceive, and children that could not walk. A large monastic complex of the Bektashi order grew around the türbe (mausoleum) of its founder, including a square mosque with a minaret, quarters for the dervishes and pilgrims, and large kitchens.

Since 1987, the türbe is under the purview of the 7th Ephorate of Byzantine Antiquities, and plans for a full-scale restoration of the monument were laid down in 2009. Limited restoration work has been undertaken to support the structure, but it is not open to the public.

== Architecture ==
The main surviving structure is the türbe, a square structure with sides 5.9 m long and 9 m high. It is roofed with a brick dome, supported by an octagonal drum and covered with leaden sheets. It originally featured a porch covered in three small domes, but it collapsed in 1930, after the marble capitals of its columns were removed. The interior was originally covered in plaster, decorated with inscriptions from the Quran, which are partly preserved, and floral patterns in white on black background. The türbe is dated to the late 14th or early 15th centuries, while a square annex on its eastern side dates to the late 17th century. The building of the kitchens also survives, while most of the surrounding area has been given over to the village of Tempi for its cemetery, or has been converted to fields. The ruins of the mosque, whose appearance is known from the depiction of Edward Dodwell, are to the northwest of the türbe.
