= Achinos =

Achinos (Greek: Αχινός) may refer to:

- Achinos, Phthiotis — a village and community in Central Greece
- Achinos, Serres — a village and a former municipality in Central Macedonia
