= Deipnias =

Town in ancient Thessaly near Larissa, Greece

Deipnias (Ancient Greek: Δειπνιάς) was a town in ancient Thessaly near Larissa. It is noted in Greek mythology as the place where Apollo broke his fast after he returned laurate from the Vale of Tempe.

Its site has not been located.
