= T2 Tunnel (Greece) =

Road tunnel in Greece

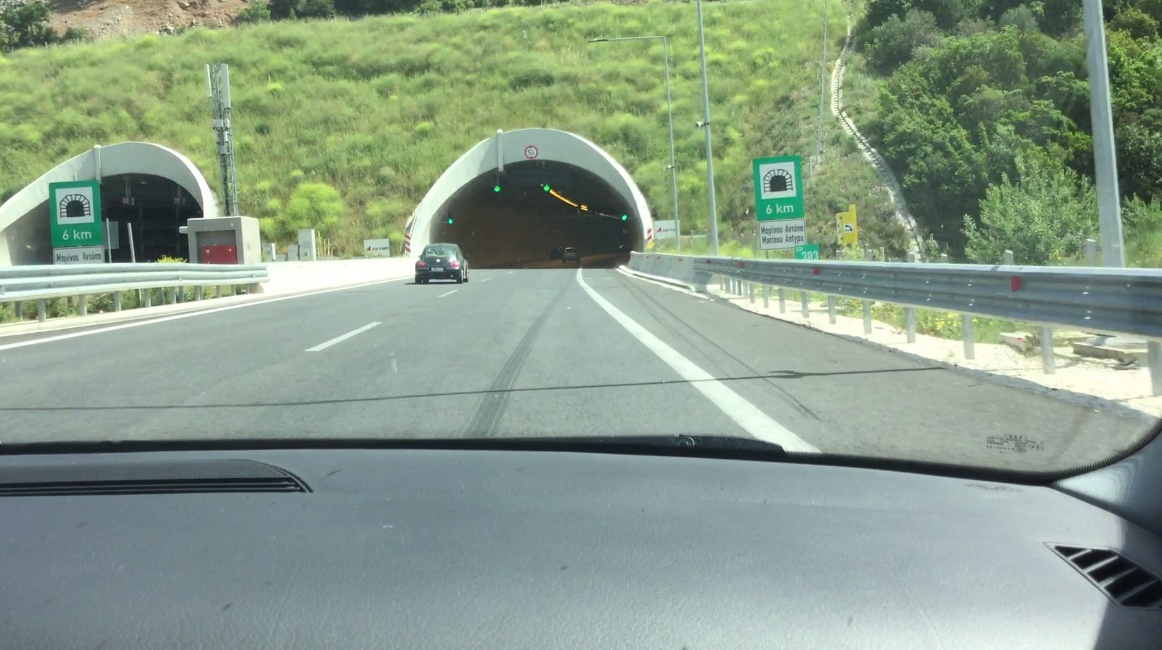
- Interactive map of T2 Tunnel

Overview
- Official name: Marinos Antypas–Rigas Feraios Tunnel
- Location: Larissa, Greece
- Coordinates: 39°52′08.3″N 22°32′57.4″E
- Status: Operational

Operation
- Work began: 2008
- Opened: 6 April 2017
- Operator: Aftokinitodromos Aigaiou S.A.
- Traffic: automotive
- Character: Twin-tube motorway tunnel

Technical
- Length: 6,000 m (20,000 ft)
- No. of lanes: 2x2

The T2 Tunnel (Greek: Σήραγγα Τ2), officially Marinos Antypas–Rigas Feraios Tunnel (Greek: Σήραγγα Μαρίνου Αντύπα–Ρήγα Φεραίου) is a 6-kilometre (3.7 mi) highway twin tunnel on the A1 motorway in Greece. It is the longest road tunnel in South-east Europe. It was built for the motorway to bypass the Vale of Tempe, which was traversed by the very narrow and dangerous Greek National Road 1.

Construction of the T2 Tunnel began in August 2008, along with a 25-kilometre (16 mi) section of the motorway, but both projects were slowed in 2010–11 by the country's economic crisis. Construction resumed in 2014 and was completed in April 2017, along with the Evangelismos-Skotina section of the motorway.

== See also ==
- A1 motorway (Greece)
