= Dafnousia =

Dafnousia Δαφνούσια
- Municipal unit
- Location within the regional unit

- Location within Greece
- Coordinates: 38°43′N 23°03′E
- Country: Greece
- Administrative region: Central Greece
- Regional unit: Phthiotis
- Municipality: Lokroi

Area
  - Municipal unit: 77.37 km^{2} (29.87 sq mi)

Population (2021)
  - Municipal unit: 3,387
  - Municipal unit density: 43.78/km^{2} (113.4/sq mi)
- Time zone: UTC+2 (EET)
  - Summer (DST): UTC+3 (EEST)
- Vehicle registration: ΜΙ

Dafnousia (Greek: Δαφνούσια) is a former municipality in Phthiotis, Greece. Since the 2011 local government reform it is part of the municipality Lokroi, of which it is a municipal unit. The municipal unit has an area of 77.374 km^{2}. In 2021 its population was 3,387. The seat of the municipality was in Livanates where three quarters of the population live. Dafnousia borders on the municipal unit of Atalanti to the south, and Agios Konstantinos to the west. The name of the municipality comes from the ancient city of "Dafnous" or "Dafnountas" (probably today's Agios Konstantinos village).

== Subdivisions ==
The municipal unit Dafnousia is subdivided into the following communities (constituent villages in brackets):

- Arkitsa (Arkitsa, Agia Aikaterini, Agios Nikolaos, Kalypso, Melidoni)
- Goulemi
- Livanates
