= Plaka, Pieria =

Plaka Πλάκα
- Settlement
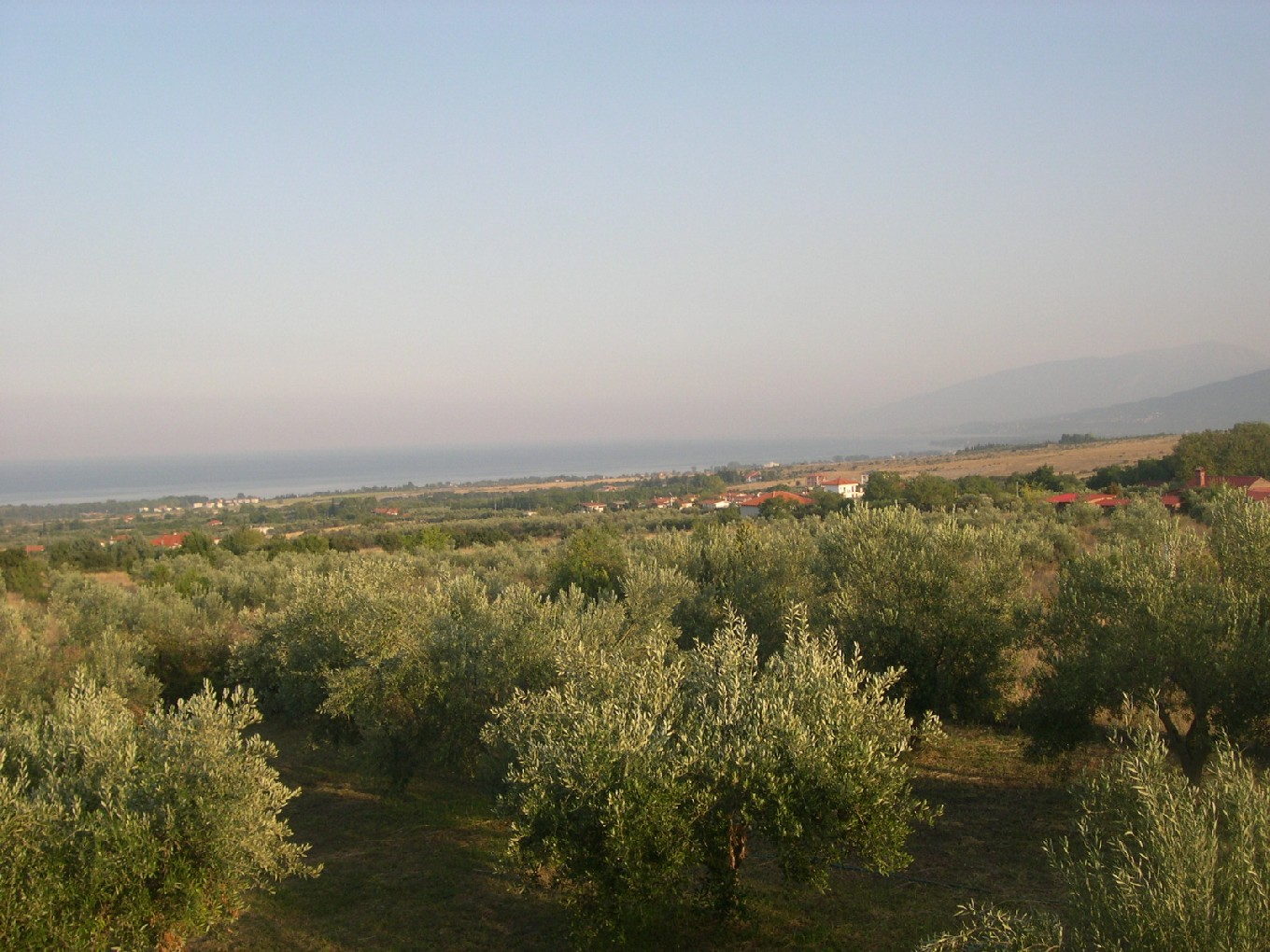

- Location within Greece
- Coordinates: 40°6′N 22°33.769′E
- Country: Greece
- Administrative region: Central Macedonia
- Regional unit: Pieria
- Municipality: Dio-Olympos
- Municipal unit: Litochoro
- Community: Litochoro
- Elevation: 10 m (33 ft)

Population (2021)
  - Total: 194
- Time zone: UTC+2 (EET)
  - Summer (DST): UTC+3 (EEST)
- Postal code: 602 00
- Area code: +30-2352
- Vehicle registration: KN

Plaka (Greek: Πλάκα) is a settlement of the Dio-Olympos municipality. Before the 2011 local government reform it was part of the municipality of Litochoro. The 2021 census recorded 194 inhabitants in the village. Plaka is a part of the community of Litochoro.

== See also ==
- List of settlements in the Pieria regional unit
