= Vale of Tempe =

Gorge in northern Thessaly, Greece

Vale of Tempe Κοιλάδα των Τεμπών
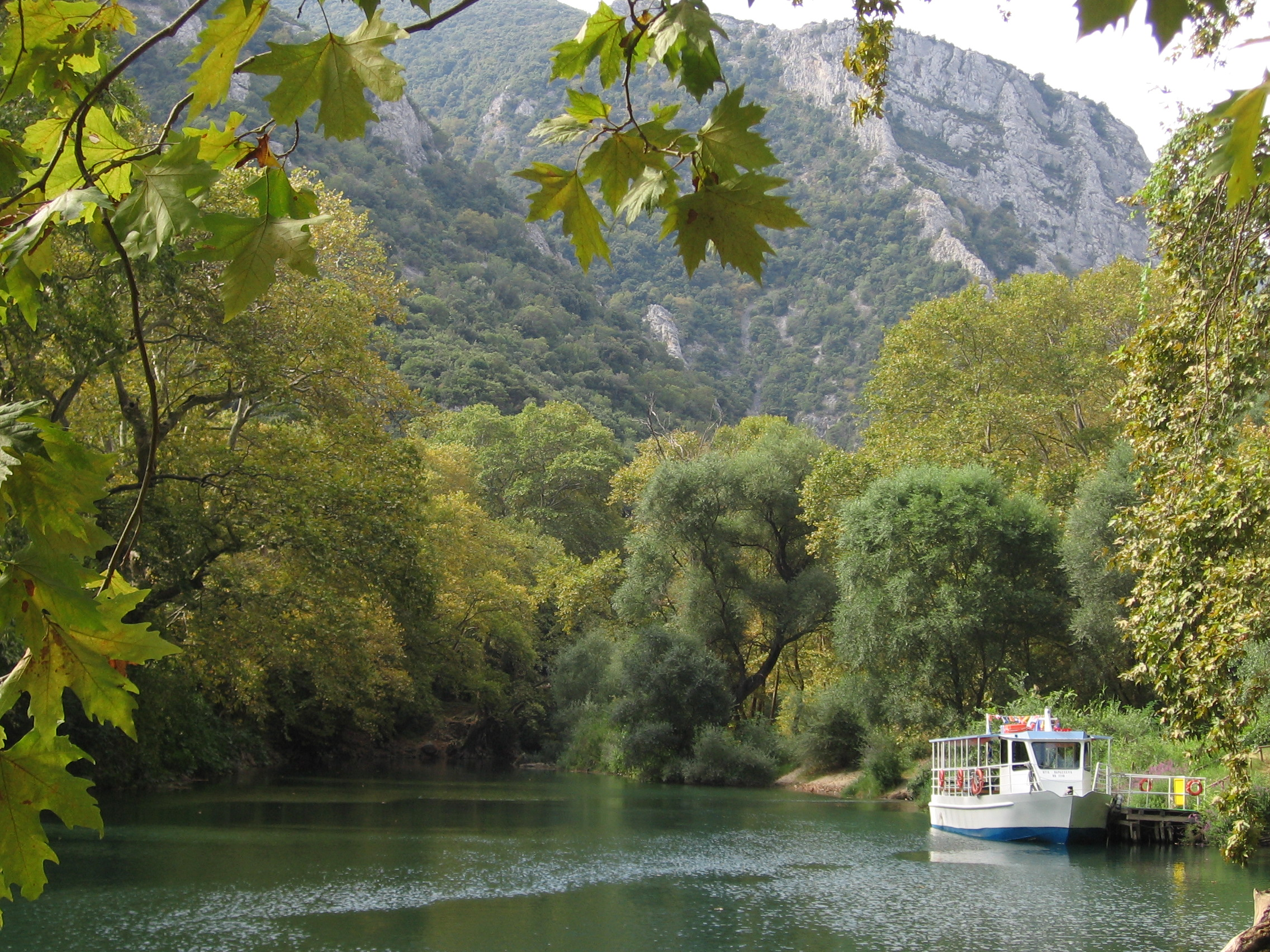
- View of the Pineios River gorge.

- Location within Greece
- Floor elevation: approx. 267 metres (876 ft)
- Length: 12.4 kilometres (7.7 mi)
- Width: 0.7 to 1.5 kilometres (0.43 to 0.93 mi)

Geography
- Location: Thessaly, Greece
- Coordinates: 39°52′37″N 22°33′58″E
- Rivers: Pineios River
- Interactive map of Vale of Tempe; Κοιλάδα των Τεμπών

The Vale of Tempe or Tembi (/ˈtɛmpi/; Greek: Τέμπη, Κοιλάδα των Τεμπών; Ancient Greek: Τέμπεα, Τέμπη) is a gorge in the Tempi municipality of northern Thessaly, Greece, located between Olympus to the north and Ossa to the south, and between the regions of Thessaly and Macedonia.

In the Greek municipality of Tempi, the valley is ten kilometers long and as narrow as 25 metres in places, with cliffs nearly 500 metres high. Through it flows the Pineios River on its way to the Aegean Sea. Historically the gorge has provided a strategic route through the mountains and its impressive rugged beauty is poetically renowned.

== Local history and legend ==
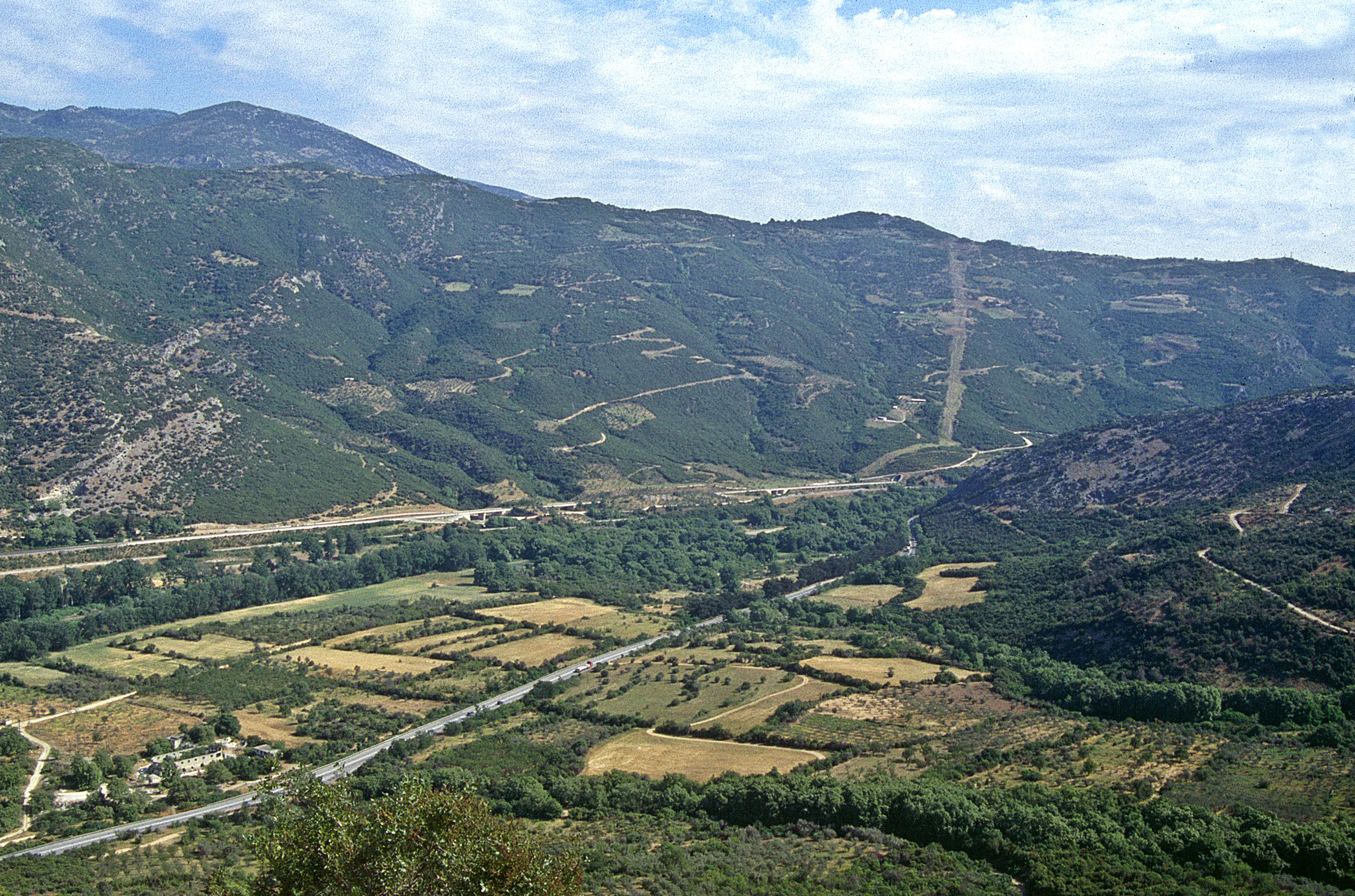
The vale

In legend, the Vale of Tempe was cut through the rocks by the trident of Poseidon. It was home for a time to Aristaeus, son of Apollo and Cyrene, and it was here that he chased Eurydice, wife of Orpheus, who, in her flight, was bitten by a serpent and died. In ancient times, it was celebrated by Greek poets as a favorite haunt of Apollo and the Muses. On the right bank of the Pineios sat a temple to Apollo, near which the laurels used to crown the victorious in the Pythian Games were gathered.

Two places of pilgrimage developed later in the area. At the southern entrance of the valley lie the remains of the Ottoman-era Hasan Baba Tekke, a 14-15th century mosque built about the tomb of a dervish saint. Traditionally it was visited particularly by women who wanted to conceive and children that could not walk. Within the gorge itself is the ancient cave shrine and holy spring of the Christian saint, Aghia Paraskevi, protector of the eyes and of gypsies. It is approached by a narrow footbridge over the river and sheltered by a chapel built about 1910.

The Tempe Pass is a strategic point in Greece since it is the main route from Larissa through the mountains to the coast. Though it can be bypassed via the Sarantoporo Pass, the alternative route takes longer. Because of this, it has been the scene of numerous battles throughout history. In 480 BC, 10,000 Athenians and Spartans gathered at Tempe to stop Xerxes's invasion. However, once there, they were warned by Alexander I of Macedon that the vale could be bypassed and that the army of Xerxes was overwhelmingly large; accordingly, the Greeks retreated.

During the Third Macedonian War in 169 BC, the Romans broke through Perseus of Macedon's defences here and later defeated him in the Battle of Pydna. During the revolution of Andriskos in 148 BC the valley was the site of another conflict. Then, following some centuries of Roman peace, the pass was penetrated again during the first Gothic War (376–382) when, in the words of the poet Claudian, "Thessaly grieved because the Vale of Tempe was no help, while the Goths laughed at Mount Oeta's conquered crags". Other battles were fought there too during Byzantine and Ottoman times. The gorge was known to the Byzantines as Λυκόστομο (Wolf's Throat) and was called simply Boğaz (Gorge) by the Turks.

== Communications ==
Until recently the road through the gorge followed the track of the ancient military road made by the Romans, running along the right bank of the river. By the time of the Battle of Tempe Gorge in 1941, it had hardly improved and later, as the Greek National Road 1, had still the reputation of being narrow and dangerous, with one particular road accident causing the deaths of 21 schoolchildren in April 2003. Only with the opening of the A1 motorway and its bypassing tunnels in 2017 was there a change for the better. Also running through the gorge is the Athens–Thessaloniki mainline. Originally built as single-tracked in the 1910s, it was closed on 27 November 2003 and the following day trains were routed through the new double-tracked line, featuring two long tunnels that allow speeds of up to 160 km/h. Nevertheless, it was the scene of what was reported as Greece's deadliest rail disaster on 28 February 2023.

== Ideal scenes ==
The Classical idealisation of the Vale of Tempe continued to inform the European imagination over two millennia. In his illustrated atlas, Theatrum Orbis Terrarum (1590), Abraham Ortelius pictured the gorge as "The Paradise of Tempe at the foot of Mount Olympus", inhabited by a pious and happy people. Much the same impression of the location is given in The Pleasures of the Imagination (1744) by Mark Akenside, which is derivative of many prior poetical descriptions:

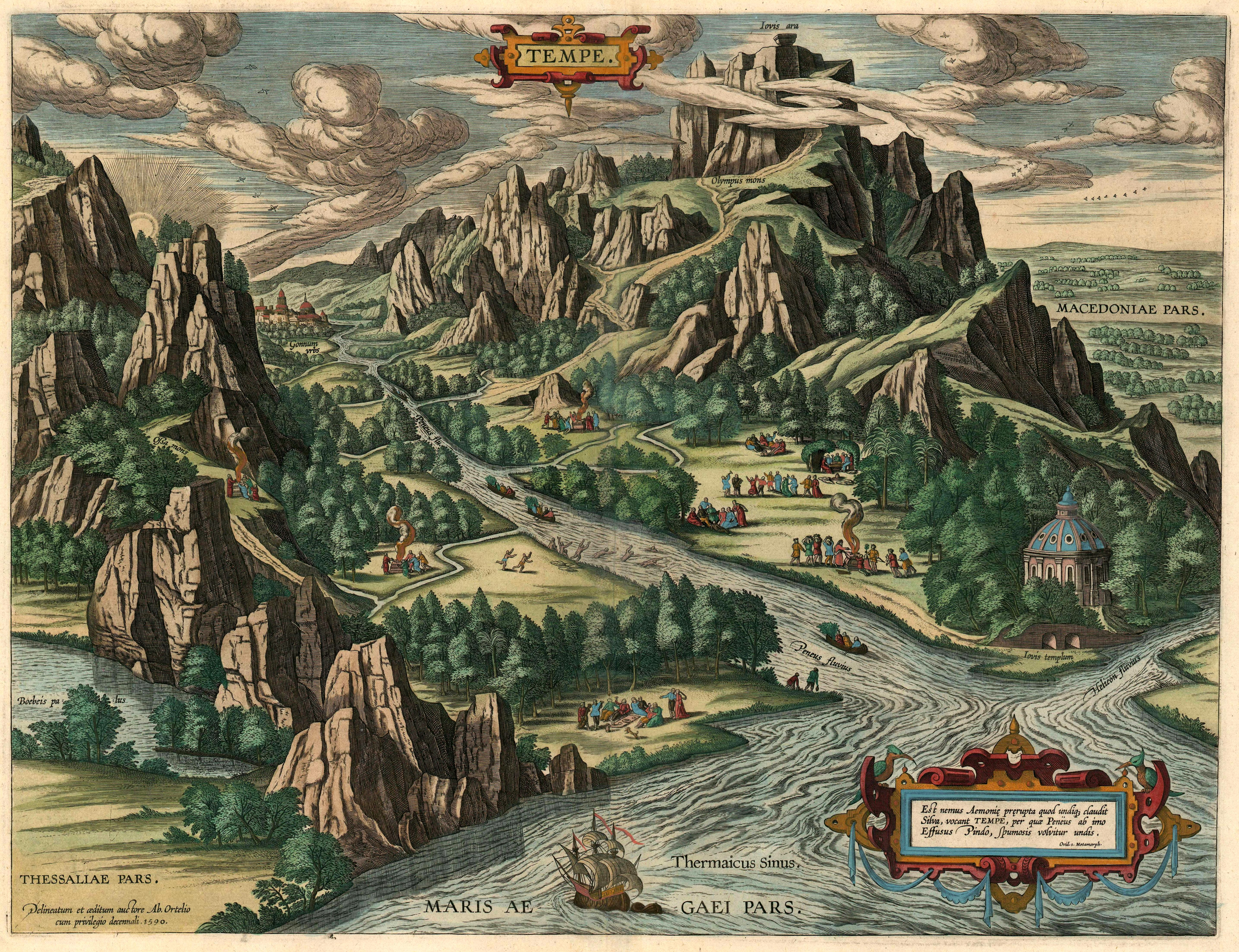
View of The Paradise of Tempe by Abraham Oretellius, 1590

Fair Tempe! haunt belov'd of sylvan powers,
Of nymphs and fauns; where in the golden age
They play'd in secret on the shady brink
With ancient Pan: while round their choral steps,
Young hours and genial gales with constant hand
Shower'd blossoms, odours; shower'd ambrosial dews,
And spring’s elysian bloom.

The English romantic poet John Keats cites in his famed 1819 work Ode on a Grecian Urn, writing .."deities or mortals, or of both, In Tempe or the dales of Arcady? What men or gods are these? What maidens loth?...."

Painters of the 19th century also contributed to this mythologising tradition. They include J. M. W. Turner, whose The story of Apollo and Daphne (1837) is based on Ovid's account in the Metamorphoses. In his painting, the broad valley is rimmed by mountains and dissolves in light, while the characters meeting on the road are dwarfed by the scene that opens behind them. Francis Danby's The Contest of the Lyre and the Pipe in the Valley of Tempe (1842) pictures a similar scene, as it is described in a contemporary publication. Behind the competing musicians in the foreground, "the sun is setting over Ossa, and the river Peneus, steeped in its departing light, is flowing below".

The convention of the valley's pleasant nature has also been used to underline the discomfiture of Pompey's flight after his defeat at the Battle of Pharsalus, as recounted by Plutarch. A later historian embroidered on his bare statement of fact with the reflection that "Pompey passed on through the Vale of Tempe to the sea, regardless of the beauty and splendour that surrounded him". He was, however, doing no more than poets before. John Edmund Reade, for example, whose long narrative in "The Vale of Tempe" records the fugitive's desperate appearance as glimpsed by a bystander; and William Dale of Newlyn, whose "Pompey in the Vale of Tempe" calls on the "delightful valley" to mourn the misfortune of the vanquished leader.

In reality, William Smith sets such accounts straight in his Dictionary of Greek and Roman Geography (1854), commenting that the vale's "scenery is distinguished rather by savage grandeur than by the sylvan beauty which [some authors] attribute to it…None of these writers appear to have drawn their pictures from actual observation". In corroboration he cites Edward Dodwell's account of A Classical and Topographical Tour through Greece (1819) and the accompanying engravings based on the drawings he made on his journey. In the course of his passage through the gorge, Dodwell notes, "the traveller beholds on either side a stupendous wall of mighty precipices rising in prodigious grandeur, shattered into deformities and sprinkled with a wild profusion of trees and aromatic shrubs."
