= Livanates =

- Community
- Location within Greece
- Coordinates: 38°43′N 23°03′E
- Country: Greece
- Administrative region: Central Greece
- Regional unit: Phthiotis
- Municipality: Lokroi
- Municipal unit: Dafnousia
- Elevation: 5 m (16 ft)

Population (2021)
  - Community: 2,333
- Time zone: UTC+2 (EET)
  - Summer (DST): UTC+3 (EEST)
- Vehicle registration: ΜΙ

Livanates (Greek: Λιβανάτες) is a seaside town in Phthiotis, central Greece. It is located 68 km southeast of Lamia and it was the seat of the municipality of Dafnousia between 1997 and 2011. Its population in 2021 was 2,333.

== History ==
Kynos, an ancient settlement site, can be found at the edge of the town. The medieval settlement was established by Albanians. Livanates has been attested since 1540 as an Albanian settlement. The Arvanitic dialect spoken in Livanates has some unique features that differentiate it from the other Arvanitic dialects.

Livanates had 1,021 people in the 1890s. In April 1894, a strong earthquake ravaged the town, killed 5 residents and injured 20 more.

During the occupation in World War II, Canada saved many Athenians from starvation by donating wheat, potatoes, chick peas and cottons, as well as vegetables. During that period, Kynos hill was used for its military base as a camp and a prison.

== Economy ==
The region produces meat, fish, potatoes, tomatoes, olives and olive oil, tobacco and cotton.

== Landmarks ==
Notable sites are the Church of Agioi Theodoroi, a small Byzantine church which is an alleged site of krifo scholio, and the Monastery of the Transfiguration.

Livanates has three beaches, 'Kyani Akti' (Blue Coast),'Skinia' and 'Ai-Giannis'. Kyani Akti is the main beach and is located 1-1.5 km from the main square.

== Other ==
The Livanates Odysseas Androutsos Cultural Council was formed in 1979 and is named after the famous hero of the Greek Revolution of 1821. Livanates also has a women's council known as I Pyrrha and a football (soccer) club known as Dafni (prefectural (subregional) winner in 2002 and 2005 and cup winner in 2004).

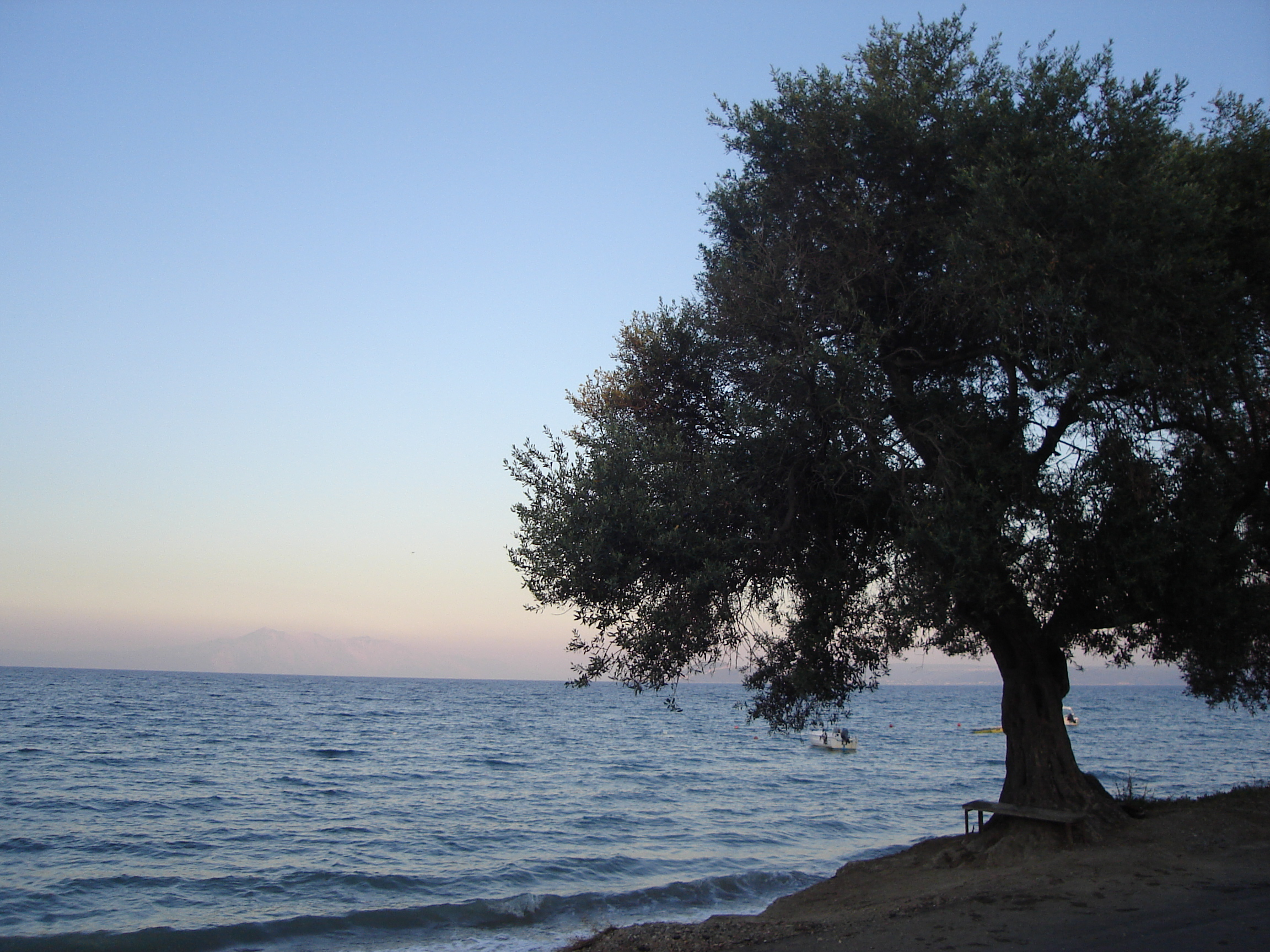
Livanates, view of the coast overlooking Euboea

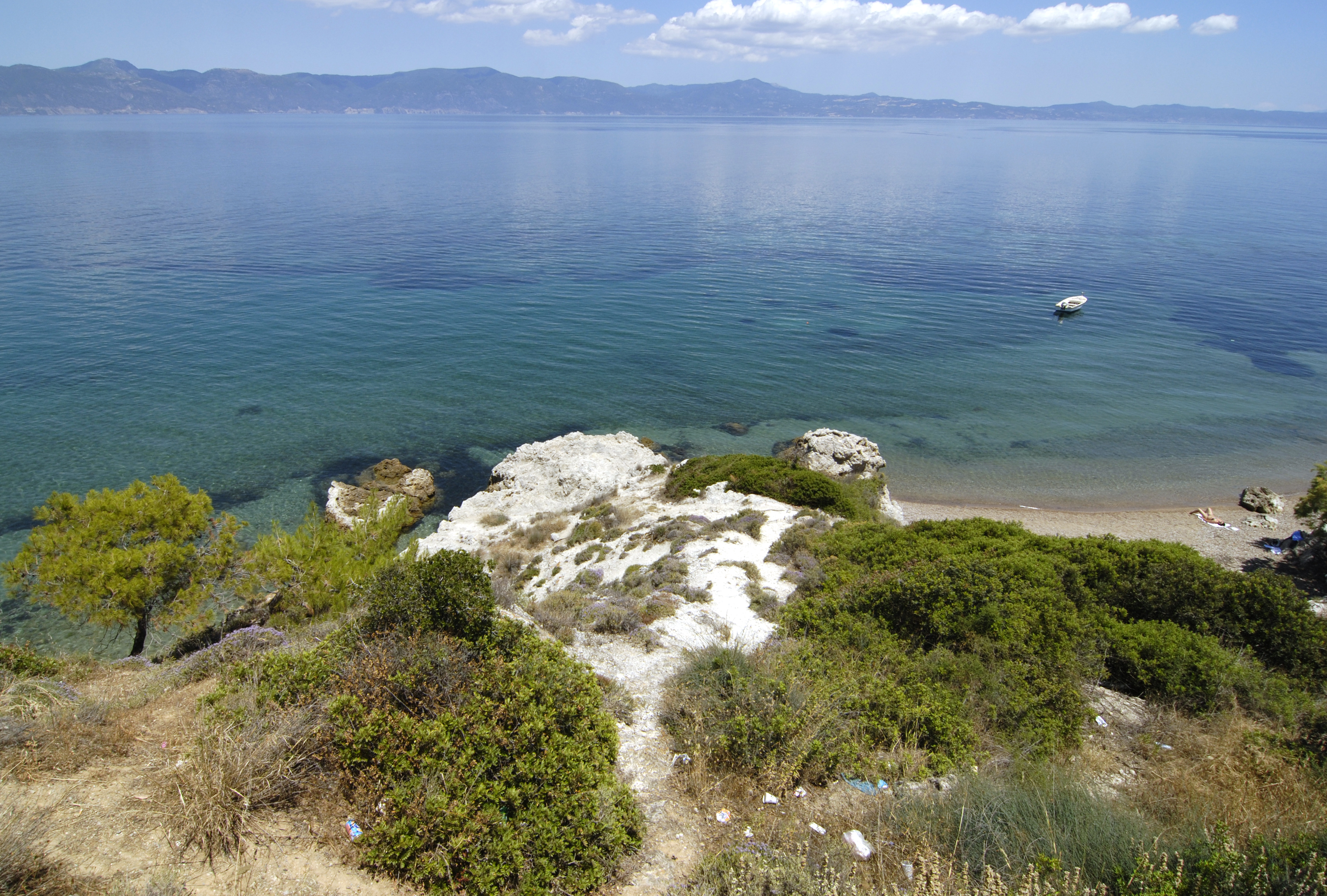
Livanates, view by the Ai Giannis church, near Kynos.
