= Kallithea, Pieria =

Kallithea Καλλιθέα
- Community
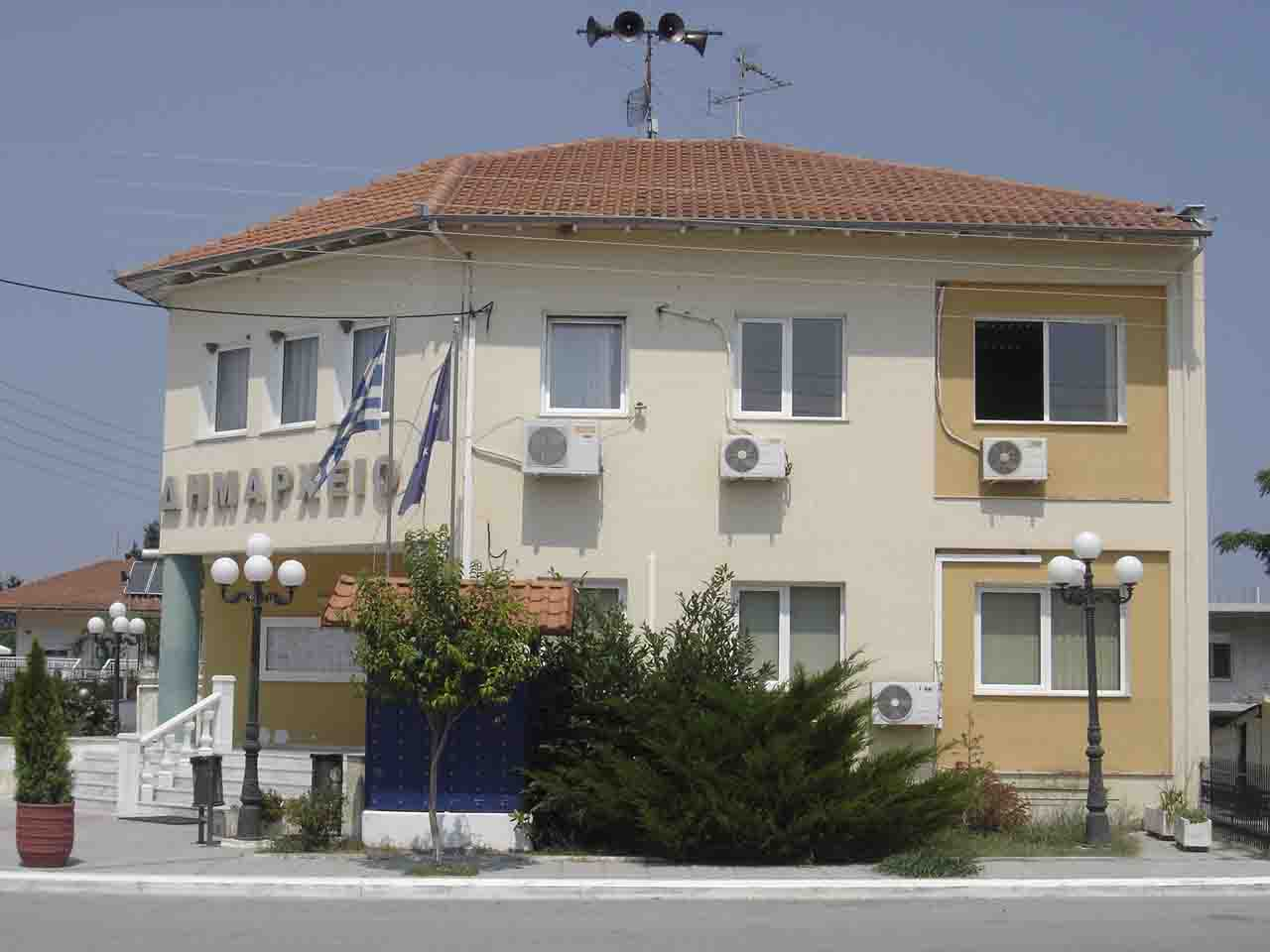
- The town hall of the former municipality of Paralia

- Location within Greece
- Coordinates: 40°16.5′N 22°34.5′E
- Country: Greece
- Administrative region: Central Macedonia
- Regional unit: Pieria
- Municipality: Katerini
- Municipal unit: Paralia
- Lowest elevation: 10 m (33 ft)

Population (2021)
  - Community: 2,933
- Time zone: UTC+2 (EET)
  - Summer (DST): UTC+3 (EEST)
- Postal code: 601 00
- Area code: 23510
- Vehicle registration: KN

Kallithea (Greek: Καλλιθέα) is a village and a community of the Katerini municipality. Before the 2011 local government reform it was a municipal district and the seat of the municipality of Paralia. The 2021 census recorded 2,933 inhabitants in the village.
