= Kamena Vourla =

Kamena Vourla Καμένα Βούρλα
- Municipality
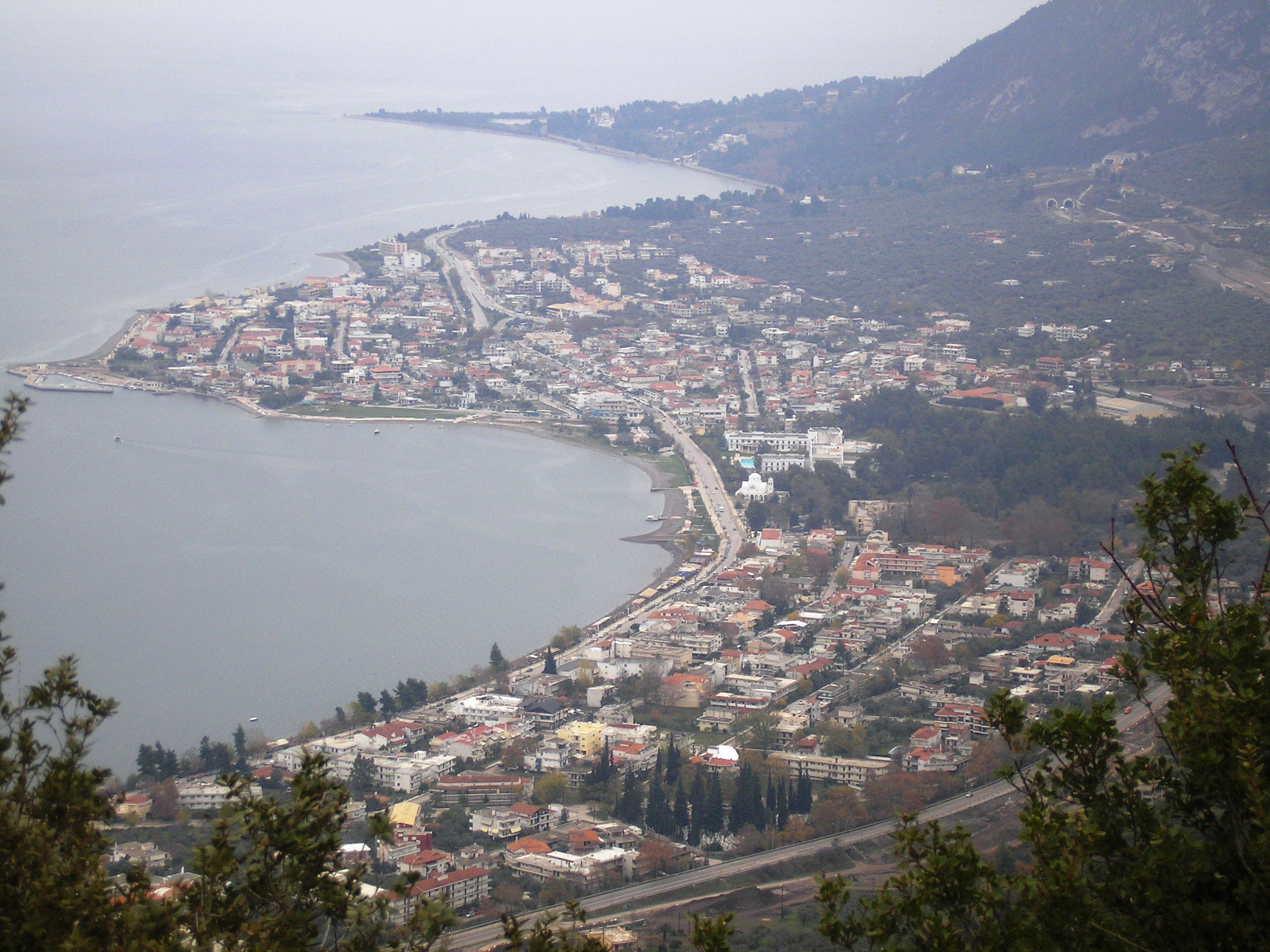

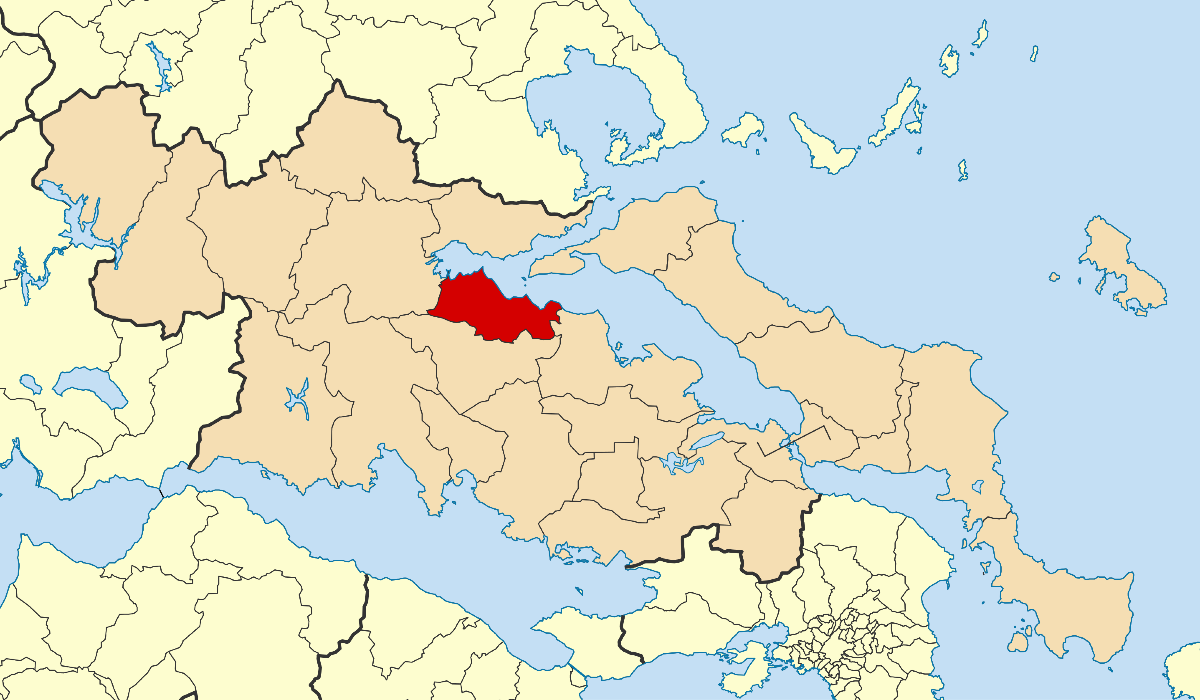
- Location within the region

- Location within Greece
- Coordinates: 38°47′N 22°47′E
- Country: Greece
- Administrative region: Central Greece
- Regional unit: Phthiotis

Area
  - Municipality: 339.0 km^{2} (130.9 sq mi)
  - Municipal unit: 117.9 km^{2} (45.5 sq mi)

Population (2021)
  - Municipality: 10,924
  - Density: 32.22/km^{2} (83.46/sq mi)
  - Municipal unit: 4,361
  - Municipal unit density: 36.99/km^{2} (95.80/sq mi)
  - Community: 2,732
- Time zone: UTC+2 (EET)
  - Summer (DST): UTC+3 (EEST)
- Postal code: 35008
- Vehicle registration: ΜΙ
- Website: www.dimos-kamenon-vourlon.gr

Kamena Vourla (Greek: Καμένα Βούρλα, lit. 'Burnt Rushes', Modern Greek pronunciation: [kaˈme̞.na ˈvur.la]) is a town and a municipality in Phthiotis, Greece. At the 2011 local government reform it became part of the municipality Molos-Agios Konstantinos (of which it became the seat), which was renamed to Kamena Vourla in July 2018. The population of the town proper was 2,796 at the 2011 census.

== Geography ==
Kamena Vourla is located on the south coast of the Malian Gulf, 4 km (2 mi) west of Cape Knimis, which separates the Malian Gulf from the North Euboean Gulf. The Knimis mountains rise just south of the town. It is crossed by the A1 motorway, which connects Athens and Thessaloniki.

The municipality Kamena Vourla comprises the municipal units Kamena Vourla, Agios Konstantinos and Molos. The municipal unit Kamena Vourla consists of the communities Kamena Vourla, Kainourgio and Regkinio. The municipality has an area of 339.0 km^{2}, the municipal unit Kamena Vourla (the pre-2011 municipality) has an area of 117.9 km^{2}.

== Population ==
The population of the municipality Kamena Vourla was 10,924 in 2011, of which 4,361 in the municipal unit Kamena Vourla and 2,732 in the town proper.

== Springs and monastery ==
The famous springs became important around 1926 when the chemist Michail Pertesis discovered the exceptionally high radon concentration in the water, which was thought of as a great value for people's health. Nearly ten years later (1930s), the first hotels started to develop. After World War II, Kamena Vourla was transformed into a tourist attraction.

Eight kilometers away on the road heading uphill features the monastery known as Iera Moni Metamorfoseos tou Sotiros which was built in around the 11th century. Nearby the city a historic tomb is situated, a monument to the Battle of Thermopylae with a seal of Leonidas, King of Sparta, located not far from the mountain village Karya.
