= Echinaioi =

Echinaioi Εχιναίοι
- Municipal unit
- Location within the regional unit

- Location within Greece
- Coordinates: 38°53′N 22°47′E
- Country: Greece
- Administrative region: Central Greece
- Regional unit: Phthiotis
- Municipality: Stylida

Area
  - Municipal unit: 133.1 km^{2} (51.4 sq mi)

Population (2021)
  - Municipal unit: 3,279
  - Municipal unit density: 24.64/km^{2} (63.81/sq mi)
- Time zone: UTC+2 (EET)
  - Summer (DST): UTC+3 (EEST)
- Vehicle registration: ΜΙ

Echinaioi (Greek: Εχιναίοι) is a former municipality in Phthiotis, Greece. Since the 2011 local government reform it is part of the municipality Stylida, of which it is a municipal unit. The municipal unit has an area of 133.052 km^{2}. Population 3,279 (2021). The seat of the municipality was in Raches. The name of the municipality derives from the inhabitants of the ancient city of "Echinos", today's Achinos village.
