= Phalara =

Coordinates: 38°54′46″N 22°36′26″E

Map showing ancient Thessaly. Phalara is shown to the centre bottom on the Malian Gulf.

Phalara (Ancient Greek: τὰ Φάλαρα) was a city in Malis in ancient Thessaly that functioned as the port of Lamia. It is located at the modern town of Stylida.
