= Achinos, Phthiotis =

Achinos Αχινός
- Community
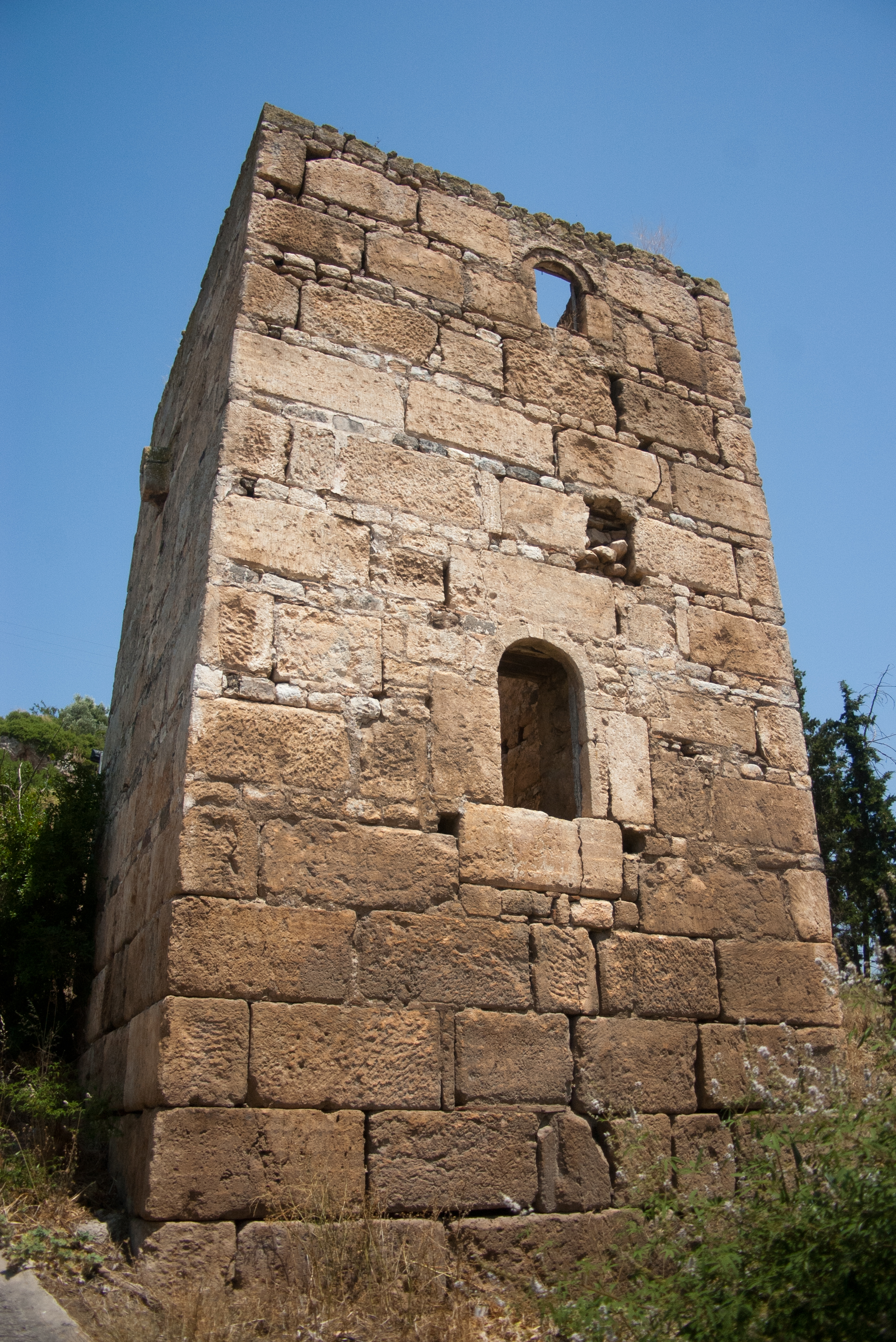
- The medieval tower of Achinos, built by reusing ancient material (spolia)

- Location within Greece
- Coordinates: 38°53′31″N 22°43′27″E
- Country: Greece
- Administrative region: Central Greece
- Regional unit: Phthiotis
- Municipality: Stylida
- Municipal unit: Echinaioi

Population (2021)
  - Community: 720
- Time zone: UTC+2 (EET)
  - Summer (DST): UTC+3 (EEST)
- Vehicle registration: ΕΡ

Achinos (Greek: Αχινός) is a village and community in the municipal unit of Echinaioi, municipality of Stylida, in Phthiotis, Central Greece. As of the 2021 census, the community had a population of 720.

The community has several villages other than Achinos:

- Drepano
- Drosia
- Kouvela
- Paralia Achinou
- Platanias
- Skasmada
