= Evzonoi =

Village in Central Macedonia, Greece

Evzonoi Εύζωνοι
- Community
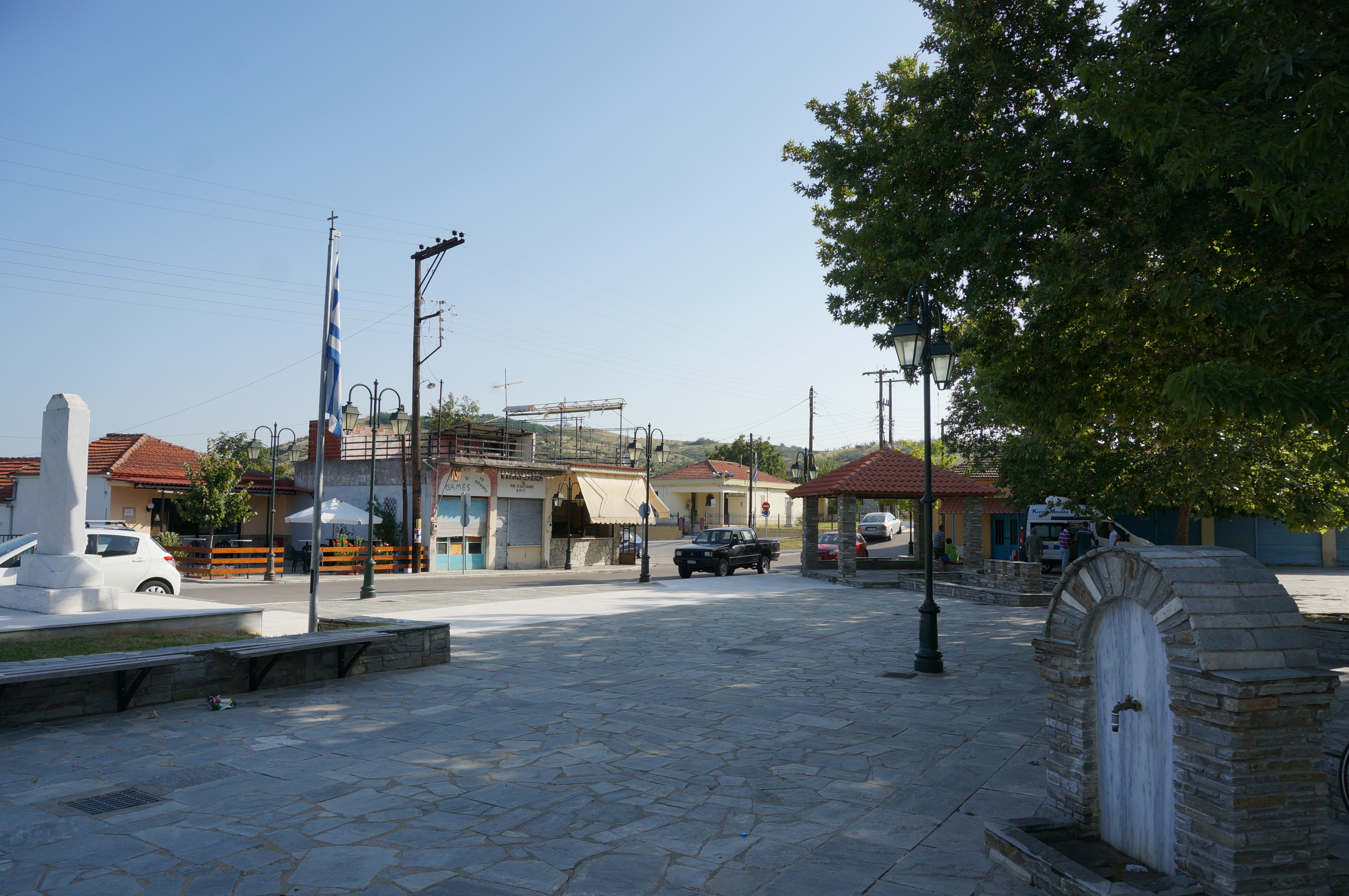
- The central square of Evzonoi

- Location within Greece
- Coordinates: 41°6′N 22°33′E
- Country: Greece
- Administrative region: Central Macedonia
- Regional unit: Kilkis
- Municipality: Paionia
- Municipal unit: Polykastro

Population (2021)
  - Community: 765
- Time zone: UTC+2 (EET)
  - Summer (DST): UTC+3 (EEST)

Evzonoi (Greek: Εύζωνοι, pronounced [ˈevzoni], before 1927: Ματσίκοβο - Matsikovo, Greek pronunciation: [maˈt͡sikovo], Macedonian: Мачуково, Bulgarian: Мачуково, Machukovo) is a town in Kilkis regional unit in Central Macedonia, Greece. The main border crossing between Greece and North Macedonia is located here. The village across the border from Evzonoi is Bogorodica, in Gevgelija municipality. The Greek A1 motorway from Athens, which is part of the European route E75, ends here.

Between 13 and 14 September 1916, during the Salonika Campaign, the King's Liverpool Regiment and Lancashire Fusiliers stormed and took the village which was held by German forces. But the village was too exposed to the enemy's artillery fire, and the British were forced to retreat.

The area has been affected by the Syrian refugee crisis — at nearby Idomeni, where a railway line makes the border crossing, a refugee transit camp for refugees was set up in 2015. Upon the closure of the border, a large population began to build up, some of whom lived in tents at Evzoni's petrol station.

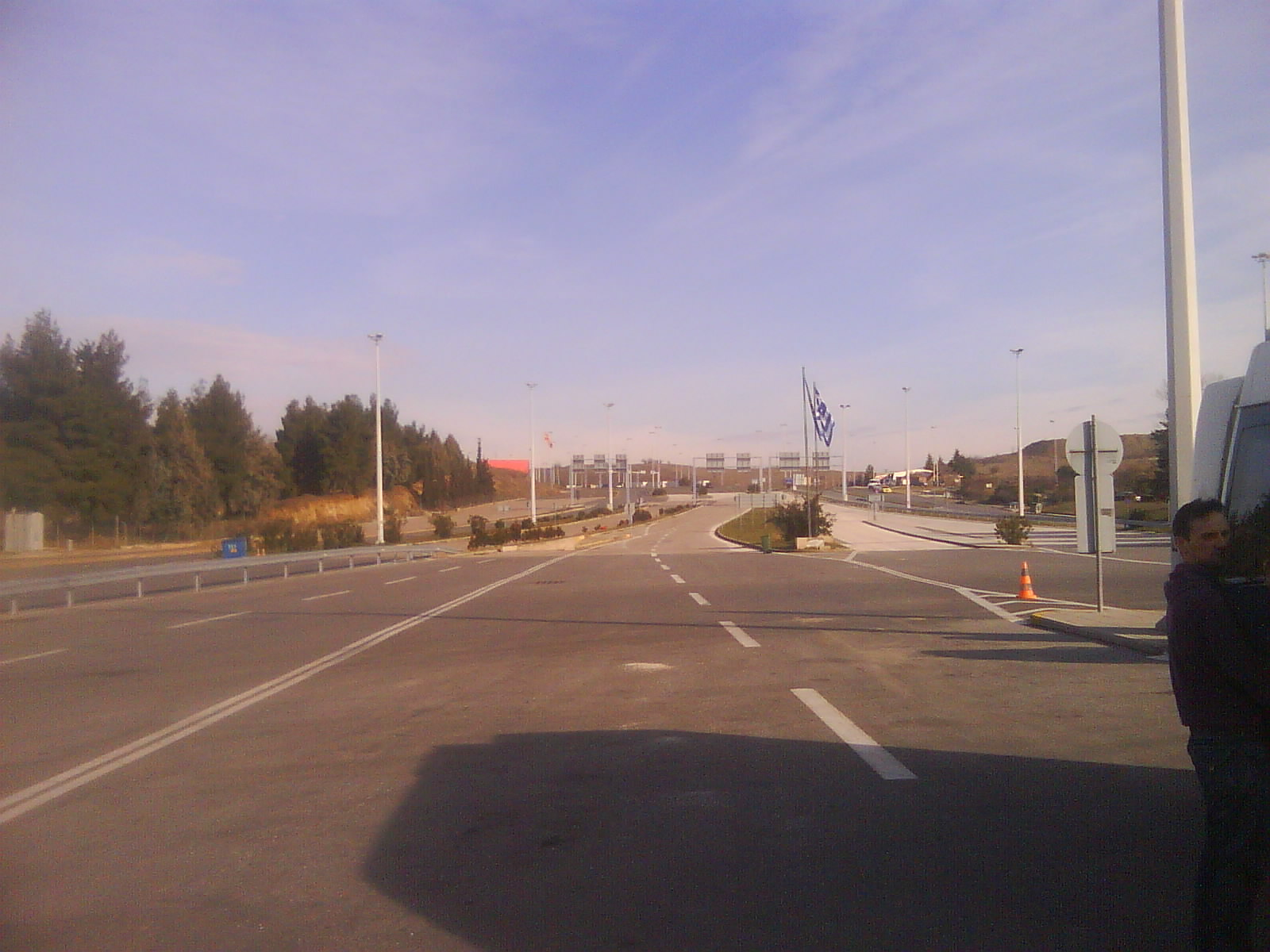
The border crossing to North Macedonia
