= Edward Dodwell =

Irish traveller, writer, and painter (1767–1832)

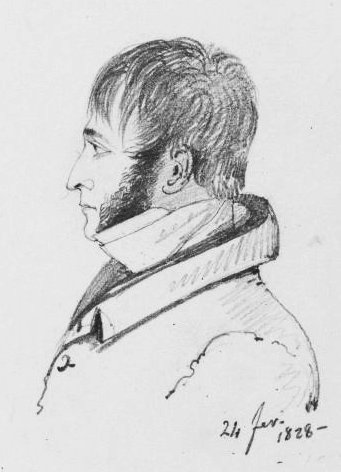
- 1828 drawing of Dodwell
- Born: 30 November 1767; Dublin, Ireland
- Died: 13 May 1832 (aged 65); Rome, Papal States
- Occupations: Writer, painter
- Spouse: Giraud
- Writing career
- Genre: travel literature
- Notable work: Views in Greece

Edward Dodwell (30 November 1767 – 13 May 1832) was an Irish painter, traveller and a writer on archaeology.

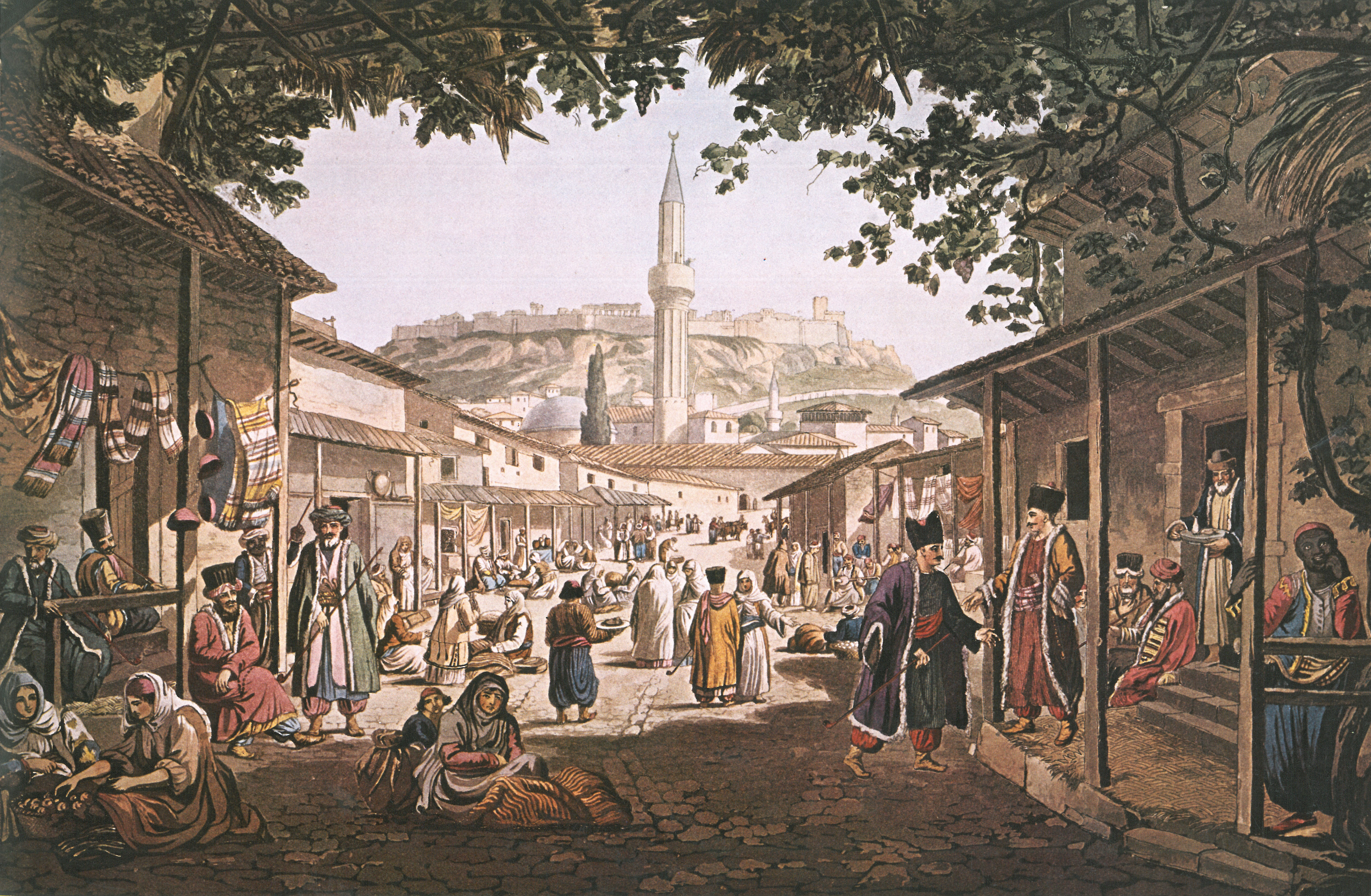
Painting of the bazaar at Athens, by Dodwell.

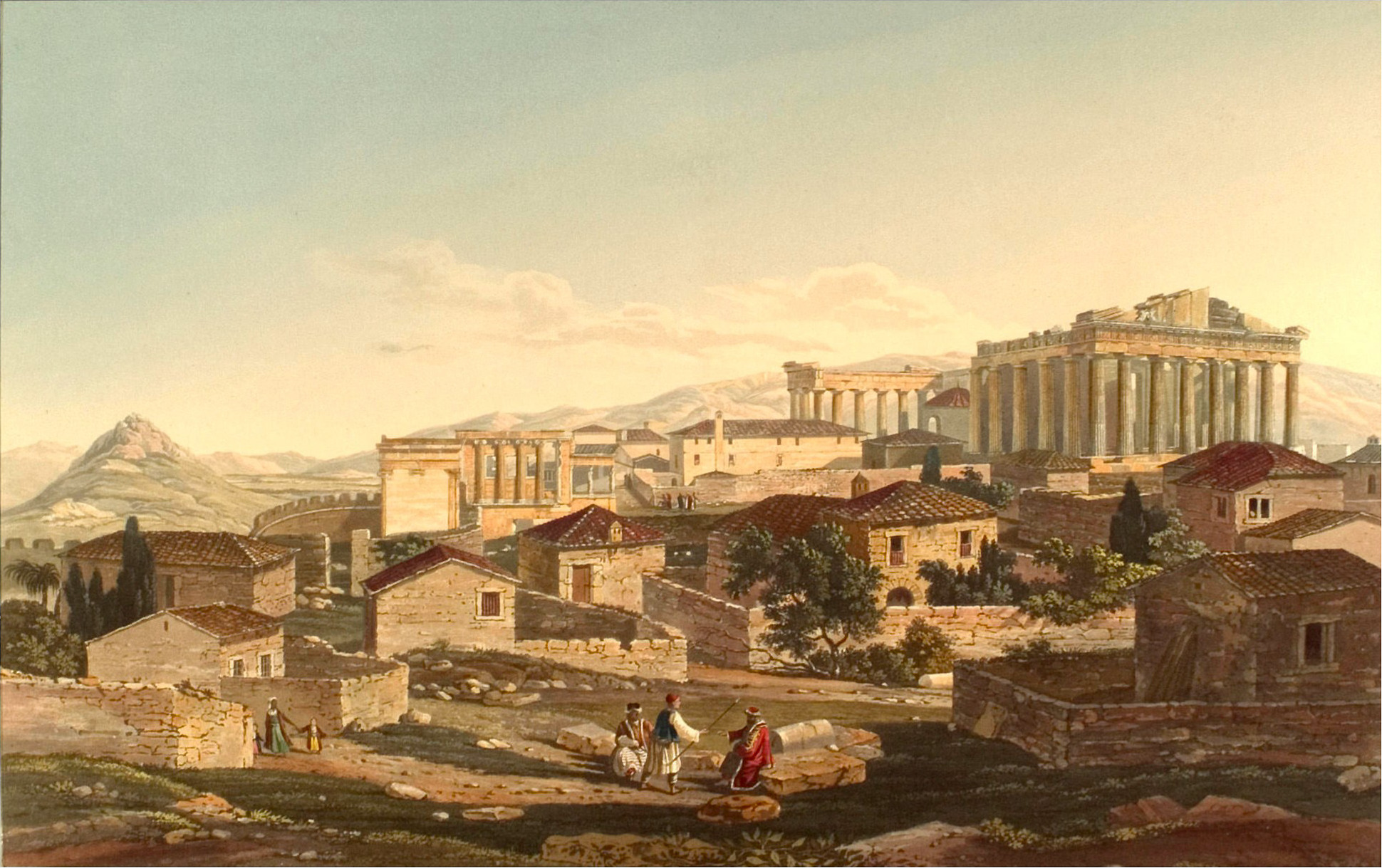
"West Front of the Parthenon", Views in Greece, London 1821

== Biography ==
Dodwell was born in Ireland and belonged to the same family as Henry Dodwell, the theologian. He was educated at Trinity College, Cambridge.

Dodwell travelled from 1801 to 1806 in Greece, which was then a part of the Ottoman Empire, and spent the rest of his life for the most part in Italy, at Naples and Rome. He died in Rome from the effects of an illness contracted in 1830 during a visit of exploration to the Sabine Mountains. Dodwell's widow, a daughter of Count Giraud and thirty years his junior, subsequently became famous as the "beautiful" countess of Spaur, and played a considerable role in the political life of the papal city.

Dodwell published A Classical and Topographical Tour through Greece (1819), of which a German translation appeared in 1821; Views in Greece, with thirty colored plates (1821); and Views and Descriptions of Cyclopian or Pelasgic Remains in Italy and Greece (London and Paris, with French text, 1834).
