= Agios Konstantinos, Phthiotis =

Agios Konstantinos Άγιος Κωνσταντίνος
- Municipal unit
- Location within the regional unit

- Location within Greece
- Coordinates: 38°45′N 22°52′E
- Country: Greece
- Administrative region: Central Greece
- Regional unit: Phthiotis
- Municipality: Kamena Vourla

Area
  - Municipal unit: 72.29 km^{2} (27.91 sq mi)

Population (2021)
  - Municipal unit: 2,952
  - Municipal unit density: 40.84/km^{2} (105.8/sq mi)
  - Community: 2,786
- Time zone: UTC+2 (EET)
  - Summer (DST): UTC+3 (EEST)
- Vehicle registration: ΜΙ

Agios Konstantinos (Greek: Άγιος Κωνσταντίνος) is a town and former municipality in Phthiotida (Phthiotis), Greece. After the 2011 administrative division reforms it became part of the municipality of Kamena Vourla and it is now ranked as a municipal unit, with an area of 72.292 km^{2}. Its population was 2,952 in 2021.

The town has a harbor with a regular ferry-boat connection to the islands of Skiathos, Skopelos and Alonnisos. These islands are part of the Northern Sporades archipelago.
