= Stylida =

Town in Phthiotis, Greece

Stylida Στυλίδα
- Municipality
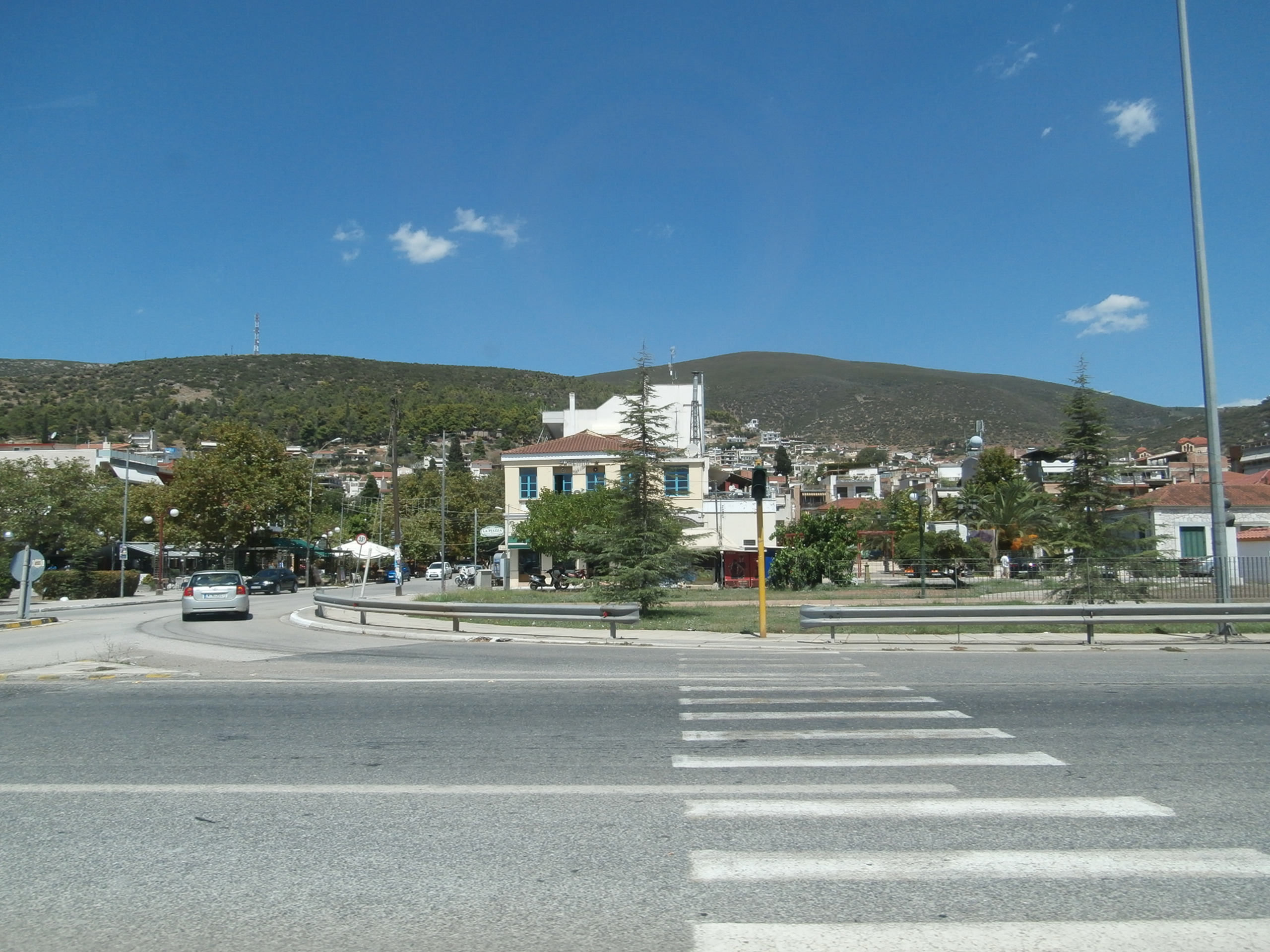

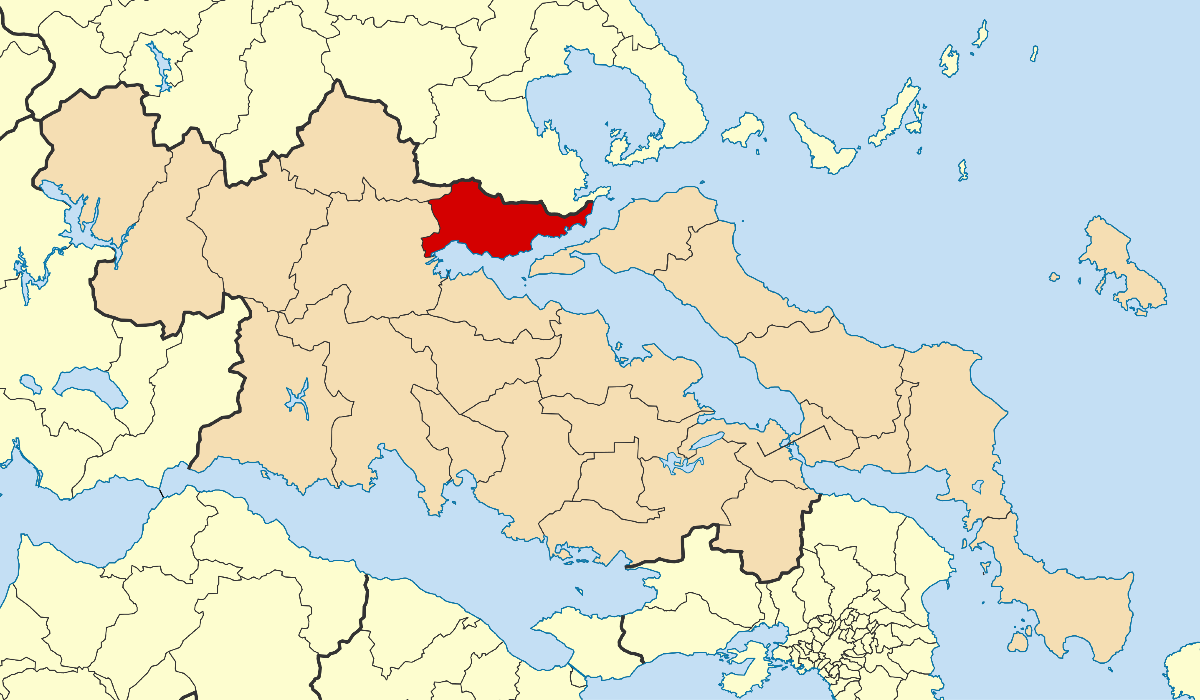

- Location within Greece
- Coordinates: 38°55′N 22°37′E
- Country: Greece
- Administrative region: Central Greece
- Regional unit: Phthiotis

Government
  - Mayor: Ioannis Apostolou (since 2023)

Area
  - Municipality: 463.9 km^{2} (179.1 sq mi)
  - Municipal unit: 202.5 km^{2} (78.2 sq mi)

Population (2021)
  - Municipality: 11,389
  - Density: 24.55/km^{2} (63.59/sq mi)
  - Municipal unit: 5,727
  - Municipal unit density: 28.28/km^{2} (73.25/sq mi)
  - Community: 4,572
- Time zone: UTC+2 (EET)
  - Summer (DST): UTC+3 (EEST)
- Vehicle registration: ΜΙ
- Website: http://www.stylida.gr

Stylida (Greek: Στυλίδα, Katharevousa: Στυλίς, Stylis) is a town and a municipality in Phthiotis, Greece. The population of the municipality is 11,389 according to the 2021 census.

In ancient times the town was named Phalara (Ancient Greek: Φάλαρα).

== Municipality ==
The municipality Stylida was formed at the 2011 local government reform by the merger of the following 3 former municipalities, that became municipal units:

- Echinaioi
- Pelasgia
- Stylida

The municipality has an area of 463.863 km^{2}, the municipal unit 202.477 km^{2}.

== Geography ==
The port town Stylida is situated on the northern shore of the Malian Gulf, and at the southern foot of Mount Othrys, It is 17 km east of Lamia, the capital of Phthiotis.

== Climate ==
Preliminary data from the station of the National Observatory of Athens indicate that the past few years Stylida has a hot semi-arid climate (Köppen climate classification: BSh). Beck et.al (2023) also suggests that marginal nearby coastal areas of Phthiotis fall within this climate for the 1991-2020 period. Stylida has mild winters and very hot summers. During the summer, the frequent Meltemi winds that blow in Greece may provide a strong Foehn effect in the area which is in the lea side of mountains of the central mainland. Most precipitation falls in autumn and during the winter.

Climate data for Stylida 55 m a.s.l.
Month	Jan	Feb	Mar	Apr	May	Jun	Jul	Aug	Sep	Oct	Nov	Dec	Year
Record high °C (°F)	23.8 (74.8)	22.9 (73.2)	28.6 (83.5)	32.3 (90.1)	36.6 (97.9)	41.8 (107.2)	45.3 (113.5)	45.9 (114.6)	37.3 (99.1)	33.2 (91.8)	27.8 (82.0)	25.1 (77.2)	45.9 (114.6)
Mean daily maximum °C (°F)	14.3 (57.7)	16.1 (61.0)	17.8 (64.0)	23.1 (73.6)	27.4 (81.3)	33.6 (92.5)	37.3 (99.1)	36.7 (98.1)	29.9 (85.8)	24.0 (75.2)	19.9 (67.8)	16.1 (61.0)	24.7 (76.4)
Daily mean °C (°F)	8.8 (47.8)	10.0 (50.0)	11.4 (52.5)	16.0 (60.8)	20.3 (68.5)	26.0 (78.8)	29.1 (84.4)	28.6 (83.5)	23.4 (74.1)	18.4 (65.1)	14.9 (58.8)	11.0 (51.8)	18.2 (64.7)
Mean daily minimum °C (°F)	3.3 (37.9)	3.9 (39.0)	5.0 (41.0)	8.8 (47.8)	13.1 (55.6)	18.4 (65.1)	20.9 (69.6)	21.0 (69.8)	17.0 (62.6)	12.8 (55.0)	9.8 (49.6)	5.8 (42.4)	11.7 (53.0)
Record low °C (°F)	−6.8 (19.8)	−4.6 (23.7)	−4.0 (24.8)	−0.1 (31.8)	7.2 (45.0)	11.1 (52.0)	16.3 (61.3)	17.5 (63.5)	10.2 (50.4)	8.3 (46.9)	0.2 (32.4)	−1.6 (29.1)	−6.8 (19.8)
Average rainfall mm (inches)	40.7 (1.60)	26.2 (1.03)	41.9 (1.65)	47.9 (1.89)	27.3 (1.07)	27.2 (1.07)	11.9 (0.47)	37.3 (1.47)	76.1 (3.00)	51.1 (2.01)	38.6 (1.52)	34.5 (1.36)	460.7 (18.14)
Source 1: National Observatory of Athens Monthly Bulletins (Mar 2021 - Aug 2024)
Source 2: Stylida N.O.A station

== Twin towns ==
- Amelia, Italy, since 2002
