= List of settlements in Phthiotis =

This is a list of settlements in Phthiotis, Greece:

== A ==
- Achinos
- Achladi
- Achladia
- Agia Marina, Stylida
- Agia Marina, Tithorea
- Agia Paraskevi, Lamia
- Agia Paraskevi, Tithorea
- Agia Triada
- Agios Charalampos
- Agios Georgios Domokou
- Agios Georgios Tymfristou
- Agios Konstantinos
- Agios Serafeim
- Agios Sostis
- Agios Stefanos
- Agnanti
- Agrapidia
- Amfikleia
- Amouri
- Anatoli
- Anavra
- Anthili
- Anydro
- Archani
- Argyria
- Argyrochori
- Arkitsa
- Asvesti
- Atalanti
- Avlaki

== B ==
- Bralos

== D ==
- Dafni
- Damasta
- Delfino
- Dikastro
- Divri
- Domokos
- Drymaia
- Dyo Vouna

== E ==
- Ekkara
- Elateia
- Eleftherochori
- Exarchos

== F ==
- Frantzis
- Fteri
- Fyliadon

== G ==
- Gardiki
- Gavrakia
- Gerakli
- Giannitsou
- Glyfa
- Gorgopotamos
- Goulemi
- Goura
- Grammeni

== I ==
- Irakleia

== K ==
- Kainourgio
- Kalamaki
- Kalapodi
- Kallidromo
- Kallithea
- Kamena Vourla
- Kampia
- Kanalia
- Karavomylos
- Karyes
- Kastanea
- Kastri
- Kato Tithorea
- Kloni
- Kolokythia
- Komma
- Komnina
- Kompotades
- Koromili
- Kostalexis
- Koumaritsi
- Kyparissi
- Kyriakochori
- Kyrtoni

== L ==
- Ladikou
- Lamia
- Larymna
- Lefka
- Lefkas
- Lefkochori
- Leianokladi
- Litoselo
- Livanates
- Longitsi
- Loutra Ypatis
- Lychnos
- Lygaria

== M ==
- Makrakomi
- Makri
- Makrolivado
- Makryrrachi
- Malesina
- Mantasia
- Marmara
- Martino
- Mavrilo
- Megali Kapsi
- Megali Vrysi
- Megaplatanos
- Melitaia
- Mendenitsa
- Merkada
- Mesaia Kapsi
- Mesochori
- Mesopotamia
- Mexiates
- Modi
- Molos
- Moschochori
- Moschokarya
- Myloi

== N ==
- Nea Makrisi
- Neo Krikello
- Neo Monastiri
- Neochori, Domokos
- Neochori Tymfristou
- Neochori Ypatis
- Neraida
- Nikolitsi

== O ==
- Oiti
- Omvriaki

== P ==
- Palaia Giannitsou
- Palaiochori Dorieon
- Palaiochori Tymfristou
- Palaiokastro
- Palaiokerasia
- Palaiovracha
- Palamas
- Panagia
- Panagitsa
- Pappa
- Pavliani
- Pelasgia
- Peristeri
- Perivlepto
- Perivoli
- Perivoli Domokou
- Petroto
- Pitsi
- Pitsiota
- Platanos
- Platystomo
- Polydendri
- Pougkakia
- Pournari
- Proskynas
- Ptelea
- Pyrgos

== R ==
- Raches
- Regkinio
- Roditsa
- Rodonia
- Rovoliari

== S ==
- Sfaka
- Skarfeia
- Sofiada
- Spartia
- Spercheiada
- Stavros
- Stirfaka
- Stylida
- Syka

== T ==
- Thavmako
- Thermopyles
- Tithorea
- Tithroni
- Tragana
- Trilofo
- Tsoukka
- Tymfristos

== V ==
- Vardali
- Vardates
- Vasilika
- Vathykoilo
- Velesiotes
- Vitoli
- Vouzi

== X ==
- Xylikoi
- Xyniada

== Y ==
- Ypati

== Z ==
- Zeli
- Zilefto

== See also ==
- List of towns and villages of Greece
