= Ekkara =

Ekkara Εκκάρα
- Community
- Location within Greece
- Coordinates: 39°9′N 22°12′E
- Country: Greece
- Administrative region: Central Greece
- Regional unit: Phthiotis
- Municipality: Domokos
- Municipal unit: Thessaliotida

Population (2021)
  - Community: 522
- Time zone: UTC+2 (EET)
  - Summer (DST): UTC+3 (EEST)
- Vehicle registration: ΜΙ

Ekkara (Greek: Εκκάρα, before 1930: Κάτω Αγόριανη - Kato Agoriani) is a village and a community in the municipal unit Thessaliotida, Phthiotis, Greece. The population in 2011 was 522 for the community, which includes the village Ano Agoriani. Ekkara is situated at the southern end of the Thessalian Plain, near the border of the Karditsa regional unit. The Piraeus–Platy railway passes south of the village. Ekkara is located 2 km southeast of Gavrakia, 4 km west of Velesiotes, 10 km northwest of Domokos, 33 km southeast of Karditsa and 36 km northwest of Lamia. There are farmlands in the plains to the north, while there are some forests in the hills to the south. The majority of the population works in agriculture.

== Historical population ==
Year	Population
1981	1,007
1991	756
2001	818
2011	691
2021	522

== See also ==
- List of settlements in Phthiotis
