= Greek National Road 30 =

Trunk road in Greece

National Road 30
- Εθνική Οδός 30
- Route of the EO30 road, in blue

Route information
- Length: 291.0 km (180.8 mi)
- Existed: 9 July 1963–present

Major junctions
- West end: Arta
- East end: Volos

Location
- Country: Greece
- Regions: Epirus; Thessaly
- Primary destinations: Arta; Vourgareli; Trikala; Karditsa; Neo Monastiri; Farsala; Mikrothives; Nea Anchialos; Volos

Highway system
- Highways in Greece; Motorways; National roads
← EO29	→ EO31

Greek National Road 30 (Greek: Εθνική Οδός 30), abbreviated as the EO30, is a national road in central Greece. The EO30 runs from Arta in the west to Volos in the east, passing through Trikala and Karditsa.

== Route ==
The EO30 is officially defined as an east–west road in Epirus and Thessaly: the EO30 runs between Arta in the west and Volos in the east, passing through Vourgareli, Trikala, Karditsa, Neo Monastiri, Farsala, Mikrothives and Nea Anchialos. Between Neo Monastiri and Farsala, the EO30 runs concurrently with the EO3.

The EO30 connects with three motorways: the A1 at Mikrothives, A3 east of Karditsa and west of Sofades, and the A5 in eastern Arta.

On 20 December 2010, the EO30 was realigned between Aetos and Pyli to pass through the newly-opened 1.5-kilometre (0.93-mile) long Gropas Tunnel (Greek: Σήραγγα Γκρόπας) west of Stournareika, bypassing a section of road via Neraidochori that was often blocked by snow during the winter.

== History ==
Ministerial Decision G25871 of 9 July 1963 created the EO30 from all or part of the following short-lived national roads (listed from west to east), which existed by royal decree from 1955 to 1963:

- The old EO25, from Arta to Trikala
- The old EO24, from Trikala to Neo Monastiri
- The old EO1, from Neo Monastiri to Farsala
- The old EO82, from Farsala to Mikrothives
- The old EO16, from Mikrothives to Volos
