= 2006 Acropolis Rally =

Rallying motorsport event

2006 Acropolis Rally 53rd Acropolis Rally
Round 8 of 16 in the 2006 World Rally Championship
← Previous event	Next event →
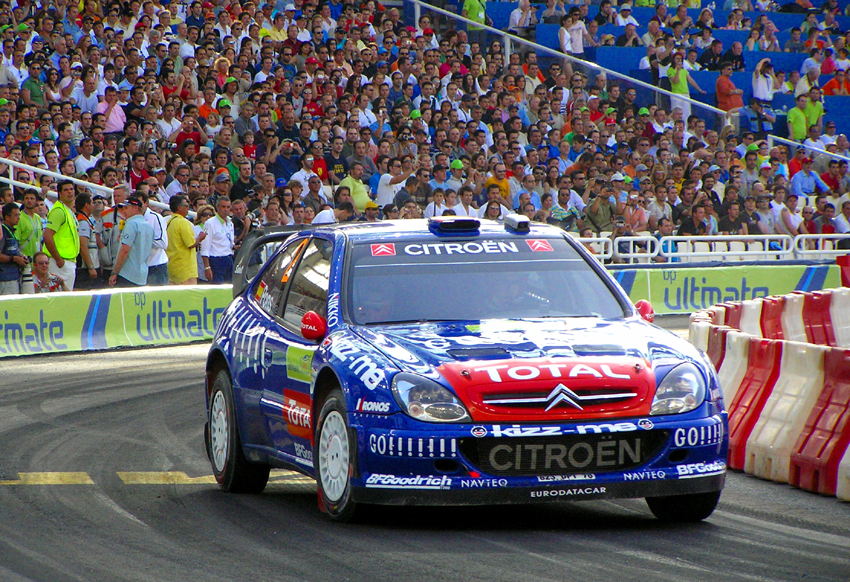
- Xavier Pons during one of the super special stages
- Host country: Greece
- Rally base: Athens
- Dates run: 1 – 4 June 2006
- Stages: 18 (355.62 km; 220.97 miles)
- Stage surface: Gravel
- Transport distance: 923.67 km (573.94 miles)
- Overall distance: 1,279.29 km (794.91 miles)

Statistics
- Crews registered: 84
- Crews: 84 at start, 69 at finish

Overall results
- Overall winner: (Finland) Marcus Grönholm (Finland) Timo Rautiainen (United Kingdom) BP Ford World Rally Team; 3:56:26.8

The 2006 Acropolis Rally was a motor racing event for rally cars that was held over four days between 1 and 4 June 2006. It marked the 53rd running of the Acropolis Rally, and was the eight round of the 2006 World Rally Championship season. The event was also the fourth round of the 2006 Production World Rally Championship. The 2006 event was based in the Olympic Stadium in Athens, Greece and was contested over eighteen special stages, covering a total competitive distance of 355.62km (220.97 miles).

Sebastien Loeb, along with Kronos Citroën World Rally Team were the defending rally winners, having won the previous five rallies in a row. Loeb lead championship rival Marcus Gronholm in the championship by 31 points coming into the weekend.

Gronholm and co-driver Timo Rautiainen won the rally, their first win since the 2006 Swedish Rally and their third win of the season.

== Background ==
=== Entry list ===
The following crews were set to enter the rally. The event was open to crews competing in the World Rally Championship and its support category, the Production World Rally Championship, as well as privateer entries that were not registered to score points in the manufacturer's championship. Twenty two were entered under World Rally Car regulations, as were fifteen in the Production WRC category.

World Rally Car entries competing in the World Rally Championship
No.	Driver	Co-Driver	Entrant	Car	Tyre
1	(France) Sebastien Loeb	(Monaco) Daniel Elena	(Belgium) Kronos Citroën World Rally Team	Citroën Xsara WRC	BF
2	(Spain) Xavier Pons	(Spain) Carlos del Barrio	(Belgium) Kronos Citroën World Rally Team	Citroën Xsara WRC	BF
3	(Finland) Marcus Gronholm	(Finland) Timo Rautiainen	(United Kingdom) BP Ford World Rally Team	Ford Focus RS WRC 06	BF
4	(Finland) Mikko Hirvonen	(Finland) Jarmo Lehtinen	(United Kingdom) BP Ford World Rally Team	Ford Focus RS WRC 06	BF
5	(Norway) Petter Solberg	(United Kingdom) Phil Mills	(Japan) Subaru World Rally Team	Impreza WRC 2006	P
6	(Australia) Chris Atkinson	(Australia) Glenn Macneall	(Japan) Subaru World Rally Team	Impreza WRC 2006	P
7	(Austria) Manfred Stohl	(Austria) Ilka Minor	OMV Peugeot Norway World Rally Team	Peugeot 307 WRC	BF
8	(Norway) Henning Solberg	(Norway) Cato Menkerud	OMV Peugeot Norway World Rally Team	Peugeot 307 WRC	BF
9	(United Kingdom) Matthew Wilson	(United Kingdom) Michael Orr	(United Kingdom) Stobart VK M-Sport Ford Rally Team	Ford Focus RS WRC 06	BF
10	(Finland) Kosti Katajamäki	(Finland) Timo Alanne	(United Kingdom) Stobart VK M-Sport Ford Rally Team	Ford Focus RS WRC 06	BF
11	(Finland) Harri Rovanperä	(Finland) Risto Pietiläinen	(Austria) Red Bull Škoda Team	Škoda Fabia WRC	BF
12	(Austria) Andreas Aigner	(Germany) Klaus Wicha	(Austria) Red Bull Škoda Team	Škoda Fabia WRC	BF

Group N entries competing in the Production WRC
No.	Driver	Co-Driver	Entrant	Car
31	(Japan) Toshihiro Arai	(New Zealand) Tony Sircombe	(Japan) Subaru Team Arai	Subaru Impreza WRX STI
32	(Argentina) Marcos Ligato	(Argentina) Rubén García	(Argentina) Tango Rally Team	Mitsubishi Lancer Evo IX
34	(Argentina) Sebastián Beltran	(Chile) Ricardo Rojas	(Argentina) Tango Rally Team	Mitsubishi Lancer Evo IX
35	(Argentina) Gabriel Pozzo	(Argentina) Daniel Stillo	(Argentina) Tango Rally Team	Mitsubishi Lancer Evo IX
36	(San Marino) Mirco Baldacci	(Italy) Giovanni Agnese	(France) Mitsubishi Paris West Team	Mitsubishi Lancer Evo IX
37	(Finland) Jari-Matti Latvala	(Finland) Miikka Anttila	(Italy) Motoring Club	Subaru Impreza WRX STI
38	(Poland) Leszek Kuzaj	(Poland) Maciej Szczepaniak	(Japan) Syms Rally Team	Subaru Impreza WRX STI
39	(Qatar) Nasser Al-Attiyah	(United Kingdom) Chris Patterson	(Qatar) QMMF	Subaru Impreza WRX STI
40	(Italy) Stefano Marrini	(Italy) Sandroni Tiziana	(Italy) Errani Team Group	Mitsubishi Lancer Evo IX
41	(Japan) Takuma Kamada	(Japan) Hakaru Ichino	(Japan) Subaru Team Quasys	Subaru Impreza WRX STI
42	(Russia) Sergey Uspenskiy	(Russia) Dmitriy Eremeev	Subaru Rally Team Russia	Subaru Impreza WRX STI
43	(Slovenia) Andrej Jereb	(Slovenia) Miran Kacin	(Latvia) OMV CEE World Rally Team	Mitsubishi Lancer Evo IX
45	(Finland) Aki Teiskonen	(Finland) Miika Teiskonen	(Japan) Syms Rally Team	Subaru Impreza WRX STI
46	(United Kingdom) Nigel Heath	(United Kingdom) Steve Lancaster	(United Kingdom) PSM Motorsport	Subaru Impreza WRX STI
60	(Greece) Dimitris Nassoulas	(Greece) Mihalis Patrikoussis	(Greece) Eko Racing Team	Mitsubishi Lancer Evo VII

Other major entries
No.	Driver	Co-Driver	Entrant	Car
14	(Spain) Dani Sordo	(Spain) Marc Martí	(Belgium) Kronos Racing	Citroën Xsara WRC
16	(Finland) Toni Gardemeister	(Finland) Jakke Honkanen	(Italy) Astra Racing	Citroën Xsara WRC
17	(Czech Republic) Jan Kopecký	(Czech Republic) Filip Schovánek	(Czech Republic) Czech RT Škoda Kopecký	Škoda Fabia WRC
18	(Belgium) François Duval	(France) Patrick Pivato	(Belgium) First Motorsport Škoda	Škoda Fabia WRC
19	(Greece) Armodios Vovos	(Greece) El-Em	(Greece) Armodios Vovos	Subaru Impreza S11 WRC 05
20	(Finland) Jussi Välimäki	(Finland) Jarkko Kalliolepo	(United Kingdom) MMSP LTD	Mitsubishi Lancer WRC 05
66	(Greece) Konstantinos Apostolou	(Greece) Kriadis Mihalis	(Greece) Konstantinos Apostolou	Mitsubishi Lancer Evo VI
67	(Greece) Manos Stefanis	(Greece) Konstantinos Stafanis	(Greece) Manos Stefanis	Ford Focus WRC 02
78	(Greece) Kirkos Junior	(Greece) Ioannis Sengos	(Greece) Kirkos Junior	Mitsubishi Lancer Evo VII
96	(Greece) Dionissis Gazetas	(Greece) Athanasios Papageorgiou	(Greece) Dionissis Gazetas	Mitsubishi Lancer Evo VII

=== Itinerary ===
All dates and times are CEST (UTC+2).

Date	No.	Time span	Stage name	Distance
1 June	—	After 8:00	Amigdaleza [Shakedown]	4.40 km
1 June	SS1	After 18:00	Athens Olympic Stadium 1	2.80 km
2 June		8:00	Service A, Athens	—N/a
2 June	SS2	After 8:38	Imittos 1	11.44 km
2 June	SS3	After 9:56	Skourta 1	23.80 km
2 June	SS4	After 11:14	Thiva 1	23.76 km
2 June		13:22	Service B, Athens	—N/a
2 June	SS5	After 14:20	Imittos 2	11.44 km
2 June	SS6	After 15:38	Skourta 2	23.76 km
2 June	SS7	After 16:52	Thiva 2	23.76 km
2 June		18:46	Service C, Athens	—N/a
3 June		8:00	Service D, Athens	—N/a
3 June	SS8	After 8:57	Mandra 1	12.60 km
3 June	SS9	After 9:50	Kineta 1	37.33 km
3 June	SS10	After 11:13	Psatha 1	17.41 km
3 June		12:51	Service E, Athens	—N/a
3 June	SS11	After 14:08	Mandra 2	12.60 km
3 June	SS12	After 15:01	Kineta 2	37.33 km
3 June	SS13	After 16:24	Psatha 2	17.41 km
3 June		17:44	Service F, Athens	—N/a
4 June		6:40	Service G, Athens	—N/a
4 June	SS14	After 7:47	Avlonas 1	23.90 km
4 June	SS15	After 8:55	Agia Sotira 1	24.77 km
4 June		10:08	Service H, Athens	—N/a
4 June	SS16	After 11:35	Avlonas 2	23.90 km
4 June	SS17	After 12:43	Agia Sotira 2	24.77 km
4 June		13:46	Service I, Athens	—N/a
4 June	SS18	After 14:15	Athens Olympic Stadium 2	2.80 km

== Report ==
=== Overall ===
==== Summary ====
Petter Solberg would win the shakedown on thursday, beginning what would be his 100th world rally. But it would be Loeb that won the first stage of the rally, a short super special stage inside of the Olympic Stadium in Athens. Gronholn would end up second, while shakedown winner Solberg would end up thirteenth on the opening day.

Friday would be a display of absolute dominance by Gronholm, who won every single stage of the day. Petter Solberg would manage to end the day ahead of Loeb despite experiencing three punctures in the morning. Petter's brother Henning would suffer a tyre blow-out at high speed, dropping him to seventh overall, while Chris Atkinson was struck with a front differential issue, rendering his morning ruined. The afternoon section of the leg would be less chaotic, with Hirvonen ending the day in fourth ahead of the surprisingly quick Duval. Gardemeister would drop to eighth after hitting a rock and experiencing shoulder pain in stage seven, handing sixth to Stohl.

Saturday would entail a closer battle between Gronholm and Loeb; Gronholm would win four of the day's six stages, but crucially, Loeb would win the longest stage of the rally twice, limiting the damage and finishing the day within two minutes of the leader. Despite being second, a puncture resulting in heavy damage in the last stage of the day raised concerns that Loeb wouldn't be able to continue. Henning Solberg would lose much of his braking power, but still set a competitive third fastest time in stage ten. Petter Solberg, meanwhile, would be forced to retire after crashing on the road section between stages twelve and thirteen. This would promote Hirvonen to third overall.

On Sunday, Gronholm would extend his lead over Loeb despite overall driving cautiously to avoid a retirement on the rough Greek stages. It would be a recovering Petter Solberg who won all but the super special stage on the day, recovering to an impressive seventh after restarting in ninth. Loeb would not risk anything, continuing to fall behind Gronholm in order to protect his second place, which he successfully maintained. The tight battle for fourth would be interrupted by Stohl retiring after a roll and Sordo losing a minute with an engine issue. This would hand fourth in the rally to Gardemeister. Henning Solberg held fifth by under a second from the charging Sordo. After an impressive start, Duval would retire on Saturday to finish thirteenth overall.

==== Classification ====
Position		No.	Driver	Co-driver	Entrant	Car	Time	Difference	Points
Event	Class	No.	Driver	Co-driver	Entrant	Car	Time	Difference	Points
1	1	3	(Finland) Marcus Gronholm	(Finland) Timo Rautiainen	(United Kingdom) BP Ford World Rally Team	Ford Focus RS WRC 06	3:56:26.8	0.0	10
2	2	1	(France) Sebastien Loeb	(Monaco) Daniel Elena	(Belgium) Kronos Citroën World Rally Team	Citroën Xsara WRC	3:58:53.6	+2:26.8	8
3	3	4	(Finland) Mikko Hirvonen	(Finland) Jarmo Lehtinen	(United Kingdom) BP Ford World Rally Team	Ford Focus RS WRC 06	4:00:10.6	+3:43.8	6
4	4	16	(Finland) Toni Gardemeister	(Finland) Jakke Honkanen	(Italy) Astra Racing	Citroën Xsara WRC	4:00:47.6	+4:20.8	5
5	5	8	(Norway) Henning Solberg	(Norway) Cato Menkerud	OMV Peugeot Norway World Rally Team	Peugeot 307 WRC	4:01:22.4	+4:55.6	4
6	6	14	(Spain) Dani Sordo	(Spain) Marc Martí	(Belgium) Kronos Racing	Citroën Xsara WRC	4:01:23.2	+4:56.4	3
7	7	5	(Norway) Petter Solberg	(United Kingdom) Phil Mills	(Japan) Subaru World Rally Team	Impreza WRC 2006	4:02:01.2	+5:34.4	2
8	8	2	(Spain) Xavier Pons	(Spain) Carlos del Barrio	(Belgium) Kronos Citroën World Rally Team	Citroën Xsara WRC	4:04:45.8	+8:19.0	1
9	9	20	(Finland) Jussi Välimäki	(Finland) Jarkko Kalliolepo	(United Kingdom) MMSP LTD	Mitsubishi Lancer WRC 05	4:07:55.5	+11:28.7	0
10	10	9	(United Kingdom) Matthew Wilson	(United Kingdom) Michael Orr	(United Kingdom) Stobart VK M-Sport Ford Rally Team	Ford Focus RS WRC 06	4:09:57.6	+13:30.8	0
11	11	6	(Australia) Chris Atkinson	(Australia) Glenn Macneall	(Japan) Subaru World Rally Team	Impreza WRC 2006	4:10:28.6	+14:01.8	0
12	12	11	(Finland) Harri Rovanperä	(Finland) Risto Pietiläinen	(Austria) Red Bull Škoda Team	Škoda Fabia WRC	4:11:02.4	+14:35.6	0
13	13	18	(Belgium) François Duval	(France) Patrick Pivato	(Belgium) First Motorsport Škoda	Škoda Fabia WRC	4:14:31.2	+18:04.4	0
14	14	12	(Austria) Andreas Aigner	(Germany) Klaus Wicha	(Austria) Red Bull Škoda Team	Škoda Fabia WRC	4:17:17.7	+20:50.9	0
15	15	19	(Greece) Armodios Vovos	(Greece) "El-Em"	(Greece) Armodios Vovos	Subaru Impreza S11 WRC 05	4:23:17.1	+26:50.3	0
16	16	17	(Czech Republic) Jan Kopecký	(Czech Republic) Filip Schovánek	(Czech Republic) Czech RT Škoda Kopecký	Škoda Fabia WRC	4:24:45.6	+28:18.8	0
26	17	10	(Finland) Kosti Katajamäki	(Finland) Timo Alanne	(United Kingdom) Stobart VK M-Sport Ford Rally Team	Ford Focus RS WRC 06	4:44:03.2	+47:36.4	0
49	18	96	(Greece) Dionissis Gazetas	(Greece) Athanasios Papageorgiou	(Greece) Dionissis Gazetas	Mitsubishi Lancer Evo VII	5:38:38.9	+1:42:12.1	0
55	19	78	(Greece) "Kirkos Junior"	(Greece) Ioannis Sengos	(Greece) "Kirkos Junior"	Mitsubishi Lancer Evo VII	5:55:23.1	+1:58:56.3	0
Retired SS14		7	(Austria) Manfred Stohl	(Austria) Ilka Minor	OMV Peugeot Norway World Rally Team	Peugeot 307 WRC	Accident		0
Retired SS11		67	(Greece) Manos Stefanis	(Greece) Konstantinos Stafanis	(Greece) Manos Stefanis	Ford Focus WRC 02	Fire		0
Retired SS8		66	(Greece) Konstantinos Apostolou	(Greece) Kriadis Mihalis	(Greece) Konstantinos Apostolou	Mitsubishi Lancer Evo VI	Axle		0

==== Special Stages ====
All dates and times are EEST (UTC+3).

Day	Stage	Time	Name	Length (km)	Winner	Time	Rally leader
1 (1/2 June)	SS1	18:00	Athens Olympic Stadium 1	2.79	(France) Sébastien Loeb	2:21.4	(France) Sébastien Loeb
1 (1/2 June)	SS2	8:38	Imittos 1	11.43	(Finland) Marcus Grönholm	7:03.3	(Finland) Marcus Grönholm
1 (1/2 June)	SS3	9:56	Skourta 1	23.79	(Finland) Marcus Grönholm	14:40.1	(Finland) Marcus Grönholm
1 (1/2 June)	SS4	11:14	Thiva 1	23.76	(Finland) Marcus Grönholm	17:16.9	(Finland) Marcus Grönholm
1 (1/2 June)	SS5	14:20	Imittos 2	11.43	(Finland) Marcus Grönholm	6:58.3	(Finland) Marcus Grönholm
1 (1/2 June)	SS6	15:38	Skourta 2	23.79	(Finland) Marcus Grönholm	14:29.6	(Finland) Marcus Grönholm
1 (1/2 June)	SS7	16:56	Thiva 2	23.76	(Finland) Marcus Grönholm	16:54.1	(Finland) Marcus Grönholm
2 (3 June)	SS8	8:57	Mandra 1	12.6	(Finland) Marcus Grönholm	8:50.7	(Finland) Marcus Grönholm
2 (3 June)	SS9	9:50	Kineta 1	37.33	(France) Sébastien Loeb	25:39.1	(Finland) Marcus Grönholm
2 (3 June)	SS10	11:13	Psatha 1	17.4	(Finland) Marcus Grönholm	11:21.3	(Finland) Marcus Grönholm
2 (3 June)	SS11	14:08	Mandra 2	12.6	(Finland) Marcus Grönholm	8:43.1	(Finland) Marcus Grönholm
2 (3 June)	SS12	15:01	Kineta 2	37.33	(France) Sébastien Loeb	25:20.2	(Finland) Marcus Grönholm
2 (3 June)	SS13	16:24	Psatha 2	17.4	(Finland) Marcus Grönholm	11:23.6	(Finland) Marcus Grönholm
3 (4 June)	SS14	7:47	Avlonas 1	23.89	(Norway) Petter Solberg	14:07.2	(Finland) Marcus Grönholm
3 (4 June)	SS15	8:55	Agia Sotira 1	24.77	(Norway) Petter Solberg	17:02.0	(Finland) Marcus Grönholm
3 (4 June)	SS16	11:35	Avlonas 2	23.89	(Norway) Petter Solberg	14:00.6	(Finland) Marcus Grönholm
3 (4 June)	SS17	12:43	Agia Sotira 2	24.77	(Norway) Petter Solberg	16:49.6	(Finland) Marcus Grönholm
3 (4 June)	SS18	14:15	Athens Olympic Stadium 2	2.79	(Finland) Marcus Grönholm	2:21.7	(Finland) Marcus Grönholm

==== Championship Standings ====
Pos.	Drivers' Championship			Manufacturers' Championship		
Pos.	Move	Driver	Points	Move	Manufacturer	Points
1		(France) Sébastien Loeb	74		(Belgium) Kronos Citroën World Rally Team	96
2		(Finland) Marcus Gronholm	45		(United Kingdom) BP Ford World Rally Team	81
3		(Spain) Dani Sordo	33		(Japan) Subaru World Rally Team	63
4	2	(Finland) Mikko Hirvonen	21		OMV Peugeot Norway World Rally Team	41
5	1	(Austria) Manfred Stohl	20		(United Kingdom) Stobart VK M-Sport Ford Rally Team	17

=== Production WRC ===
==== Classification ====
Position		No.	Driver	Co-driver	Entrant	Car	Time	Difference	Points
Event	Class	No.	Driver	Co-driver	Entrant	Car	Time	Difference	Points
17	1	39	(Qatar) Nasser Al-Attiyah	(United Kingdom) Chris Patterson	(Qatar) QMMF	Subaru Impreza WRX STI	4:28:43.3	0.0	10
18	2	35	(Argentina) Gabriel Pozzo	(Argentina) Daniel Stillo	(Argentina) Tango Rally Team	Mitsubishi Lancer Evo IX	4:28:55.3	+12.0	8
19	3	45	(Finland) Aki Teiskonen	(Finland) Miika Teiskonen	(Japan) Syms Rally Team	Subaru Impreza WRX STI	3:46:19.0	+1:01.2	6
20	4	36	(San Marino) Mirco Baldacci	(Italy) Giovanni Agnese	(France) Mitsubishi Paris West Team	Mitsubishi Lancer Evo IX	4:32:37.4	+3:54.1	5
21	5	31	(Japan) Toshihiro Arai	(New Zealand) Tony Sircombe	(Japan) Subaru Team Arai	Subaru Impreza WRX STI	4:33:37.7	+5:54.4	4
22	6	37	(Finland) Jari-Matti Latvala	(Finland) Miikka Anttila	(Italy) Motoring Club	Subaru Impreza WRX STI	4:36:11.2	+7:27.9	3
24	7	32	(Argentina) Marcos Ligato	(Argentina) Rubén García	(Argentina) Tango Rally Team	Mitsubishi Lancer Evo IX	4:41:48.2	+13:04.9	2
27	8	40	(Italy) Stefano Marrini	(Italy) Sandroni Tiziana	(Italy) Errani Team Group	Mitsubishi Lancer Evo IX	4:44:58.3	+16:15.0	1
29	9	42	(Russia) Sergey Uspenskiy	(Russia) Dmitriy Eremeev	Subaru Rally Team Russia	Subaru Impreza WRX STI	4:49:35.8	+20:52.5	0
30	10	34	(Argentina) Sebastián Beltran	(Chile) Ricardo Rojas	(Argentina) Tango Rally Team	Mitsubishi Lancer Evo IX	4:52:02.5	+23:19.2	0
32	11	46	(United Kingdom) Nigel Heath	(United Kingdom) Steve Lancaster	(United Kingdom) PSM Motorsport	Subaru Impreza WRX STI	4:58:07.0	+29:23.7	0
33	12	41	(Japan) Takuma Kamada	(Japan) Hakaru Ichino	(Japan) Subaru Team Quasys	Subaru Impreza WRX STI	5:03:11.2	+34:27.9	0
37	13	43	(Slovenia) Andrej Jereb	(Slovenia) Miran Kacin	(Latvia) OMV CEE World Rally Team	Mitsubishi Lancer Evo IX	5:10:08.6	+41:25.3	0
44	14	60	(Greece) Dimitris Nassoulas	(Greece) Mihalis Patrikoussis	(Greece) Eko Racing Team	Mitsubishi Lancer Evo VII	5:21:50.1	+53:06.8	0
Retired SS4		38	(Poland) Leszek Kuzaj	(Poland) Maciej Szczepaniak	(Japan) Syms Rally Team	Subaru Impreza WRX STI	Accident		0

==== Championship Standings ====
Pos.	Drivers' Championship		
Pos.	Move	Driver	Points
1		(Qatar) Nasser Al-Attiyah	34
2	1	(San Marino) Mirco Baldacci	17
3	1	(Japan) Toshihiro Arai	15
4	2	(Poland) Leszek Kuzaj	13
5		(Japan) Fumio Nutahara	10
