= Acropolis Rally =

Rally competition in Greece

Acropolis Rally Ράλι Ακρόπολις
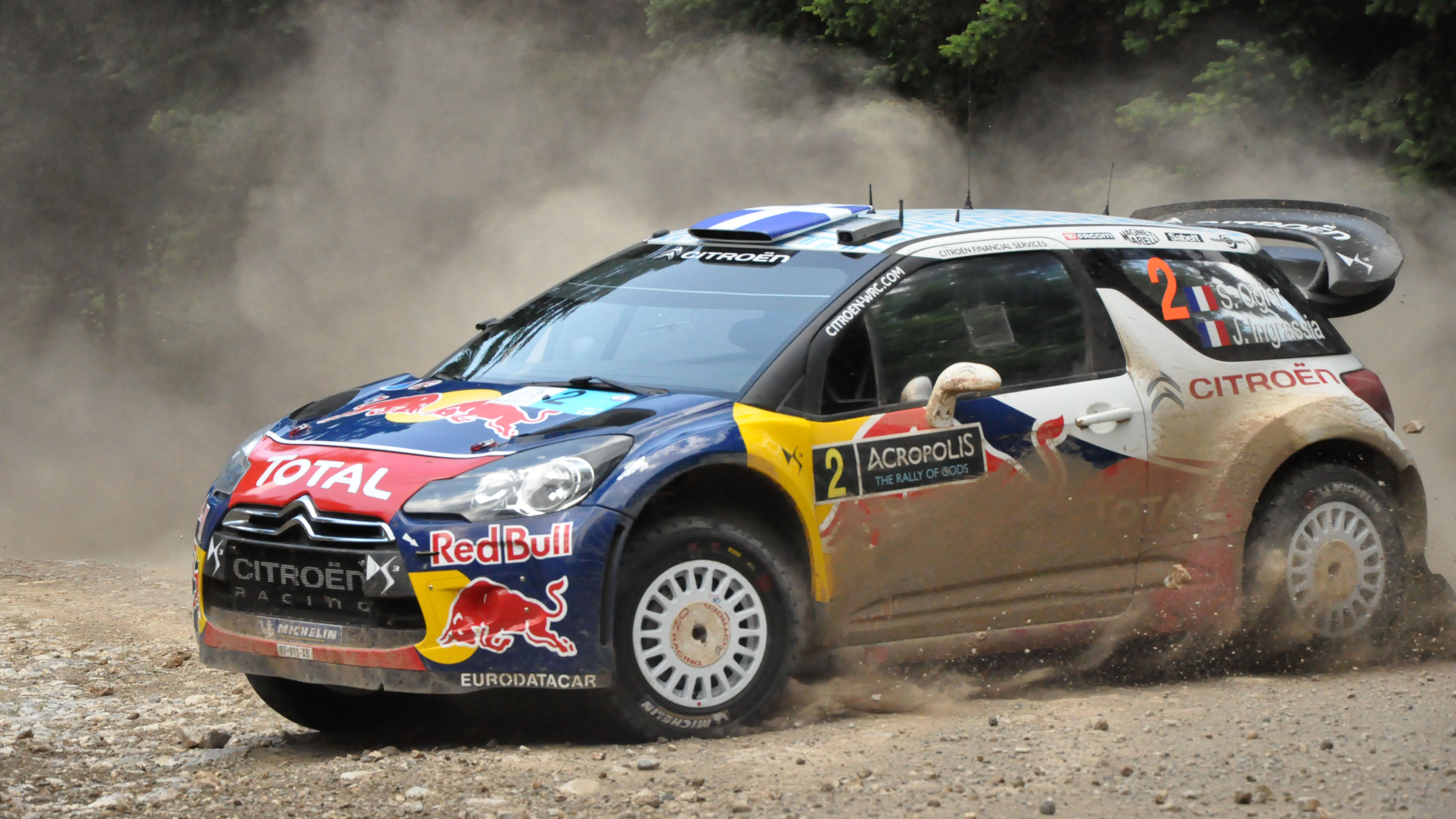
- Sébastien Ogier driving a Citroën DS3 WRC at the 2011 Acropolis Rally
- Status: active
- Genre: motorsporting event
- Dates: May - June, September
- Frequency: annual
- Locations: Athens, Lamia, Loutraki
- Country: Greece
- Inaugurated: 1951
- Founder: ELPA
- Area: Attica, Fthiotis, Phokis, Corinthia
- Website: www.acropolisrally.gr

The Acropolis Rally of Greece (Greek: Ράλλυ Ακρόπολις) is a rally competition that is part of the World Rally Championship (WRC). The rally is held on very dusty, rough, rocky and fast mountain roads in mainland Greece, usually during the Greek hot summer period. The rally is known for its harsh roads and its temperatures.

== History ==
The Acropolis Rally has been held since 1951 by the Greek Motorsports Organization Automobile and Touring Club of Greece (ELPA), making it one of the longest-standing competitions in world rallying. Many world renown drivers have won this event including Walter Röhrl, Björn Waldegård, Ari Vatanen, Stig Blomqvist, Juha Kankkunen, Carlos Sainz and Colin McRae, among others.

Due to the nature of the race, with a mix of rough, twisty, fast mountain stages and coupled with blistering heat and choking dust, the Acropolis Rally is one of the toughest on the European and World Rally circuits. The cars used in the race must be built with extra sturdiness in order to cope with the fast but rock-strewn stages. Drivers and co-drivers also have to contend with the pounding terrain and high summer temperatures which often reached 50 °C within the cockpit. Many drivers rate the event as a test of skill, patience, bravery and endurance in the past, going as far as comparing the Acropolis with the infamous Safari Rally.

In August 2020, rumours started to emerge about the possible return of the rally to the World Rally Championship. Greek Prime Minister Kyriakos Mitsotakis assured that the government was ready to support the organizers financially. In late December of the same year, the Hellenic Ministry of Sport agreed with the Organizing Committee for Motorsport to revive the Acropolis Rally.

In March 2021, it was officially announced that the Acropolis Rally of Gods would return for the 2021 World Rally Championship, taking place in September of the same year, with Lamia as the host city.

The Historic Acropolis Rally is a [[classic rally[]] held since 2002, and is included in the European Historic Rally Championship.

== Stages ==
The Acropolis Rally started out as a marathon/endurance type event back in the early 1950s. When the rally became part of the World Rally Championship after 1973, the crews had to face up to 800 competitive kilometers, in some of the most gruelling stages and conditions imaginable. This trip involved locations all over Greece up to the late 1980s, such as the more known Kalambaka and Meteora, stages near Mount Olympus, Attica, Central Greece, and even down south in the Peloponnese. The traditional start always took place under the legendary Acropolis in Athens, and the finish ceremony was carried out in the Panathenaic stadium.

With rallies ever so shrinking due to the new demands of the World Rally Championship and transitioning to "sprint" type events, the Acropolis Rally followed suit, basing the whole rally in certain areas and using stages nearby. The classic rally headquarters in the 1990s and early 2000s were the cities of Lamia and Itea.

In 2005, the rally headquarters and the service park moved to the Athens Olympic Sports Complex. In the 2007 edition, the rally headquarters and the service park moved to the Markopoulo Olympic Equestrian Centre. In 2008, the headquarters where situated at the Tatoi military airport, and that was the last time since that the rally was based in Attica, and that special stages were used in that area. In 2009 the rally headquarters and the service park were moved to Loutraki near the Corinth Canal, with stages in Argolis and Corinthia used for the rally. For the 2016 ERC Season, the event returned to Lamia. The 2026 edition will be held again in Loutraki.

=== Classic stages ===
The best stages in Greece are undoubtedly in the Phthiotis and Phokis regions, mainly around the Parnassus and Giona mountains. Recently used stages like Bauxites/Karoutes, Drosohori, Pavliani, Kaloskopi, Elatia, Rengini, Eleftherohori and Moschokarya are favorites amongst drivers and fans alike, due to their fast and flowing nature, allowing the cars to reach their full potential, in a rally where it is otherwise risky to push hard, due to the hard surface which can damage the cars heavily. The same goes for other famous rally stages in Greece, like the Kineta and Aghi Theodori stages around the Geraneia mountains in Corinthia, Prodromos, Livadeia and Thiva in Boeotia, Parnonas in mainland Peloponnese. Other honorable mentions include the fast and beautiful Parnitha stage, the car breaker Ymitos, plus the Assopia and Aghia Sotira stages in Attica, as well as the spectacular Meteora stage which was last used in the late 1980s in the longer version of the rally. Several stages feature significant archeological landmarks like the "Klenia-Mycenae" stage which includes the archeological site of Mycenae.

Many classic special stages (f.e. Grammeni Oxia, Gardiki, Hani Zagana, Evangelistria, Prodromos, Aliki, Loukissia) were asphalt paved at some point in the past, so they are no longer used in the Acropolis Rally, since it is a mainly gravel-based event.

=== The "Tarzan" test in Evrytania ===
This special stage, originally called the Fourna and Rentina test, is an unusually difficult 30.3 km test. The name "Tarzan" originates from Giorgos Burgos, who was from Fourna in Evritania, lived in Athens and was a police officer. He suffered from tuberculosis and was given a few months to live. He then moved to Fourna, and reached the age of 92. The Acropolis rally passed through the hut of Giorgos, whose nickname was "Tarzan", from the 22nd edition of the rally in 1975. At that time the special route was called "Fourna". The stage first appeared under the new name "Tarzan" in the 26th Acropolis Rally in 1979, in honor of Giorgos Bourgos, a local resident and rally fan. The presence of the full stage in the rally was continuous until the 42nd running of the event in 1995. For its last four years the route was renamed "Rentina-Tarzan", after using the second half of the classic 30,3 km (finishing in Tsoukka).

In the Acropolis Rally of 2003, when the event reached its 50th anniversary, a shortened 20.65 km version of the stage, called "New Tarzan", was held twice, paying tribute to the route's legacy in the event.

Didier Auriol in June 1991, dismantled a wheelrim and his suspension there, losing the lead and the overall victory in the race. Nevertheless, he later stated that "Tarzan" was his favorite Acropolis Rally special stage.

The Tarzan stage returned to the 2021 Acropolis Rally, as the Power Stage of the event, together with many other classic tests.

=== Super Special Stages ===
The Rally is also known for having used great Super Special Stages over the years.

This trend started with the Marlboro Super Stage held in the city of Anavissos, south of Athens, in the early 1990s. After the event base moved to Itea and Lamia in the early 2000s, a Super Special Stage was used in the outskirts of Lilea Parnassos.

In 2005 a new stage was introduced; a superspecial stage held within the Athens Olympic Stadium. The Super Special Stage (SSS) was the highlight of the rally as well as the 2005 WRC schedule and in the same year, the Acropolis Rally was awarded the “Rally of the Year” title. It was loved by drivers and fans alike, as the packed stadium provided an "arena" feeling to the stage.

In 2006 there were 2 superspecials, again in the same stadium. The rally headquarters and the service park also moved from Lamia to the Athens Olympic Sports Complex. In the 2007 event, the superspecial (along with the rally headquarters and the service park) moved to the Markopoulo Olympic Equestrian Centre. In 2008 the super special stage was held twice at the Tatoi military airport. In 2018, a superspecial was based again in the Markopoulo Olympic Equestrian Centre.

In the 2022 event, the rally made a return to the Athens Olympic Stadium for the rally-opening super special stage.

== Winners ==
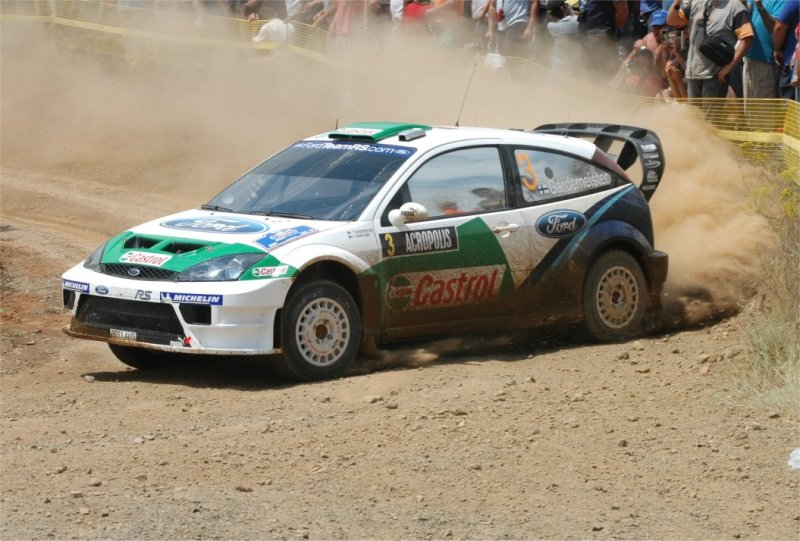
Toni Gardemeister with Ford Focus RS WRC 05 at the 2005 event

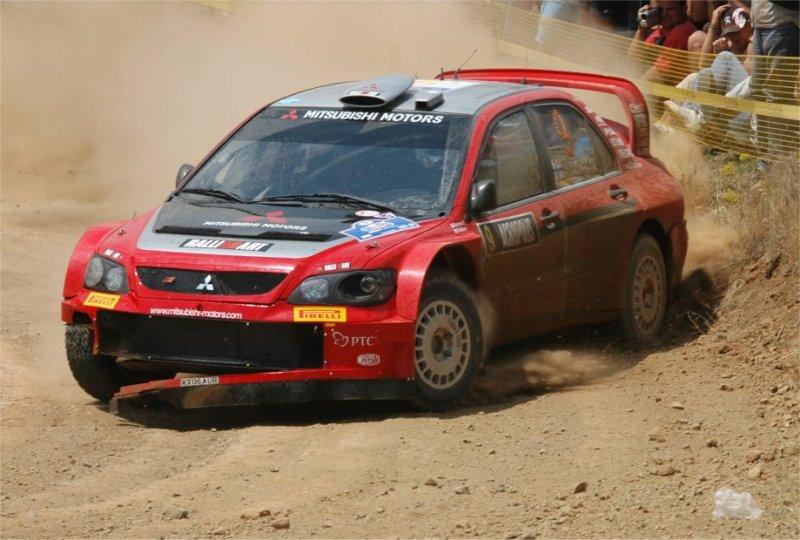
Harri Rovanperä with a Mitsubishi Lancer WRC05 at the 2005 event.

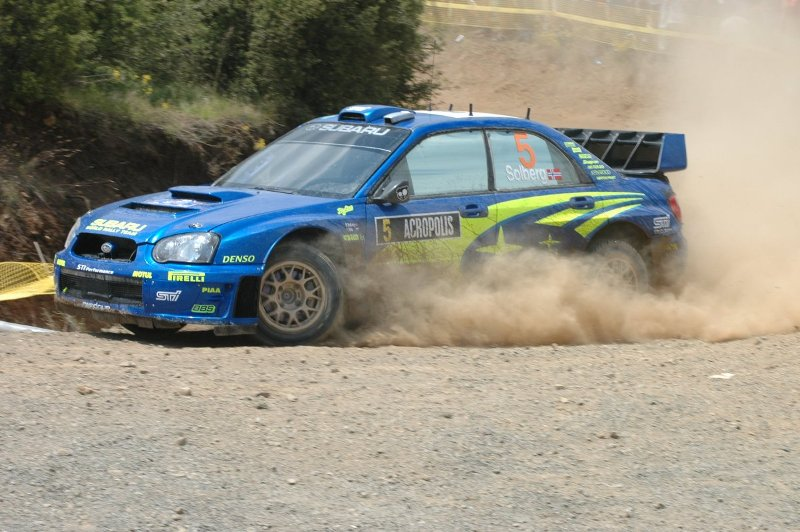
Petter Solberg with a Subaru Impreza WRC05 at the 2005 event

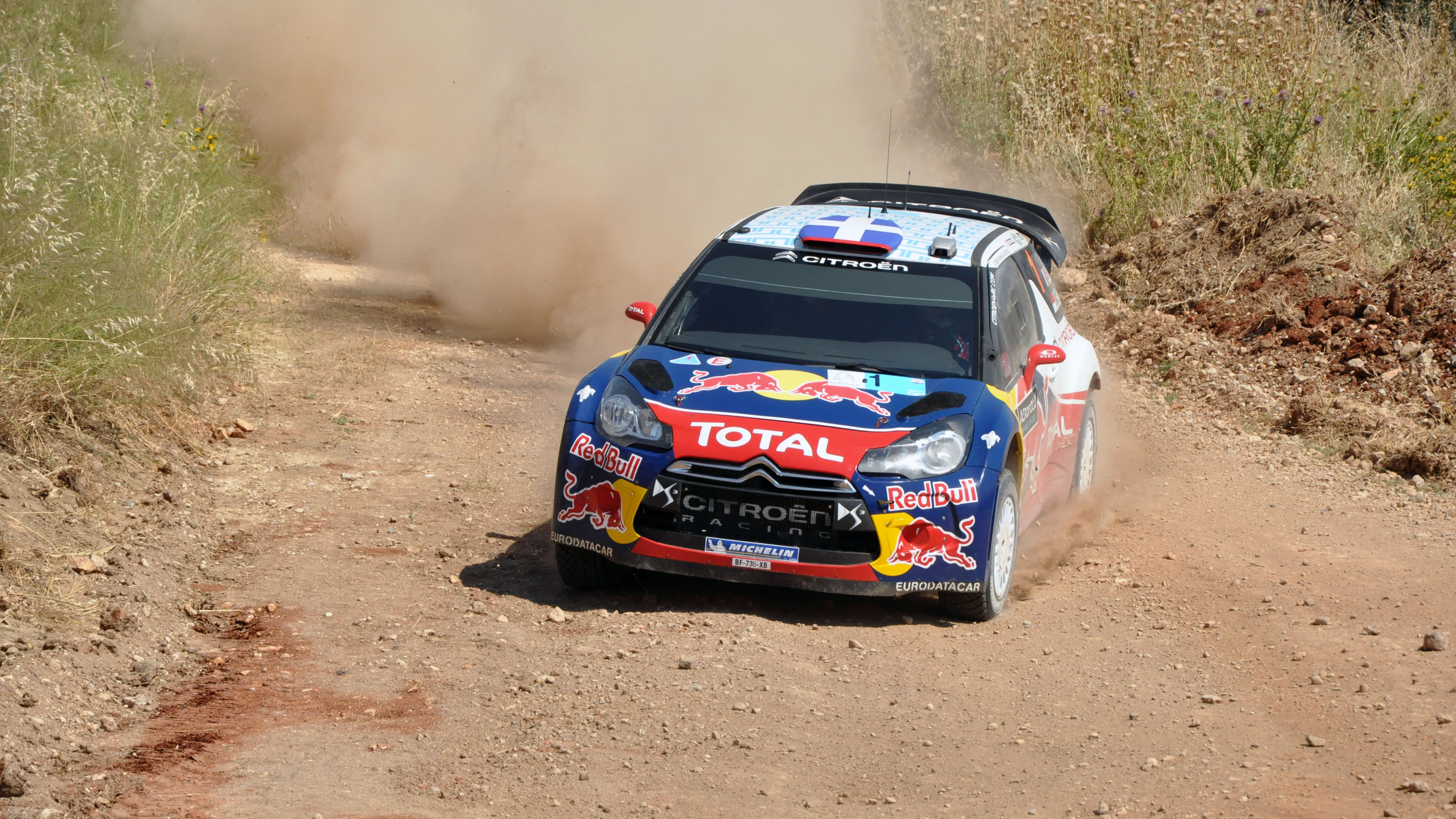
Loeb with Citroën DS3 WRC at the 2011 event

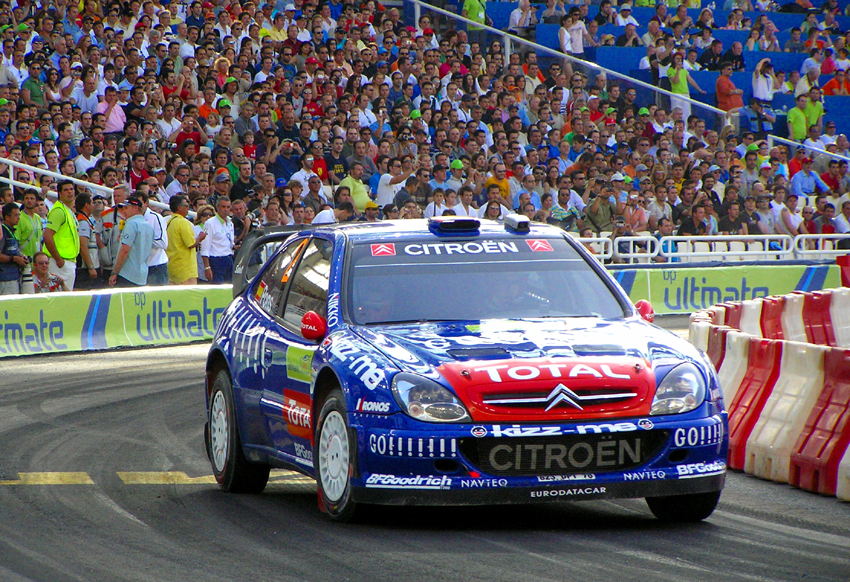
Xavier Pons with a Citroën Xsara WRC at the 2006 event.

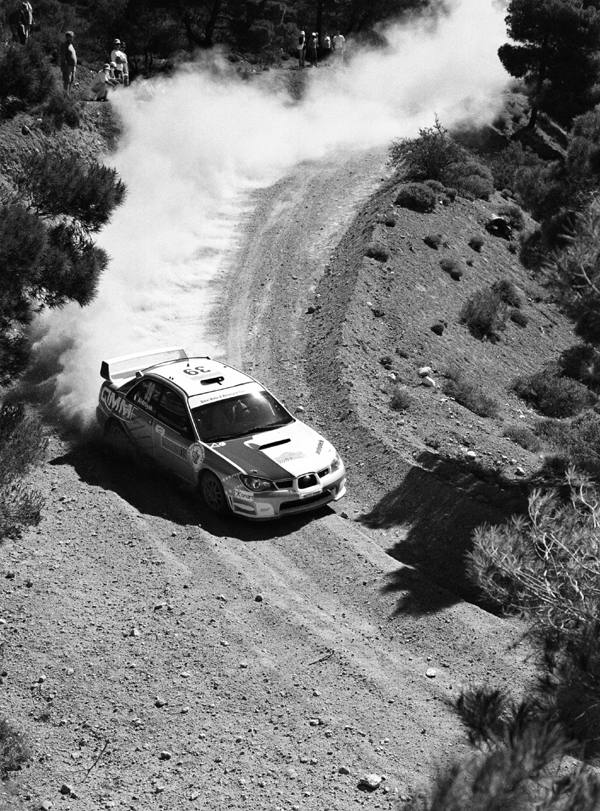
Nasser Al-Attiyah driving a Subaru Impreza WRX STI at the 2006 event.

Year	Driver Co-driver	Car	Championship
1951	(Greece) Petros Peratikos	(Italy) Fiat 1400	
1952	(Greece) Johnny Pesmatzoglou	(United States) Chevrolet Deluxe	(as ELPA Rally)
1953	(Greece) Nikos Papamichail	(United Kingdom) Jaguar XK120	
1954	(Greece) Pétros Papadópoulos	(Germany) Opel Rekord	
1955	(Greece) Johnny Pesmatzoglou	(Germany) Opel Kapitän	
1956	(West Germany) Walter Shock	(Germany) Mercedes-Benz 300 SL	
1957	(France) Jean-Pierre Estager	(Italy) Ferrari 250 GT	
1958	(Italy) Luigi Villoresi	(Italy) Lancia Aurelia B20 GT	
1959	(West Germany) Wolfgang Levy	(Germany) Auto Union 1000	
1960	(West Germany) Walter Shock (West Germany) Rolf Moll	(Germany) Mercedes-Benz 220 SE	ERC
1961	(Sweden) Erik Carlsson (Sweden) Walter Karlsson	(Sweden) Saab 96	ERC
1962	(West Germany) Eugen Böhringer (West Germany) Peter Lang	(Germany) Mercedes-Benz 220 SE	ERC
1963	(West Germany) Eugen Böhringer (West Germany) Rolf Knoll	(Germany) Mercedes-Benz 300 SE	ERC
1964	(Sweden) Tom Trana (Sweden) Gunnar Thermanius	(Sweden) Volvo PV 544	ERC
1965	(Sweden) Carl-Magnus Skogh (Sweden) Lennart Berggren	(Sweden) Volvo Amazon 122S	ERC
1966	(Sweden) Bengt Söderström (Sweden) Gunnar Palm	(United Kingdom) Ford Cortina Lotus	ERC
1967	(United Kingdom) Paddy Hopkirk (United Kingdom) Ron Crellin	(United Kingdom) Mini Cooper S	ERC
1968	(United Kingdom) Roger Clark (United Kingdom) Jim Porter	(United States) Ford Escort Twin Cam	ERC
1969	(Finland) Pauli Toivonen (Finland) Martti Kolari	(Germany) Porsche 911 S	
1970	(France) Jean-Luc Thérier (France) Marcel Callewaert	(France) Alpine-Renault A110 1600	IMC
1971	(Sweden) Ove Andersson (Sweden) Arne Hertz	(France) Alpine-Renault A110 1600	IMC
1972	(Sweden) Håkan Lindberg (Italy) Helmut Eisendle	(Italy) Fiat 124 Sport Spider	IMC
1973	(France) Jean-Luc Thérier (Belgium) Christian Delferrier	(France) Alpine-Renault A110 1800	WRC
1974	Event cancelled due to the oil crisis.		
1975	(West Germany) Walter Röhrl (West Germany) Jochen Berger	(Germany) Opel Ascona 1.9 SR	WRC
1976	(Sweden) Harry Källström (Sweden) Claes-Göran Andersson	(Japan) Datsun Violet 160J	WRC
1977	(Sweden) Björn Waldegård (Sweden) Hans Thorszelius	(United States) Ford Escort RS 1800	WRC
1978	(West Germany) Walter Röhrl (West Germany) Christian Geistdörfer	(Italy) Fiat 131 Abarth	WRC
1979	(Sweden) Björn Waldegård (Sweden) Hans Thorszelius	(United States) Ford Escort RS 1800	WRC
1980	(Finland) Ari Vatanen (United Kingdom) David Richards	(United States) Ford Escort RS 1800	WRC
1981	(Finland) Ari Vatanen (United Kingdom) David Richards	(United States) Ford Escort RS 1800	WRC
1982	(France) Michèle Mouton (Italy) Fabrizia Pons	(Germany) Audi Quattro	WRC
1983	(West Germany) Walter Röhrl (West Germany) Christian Geistdörfer	(Italy) Lancia 037 Rally	WRC
1984	(Sweden) Stig Blomqvist (Sweden) Björn Cederberg	(Germany) Audi Quattro A2	WRC
1985	(Finland) Timo Salonen (Finland) Seppo Harjanne	(France) Peugeot 205 Turbo 16 E2	WRC
1986	(Finland) Juha Kankkunen (Finland) Juha Piironen	(France) Peugeot 205 Turbo 16 E2	WRC
1987	(Finland) Markku Alén (Finland) Ilkka Kivimäki	(Italy) Lancia Delta HF 4WD	WRC
1988	(Italy) Miki Biasion (Italy) Tiziano Siviero	(Italy) Lancia Delta HF Integrale	WRC
1989	(Italy) Miki Biasion (Italy) Tiziano Siviero	(Italy) Lancia Delta HF Integrale	WRC
1990	(Spain) Carlos Sainz (Spain) Luis Moya	(Japan) Toyota Celica GT-Four	WRC
1991	(Finland) Juha Kankkunen (Finland) Juha Piironen	(Italy) Lancia Delta HF Integrale 16v	WRC
1992	(France) Didier Auriol (France) Bernard Occelli	(Italy) Lancia Delta HF Integrale	WRC
1993	(Italy) Miki Biasion (Italy) Tiziano Siviero	(United States) Ford Escort RS Cosworth	WRC
1994	(Spain) Carlos Sainz (Spain) Luis Moya	(Japan) Subaru Impreza 555	WRC
1995	(Greece) Aris Vovos (Greece) Kostas Stefanis	(Italy) Lancia Delta HF Integrale	FIA 2-Litre Cup
1996	(Scotland) Colin McRae (Scotland) Derek Ringer	(Japan) Subaru Impreza 555	WRC
1997	(Spain) Carlos Sainz (Spain) Luis Moya	(United States) Ford Escort WRC	WRC
1998	(Scotland) Colin McRae (Wales) Nicky Grist	(Japan) Subaru Impreza S4 WRC '98	WRC
1999	(England) Richard Burns (Scotland) Robert Reid	(Japan) Subaru Impreza S5 WRC '99	WRC
2000	(Scotland) Colin McRae (Wales) Nicky Grist	(United States) Ford Focus RS WRC 00	WRC
2001	(Scotland) Colin McRae (Wales) Nicky Grist	(United States) Ford Focus RS WRC 01	WRC
2002	(Scotland) Colin McRae (Wales) Nicky Grist	(United States) Ford Focus RS WRC 01	WRC
2003	(Estonia) Markko Märtin (United Kingdom) Michael Park	(United States) Ford Focus RS WRC 03	WRC
2004	(Norway) Petter Solberg (Wales) Phil Mills	(Japan) Subaru Impreza S10 WRC '04	WRC
2005	(France) Sébastien Loeb (Monaco) Daniel Elena	(France) Citroën Xsara WRC	WRC
2006	(Finland) Marcus Grönholm (Finland) Timo Rautiainen	(United States) Ford Focus RS WRC 06	WRC
2007	(Finland) Marcus Grönholm (Finland) Timo Rautiainen	(United States) Ford Focus RS WRC 06	WRC
2008	(France) Sébastien Loeb (Monaco) Daniel Elena	(France) Citroën C4 WRC	WRC
2009	(Finland) Mikko Hirvonen (Finland) Jarmo Lehtinen	(United States) Ford Focus RS WRC 09	WRC
2010	Not held		
2011	(France) Sébastien Ogier (France) Julien Ingrassia	(France) Citroën DS3 WRC	WRC
2012	(France) Sébastien Loeb (Monaco) Daniel Elena	(France) Citroën DS3 WRC	WRC
2013	(Finland) Jari-Matti Latvala (Finland) Miikka Anttila	(Germany) Volkswagen Polo R WRC	WRC
2014	(Republic of Ireland) Craig Breen (United Kingdom) Scott Martin	(France) Peugeot 208 T16 R5	ERC
2015	(Poland) Kajetan Kajetanowicz (Poland) Jarosław Baran	(United States) Ford Fiesta R5	ERC
2016	(Latvia) Ralfs Sirmacis (Latvia) Arturs Šimins	(Czech Republic) Škoda Fabia R5	ERC
2017	(Poland) Kajetan Kajetanowicz (Poland) Jarosław Baran	(United States) Ford Fiesta R5	ERC
2018	(Portugal) Bruno Magalhães (Portugal) Hugo Magalhães	(Czech Republic) Škoda Fabia R5	ERC
2019 and 2020	Not held		
2021	(Finland) Kalle Rovanperä (Finland) Jonne Halttunen	(Japan) Toyota Yaris WRC	WRC
2022	(Belgium) Thierry Neuville (Belgium) Martijn Wydaeghe	(South Korea) Hyundai i20 N Rally1	WRC
2023	(Finland) Kalle Rovanperä (Finland) Jonne Halttunen	(Japan) Toyota GR Yaris Rally1	WRC
2024	(Belgium) Thierry Neuville (Belgium) Martijn Wydaeghe	(South Korea) Hyundai i20 N Rally1	WRC
2025	(Estonia) Ott Tänak (Estonia) Martin Järveoja	(South Korea) Hyundai i20 N Rally1	WRC
2026	(France) Sébastien Ogier (France) Vincent Landais	(Japan) Toyota GR Yaris Rally1	WRC

== Number of victories per driver and manufacturer (WRC only) ==
Since 1973, the first WRC season.

# Wins	Driver (24)	Years won
5	(United Kingdom) Colin McRae	1996, 1998, 2000, 2001, 2002
3	(Germany) Walter Röhrl	1975, 1978, 1983
3	(Italy) Miki Biasion	1988, 1989, 1993
3	(Spain) Carlos Sainz	1990, 1994, 1997
3	(France) Sébastien Loeb	2005, 2008, 2012
2	(Sweden) Björn Waldegård	1977, 1979
2	(Finland) Ari Vatanen	1980, 1981
2	(Finland) Juha Kankkunen	1986, 1991
2	(Finland) Marcus Grönholm	2006, 2007
2	(Finland) Kalle Rovanperä	2021, 2023
2	(Belgium) Thierry Neuville	2022, 2024
2	(France) Sébastien Ogier	2011, 2026
1	(France) Jean-Luc Thérier	1973
1	(Sweden) Harry Källström	1976
1	(France) Michèle Mouton	1982
1	(Sweden) Stig Blomqvist	1984
1	(Finland) Timo Salonen	1985
1	(Finland) Markku Alén	1987
1	(France) Didier Auriol	1992
1	(United Kingdom) Richard Burns	1999
1	(Estonia) Markko Märtin	2003
1	(Norway) Petter Solberg	2004
1	(Finland) Mikko Hirvonen	2009
1	(Finland) Jari-Matti Latvala	2013
1	(Estonia) Ott Tänak	2025

# Wins	Manufacturer (13)	Years won
13	(United States) Ford	1977, 1979, 1980, 1981, 1993, 1997, 2000, 2001, 2002, 2003, 2006, 2007, 2009
6	(Italy) Lancia	1983, 1987, 1988, 1989, 1991, 1992
5	(Japan) Subaru	1994, 1996, 1998, 1999, 2004
4	(France) Citroën	2005, 2008, 2011, 2012
4	(Japan) Toyota	1990, 2021, 2023, 2026
3	(South Korea) Hyundai	2022, 2024, 2025
2	(Germany) Audi	1982, 1984
2	(France) Peugeot	1985, 1986
1	(France) Alpine-Renault	1973
1	(Germany) Opel	1975
1	(Japan) Datsun	1976
1	(Italy) Fiat	1978
1	(Germany) Volkswagen	2013
