= Agios Serafeim =

Agios Serafeim Άγιος Σεραφείμ
- Community
- Location within Greece
- Coordinates: 38°48′N 22°42′E
- Country: Greece
- Administrative region: Central Greece
- Regional unit: Phthiotis
- Municipality: Kamena Vourla
- Municipal unit: Molos

Population (2021)
  - Community: 542
- Time zone: UTC+2 (EET)
  - Summer (DST): UTC+3 (EEST)
- Vehicle registration: ΜΙ

Agios Serafeim (Greek: Άγιος Σεραφείμ meaning Saint Seraphim) is a village in the municipality of Kamena Vourla in Phthiotis, Greece. It is situated near the Malian Gulf coast. Agios Serafeim is 5 km east of Molos, 8 km northwest of the town Kamena Vourla and 14 km northwest of Agios Konstantinos. The A1 motorway (Athens - Thessaloniki) passes south of the village. The area is known for its olive production.

== Historical population ==
Year	Population
1981	738
1991	957
2001	1,039
2011	725
2021	542

== See also ==
- List of settlements in Phthiotis
