= Dionysios of Fourna =

Greek painter and educator (c. 1670 – 1744)

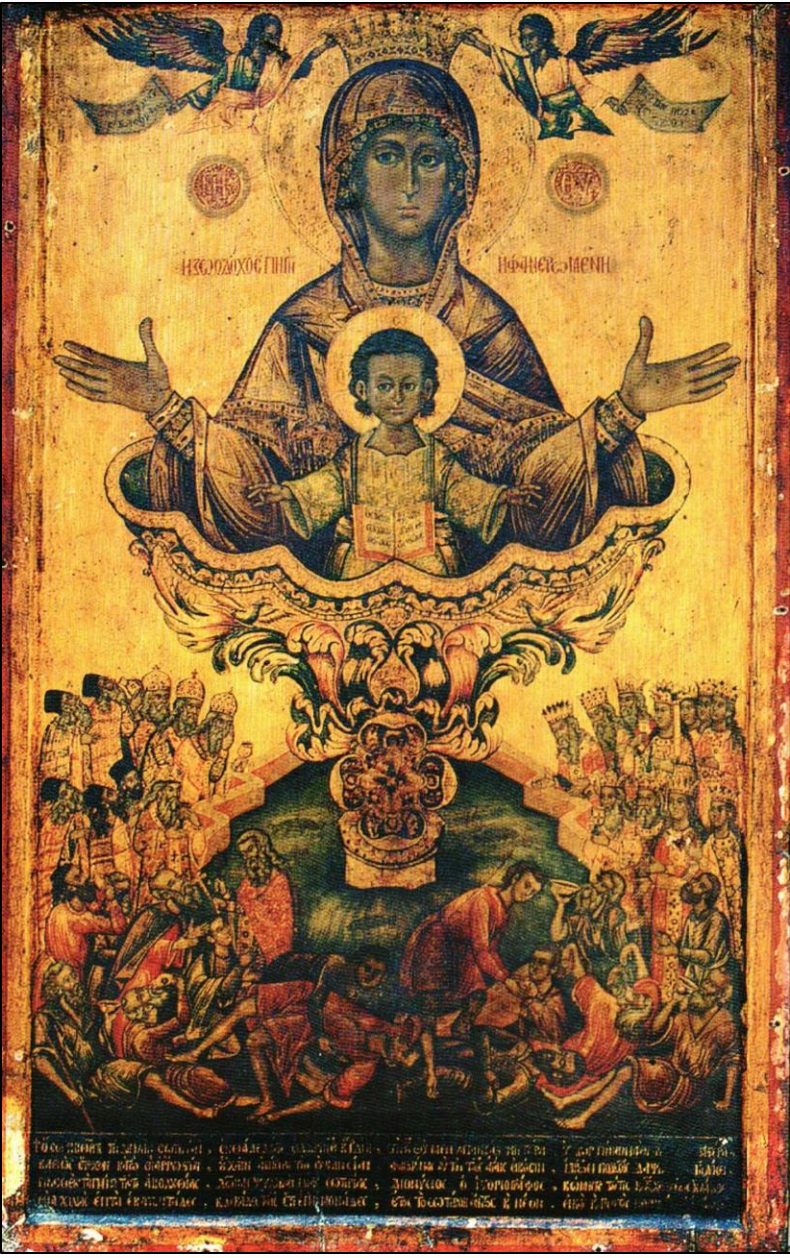
- Virgin and Child on the Monk Pillar
- Born: 1670; Fourna, Greece
- Died: 1744 (aged 73–74); Fourna, Greece
- Occupations: Painter, Monk, Educator, and Author
- Years active: 1685-1744
- Era: 18th Century
- Style: Maniera Greca

Dionysius of Fourna (Greek: Διονύσιος ὁ ἐκ Φουρνᾶς; c. 1670 – after 1744) was an author, educator, painter, and monk. He was one of the most influential painters of the 18th century. He was a monk on the isolated self-autonomous monastery of Mount Athos. He was a self-taught painter. He was exposed to the works of the Cretan school and Heptanese school but choose to paint in the traditional style. His works are a mixture of different styles including the palaeologan renaissance. He was active from 1685 to 1744. According to the Hellenic Institute, two of his fresco and ten of his icons have survived. He was active while the Heptanese school flourished. His contemporary at the time was the painter David both artists belong to a class of their own. His student and coworker was famous Greek painter Kyrillos Foteinos. He was from Chios. Some of his other students were Zacharias Vakos, Agapios and two painters known as Petros. Dionysios was also the author of a famous manual on painting.

== Biography ==
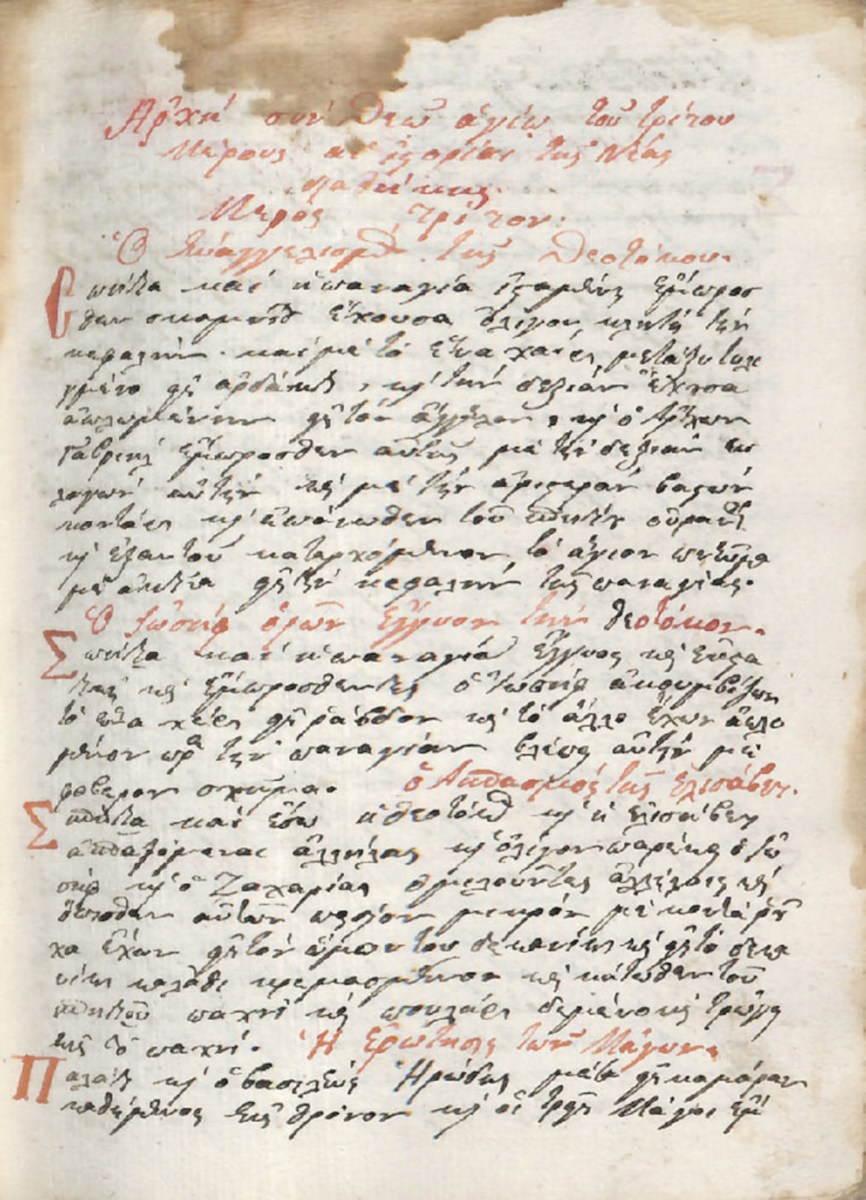
Mount Athos Painter's Guide (1730–1734)

He was born in Fourna, Greece was still part of the Ottoman Empire. His father was a priest named Panagiotis. Dionysio's most incredible characteristic was that he was a self-taught painter. He rejected the art of the Cretan school and the Heptanese school but was exposed to the work while he was on Mount Athos. He preferred the work of Manuel Panselinos. He was considered a traditionalist.

He painted several icons in Mount Athos, although the dates are indistinct (either 1701 or 1711) and at Karyes. In 1721, he painted the chapel of St. Demetrios in Vatopedi. He then returned to live in Fourna. In 1741, he gained permission to start a school at Agrafa. His last official entry in public record was in 1744.

He wrote his manual on painting from 1728 to 1733 with the help of his student Kyrillos Foteinos. The book was widely distributed in the Balkans. Dionysius's famous book Interpretation of Painting Art (Ερμηνεία της Ζωγραφικής Τέχνης) attempts to provide a synthetic (or "harmonized") Gospel account of the life of Jesus Christ. His timeline and events are mainly from the Book of Matthew, but he weaves in major incidents from the other synoptic Gospels. The manual is also called Mount Athos Painter's Guide and is in three parts. In general, it is a chronological listing of scenes appropriate for painting, along with a proper inscription for the painter to include to make the icon, as well as the proper position in the church for each scene. The first part of the work gives recipes for colors, gesso, and instructions on body proportions for human figure painting. The second part is a manual for the life of Christ, descriptions, and inscriptions for various Biblical and hagiographic subjects, and suggested images. The third part describes the locations in a church for each depiction. The manuscript survives in more than twenty-five instances.

It is likely that Dionysius surveyed existing churches from the medieval period, where the life of Christ would be told in emblems around the church. Although the work is not original, nor designed to be original, the description of each scene is probably from Dionysius's own imagination and imagery.

== Gallery ==
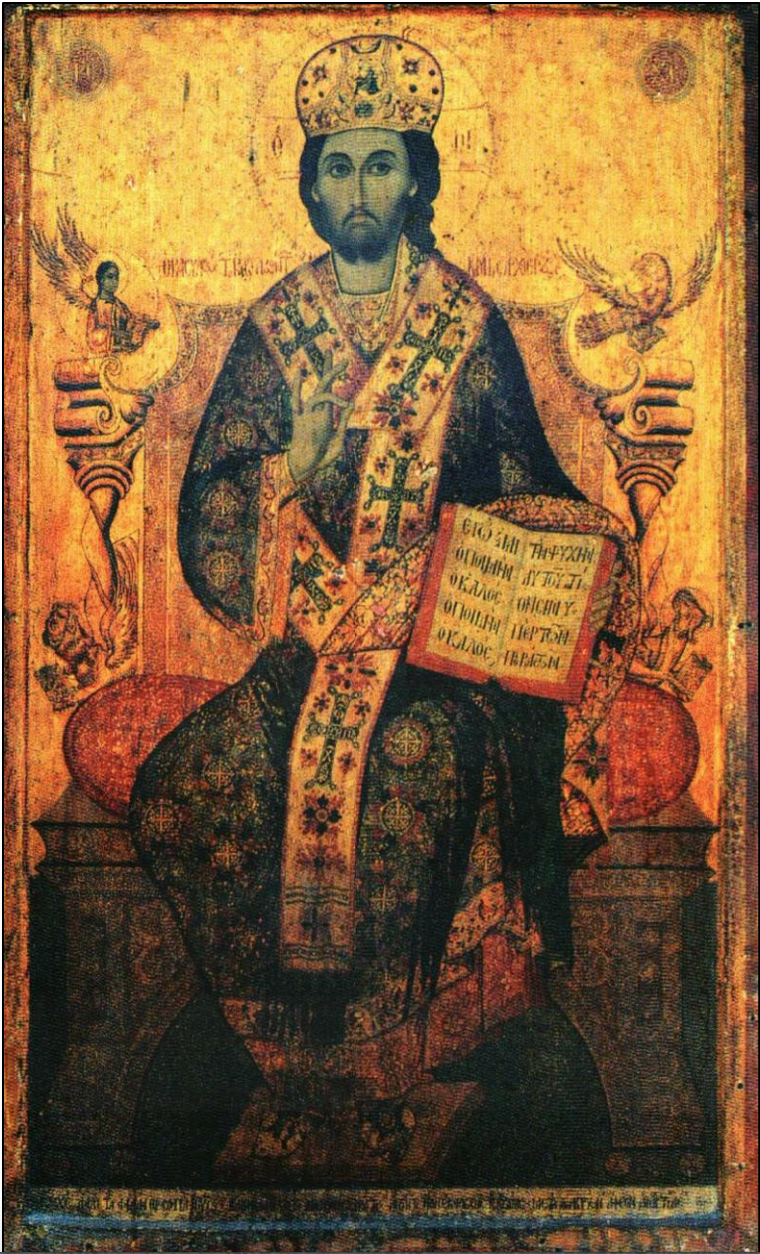
Christ Enthroned

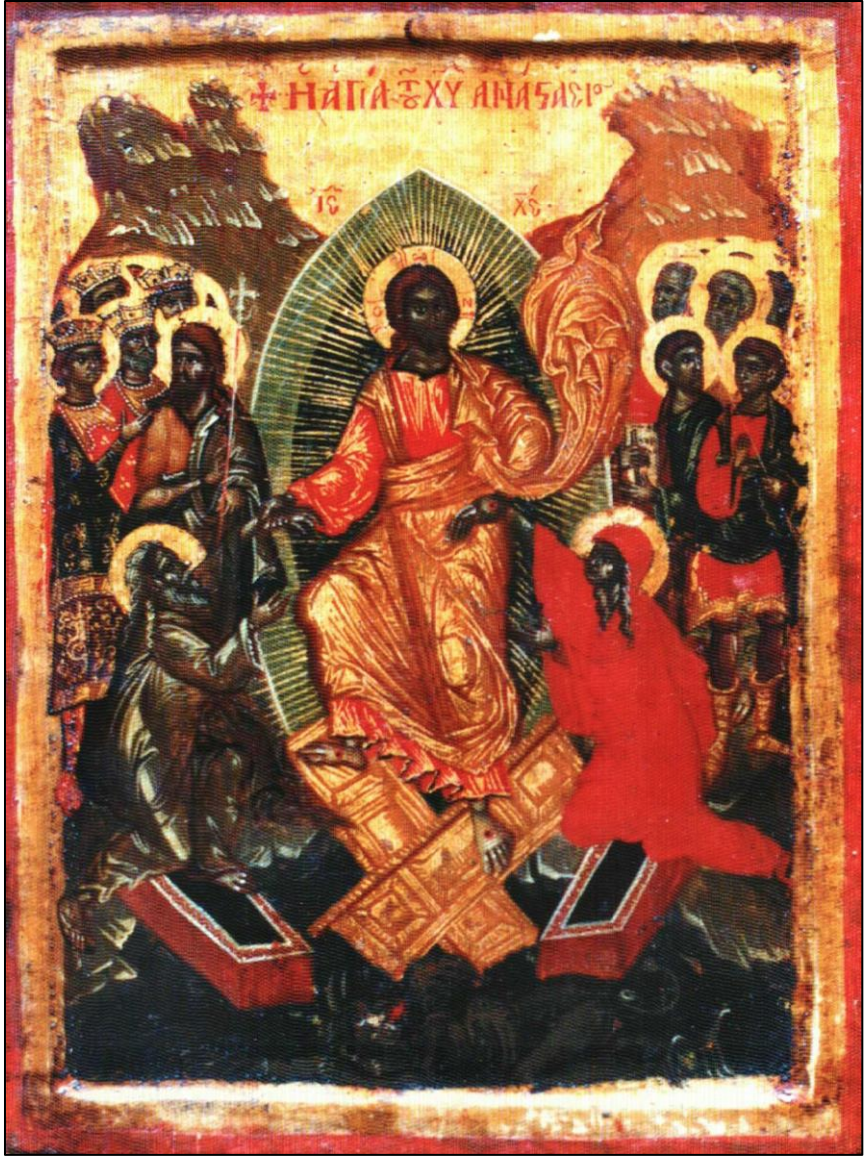
Anastasis Athos

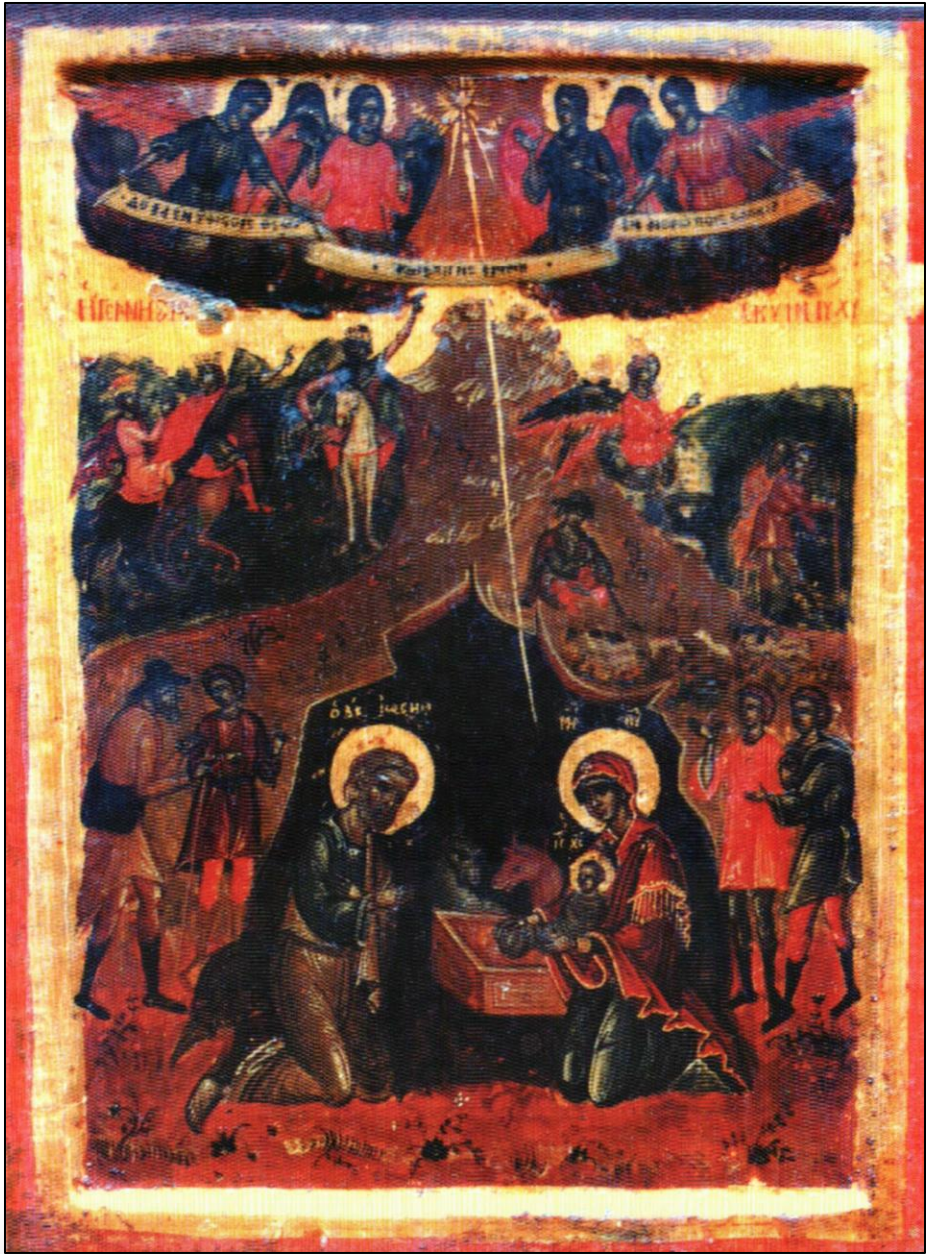
Nativity of Christ Athos

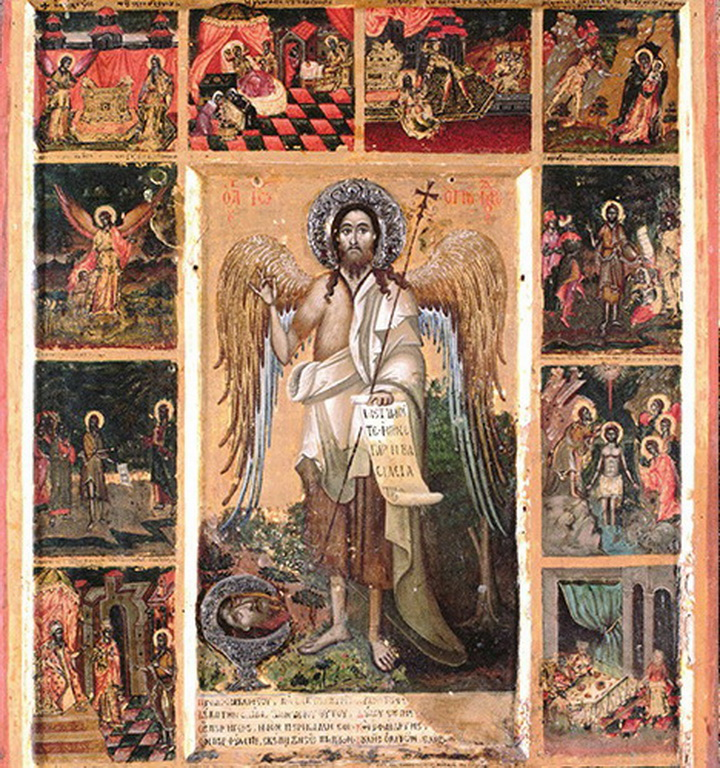
From the Cell of Dionysios at Mount Athos John the Baptist and a Narrative of His Life

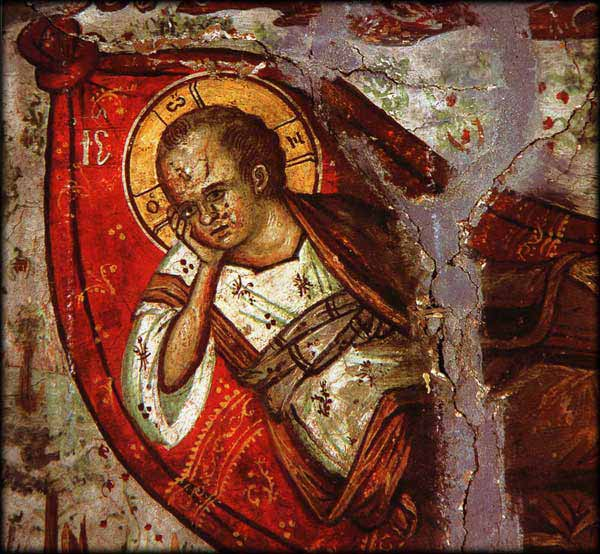
Young Jesus

== Literary works ==
- Interpretation of Painting Art (Ερμηνεία της Ζωγραφικής Τέχνης)

== Bibliography ==
- Hatzidakis, Manolis (1987). Έλληνες Ζωγράφοι μετά την Άλωση (1450-1830). Τόμος 1: Αβέρκιος - Ιωσήφ [Greek Painters after the Fall of Constantinople (1450-1830). Volume 1: Averkios - Iosif]. Athens: Center for Modern Greek Studies, National Research Foundation. hdl:10442/14844. ISBN 960-7916-01-8.
- Hatzidakis, Manolis; Drakopoulou, Evgenia (1997). Έλληνες Ζωγράφοι μετά την Άλωση (1450-1830). Τόμος 2: Καβαλλάρος - Ψαθόπουλος [Greek Painters after the Fall of Constantinople (1450-1830). Volume 2: Kavallaros - Psathopoulos]. Athens: Center for Modern Greek Studies, National Research Foundation. hdl:10442/14088. ISBN 960-7916-00-X.
- Brubaker, Leslie. "Dionysius of Fourna" in Strayer, Joseph R. ed. Dictionary of the Middle Ages. New York: Charles Scribner's Sons, 1984. vol. 4, pp 191–2.
- Van Ginkel, J., Paul Hetherington, and A. N. Palmer. "Dionysius of Fourna" in Turner, Jane ed. The Grove Dictionary of Art. New York: Grove Dictionaries, 1996. vol. 18, p. 910.
- (in Greek) The Greek text of the 'Interpretation of Painting Art (Ερμηνεία της Ζωγραφικής Τέχνης)', edited by Papadopoulos-Karemeos, 1909
- (in French) French translation of the 'Painter's Manual', edited by Didron, 1845
