= Tsoukka =

Tsoukka Τσούκκα
- Community
- A bell tower near the Tsoukka central park

- Location within Greece
- Coordinates: 38°57.4′N 22°3.6′E
- Country: Greece
- Administrative region: Central Greece
- Regional unit: Phthiotis
- Municipality: Makrakomi
- Municipal unit: Makrakomi
- Elevation: 580 m (1,900 ft)

Population (2021)
  - Community: 356
- Time zone: UTC+2 (EET)
  - Summer (DST): UTC+3 (EEST)
- Postal code: 350 11
- Website: https://tsoukka.blogspot.com/

Tsoukka is a semi-mountainous village in western Phthiotis, 38 kilometers from Lamia. It is situated at an elevation of 580 meters in a location with a panoramic view of the entire plain of Phthiotis.

Tsoukka is known for its traditional festival (August 28–30) and for its hunting grounds, where many species of game can be found, such as wild boar, hares, foxes, partridges, woodcocks, turtle doves, and quail, among others. It is also renowned for its traditional coffeehouses and taverns, as well as for its local lamb, wine, and tsipouro, oregano, and vegetables. From 1978 to 1986, the Acropolis Rally took place near the village, and more recently, the “MOUNTAIN CLASSIC RALLY”.

== Local Community of Tsoukkas ==
The village of Tsoukka, which has 356 permanent residents, and the settlement of Papadeika make up the Municipal Community of Tsoukka, with a total population of 378 residents according to the 2021 Census.

== History ==
The exact date of the village’s founding is unknown, but it must certainly have been before 1741—a date that is carved into a stone wall of the Church of St. George and which most likely refers to the date of its construction.

The first known census of the population was conducted pursuant to the Royal Decree of August 29, 1912, as published in the Government Gazette A 261/1912.

== Notable Areas - Attractions ==
- Church of Agios Georgios:The Church of Agios Georgios (Saint George) is notable for its hagiographies, which were painted in 1885 by the Epirote painter Ioannis Mattheou.
- Cross of Cosmas the Aetolian: Located near the entrance of the village in the Stavros area, there is a small stone chapel and a tree with an old iron cross embedded in its trunk. This marks the site where Cosmas the Aetolian preached during the 18th century.
- Prophet Elias Hill: The Church of Prophet Elias is situated on a dominant hill overlooking the village at an altitude of 710 meters. Lower down the hill lies the oak-forested area of Kri, followed by the newly built Church of Agia Paraskevi.
- Tsoukka's Refuge: Located in the Livadia area at an altitude of 772 meters, this refuge provides basic survival supplies for individuals who may become stranded during severe weather conditions.
- Church of Agios Ioannis: Situated at the entrance of the village at an altitude of 487 meters, this church features a natural spring and a courtyard flanked by centuries-old oak trees.
- Estate of Georgios Liaskonis: Located along the Makrakomi–Tsouka road in the Chalkia Gourna area, this estate hosts the Church of the Panagia (Virgin Mary). An annual Divine Liturgy and cultural celebrations take place here on August 15th.

== Hiking and outdoor areas ==
The area surrounding the village offers numerous destinations for walking and hiking, including: Vrises,Nyfis Kotroni,Kri,Profitis Ilias,Karaoulia, Trani Vrisi, Pipilia,Livadia (Refuge),Strangeio,Therma,Agios Ioannis,Chalkia Gourna,Koutsomilia,Kavrorema

== See also ==
- List of settlements in Phthiotis
