= Goura, Phthiotis =

Goura, Phthiotis was a village located within Phthiotis, Greece. Sometime around the late 19th century, a beehive tomb burial structure constructed from stone was discovered in Goura. Local people converted the tomb into a lime kiln, and it contained rings, gold, silver, painted vases and bones.

== See also ==
- List of settlements in Phthiotis
