= Amouri, Pthiotis =

Amouri Αμούρι
- Community
- Location within Greece
- Coordinates: 38°54′N 22°20′E
- Country: Greece
- Administrative region: Central Greece
- Regional unit: Phthiotis
- Municipality: Lamia
- Municipal unit: Leianokladi

Area
  - Community: 6.901 km^{2} (2.664 sq mi)
- Elevation: 40 m (130 ft)

Population (2021)
  - Community: 164
  - Density: 23.8/km^{2} (61.6/sq mi)
- Time zone: UTC+2 (EET)
  - Summer (DST): UTC+3 (EEST)
- Postal code: 351 00
- Area code: +30-2231
- Vehicle registration: MI

Amouri (Greek: Αμούρι, Greek pronunciation: [a'muɾi]) is a village and a community of the Lamia municipality. Before the 2011 local government reform it was a part of the municipality of Leianokladi, of which it was a municipal district. The community of Amouri covers an area of 6.901 km^{2} (2.664 sq mi).

== Population ==
Historical population
Year	Pop.	±%
2001	381	—
2011	278	−27.0%
2021	164	−41.0%

== See also ==
- List of settlements in Phthiotis
