= Domokos railway station =

Railway station in Central Greece

Δομοκός Domokos

General information
- Location: 350 10 Domokos; Phthiotis; Greece
- Coordinates: 39°10′44″N 22°17′12″E
- Owner: GAIAOSE
- Line: Piraeus–Platy railway
- Platforms: 2
- Tracks: 3
- Train operators: Hellenic Train

Construction
- Structure type: at-grade
- Parking: No
- Cycle facilities: No

Other information
- Website: http://www.ose.gr/en/

History
- Opened: 8 March 1904; 122 years ago
- Electrified: 25 kV 50 Hz AC

Services
Preceding station	Hellenic Train	Following station
Angeies towards Athens	C2 Athens-Kalambaka	Palaiofarsalos towards Kalambaka
Location
- Location within Greece

Domokos railway station (Greek: Σιδηροδρομικός σταθμός Δομοκού) is a railway station, 3 kilometres (1.9 mi) from Pournari and 5 kilometres (3.1 mi) from Domokos in Phthiotis regional unit, Central Greece. It is also located close to a small settlement (also called Domokos Station) which, according to the 2001 census had a population of 4 inhabitants. The station is served by intercity trains between Athens and Thessaloniki.

== History ==
The station opened on 8 March 1904.. In 1920 Hellenic State Railways or SEK was established, and the line became part of the network. During the Axis occupation of Greece (1941–44), Athens was controlled by German military forces, and the line was used for the transport of troops and weapons. During the occupation (and especially during the German withdrawal in 1944), the network was severely damaged by both the German army and Greek resistance groups. The track and rolling stock replacement took time following the civil war, with normal service levels resumed around 1948.

In 1970 OSE became the legal successor to the SEK, taking over responsibilities for most of Greece's rail infrastructure. On 1 January 1971, the station and most of the Greek rail infrastructure were transferred to the Hellenic Railways Organisation S.A., a state-owned corporation. Freight traffic declined sharply when the state-imposed monopoly of OSE for the transport of agricultural products and fertilisers ended in the early 1990s. Many small stations of the network with little passenger traffic were closed down, especially on the mainline section and between Karditsa and Kalampaka. In 2001 the section between Kalampaka and Palaiofarsalos was converted from Narrow gauge (1000 mm) to standard gauge (1435 mm) and physically connected at Palaiofarsalos with the mainline from Athens to Thessaloniki. Since to upgrade; however, travel times improved and the unification of rail gauge allowed direct services, even InterCity services, to link Volos and Kalambaka with Athens and Thessaloniki.

In 2001 the infrastructure element of OSE was created, known as GAIAOSE. It would henceforth be responsible for the maintenance of stations, bridges and other elements of the network, as well as the leasing and the sale of railway assets. In 2005, TrainOSE was created as a brand within OSE to concentrate on rail services and passenger interfaces. In 2009, with the Greek debt crisis unfolding OSE's Management was forced to reduce services across the network. Timetables were cut back, and routes closed as the government-run entity attempted to reduce overheads. In 2015 a 15-year-old child was airlifted to hospital after being electrocuted at the station. In 2017 OSE's passenger transport sector was privatised as TrainOSE, currently, a wholly owned subsidiary of Ferrovie dello Stato Italiane infrastructure, including stations, remained under the control of OSE. In July 2022, the station began being served by Hellenic Train, the rebranded TranOSE

On the 5 September 2023, Storm Daniel triggered largescale flooding in Thessaly. The rail infrastructure was badly affected in the region, cutting on both Regional and Intercity routes as significant parts of the infrastructure were washed away. OSE engineers were on the ground in the worst affected areas, such as Domokos to assess the extent of the damage, and prepare detailed reports, and seek financial assistance from the European Union. 50 km (31 mi) of tracks was completely destroyed Repairing the extensive damage, was estimated at between 35 and 45 million euros. OSE managing director, Panagiotis Terezakis, spoke of reconstruction works reaching 50 million euros, confirming at the same time that there will be no rail traffic in the effected sections of the network for at least a month. The devastation goes beyond the tracks and signalling, affecting costly equipment such as the European Train Control System (ETCS), which enhances rail safety. In November 2023, rail services resumed between Larissa and Rapsani With Through services from Athens to Thessaloniki recommencing on 16 December 2023.

In August 2025, the Greek Ministry of Infrastructure and Transport confirmed the creation of a new body, Greek Railways (Greek: Σιδηρόδρομοι Ελλάδος, romanized: Ellinikí Sidiródromi Monoprósopi) to assume responsibility for rail infrastructure, planning, modernisation projects, and rolling stock across Greece. Previously, these functions were divided among several state-owned entities: OSE, which managed infrastructure; ERGOSÉ, responsible for modernisation projects; and GAIAOSÉ, which owned stations, buildings, and rolling stock. OSE had overseen both infrastructure and operations until its vertical separation in 2005. Rail safety has been identified as a key priority. The merger follows the July approval of a Parliamentary Bill to restructure the national railway system, a direct response to the Tempi accident of February 2023, in which 43 people died after a head-on collision.

== Facilities ==
Currently, the station is undergoing a massive refurbishment and will be delivered simultaneously with the Lianokladi-Domokos section of the new Tithorea–Domokos high-speed rail line. The upgrade will include a lift, underground passageway, shelters and lighting on the platforms.

== Services ==
The station is served by intercity trains between Athens and Thessaloniki.
