= Automobile and Touring Club of Greece =

Defunct Greek motor sports organisation

- Abbreviation: ELPA
- Founded: 1926
- Affiliation date: 1927

Official website
- www.elpa.gr
- (Greece)

The Automobile and Touring Club of Greece (Greek: Ελληνική Λέσχη Περιηγήσεων και Αυτοκινήτου (ΕΛΠΑ), Elliniki Leschi Periigiseon kai Aftokinitou, ELPA) was a Greek motor sports organisation which organized every racing event in Greece, including the world famous Acropolis Rally.

Founded in 1926 and was a member of the International Automobile Federation (FIA) and the International Federation of Motorcycling (FIM) since 1927, ELPA services Greek and foreign motorists inside and outside Greece. Before World War II, ELPA had undertaken putting up traffic signs along the Greek road network, an effort financed from its own funds and continued until 1957, when the Greek Government undertook this responsibility. ELPA is also actively engaged in the tourist services sector, providing information and publishing maps - the first road maps of Greece were created by the ELPA.

From its early years, ELPA has been involved in organizing national and international car and motorcycle races. The most prominent of these, was the annual Acropolis Rally, which started in 1952 and provided a major boost to Greek tourism.

Since 1993, the racing department of ELPA has supported the National Special Olympics Team, especially the cycling team.

ELPA is reported to be now defunct,
