= Christos Panagioulas =

Greek politician

Christos Panagioulas (Greek: Χρίστος Παναγιούλας; Domokos, 1882 – ?) was a Greek politician.

== Biography ==
He was born in Domokos, and was the son of Athanasios Panagioulas. He studied law in the University of Athens.

He was elected member of parliament with People's Party in the 1933 election and was reelected, as member of parliament of Phthiotis-Phocis with PP in the 1946 election, and, as member of parliament of Domokos, with Greek Rally, in the 1952 election.
