= Thessaliotida =

Thessaliotida Θεσσαλιώτιδα
- Municipal unit
- Location within the regional unit

- Location within Greece
- Coordinates: 39°14′N 22°16′E
- Country: Greece
- Administrative region: Central Greece
- Regional unit: Phthiotis
- Municipality: Domokos

Area
  - Municipal unit: 155.0 km^{2} (59.8 sq mi)

Population (2021)
  - Municipal unit: 2,622
  - Municipal unit density: 16.92/km^{2} (43.81/sq mi)
- Time zone: UTC+2 (EET)
  - Summer (DST): UTC+3 (EEST)
- Vehicle registration: ΜΙ

Thessaliotida (Greek: Θεσσαλιώτιδα) is a former municipality in Phthiotis, Greece. Since the 2011 local government reform it is part of the municipality Domokos, of which it is a municipal unit. The municipal unit has an area of 155.004 km^{2}. Population 2,622 (2021). The seat of the municipality was in Neo Monastiri. The municipality was named after Thessaliotis, an ancient district of Thessaly region.
