= Achladi =

Achladi Αχλάδι
- Community
- Location within Greece
- Coordinates: 38°53′16″N 22°48′30″E
- Country: Greece
- Administrative region: Central Greece
- Regional unit: Phthiotis
- Municipality: Stylida
- Municipal unit: Echinaioi

Population (2021)
  - Community: 311
- Time zone: UTC+2 (EET)
  - Summer (DST): UTC+3 (EEST)

Achladi (Greek: Αχλάδι) is a village near the town of Stylida, in Phthiotis Prefecture, Central Greece. It forms part of the municipal unit of Echinaioi, in the municipality of Stylida. According to the 2021 census, its population was 311.

A hill north of the village shows traces of medieval fortifications; the castle wall mostly survived until World War II, after which it was mined for building material by the locals. The castle evidently served to control sea traffic in the Malian Gulf and the North Euboean Gulf, and had visual contact to the castle of Lithada on the island of Euboea.

== Sources ==
- Koder, Johannes; Hild, Friedrich (1976). Tabula Imperii Byzantini, Band 1: Hellas und Thessalia (in German). Vienna: Verlag der Österreichischen Akademie der Wissenschaften. ISBN 3-7001-0182-1.
