= Neo Monastiri, Phthiotis =

Village in Central Greece

Neo Monastiri Νέο Μοναστήρι
- Community
- Location within Greece
- Coordinates: 39°14′24″N 22°16′30″E
- Country: Greece
- Administrative region: Central Greece
- Regional unit: Phthiotis
- Municipality: Domokos
- Municipal unit: Thessaliotida

Population (2021)
  - Community: 904
- Time zone: UTC+2 (EET)
  - Summer (DST): UTC+3 (EEST)

Neo Monastiri (Greek: Νέο Μοναστήρι, before 1927: Τσιόμπα - Tsiomba) is a village and a community of the municipality of Domokos in Phthiotis, Greece. Its residents are mostly refugees from Eastern Rumelia. According to the 2021 census there are 904 residents in Neo Monastiri. It was the seat of the former municipality Thessaliotida.

== Culture ==
Many events are made to preserve cultural tradition. The main event is at the New Year, where inhabitants engage in a traditional North Thracian dance.
