= Fourna =

Fourna Φουρνά
- Municipal unit
- Location within the regional unit

- Location within Greece
- Coordinates: 39°04′N 21°53′E
- Country: Greece
- Administrative region: Central Greece
- Regional unit: Evrytania
- Municipality: Karpenisi

Area
  - Municipal unit: 132.23 km^{2} (51.05 sq mi)

Population (2021)
  - Municipal unit: 589
  - Municipal unit density: 4.45/km^{2} (11.5/sq mi)
  - Community: 304
- Time zone: UTC+2 (EET)
  - Summer (DST): UTC+3 (EEST)
- Vehicle registration: ΚΗ

Fourna (Greek: Φουρνά) is a village and a former municipality in Evrytania in central Greece. Since the 2011 local government reform it is part of the municipality Karpenisi, of which it is a municipal unit. The municipal unit has an area of 132.232 km^{2}. The population of the municipal unit is 589 (2021 census). The municipal unit consists of the villages Fourna, Vracha (Greek: Βράχα), and Kleisto (Greek: Κλειστό).

== Notable people ==
- Dionysius (c. 1670 – after 1744), painter and monk
