= Agia Sotira =

Agia Sotira Αγία Σωτήρα
- Community
- Location within Greece
- Coordinates: 40°12′10″N 21°11′10″E
- Country: Greece
- Administrative region: Western Macedonia
- Regional unit: Kozani
- Municipality: Voio
- Municipal unit: Pentalofos

Population (2021)
  - Community: 12
- Time zone: UTC+2 (EET)
  - Summer (DST): UTC+3 (EEST)

Agia Sotira (Greek: Αγία Σωτήρα, before 1927: Σβόλιανη – Svoliani), is a village in the municipal unit of Pentalofos, Kozani regional unit, Greece. From Agia Sotira has heritage the professional basketball player Zach Auguste.

Pre–war and post–war immigration from Agia Sotira led to the formation of a diaspora and most of the village population lives abroad in the northern suburbs of Melbourne in Australia.
