= Domokos =

Domokos Δομοκός
- Municipality
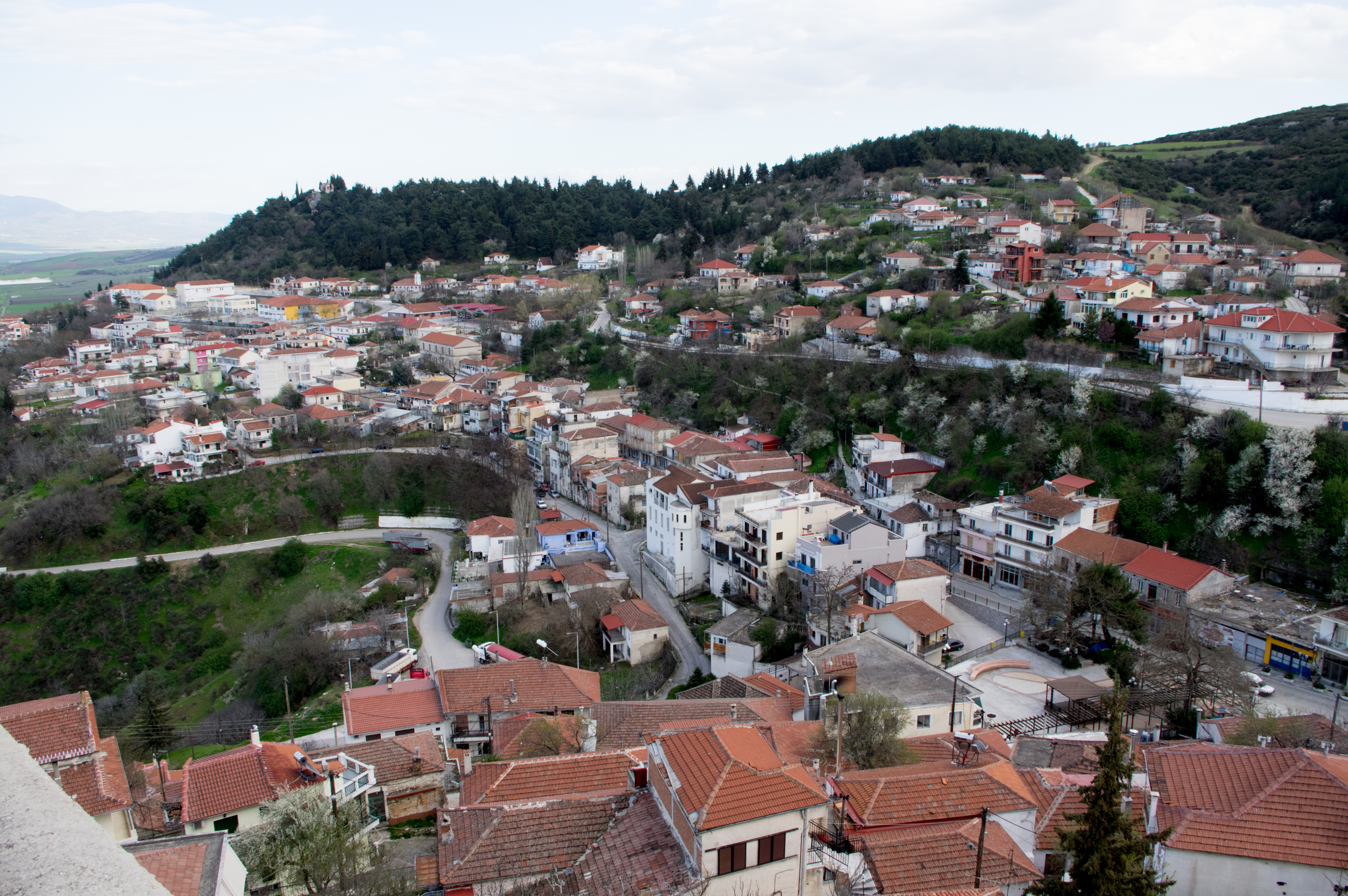
- Domokos

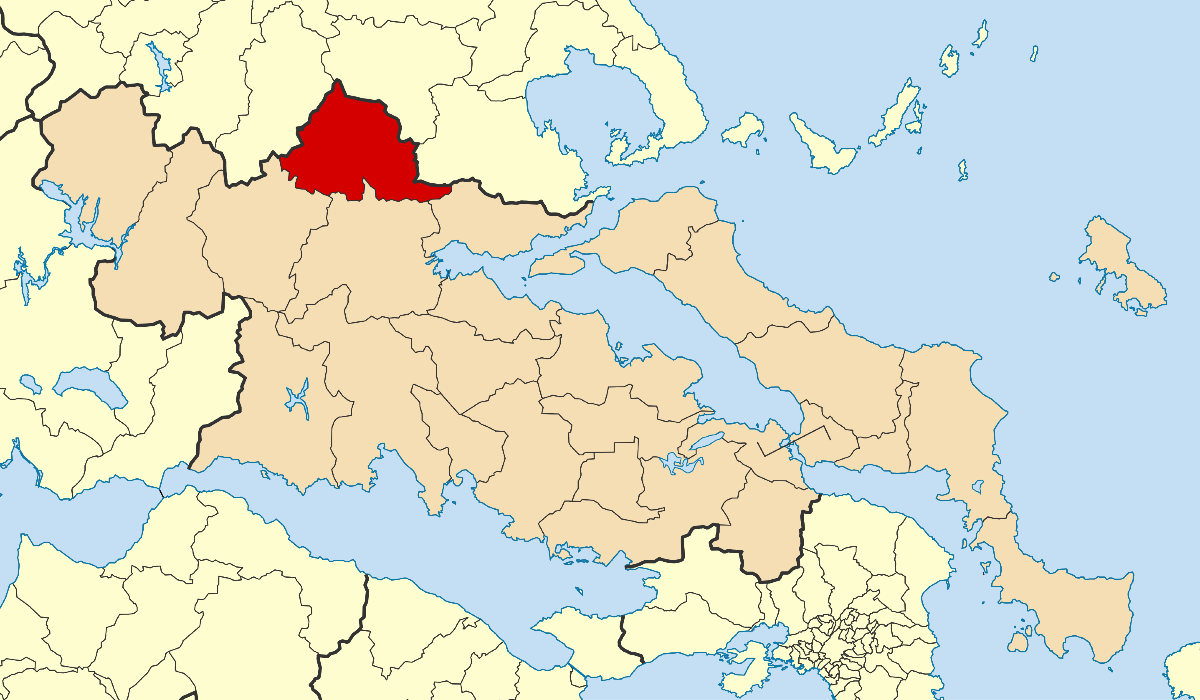

- Location within Greece
- Coordinates: 39°08′N 22°18′E
- Country: Greece
- Administrative region: Central Greece
- Regional unit: Phthiotis

Area
  - Municipality: 707.95 km^{2} (273.34 sq mi)
  - Municipal unit: 346.13 km^{2} (133.64 sq mi)

Population (2021)
  - Municipality: 9,159
  - Density: 12.94/km^{2} (33.51/sq mi)
  - Municipal unit: 4,273
  - Municipal unit density: 12.35/km^{2} (31.97/sq mi)
  - Community: 1,814
- Time zone: UTC+2 (EET)
  - Summer (DST): UTC+3 (EEST)
- Vehicle registration: ΜΙ

Domokos (Greek: Δομοκός), the ancient Thaumacus or Thaumace (Θαυμακός, Θαυμάκη), is a town and a municipality in Phthiotis, Greece. The town Domokos is the seat of the municipality of Domokos and of the former Domokos Province. The town is built on a mountain slope overlooking the plain of Thessaly, 38 km from the city of Lamia.

== History ==
=== Ottoman Era ===
In 1521 (Hijri 927) the town, known in Ottoman Turkish as Dömeke, had six Muslim and 311 Christian households in nine neighborhoods. The castle of the town is mentioned as Dimoko in the Seyahatnâme of Evliya Çelebi, which he visited in 1668. He mentions that there were around a hundred tiled houses, with Muslims constituting only one neighborhood and having a mosque, and that the inner castle was inhabited by the Greeks since the beginning of the Ottoman conquest. He points out that the Muslims are mixed with Christians and are unaware of their denomination, and that they are relieved of paying the haraç tax. He also mentioned the antisemitism of the town, saying that "they do not allow Jews in this city, and the Jews do not come out of fear".

=== Modern ===
The area of Domokos became part of Greece in 1881 when the Ottoman Empire ceded Thessaly and a few adjacent areas to Greece. Until 1899, it was part of the Larissa Prefecture.

=== Battle of Domokos ===
In 1897, during the Greco-Turkish War, about 2,000 Italian volunteers under the command of Giuseppe Garibaldi's son, Ricciotti Garibaldi, helped the Greeks in the Battle of Domokos. Among them there was also a member of the Italian Parliament, Antonio Fratti, who died in the fighting. The Turkish Army was victorious over the Greek Army.

== Transport ==
The town is served by Domokos railway station on the Piraeus–Platy Mainline, which is located 5 km from the city and serves the surrounding area.

You can also visit the town via frequent buses that pass by the town.

== Municipality ==
The municipality Domokos was formed during the 2011 local government reforms by the merger of the following 3 former municipalities, that became municipal units:

- Domokos
- Thessaliotida
- Xyniada

The municipality has an area of 707.953 km^{2}, the municipal unit 346.129 km^{2}.

== Province ==
The province of Domokos (Greek: Επαρχία Δομοκού) was one of the provinces of Phthiotis. It had the same territory as the present municipality. It was abolished in 2006.

== Notable people ==
- Christos Panagioulas (b. 1882), politician
