= List of settlements in Attica =

This is a list of settlements in the region of Attica, Greece.

== Mainland Attica ==
- Acharnes
- Afidnes
- Agia Paraskevi
- Agia Varvara
- Agioi Anargyroi
- Agios Dimitrios
- Agios Ioannis Rentis
- Agios Konstantinos
- Agios Stefanos
- Aigaleo
- Alimos
- Amarousio
- Anavyssos
- Ano Liosia
- Anoixi
- Anthousa
- Argyroupoli
- Artemida
- Aspropyrgos
- Athens
- Avlonas
- Chaidari
- Chalandri
- Cholargos
- Dafni
- Dionysos
- Drapetsona
- Drosia
- Ekali
- Eleusis
- Elliniko
- Erythres
- Filothei
- Fyli
- Galatsi
- Gerakas
- Glyfada
- Glyka Nera
- Grammatiko
- Ilion
- Ilioupoli
- Irakleio
- Kaisariani
- Kalamos
- Kallithea
- Kalyvia Thorikou
- Kamatero
- Kapandriti
- Keratea
- Keratsini
- Kifisia
- Korydallos
- Kouvaras
- Kropia
- Kryoneri
- Lavreotiki
- Lykovrysi
- Magoula
- Malakasa
- Mandra
- Marathon
- Markopoulo Mesogaias
- Markopoulo Oropou
- Megara
- Melissia
- Metamorfosi
- Moschato
- Nea Chalkidona
- Nea Erythraia
- Nea Filadelfeia
- Nea Ionia
- Nea Makri
- Nea Palatia
- Nea Penteli
- Nea Peramos
- Nea Smyrni
- Neo Psychiko
- Nikaia
- Oinoi
- Oropos
- Paiania
- Palaia Fokaia
- Palaio Faliro
- Pallini
- Papagou
- Pefki
- Penteli
- Perama
- Peristeri
- Petroupoli
- Pikermi
- Piraeus
- Polydendri
- Psychiko
- Rafina
- Rodopoli
- Saronida
- Skala Oropou
- Spata-Loutsa
- Stamata
- Sykamino
- Tavros
- Thrakomakedones
- Vari
- Varnavas
- Vgethi
- Vilia
- Voula
- Vouliagmeni
- Vrilissia
- Vyronas
- Ymittos
- Zefyri
- Zografou

== Islands and Troizinia ==
- Aegina
- Aianteio
- Ampelakia
- Agkistri
- Ano Fanari
- Antikythera
- Aroniadika
- Cythera
- Dryopi
- Fratsia
- Friligkianika
- Galatas
- Hydra
- Karatzas
- Karavas
- Karvounades
- Kontolianika
- Kounoupitsa
- Kypseli, Aegina
- Kypseli, Methana
- Livadi
- Logothetianika
- Megalochori
- Mesagros
- Methana
- Mitata
- Mylopotamos
- Myrtidia
- Perdika
- Poros
- Potamos
- Salamina (city)
- Selinia
- Spetses
- Taktikoupoli
- Troizina
- Vathy

== See also ==
- List of towns and villages in Greece
