= Athens metropolitan area =

Main metropolitan area in Greece

- Interactive map of Athens metropolitan area
- Coordinates: 37°59′03″N 23°43′41″E
- Geographic region: Central Greece
- Administrative region: Attica

Area
  - Metro: 2,929 km^{2} (1,131 sq mi)
- Highest elevation: 1,413 m (4,636 ft)
- Lowest elevation: 0 m (0 ft)

Population (2021)
  - Metro: 3,638,281
  - Metro density: 1,242/km^{2} (3,217/sq mi)
- Time zone: UTC+2 (EET)
  - Summer (DST): UTC+3 (EEST)
- Telephone: 21
- Vehicle registration: Yxx, Zxx, Ixx
- Major airport(s): Athens International Airport

The Athens metropolitan area (Greek: Μητροπολιτική Περιοχή της Αθήνας) spans 2,928.717 km^{2} (1,131 sq mi) within the Attica region and consists of 58 municipalities plus parts of East Attica and West Attica, having reached a population of 3,638,281 according to the 2021 census. The municipalities of Athens and Piraeus both serve as the two metropolitan centres of the Athens metropolitan area.

According to the Hellenic Telecommunications and Post Commission, the Athens metropolitan area consists of all areas with a dialing code of 21 and includes areas such as Salamina, Elefsina, Kifissia, Mandra, Magoula, Aspropyrgos, Pallini, Agios Stefanos, Dionysos, Parnitha, Koropi, Vari, Vouliagmeni, Voula and the Athens International Airport.

== Administration ==
The Athens Urban Area, also known as Greater Athens, consists of 40 municipalities, 35 of which make up what was referred to as the former Athens Prefecture municipalities, located within 4 regional units (North Athens, West Athens, Central Athens, South Athens); and a further 5 municipalities, which make up the former Piraeus Prefecture municipalities, located within the regional unit of Piraeus. The Athens Municipality forms the core and centre of Greater Athens, which in turn consists of the Athens Municipality and 40 more municipalities, divided into four regional units, accounting for 2,611,713 people (in 2021) within an area of 361 km^{2} (139 sq mi). The regional units of Central, North, South, and West Athens, Piraeus and parts of East and West Attica regional units combined make up the continuous Athens Urban Area.

=== Athens-Piraeus urban area municipalities ===
This is a list of the main municipalities as well as municipal units which comprise the main bulk of the Athens-Piraeus urban area (dark red):

Municipality	Municipal units	Population (2021)	Area (km²)	Density per km²	Regional unit
Athens		643,452	39	16,499	Central Athens
Dafni-Ymittos	Dafni	23,431	1.375	17,040	Central Athens
Dafni-Ymittos	Ymittos	10,455	0.975	10,700	Central Athens
Galatsi		57,909	4.026	14,477	Central Athens
Ilioupoli		76,730	12.7	6,042	Central Athens
Kaisariani		26,269	7.8	3,368	Central Athens
Nea Filadelfeia-Nea Chalkidona	Nea Filadelfeia	25,198	2.850	8,841	Central Athens
Nea Filadelfeia-Nea Chalkidona	Nea Chalkidona	9,760	0.800	12,200	Central Athens
Vyronas		59,134	9.2	6,428	Central Athens
Zografou		69,874	8.5	8,220	Central Athens
Agia Paraskevi		62,147	7.9	7,867	North Athens
Chalandri		77,102	10.8	7,139	North Athens
Filothei-Psychiko	Filothei	7,370	2.301	3,200	North Athens
Filothei-Psychiko	Neo Psychiko	10,671	1.000	10,670	North Athens
Filothei-Psychiko	Psychiko	9,595	2.776	3,456	North Athens
Irakleio		50,494	4.638	10,890	North Athens
Kifisia	Kifisia	48,700	25.937	1,880	North Athens
Kifisia	Ekali	5,574	4.332	1,287	North Athens
Kifisia	Nea Erythrea	18,604	4.831	3,851	North Athens
Lykovrysi-Pefki	Lykovrysi	9,705	1.950	4,977	North Athens
Lykovrysi-Pefki	Pefki	21,293	2.176	9,785	North Athens
Marousi		71,830	12.938	5,552	North Athens
Metamorfosi		30,174	5.502	5,484	North Athens
Nea Ionia		64,611	4.421	14,610	North Athens
Papagou-Cholargos	Cholargos	31,304	3.950	7,925	North Athens
Papagou-Cholargos	Papagou	13,962	3.375	4,137	North Athens
Penteli	Melissia	23,618	3.956	5,970	North Athens
Penteli	Nea Penteli	6,916	3.230	2,141	North Athens
Penteli	Penteli	5,076	28.878	175.8	North Athens
Vrilissia		32,417	3.856	8,407	North Athens
Agios Dimitrios		71,664	4.949	14,480	South Athens
Alimos		43,174	5.909	7,306	South Athens
Elliniko-Argyroupoli	Argyroupoli	33,312	8.228	4,049	South Athens
Elliniko-Argyroupoli	Elliniko	16,715	7.127	2,345	South Athens
Glyfada		89,597	25.366	3,532.2	South Athens
Kallithea		97,616	4.749	20,560	South Athens
Moschato-Tavros	Moschato	25,322	2.325	10,890	South Athens
Moschato-Tavros	Tavros	14,339	2.125	6,748	South Athens
Nea Smyrni		72,853	3.524	20,670	South Athens
Palaio Faliro		64,863	4.574	14,180	South Athens
Agia Varvara		26,759	2.425	11,030	West Athens
Agioi Anargyroi-Kamatero	Agioi Anargyroi	32,283	3.200	10,090	West Athens
Agioi Anargyroi-Kamatero	Kamatero	29,179	5.950	4,904	West Athens
Aigaleo		65,831	6.450	10,210	West Athens
Haidari		47,051	22.655	2,076.8	West Athens
Ilion		84,004	9.453	8,886	West Athens
Peristeri		133,630	10.05	13,300	West Athens
Petroupoli		60,146	6.597	9,117	West Athens
Keratsini-Drapetsona	Keratsini	75,721	7.601	9,962	Piraeus
Keratsini-Drapetsona	Drapetsona	13,815	1.725	8,009	Piraeus
Korydallos		61,248	4.324	14,160	Piraeus
Nikaia-Agios Ioannis Rentis	Nikaia	88,077	6.649	13,250	Piraeus
Nikaia-Agios Ioannis Rentis	Agios Ioannis Rentis	15,411	4.524	3,406	Piraeus
Perama		25,628	14.729	1,740	Piraeus
Piraeus		168,151	10.865	15,476	Piraeus
Acharnes	Acharnes	100,857	146.41	689	East Attica
Acharnes	Thrakomakedones	7,312	3.550	2,060	East Attica
Vari-Voula-Vouliagmeni	Voula	31,497	8.787	3,584	East Attica
Vari-Voula-Vouliagmeni	Vouliagmeni	4,332	5.805	746	East Attica
Fyli	Ano Liosia	35,047	38.447	911.57	West Attica
Fyli	Zefyri	9,901	1.400	7,072	West Attica

=== Metropolitan area municipalities ===
This is a list of additional municipalities and municipal units which are considered parts of the Athens metropolitan area according to EETT (bright red):

Municipality	Municipal units	Population (2021)	Area (km²)	Density per km²	Regional unit
Dionysos	Agios Stefanos	10,597	8.136	1,302	East Attica
Dionysos	Anoixi	6,592	4.582	1,439	East Attica
Dionysos	Dionysos	7,021	69.36	327.9	East Attica
Dionysos	Drosia	7,837	2.201	3,561	East Attica
Dionysos	Kryoneri	5,318	4.531	1,174	East Attica
Dionysos	Rodopoli	2,110	9.550	221	East Attica
Dionysos	Stamata	2,901	18.950	153.1	East Attica
Kropia (Koropi)		30,817	102.0	302.1	East Attica
Markopoulo Mesogaias		21,722	81.84	265.4	East Attica
Paiania	Glyka Nera	11,877	9.238	1,286	East Attica
Paiania	Paiania	16,159	43.92	367.9	East Attica
Pallini	Anthousa	2,158	3.865	558.3	East Attica
Pallini	Gerakas	33,856	6.633	5,104	East Attica
Pallini	Pallini	23,445	18.93	1,239	East Attica
Rafina-Pikermi	Rafina	14,620	18.979	770.3	East Attica
Rafina-Pikermi	Pikermi	7,707	21.522	358.1	East Attica
Spata-Artemida	Artemida	21,924	18.653	1,175.4	East Attica
Spata-Artemida	Spata	12,991	55.042	236.02	East Attica
Saronikos	Palaia Fokaia	3,025	22.944	131.8	East Attica
Vari-Voula-Vouliagmeni	Vari	16,717	22.633	738.61	East Attica
Aspropyrgos		31,381	101.98	307.72	West Attica
Elefsina	Elefsina	24,971	18.455	1,353.1	West Attica
Elefsina	Magoula	5,176	18.134	285.4	West Attica
Fyli		3,209	69.28	46.32	West Attica
Mandra-Eidyllia	Mandra	12,365	205.770	60.091	West Attica
Salamis	Ampelakia	6,985	15.169	460.5	Islands
Salamis	Salamis	30,235	80.992	373.31	Islands

== Climate ==
Due to its large area metropolitan Athens has a variety of climates. The largest part of the Athens metropolitan area has a hot-summer Mediterranean climate (Köppen climate classification: Csa), while some areas of the Athens Riviera, some areas of the Thriasio Plain and some areas in the west have a hot semi-arid climate (Köppen climate classification: BSh). According to the meteorological stations of the National Observatory of Athens and the Hellenic National Meteorological Service areas in the north have wetter and colder winters. Dionysos has a January average high of around 9 °C and an average low of 4 °C, while Parnitha mountain has a January average high of around 4 °C and an average low below 0 °C. Areas in the south have very mild winters with Nea Smyrni recording a January average high of 15 °C and an average low of 9 °C.

The highest summer maximum temperatures are recorded in the interior of the Athens Basin and also in west areas with Magoula, Nea Filadelfeia, Harokopio University and Salamina registering July mean maximum temperatures as high as 36.5 °C. Due to land breezes, summer nights can be particularly hot in the south and especially around Piraeus which records an average August low of around 27 °C. The highest average annual temperature is recorded in Piraeus Port registering around 20.9 °C, while the lowest is recorded in Parnitha mountain with less than 11.0 °C. Neos Kosmos is the warmest area of Downtown Athens with an average annual temperature of 20.2 °C and a hot semi-arid climate (Köppen climate classification: BSh) closely bordering a hot-summer mediterranean (Csa) climate. During July 2024 minimum temperatures remained over 30 °C (86 °F) for 12 consecutive days in metropolitan Athens, breaking all known records for any area in the country.

The lowest average annual precipitation in metropolitan Athens is recorded in Piraeus Kallipoli with 304 mm, while the highest average annual precipitation is recorded in Parnitha mountain with around 720 mm. The highest temperature ever recorded in the Athens metropolitan area was 48.0 °C in Elefsina and Tatoi on July 10, 1977 which according to the World Meteorological Organization was also the highest official temperature ever recorded in Europe until 2021. The lowest temperature ever recorded was −12.0 °C in Parnitha mountain on January 9, 2017. The highest minimum temperature of 32.9 °C (91 °F) was recorded on July 26, 2023 in Hellinikon. Furthermore, Metropolitan Athens has experienced temperatures of 47.5 °C and over in four different locations.

Regarding the whole of the Attica peninsula, the lowest average annual precipitation is found in Anavysos, Athens Riviera with around 290 mm, while the highest average annual precipitation is found in Avlonas with around 910 mm. Lavrio is the only area in mainland Attica that has never recorded an air frost according to the National Observatory of Athens station which operates since 2008.

Climate data for Downtown Athens (1991–2020), Extremes (1890–present)
Month	Jan	Feb	Mar	Apr	May	Jun	Jul	Aug	Sep	Oct	Nov	Dec	Year
Record high °C (°F)	22.8 (73.0)	25.3 (77.5)	28.2 (82.8)	32.2 (90.0)	37.6 (99.7)	44.8 (112.6)	42.8 (109.0)	43.9 (111.0)	38.7 (101.7)	36.5 (97.7)	30.5 (86.9)	23.1 (73.6)	44.8 (112.6)
Mean daily maximum °C (°F)	13.3 (55.9)	14.2 (57.6)	17.0 (62.6)	21.1 (70.0)	26.5 (79.7)	31.6 (88.9)	34.3 (93.7)	34.3 (93.7)	29.6 (85.3)	24.4 (75.9)	18.9 (66.0)	14.4 (57.9)	23.3 (73.9)
Daily mean °C (°F)	10.2 (50.4)	10.8 (51.4)	13.1 (55.6)	16.7 (62.1)	21.8 (71.2)	26.6 (79.9)	29.3 (84.7)	29.4 (84.9)	25.0 (77.0)	20.3 (68.5)	15.6 (60.1)	11.6 (52.9)	19.2 (66.6)
Mean daily minimum °C (°F)	7.1 (44.8)	7.3 (45.1)	9.2 (48.6)	12.3 (54.1)	17.0 (62.6)	21.6 (70.9)	24.2 (75.6)	24.4 (75.9)	20.4 (68.7)	16.2 (61.2)	12.2 (54.0)	8.7 (47.7)	15.0 (59.0)
Record low °C (°F)	−6.5 (20.3)	−5.7 (21.7)	−2.6 (27.3)	1.7 (35.1)	6.2 (43.2)	11.8 (53.2)	16 (61)	15.5 (59.9)	8.9 (48.0)	5.9 (42.6)	−1.1 (30.0)	−4.0 (24.8)	−6.5 (20.3)
Average rainfall mm (inches)	55.6 (2.19)	44.4 (1.75)	45.6 (1.80)	27.6 (1.09)	20.7 (0.81)	11.6 (0.46)	10.7 (0.42)	5.4 (0.21)	25.8 (1.02)	38.6 (1.52)	70.8 (2.79)	76.3 (3.00)	433.1 (17.06)
Average relative humidity (%)	72.0	70.0	66.0	60.0	56.0	50.0	42.0	47.0	57.0	66.0	72.0	73.0	60.9
Average ultraviolet index	2	3	5	7	9	10	10	9	6	4	2	2	6
Source 1: Cosmos, scientific magazine of the National Observatory of Athens
Source 2: Meteoclub

Climate data for Piraeus Hellenic National Meteorological Service (1981-2010)
Month	Jan	Feb	Mar	Apr	May	Jun	Jul	Aug	Sep	Oct	Nov	Dec	Year
Mean daily maximum °C (°F)	14.1 (57.4)	14.4 (57.9)	16.6 (61.9)	20.3 (68.5)	25.1 (77.2)	29.9 (85.8)	32.8 (91.0)	32.9 (91.2)	29.1 (84.4)	24.2 (75.6)	18.9 (66.0)	15.4 (59.7)	22.81 (73.06)
Daily mean °C (°F)	11.1 (52.0)	11.2 (52.2)	13.3 (55.9)	16.9 (62.4)	21.4 (70.5)	26.3 (79.3)	29.0 (84.2)	28.8 (83.8)	25.2 (77.4)	20.6 (69.1)	15.8 (60.4)	12.6 (54.7)	19.35 (66.83)
Mean daily minimum °C (°F)	8.2 (46.8)	7.9 (46.2)	10.0 (50.0)	13.4 (56.1)	17.7 (63.9)	22.2 (72.0)	24.8 (76.6)	25.0 (77.0)	21.5 (70.7)	17.4 (63.3)	12.9 (55.2)	9.7 (49.5)	15.89 (60.60)
Average rainfall mm (inches)	41.95 (1.65)	36.26 (1.43)	34.09 (1.34)	30.34 (1.19)	15.95 (0.63)	5.08 (0.20)	5.56 (0.22)	3.07 (0.12)	11.37 (0.45)	30.5 (1.20)	58.87 (2.32)	58.84 (2.32)	331.9 (13.07)

Climate data for Athens metropolitan area (Record Highs)
Month	Jan	Feb	Mar	Apr	May	Jun	Jul	Aug	Sep	Oct	Nov	Dec	Year
Record high °C (°F)	25.9 (78.6)	25.8 (78.4)	30.3 (86.5)	33.2 (91.8)	40.6 (105.1)	47.5 (117.5)	48.0 (118.4)	45.3 (113.5)	41.6 (106.9)	38.4 (101.1)	31.6 (88.9)	25.0 (77.0)	48.0 (118.4)

Climate data for Attica (Record Highs)
Month	Jan	Feb	Mar	Apr	May	Jun	Jul	Aug	Sep	Oct	Nov	Dec	Year
Record high °C (°F)	25.9 (78.6)	25.9 (78.6)	30.3 (86.5)	33.4 (92.1)	40.6 (105.1)	47.5 (117.5)	48.0 (118.4)	46.2 (115.2)	41.6 (106.9)	38.4 (101.1)	32.2 (90.0)	25.8 (78.4)	48.0 (118.4)

== Economy ==
The Gross domestic product (GDP) of the region was 87.4 billion € in 2018, accounting for about 47% of the Greek economic output. GDP per capita adjusted for purchasing power was 28,000 € or 93% of the EU27 average in the same year. The GDP per employee was 99% of the EU average. Attica is the region in Greece with the highest GDP per capita.
