= List of former toponyms in Attica Prefecture =

Many inhabited places in Attica Prefecture of Greece have both Arvanitic and Greek forms. Some of the forms are identifiably of Greek origin, others of Arvanitic, yet others of Turkish or more obscure origins. Renamings were done to place Greek names first on places with Arvanitic and Turkish names.

| Former name(s) | Current official name(s) | Municipality | Geographic Coordinates | Citation & Date of rename dd/mm/yyyy | Population (2011) | Other |
| Bafi (Μπάφι) | Agia Eleni (Αγία Ελένη) | Troizinia-Methana | 37°33′N 23°11′E | ΦΕΚ 287Α - 10/10/1955 | 159 | |
| Mulkia, Moulkia (Μούλκια) | Agios Georgios (Άγιος Γεώργιος) | Troizinia-Methana | 37°30′N 23°23′E | ΦΕΚ 188Α - 19/08/1954 | 228 | |
| Avlon (Αυλών) | Anthousa (Ανθούσα) | Pallini | 38°2′N 23°52′E | ΦΕΚ 219Α - 11/12/1963 | 2,132 | |
| Pyritidopoieion (Πυριτιδοποιείον) | Aigaleo (Αιγάλεω) | Aigaleo | 37°59′N 23°40′E | 16/10/1940 | 69,946 | |
| Liopesi (Λιόπεσι) | Paiania (Παιανία) | Paiania | 37°57′N 23°51′E | ΦΕΚ 148Α - 20/04/1915 | 26,668 | |
| Bala (Μπάλα) | Rodopoli (Ροδόπολη) | Dionysos | 38°6′N 23°52′E | ΦΕΚ 162Α - 25/06/1981 | 2,078 | |
| Kamariza (Καμάριζα) | Agios Konstantinos (Άγιος Κωνσταντίνος) | Lavreotiki | 37°43′N 24°1′E | ΦΕΚ 188Α - 19/08/1954 | 728 | |
| Mulki, Moulki (Μούλκι) | Aianteio (Αιάντειο) | Salamis | 37°55′N 23°28′E | ΦΕΚ 232Α - 26/06/1915 | 4,860 | |
| Magufana, Magoufana (Μαγκουφάνα) | Pefki (Πεύκη) | Lykovrysi-Pefki | 38°4′N 23°48′E | ΦΕΚ 16Α - 19/02/1960 | 21,352 | |
| Katsipodi (Κατσιπόδι) | Dafni (Δάφνη) | Dafni-Ymittos | 37°57′N 23°44′E | ΦΕΚ 81Α - 21/03/1951 | 22,913 | |
| Charvati (Χαρβάτι) | Pallini (Παλλήνη) | Pallini | 38°0′N 23°53′E | ΦΕΚ 18Α - 29/01/1905 | 54,415 | |
| Nea Liosia (Νέα Λιόσια) | Ilion (Ίλιον) | Ilion | 38°2′N 23°42′E | ΦΕΚ 159Α - 29/09/1994 | 84,793 | |
| Loutsa (Λούτσα) | Artemida (Αρτέμιδα) | Spata-Artemida | 37°58′N 24°0′E | ΦΕΚ 249Α - 05/09/1977 | 21,488 | |
| Koursalas (Κουρσαλάς) | Koropi (Κορωπί) | Kropia | 37°54′N 23°52′E | ^{α} | 19,164 | |
| Brahami (Μπραχάμι) | Agios Dimitrios (Άγιος Δημήτριος) | Agios Dimitrios | 37°56′N 23°44′E | ΦΕΚ 156Α - 08/08/1928 | 71,294 | |
| Mazi (Μάζι; until 1927); Tripodiskos (Τριποδίσκος; until 1954) | Sparta (Σπάρτα) | Megara | 38°2′N 23°9′E | ΦΕΚ 179Α - 30/08/1927; ΦΕΚ 188Α - 19/08/1954 | 20 | |
| Buzalades, Bouzalades (Μπουζαλάδες) | Ano Daskaleio (Άνω Δασκαλειό) | Lavreotiki | 37°48′N 24°2′E | 18/03/2001 | 139 | |
| Buga, Bouga (Μπούγα) | Asprochori (Ασπροχώρι) | Oropos | 38°16′N 23°45′E | ΦΕΚ 179Α - 30/08/1927 | 151 | |
| Spatatziki (Σπατατζίκι) | Pefkofyto (Πευκόφυτο) | Agios Stefanos | 38°9′N 23°52′E | ΦΕΚ 179Α - 30/08/1927 | 123 | |
| Koutsikari (Κουτσικάρι) | Korydallos (Κορυδαλλός) | Korydallos | 37°59′N 23°39′E | ΦΕΚ 22Α - 18/01/1934 | 63,445 | |
| Chasia (Χασιά) | Fyli (Φυλή) | Fyli | 38°6′N 23°40′E | ΦΕΚ 273Α - 11/08/1915 | 45,965 | |
| Kriekouki (Κριεκούκι) | Erythres (Ερυθρές) | Mandra-Eidyllia | 38°13′N 23°19′E | ΦΕΚ 179Α - 30/08/1927 | 3,349 | |
| Kiurka, Kiourka (Κιούρκα) | Afidnes (Αφίδνες) | Oropos | 38°12′N 23°50′E | ΦΕΚ 56Β - 10/09/1919 | 3,642 | |
| Kokkinia (Κοκκινιά) | Nikaia (Νίκαια) | Nikaia-Agios Ioannis Rentis | 38°6′N 23°40′E | ΦΕΚ 271Α - 03/09/1940 | 89,380 | |
| Palaio Boyati (Παλαιό Μπογιάτι) | Anixi (Άνοιξη) | Dionysos | 38°8′N 23°52′E | | 6,510 | |
| Neo Boyati (Νέο Μπογιάτι) | Agios Stefanos (Άγιος Στέφανος) | Dionysos | 38°8′N 23°51′E | | 10,015 | |
| Durguti, Dourgouti (Δουργούτι) | Neos Kosmos (Νέος Κόσμος) | Athens | 37°57′N 23°43′E | ΦΕΚ80Δ - 4/2/1988 | | |

== Notes ==
^α Official sources do not state when the town was renamed. The town had both Koropi and Koursalas as official names until somewhere around 1847–1899.
