= List of municipalities and communities in Greece (1997–2010) =

From 1 January 2011, in accordance with the Kallikratis plan, the administrative system of Greece was drastically overhauled. For the current list, see List of municipalities of Greece (2011). This is an alphabetical list of municipalities and communities in Greece from 1997 to 2010, under the Kapodistrias Plan.

For an ordered list of cities with a population over 10,000, see List of cities in Greece.

== List ==
Name	Greek name	Prefecture
Abdera	Άβδηρα	Xanthi
Acharnes	Αχαρνές	East Attica
Acheloos	Αχελώος	Karditsa
Acherontas	Αχέροντας	Thesprotia
Achilleio	Αχίλλειο	Corfu
Achinos	Αχινός	Serres
Achladochori	Αχλαδοχώρι	Serres
Achladokampos	Αχλαδόκαμπος	Argolis
Aegina	Αίγινα	Piraeus
Aetomilitsa	Αετομηλίτσα	Ioannina
Aetos	Αετός	Florina
Aetos	Αετός	Messenia
Afantou	Αφάντου	Dodecanese
Afetes	Αφέτες	Magnesia
Afidnes	Αφίδνες	East Attica
Agathonisi	Αγαθονήσι	Dodecanese
Agia	Αγιά	Larissa
Agia Paraskevi	Αγία Παρασκευή	Athens
Agia Paraskevi	Αγία Παρασκευή	Kozani
Agia Paraskevi	Αγία Παρασκευή	Lesbos
Agia Triada	Αγία Τριάδα	Kastoria
Agia Varvara	Αγία Βαρβάρα	Athens
Agia Varvara	Αγία Βαρβάρα	Heraklion
Agiasos	Αγιάσος	Lesbos
Agioi Anargyroi	Άγιοι Ανάργυροι	Athens
Agioi Anargyroi	Άγιοι Ανάργυροι	Kastoria
Agioi Theodoroi	Άγιοι Θεόδωροι	Corinthia
Agios Athanasios	Άγιος Αθανάσιος	Thessaloniki
Agios Dimitrios	Άγιος Δημήτριος	Athens
Agios Dimitrios	Άγιος Δημήτριος	Ioannina
Agios Efstratios	Άγιος Ευστράτιος	Lesbos
Agios Georgios	Άγιος Γεώργιος	Corfu
Agios Georgios	Άγιος Γεώργιος	Thessaloniki
Agios Georgios Tymfristou	Άγιος Γεώργιος Τυμφρηστού	Phthiotis
Agios Ioannis Rentis	Άγιος Ιωάννης Ρέντη	Piraeus
Agios Konstantinos	Άγιος Κωνσταντίνος	East Attica
Agios Konstantinos	Άγιος Κωνσταντίνος	Phthiotis
Agios Kirykos	Άγιος Κήρυκος	Samos
Agios Minas	Άγιος Μηνάς	Chios
Agios Nikolaos	Άγιος Νικόλαος	Lasithi
Agios Pavlos	Άγιος Παύλος	Thessaloniki
Agios Stefanos	Άγιος Στέφανος	East Attica
Agkistri	Αγκίστρι	Piraeus
Agkistro	Άγκιστρο	Serres
Agnanta	Άγναντα	Arta
Agrafa	Άγραφα	Evrytania
Agria	Αγριά	Magnesia
Agrinio	Αγρίνιο	Aetolia-Acarnania
Aiani	Αιανή	Kozani
Aidipsos	Αιδιψός	Euboea
Aigaleo	Αιγάλεω	Athens
Aigeira	Αιγείρα	Achaea
Aigeiros	Αίγειρος	Rhodope
Aiginio	Αιγίνιο	Pieria
Aigio	Αίγιο	Achaea
Aipeia	Αιπεία	Messenia
Aisonia	Αισωνία	Magnesia
Aithikes	Αίθηκες	Trikala
Aitoliko	Αιτωλικό	Aetolia-Acarnania
Akraifnia	Ακραιφνία	Boeotia
Akrata	Ακράτα	Achaea
Akrites	Καστοριά	Kastoria
Akrotiri	Ακρωτήρι	Chania
Alea	Αλέα	Argolis
Alexandreia	Αλεξάνδρεια	Imathia
Alexandroupoli	Αλεξανδρούπολη	Evros
Aliartos	Αλίαρτος	Boeotia
Alifeira	Αλίφειρα	Elis
Alimos	Άλιμος	Athens
Alistrati	Αλιστράτη	Serres
Almyros	Αλμυρός	Magnesia
Alonnisos	Αλόννησος	Magnesia
Alykes	Αλυκές	Zakynthos
Alyzia	Αλυζία	Aetolia-Acarnania
Amaliada	Αμαλιάδα	Elis
Amani	Αμανή	Chios
Amarousio	Αμαρούσιο	Athens
Amarynthos	Αμάρυνθος	Euboea
Amaxades	Αμαξάδες	Rhodope
Amfikleia	Αμφίκλεια	Phthiotis
Amfilochia	Αμφιλοχία	Aetolia-Acarnania
Amfipoli	Αμφίπολη	Serres
Amfissa	Άμφισσα	Phocis
Amorgos	Αμοργός	Cyclades
Ampelakia	Αμπελάκια	Larissa
Ampelakia	Αμπελάκια	Piraeus
Ampelokipoi	Αμπελόκηποι	Thessaloniki
Ampelonas	Αμπελώνας	Larissa
Amvrakikos	Αμβρακικός	Arta
Amyntaio	Αμύνταιο	Florina
Anafi	Ανάφη	Cyclades
Anaktorio	Ανακτόριο	Aetolia-Acarnania
Anatoli	Ανατολή	Ioannina
Anavra	Ανάβρα	Magnesia
Anavyssos	Ανάβυσσος	East Attica
Andania	Ανδανία	Messenia
Andravida	Ανδραβίδα	Elis
Andritsaina	Ανδρίτσαινα	Elis
Andros	Άνδρος	Cyclades
Androusa	Ανδρούσα	Messenia
Angelokastro	Αγγελόκαστρο	Aetolia-Acarnania
Ano Kalamas		Ioannina
Ano Liosia	Άνω Λιόσια	West Attica
Ano Pogoni		Ioannina
Ano Syros	Άνω Σύρος	Cyclades
Ano Vrontou		Serres
Anogeia		Rethymno
Anogeio		Preveza
Anoixi	Άνοιξη	East Attica
Anthemia		Imathia
Anthemountas		Chalkidiki
Anthidona		Euboea
Anthousa	Ανθούσα	East Attica
Antichasia		Larissa
Antigonides		Imathia
Antikyra		Boeotia
Antikythera	Αντικύθηρα	Piraeus
Antiparos	Αντίπαρος	Cyclades
Antirrio	Αντίρριο	Aetolia-Acarnania
Aperantia		Evrytania
Apodotia		Aetolia-Acarnania
Apollonia		Thessaloniki
Apollonioi	Απολλώνιοι	Lefkada
Apostolos Pavlos	Απόστολος Παύλος	Imathia
Arachova	Αράχωβα	Boeotia
Arachthos	Άραχθος	Arta
Arakynthos		Aetolia-Acarnania
Archanes	Αρχάνες	Heraklion
Archangelos	Αρχάγγελος	Dodecanese
Arethousa	Αρεθούσα	Thessaloniki
Arfara		Messenia
Argalasti	Αργαλαστή	Magnesia
Argithea		Karditsa
Argos	Άργος	Argolis
Argos Orestiko		Kastoria
Argostoli	Αργοστόλι	Kefalonia
Argyroupoli	Αργυρούπολη	Athens
Aridaia		Pella
Aris		Messenia
Aristomenis		Messenia
Arkadi	Αρκάδι	Rethymno
Arkadioi	Αρκάδιοι	Zakynthos
Arkalochori	Αρκαλοχώρι	Heraklion
Armenio		Larissa
Armenoi	Αρμένοι	Chania
Arnaia		Chalkidiki
Arni		Karditsa
Aroania	Αροάνια	Achaea
Arrenes		Kastoria
Arriana		Rhodope
Arta	Άρτα	Arta
Artemida	Αρτέμιδα	East Attica
Artemida	Αρτέμιδα	Magnesia
Artemisia		Zakynthos
Artemisio		Euboea
Asi Gonia		Chania
Asini		Argolis
Askio		Kozani
Asklipieio		Argolis
Asopos		Laconia
Aspropotamos		Evrytania
Aspropotamos		Trikala
Aspropyrgos	Ασπρόπυργος	West Attica
Assiros		Thessaloniki
Assos-Lechaio		Corinthia
Astakos		Aetolia-Acarnania
Asterousia	Αστερούσια	Heraklion
Astypalaia	Αστυπάλαια	Dodecanese
Atalanti		Phthiotis
Anatoliki Argithea		Karditsa
Athamania		Arta
Attavyros		Dodecanese
Athens	Αθήνα	Athens
Atsiki		Lesbos
Avdella		Grevena
Avia		Messenia
Avlida		Euboea
Avlon		Euboea
Avlonas		East Attica
Avlonas		Messenia
Axios		Thessaloniki
Axioupoli	Αξιούπολη	Kilkis
Bizani		Ioannina
Central Zagori	Κεντρικό Ζαγόρι	Ioannina
Chaidari	Χαϊδάρι	Athens
Chaironeia	Χερώνεια	Boeotia
Chalcis	Χαλκίδα	Euboea
Chalandri	Χαλάνδρι	Athens
Chalastra	Χαλάστρα	Thessaloniki
Chalkeia		Aetolia-Acarnania
Chalki		Dodecanese
Chalkidona	Χαλκηδόνα	Thessaloniki
Chania	Χανιά	Chania
Chasia		Grevena
Chasia		Trikala
Cherso		Kilkis
Chersonisos	Χερσόνησος	Heraklion
Chiliochoria		Messenia
Chios (town)	Χίος	Chios
Cholargos	Χολαργός	Athens
Chortiatis		Thessaloniki
Chrysoupoli	Χρυσούπολη	Kavala
Corfu (city)	Κέρκυρα	Corfu
Corinth	Κόρινθος	Corinthia
Dafni	Δάφνη	Athens
Dafnousia		Phthiotis
Davleia		Boeotia
Delphi	Δελφοί	Phocis
Delvinaki	Δελβινάκι	Ioannina
Dervenochoria	Δερβενοχώρια	Boeotia
Derviziana		Ioannina
Desfina	Δεσφίνα	Phocis
Deskati		Grevena
Diakopto	Διακοπτό	Achaea
Didymoteicho	Διδυμότειχο	Evros
Dikaio		Dodecanese
Dimitrios Ypsilantis		Kozani
Dimitsana	Δημητσάνα	Arcadia
Dio		Pieria
Dionysos		East Attica
Dirfys		Euboea
Distomo	Δίστομο	Boeotia
Distrato		Ioannina
Dodoni	Δωδώνη	Ioannina
Doirani		Kilkis
Domnista		Evrytania
Domokos	Δομοκός	Phthiotis
Donousa		Cyclades
Dorio		Messenia
Dotsiko		Grevena
Dovras		Imathia
Doxato	Δοξάτο	Drama
Drama	Δράμα	Drama
Drapetsona	Δραπετσώνα	Piraeus
Drosia	Δροσιά	East Attica
Drymalia		Cyclades
Dymi		Achaea
Dystos		Euboea
East Mani		Laconia
East Olympos		Pieria
East Selino	Ανατολικό Σέλινο	Chania
East Zagori		Ioannina
Echedoros		Thessaloniki
Echinaioi		Phthiotis
Edessa	Έδεσσα	Pella
Efkarpia		Thessaloniki
Efpalio		Phocis
Egnatia		Ioannina
Egnatia		Thessaloniki
Eira		Messenia
Eirinoupoli		Imathia
Ekali	Εκάλη	Athens
Ekali		Ioannina
Elafina		Pieria
Elafonisos		Laconia
Elassona		Larissa
Elateia		Phthiotis
Elatia		Zakynthos
Eleftheres		Kavala
Eleftherio-Kordelio		Thessaloniki
Eleftherios Venizelos		Chania
Eleftheroupoli		Kavala
Eleios-Pronnoi		Kefalonia
Eleusis	Ελευσίνα	West Attica
Elimeia		Kozani
Elliniko	Ελληνικό	Athens
Ellispontos		Kozani
Ellomenos		Lefkada
Elos		Laconia
Elymnioi		Euboea
Emmanouil Pappas		Serres
Enippeas		Larissa
Epanomi		Thessaloniki
Epidaurus	Επίδαυρος	Argolis
Episkopi	Επισκοπή	Heraklion
Ereikoussa		Corfu
Eresos-Antissa		Lesbos
Eretria		Euboea
Erineos		Achaea
Erisos		Kefalonia
Ermioni		Argolis
Ermoupoli	Ερμούπολη	Cyclades
Erythres	Ερυθρές	West Attica
Esperies		Corfu
Estiaiotida		Trikala
Evdilos		Samos
Evergetoulas		Lesbos
Evosmos	Εύοσμος	Thessaloniki
Evropos		Kilkis
Evrostina	Ευρωστίνα	Corinthia
Evrymenes		Ioannina
Evrymenes		Larissa
Exaplatanos		Pella
Exomvourgo		Cyclades
Faiakes		Corfu
Falaisia		Arcadia
Falanthos		Arcadia
Faloreia		Trikala
Fanari		Preveza
Faris		Laconia
Farkadona		Trikala
Farres		Achaea
Farsala	Φάρσαλα	Larissa
Feneos		Corinthia
Feres		Evros
Feres		Magnesia
Figaleia		Elis
Filiates		Thesprotia
Filiatra	Φιλιατρά	Messenia
Filippaioi		Grevena
Filippiada		Preveza
Filippoi		Kavala
Fillyra		Rhodope
Filotas		Florina
Filothei		Arta
Filothei	Φιλοθέη	Athens
Florina	Φλώρινα	Florina
Foinikas	Φοίνικας	Rethymno
Folegandros	Φολέγανδρος	Cyclades
Foloi		Elis
Fourka		Ioannina
Fourna		Evrytania
Fournoi Korseon		Samos
Fragkista		Evrytania
Fres		Chania
Fyli		West Attica
Fyllo		Karditsa
Fyteies		Aetolia-Acarnania
Galatsi	Γαλάτσι	Athens
Galaxidi	Γαλαξίδι	Phocis
Gallikos	Γαλλικός	Kilkis
Gargalianoi	Γαργαλιάνοι	Messenia
Gastouni	Γαστούνη	Elis
Gavdos	Γαύδος	Chania
Gazi	Γάζι	Heraklion
Georgios Karaïskakis		Arta
Georgioupoli		Chania
Gera		Lesbos
Gerakas	Γέρακας	East Attica
Geronthres		Laconia
Geropotamos		Rethymno
Giannitsa	Γιαννιτσά	Pella
Giannouli		Larissa
Glyfada	Γλυφάδα	Athens
Glyka Nera		East Attica
Gomfoi		Trikala
Gonnoi	Γόννοι	Larissa
Gorgiani		Grevena
Gorgolainis		Heraklion
Gorgopotamos	Γοργοπόταμος	Phthiotis
Gortyna	Γορτυνία	Arcadia
Gortyna	Γόρτυνος	Heraklion
Goumenissa		Kilkis
Gouves	Γούβες	Heraklion
Grammatiko	Γραμματικό	East Attica
Gramos		Kastoria
Gravia	Γραβιά	Phocis
Grevena	Γρεβενά	Grevena
Gytheio	Γύθειο	Laconia
Heraklion	Ηράκλειο	Heraklion
Hydra	Ύδρα	Piraeus
Ialysos	Ιαλυσός	Dodecanese
Iardanos		Elis
Iasmos		Rhodope
Ierapetra	Ιεράπετρα	Lasithi
Igoumenitsa	Ηγουμενίτσα	Thesprotia
Ilio	Ίλιο	Athens
Ilioupoli	Ηλιούπολη	Athens
Inachos		Aetolia-Acarnania
Innachori		Chania
Ioannina	Ιωάννινα	Ioannina
Ioannina Island		Ioannina
Iolkos		Magnesia
Ion Dragoumis		Kastoria
Ionia		Chios
Ios		Cyclades
Iraia		Arcadia
Irakleia		Arta
Irakleia		Cyclades
Irakleia		Serres
Irakleides		Dodecanese
Irakleio	Ηράκλειο	Athens
Irakleotes		Grevena
Istiaia	Ιστιαία	Euboea
Itamos		Karditsa
Itanos		Lasithi
Itea		Phocis
Ithaca	Ιθάκη	Kefalonia
Ithomi		Karditsa
Ithomi		Messenia
Kafireas		Euboea
Kaisariani	Καισαριανή	Athens
Kalamaria	Καλαμαριά	Thessaloniki
Kalamata	Καλαμάτα	Messenia
Kalamos	Κάλαμος	East Attica
Kalamos		Lefkada
Kalampaka	Καλαμπάκα	Trikala
Kalampaki		Drama
Kalarites		Ioannina
Kalavryta	Καλάβρυτα	Achaea
Kalentzi		Achaea
Kallidendro		Trikala
Kallieis		Phocis
Kallifono		Karditsa
Kallikrateia		Chalkidiki
Kallindoia		Thessaloniki
Kallithea	Καλλιθέα	Athens
Kallithea		Dodecanese
Kallithea		Thessaloniki
Kalloni		Lesbos
Kalpaki		Ioannina
Kalymnos	Κάλυμνος	Dodecanese
Kalyvia Thorikou		East Attica
Kamatero	Καματερό	Athens
Kameiros		Dodecanese
Kamena Vourla	Καμμένα Βούρλα	Phthiotis
Kampochora		Chios
Kampos		Karditsa
Kamvounia		Kozani
Kandanos	Κάνδανος	Chania
Kapandriti	Καπανδρίτι	East Attica
Kapetan Mitrousi		Serres
Kardamyla		Chios
Karditsa	Καρδίτσα	Karditsa
Karla		Magnesia
Karlovasi	Καρλόβασι	Samos
Karpathos	Κάρπαθος	Dodecanese
Karpenisi	Καρπενήσι	Evrytania
Karya		Larissa
Karya		Lefkada
Karyes		Laconia
Karystos	Κάρυστος	Euboea
Kasos		Dodecanese
Kassandra		Chalkidiki
Kassopaia		Corfu
Kastania		Trikala
Kasteli	Καστέλι	Heraklion
Kastellorizo	Καστελόριζο	Dodecanese
Kastoria	Καστοριά	Kastoria
Kastos		Lefkada
Kastraki		Kastoria
Kastro-Kyllini		Elis
Katerini	Κατερίνη	Pieria
Kato Kleines		Florina
Kato Nevrokopi		Drama
Kato Olympos		Larissa
Katsanochoria		Ioannina
Kavala	Καβάλα	Kavala
Kea	Κέα	Cyclades
Kechros		Rhodope
Kekropia		Aetolia-Acarnania
Keramia		Chania
Keramidi		Magnesia
Keramoti		Kavala
Keratsini	Κερατσίνι	Piraeus
Keratea	Κερατέα	East Attica
Kerkini		Serres
Kifisia	Κηφισιά	Athens
Kileler	Κιλελέρ	Larissa
Kilkis	Κιλκίς	Kilkis
Kimolos	Κίμωλος	Cyclades
Kireas		Euboea
Kissamos	Κίσσαμος	Chania
Kleino	Κλεινό	Trikala
Kleisoura		Kastoria
Kleitor		Arcadia
Kleitoria (Lefkasio)		Achaea
Kofinas	Κόφινας	Heraklion
Koilada		Larissa
Kolindros		Pieria
Kolymvari		Chania
Kommeno		Arta
Komotini	Κομοτηνή	Rhodope
Kompoti		Arta
Konistres		Euboea
Konitsa	Κόνιτσα	Ioannina
Kontovazaina	Κοντοβάζαινα	Arcadia
Korestia		Kastoria
Korinos		Pieria
Korissia		Corfu
Kormista		Serres
Koroneia		Boeotia
Koroneia		Thessaloniki
Koroni		Messenia
Korthio		Cyclades
Korydallos	Κορυδαλλός	Piraeus
Korythio		Arcadia
Kos	Κώς	Dodecanese
Kosmas	Κοσμάς	Arcadia
Kosmas o Aitolos		Grevena
Kotyli		Xanthi
Koufalia		Thessaloniki
Koufonisi	Κουφονήσι,Κουφονήσια	Cyclades
Kouloukonas		Rethymno
Kourites		Rethymno
Koutsopodi		Argolis
Kouvaras		East Attica
Kozani	Κοζάνη	Kozani
Koziakas		Trikala
Kranea		Preveza
Kranidi	Κρανίδι	Argolis
Krannonas		Larissa
Krokees		Laconia
Kropia	Κρωπία	East Attica
Krousonas	Κρουσώνας	Heraklion
Kroussa		Kilkis
Krya Vrysi	Κρύα Βρύση	Pella
Kryoneri		East Attica
Kryonerida		Chania
Krystallopigi		Florina
Ktimenia		Evrytania
Kymi	Κύμη	Euboea
Kyparissia	Κυπαρισσία	Messenia
Kyprinos		Evros
Kyriaki		Boeotia
Kyrros		Pella
Kythira	Κύθηρα	Piraeus
Kythnos	Κύθνος	Cyclades
Lachanas		Thessaloniki
Laganas		Zakynthos
Lagkadas	Λαγκαδάς	Thessaloniki
Lagkadia	Λαγκάδια	Arcadia
Lakereia		Larissa
Lamia	Λαμία	Phthiotis
Lampeia		Elis
Lampi		Rethymno
Lappa		Rethymno
Larissa	Λάρισα	Larissa
Larissos		Achaea
Lasiona		Elis
Lavdani		Ioannina
Lavreotiki	Λαυρεωτική	East Attica
Lechaina		Elis
Lechovo		Florina
Lefkada (city)	Λευκάδα	Lefkada
Lefki		Lasithi
Lefkimmi		Corfu
Lefkonas		Serres
Lefktro	Λεύκτρο	Messenia
Leianokladi	Λιανοκλάδι	Phthiotis
Leipsoi	Λειψοί	Dodecanese
Leivatho		Kefalonia
Leonidio	Λεωνίδιο	Arcadia
Leontio		Achaea
Lerna		Argolis
Leros		Dodecanese
Levidi	Λεβίδι	Arcadia
Lichada		Euboea
Lidoriki	Λιδορίκι	Phocis
Lilantia		Euboea
Lindos	Λίνδος	Dodecanese
Litochoro	Λιτόχωρο	Pieria
Livadeia	Λιβαδειά	Boeotia
Livadero		Kozani
Livadi		Larissa
Livadia		Kilkis
Louros	Λούρος	Preveza
Loutraki-Perachora	Λουτράκι-Περαχώρα	Corinthia
Loutropoli Thermis		Lesbos
Lykovrysi	Λυκόβρυση	Athens
Lyrkeia		Argolis
Madytos		Thessaloniki
Magoula	Μαγούλα	West Attica
Makednoi		Kastoria
Makedonida		Imathia
Makrakomi	Μακρακώμη	Phthiotis
Makrinitsa	Μακρινίτσα	Magnesia
Makrychori		Larissa
Makryneia		Aetolia-Acarnania
Makry Gialos		Lasithi
Malakasa	Μαλακάσα	East Attica
Malakasi		Trikala
Malesina		Phthiotis
Malia	Μάλια	Heraklion
Mandra	Μάνδρα,Μάντρα	West Attica
Mantamados	Μανταμάδος	Lesbos
Mantineia	Μαντινεία	Arcadia
Marathokampos	Μαραθόκαμπος	Samos
Marathon		East Attica
Margariti		Thesprotia
Markopoulo Mesogaias		East Attica
Markopoulo Oropou		East Attica
Marmari		Euboea
Maroneia		Rhodope
Mastichochoria	Μαστιχοχώρια	Chios
Mastorochoria		Ioannina
Mathraki		Corfu
Matsouki		Ioannina
Medeon		Aetolia-Acarnania
Megala Kalyvia		Trikala
Megalopoli	Μεγαλόπολη	Arcadia
Meganisi		Lefkada
Megara	Μέγαρα	West Attica
Megas Alexandros	Μέγας Αλέξανδρος	Pella
Meligalas	Μελιγαλάς	Messenia
Meliki		Imathia
Melissia	Μελίσσια	Athens
Melissourgoi		Arta
Meliteieis		Corfu
Meliti		Florina
Melivoia		Larissa
Menelaida		Karditsa
Menemeni	Μενεμένη	Thessaloniki
Menidi		Aetolia-Acarnania
Meniida		Pella
Mesolouri	Μεσολούρι	Grevena
Mesopotamia		Kastoria
Messapia		Euboea
Messatida		Achaea
Messini	Μεσσήνη	Messenia
Missolonghi	Μεσολόγγι	Aetolia-Acarnania
Metamorfosi	Μεταμόρφωση	Athens
Metaxades		Evros
Methana	Μέθανα	Piraeus
Methoni		Messenia
Methoni		Pieria
Metsovo	Μέτσοβο	Ioannina
Michaniona		Thessaloniki
Midea		Argolis
Mikra		Thessaloniki
Milea		Ioannina
Milies		Magnesia
Milos	Μήλος	Cyclades
Mithymna		Lesbos
Mitropoli		Karditsa
Moires	Μοίρες	Heraklion
Molaoi		Laconia
Molos		Phthiotis
Molossoi		Ioannina
Monemvasia	Μονεμβασιά	Laconia
Moschato	Μοσχάτο	Athens
Moudania	Μουδανιά	Chalkidiki
Moudros		Lesbos
Mouresi		Magnesia
Mouries		Kilkis
Mouriki		Kozani
Mousouroi		Chania
Mouzaki		Karditsa
Movri		Achaea
Myki		Xanthi
Mygdonia		Thessaloniki
Mykines	Μυκήνες	Argolis
Mykonos	Μύκονος	Cyclades
Myrina		Lesbos
Myrofyllo		Trikala
Mystras	Μυστράς	Laconia
Mythimna		Chania
Mytilene	Μυτιλήνη	Lesbos
Nafplio	Ναύπλιο	Argolis
Naousa	Νάουσα	Imathia
Narthaki		Larissa
Naupactus	Ναύπακτος	Aetolia-Acarnania
Naxos (city)	Νάξος	Cyclades
Nea Alikarnassos	Νέα Αλικαρνασσός	Heraklion
Nea Anchialos		Magnesia
Nea Artaki		Euboea
Nea Chalkidona	Νέα Χαλκηδόνα	Athens
Nea Erythraia	Νέα Ερυθραία	Athens
Nea Filadelfeia	Νέα Φιλαδέλφεια	Athens
Nea Ionia	Νέα Ιωνία	Athens
Nea Ionia		Magnesia
Nea Kios		Argolis
Nea Koutali		Lesbos
Nea Kydonia		Chania
Nea Makri	Νέα Μάκρη	East Attica
Nea Penteli	Νέα Πεντέλη	Athens
Nea Peramos	Νέα Πέραμος	West Attica
Nea Smyrni	Νέα Σμύρνη	Athens
Nea Tiryntha		Argolis
Nea Zichni		Serres
Neapoli	Νεάπολη	Aetolia-Acarnania
Neapoli	Νεάπολη	Kozani
Neapoli	Νεάπολη	Lasithi
Neapoli	Νεάπολη	Thessaloniki
Nemea	Νεμέα	Corinthia
Neo Psychiko	Νέο Ψυχικό	Athens
Neo Sidirochori		Rhodope
Neraida		Trikala
Nessonas		Larissa
Nestoras		Messenia
Nestorio		Kastoria
Nevropoli Agrafon		Karditsa
Niata		Laconia
Nigrita	Νιγρίτα	Serres
Nikaia	Νίκαια	Piraeus
Nikaia		Larissa
Nikiforos	Νικηφόρος	Drama
Nikiforos Fokas	Νικηφόρος Φωκάς	Rethymno
Nikos Kazantzakis	Νίκος Καζαντζάκης	Heraklion
Nileas		Euboea
Nisyros	Νίσυρος	Dodecanese
North Kynouria	Βόρεια Κυνουρία	Arcadia
Nymfaio		Florina
Oia	Οία	Cyclades
Oichalia		Messenia
Oichalia		Trikala
Oiniades		Aetolia-Acarnania
Oinofyta	Οινόφυτα	Boeotia
Oinoi	Οινόη	West Attica
Oinountas		Laconia
Oinousses	Οινούσες	Chios
Oitylo	Οίτυλο	Laconia
Oleni		Elis
Olenia		Achaea
Olympia	Ολυμπία	Elis
Olympos		Dodecanese
Olympos		Larissa
Omala		Kefalonia
Omiroupoli		Chios
Opountioi		Phthiotis
Oraiokastro		Thessaloniki
Orchomenos	Ορχομενός	Boeotia
Oreini		Serres
Oreino		Kavala
Oreoi		Euboea
Orestiada	Ορεστιάδα	Evros
Orfani		Kavala
Orfeas		Evros
Organi		Rhodope
Ormylia		Chalkidiki
Oropedio Lasithiou	Οροπέδιο Λασιθίου	Lasithi
Oropioi		East Attica
Othonoi		Corfu
Paia	Πάϊα	Achaea
Paiania	Παιανία	East Attica
Palaia Fokaia		East Attica
Palaio Faliro	Παλαιό Φάληρο	Athens
Palaiokastritsa	Παλαιοκαστρίτσα	Corfu
Palamas	Παλαμάς	Karditsa
Paliani		Heraklion
Paliki		Kefalonia
Paliokastro		Trikala
Pallini	Παλλήνη	East Attica
Pallini		Chalkidiki
Pamisos		Karditsa
Pamvotida		Ioannina
Panagia		Chalkidiki
Panaitoliko		Aetolia-Acarnania
Pangaio		Kavala
Panorama	Πανόραμα	Thessaloniki
Panormos	Πάνορμος	Cyclades
Papaflessas		Messenia
Papagou	Παπάγου	Athens
Papigko	Πάπιγκο	Ioannina
Parakampylia		Aetolia-Acarnania
Paralia		Achaea
Paralia		Pieria
Paralithaioi		Trikala
Paramythia		Thesprotia
Paranesti		Drama
Parapotamos		Thesprotia
Paravola		Aetolia-Acarnania
Parelioi		Corfu
Parga	Πάργα	Preveza
Parnassos	Παρνασσός	Phocis
Paros	Πάρος	Cyclades
Pasaronas		Ioannina
Patmos	Πάτμος	Dodecanese
Patras	Πάτρα	Achaea
Pavliani		Phthiotis
Paxoi	Παξοί	Corfu
Pefka		Thessaloniki
Pefki	Πεύκη	Athens
Pelasgia		Phthiotis
Pelekanos		Chania
Pelinnaioi		Trikala
Pella	Πέλλα	Pella
Pellana		Laconia
Pentalofos		Kozani
Penteli	Πεντέλη	Athens
Perama		Ioannina
Perama	Πέραμα	Piraeus
Perasma		Florina
Perdika	Πέρδικα	Thesprotia
Peristeri	Περιστέρι	Athens
Perivoli	Περιβόλι	Grevena
Peta		Arta
Petalidi		Messenia
Petaloudes	Πεταλούδες	Dodecanese
Petra	Πέτρα	Lesbos
Petra	Πέτρα	Pieria
Petritsi		Serres
Petroupoli	Πετρούπολη	Athens
Pialeia		Trikala
Piereis		Kavala
Pierioi	Πιέριοι	Pieria
Pikermi	Πικέρμι	East Attica
Pikrolimni	Πικρολίμνη	Kilkis
Pineia		Elis
Piraeus	Πειραιάς	Piraeus
Plastiras	Πλαστήρας	Karditsa
Plataies	Πλαταιές	Boeotia
Platanias		Chania
Platanos		Aetolia-Acarnania
Platy	Πλατύ	Imathia
Platykampos	Πλατύκαμπος	Larissa
Plomari	Πλωμάρι	Lesbos
Pogoniani		Ioannina
Polichni	Πολίχνη	Thessaloniki
Polichnitos		Lesbos
Polydamantas	Πολυδάμαντας	Larissa
Polydendri		East Attica
Polygyros	Πολύγυρος	Chalkidiki
Polykastro	Πολύκαστρο	Kilkis
Poros	Πόρος	Piraeus
Portaria		Magnesia
Poseidonia		Cyclades
Potamia		Evrytania
Potamia		Larissa
Pramanta		Ioannina
Prespes	Πρέσπες	Florina
Preveza	Πρέβεζα	Preveza
Promachonas		Serres
Prosotsani		Drama
Proti		Serres
Prousos	Προυσός	Evrytania
Psara	Ψαρρά	Chios
Psychiko	Ψυχικό	Athens
Pteleos		Magnesia
Ptolemaida	Πτολεμαΐδα	Kozani
Pydna		Pieria
Pylaia		Thessaloniki
Pylaros		Kefalonia
Pyli		Trikala
Pyllini		Aetolia-Acarnania
Pylos	Πύλος	Messenia
Pindos		Trikala
Pyrgos	Πύργος	Elis
Pythagoreio	Πυθαγόρειο	Samos
Raches	Ράχες	Samos
Rafina	Ραφήνα	East Attica
Rentina		Karditsa
Rentina		Thessaloniki
Rethymno	Ρέθυμνο	Rethymno
Rhodes (city)	Ρόδος	Dodecanese
Rio	Ρίο	Achaea
Rodolivos		Serres
Rodopoli	Ροδόπολη	East Attica
Rouvas	Ρούβας	Heraklion
Sagiada		Thesprotia
Salamina (city)	Σαλαμίνα	Piraeus
Samarina		Grevena
Sami		Kefalonia
Samothrace	Σαμοθράκη	Evros
Santorini	Σαντορίνη, Θήρα	Cyclades
Sapes		Rhodope
Sarantaporo		Larissa
Saronida		East Attica
Saronikos	Σαρωνικός	Corinthia
Satres		Xanthi
Schimatari		Boeotia
Schoinoussa		Cyclades
Selero		Xanthi
Sellana		Karditsa
Selloi		Ioannina
Serifos		Cyclades
Serres	Σέρρες	Serres
Servia		Kozani
Sfakia	Σφακιά	Chania
Sfakiotes		Lefkada
Siatista	Σιάτιστα	Kozani
Sidirokastro	Σιδηρόκαστρο	Serres
Sidironero	Σιδηρόνερο	Drama
Sifnos	Σίφνος	Cyclades
Sikinos	Σίκινος	Cyclades
Sikyona		Corinthia
Sipiada		Magnesia
Sitagroi		Drama
Sithonia		Chalkidiki
Sitia	Σητεία	Lasithi
Sivritos		Rethymno
Skala	Σκάλα	Laconia
Skiathos	Σκιάθος	Magnesia
Skillounta		Elis
Skiritida		Arcadia
Skopelos	Σκόπελος	Magnesia
Skotousa		Serres
Skoutari		Serres
Skydra		Pella
Skyros	Σκύρος	Euboea
Sminos		Laconia
Smixi		Grevena
Sochos		Thessaloniki
Sofades		Karditsa
Solygeia		Corinthia
Sostis		Rhodope
Souda	Σούδα	Chania
Soufli	Σουφλί	Evros
Souli	Σούλι	Thesprotia
Sourpi		Magnesia
South Rhodes		Dodecanese
Sparti	Σπάρτη	Laconia
Spata-Loutsa	Σπάτα	East Attica
Spercheiada	Σπερχειάδα	Phthiotis
Spetses	Σπέτσες	Piraeus
Stagira-Akanthos		Chalkidiki
Stamata		East Attica
Stavroupoli		Thessaloniki
Stavroupoli		Xanthi
Stratos		Aetolia-Acarnania
Strymonas		Serres
Strymoniko		Serres
Stylida	Στυλίδα	Phthiotis
Stymfalia	Στυμφαλία	Corinthia
Styra		Euboea
Sykamino		East Attica
Sykies		Thessaloniki
Symi	Σύμη	Dodecanese
Sympoliteia		Achaea
Syrrako	Συρράκο	Ioannina
Syvota	Σύβοτα	Thesprotia
Tamasio		Karditsa
Tamyneoi		Euboea
Tanagra	Τανάγρα	Boeotia
Tavros	Ταύρος	Athens
Tegea	Τεγέα	Arcadia
Temenos	Τέμενος	Heraklion
Tenea		Corinthia
Tetrafylia		Arta
Thasos	Θάσος	Kavala
Thebes	Θήβα	Boeotia
Theodoriana		Arta
Theodoros Ziakas		Grevena
Therapnes		Laconia
Theriso	Θέρισο	Chania
Thermaikos	Θερμαϊκός	Thessaloniki
Thermes		Xanthi
Thermi		Thessaloniki
Thermo		Aetolia-Acarnania
Thespies		Boeotia
Thesprotiko		Preveza
Thessaliotida		Phthiotis
Thessaloniki	Θεσσαλονίκη	Thessaloniki
Thestieis		Aetolia-Acarnania
Thinali		Corfu
Thisvi		Boeotia
Thouria		Messenia
Thrakomakedones	Θρακομακεδόνες	East Attica
Thrapsano	Θραψανό	Heraklion
Tilos		Dodecanese
Tinos	Τήνος	Cyclades
Tithorea		Phthiotis
Tolofon	Τολοφών	Phocis
Topeiros		Xanthi
Toroni		Chalkidiki
Tragano		Elis
Tragilos		Serres
Traianoupoli		Evros
Triandria	Τριανδρία	Thessaloniki
Triglia		Chalkidiki
Trigono		Evros
Trikala	Τρίκαλα	Trikala
Trikeri	Τρικέρι	Magnesia
Trikolonoi		Arcadia
Trikorfo	Τρίκορφο	Messenia
Tripoli	Τρίπολη	Arcadia
Tripyla		Messenia
Tritaia		Achaea
Troizina	Τροιζήνα	Piraeus
Tropaia	Τρόπαια	Arcadia
Tsaritsani	Τσαριτσάνη	Larissa
Tsotyli		Kozani
Tychero		Evros
Tylisos		Heraklion
Tymfaia		Trikala
Tymfi		Ioannina
Tymfristos		Phthiotis
Tympaki	Τυμπάκι	Heraklion
Tyrnavos	Τύρναβος	Larissa
Tyros	Τυρός	Arcadia
Tzoumerka	Τζουμέρκα	Ioannina
Vagia		Boeotia
Valtetsi	Βαλτέτσι	Arcadia
Vamos	Βάμος	Chania
Vardousia		Phocis
Vari	Βάρη	East Attica
Varnavas		East Attica
Variko		Florina
Vartholomio		Elis
Vasilika		Thessaloniki
Vasiliki		Trikala
Vathy	Βαθύ	Samos
Vathypedo		Ioannina
Vegoritida		Pella
Velo		Corinthia
Velventos		Kozani
Ventzio		Grevena
Verdikoussa		Larissa
Vergina	Βεργίνα	Imathia
Vermio		Kozani
Veroia	Βέροια	Imathia
Vertiskos		Thessaloniki
Viannos	Βιάννος	Heraklion
Vilia		West Attica
Viniani		Evrytania
Visaltia		Serres
Vistonida	Βιστωνίδα	Xanthi
Vitsi	Βίτσι	Kastoria
Vlacherna		Arta
Vlasti		Kozani
Vocha		Corinthia
Voies		Laconia
Volakas		Elis
Volos	Βόλος	Magnesia
Voufrades		Messenia
Voukolies		Chania
Voula	Βούλα	East Attica
Vouliagmeni	Βουλιαγμένη	East Attica
Vouprasia		Elis
Vovousa		Ioannina
Vrachasi	Βραχάσι	Lasithi
Vrachnaiika		Achaea
Vrilissia	Βριλήσσια	Athens
Vyronas	Βύρωνας	Athens
Vytina	Βυτίνα	Arcadia
Vyssa		Evros
Xanthi	Ξάνθη	Xanthi
Xirovouni		Arta
Xylokastro	Ξυλόκαστρο	Corinthia
Xyniada		Phthiotis
Ydrousa	Υδρούσα	Cyclades
Ymittos	Υμηττός	Athens
Ypati	Υπάτη	Phthiotis
Zacharo	Ζαχάρω	Elis
Zagora	Ζαγορά	Magnesia
Zakynthos (city)	Ζάκυνθος	Zakynthos
Zalongo	Ζάλογγο	Preveza
Zarakas	Ζάρακας	Laconia
Zaros	Ζαρός	Heraklion
Zefyri	Ζεφύρι	West Attica
Zervochoria	Ζερβοχώρια	Chalkidiki
Zitsa	Ζίτσα	Ioannina
Zografou	Ζωγράφου	Athens
Zoniana	Ζωνιανά	Rethymno

== See also ==
- List of settlements in Achaea
- List of settlements in Aetolia-Acarnania
- List of settlements in Arcadia
- List of settlements in Argolis
- List of settlements in the Arta regional unit
- List of settlements in Attica
- List of settlements in Boeotia
- List of settlements in Cephalonia
- List of settlements in Chalkidiki
- List of settlements in the Chania regional unit
- List of settlements in the Chios regional unit
- List of settlements in the Corfu regional unit
- List of settlements in Corinthia
- List of settlements in the Cyclades
- List of settlements in the Dodecanese
- List of settlements in the Drama regional unit
- List of settlements in Elis
- List of settlements in the Euboea regional unit
- List of settlements in the Evros regional unit
- List of settlements in Evrytania
- List of settlements in the Florina regional unit
- List of settlements in the Grevena regional unit
- List of settlements in the Heraklion regional unit
- List of settlements in the Ikaria regional unit
- List of settlements in Imathia
- List of settlements in the Ioannina regional unit
- List of settlements in the Karditsa regional unit
- List of settlements in the Kastoria regional unit
- List of settlements in the Kavala regional unit
- List of settlements in the Kilkis regional unit
- List of settlements in the Kozani regional unit
- List of settlements in Laconia
- List of settlements in the Larissa regional unit
- List of settlements in Lasithi
- List of settlements in the Lefkada regional unit
- List of settlements in the Lemnos regional unit
- List of settlements in Lesbos
- List of settlements in the Magnesia regional unit
- List of settlements in Messenia
- List of settlements in the Pella regional unit
- List of settlements in Phocis
- List of settlements in Phthiotis
- List of settlements in the Pieria regional unit
- List of settlements in the Preveza regional unit
- List of settlements in the Rethymno regional unit
- List of settlements in the Rhodope regional unit
- List of settlements in Samos
- List of settlements in the Serres regional unit
- List of settlements in Thesprotia
- List of settlements in the Thessaloniki regional unit
- List of settlements in the Trikala regional unit
- List of settlements in the Xanthi regional unit
- List of settlements in Zakynthos
