= Ilias Chouzouris =

Greek footballer

Personal information
- Date of birth: 25 February 1975 (age 51)
- Place of birth: Filoti, Greece
- Height: 1.80 m (5 ft 11 in)
- Position: Defender

Youth career
- Filoti

Senior career*
Years	Team	Apps	(Gls)
-1993	Filoti		
1993	Pannaxiakos		
1993–2002	Proodeftiki	100	(0)
2002–2003	Ethnikos Asteras	27	(0)
2003–2004	Paphos		
2004	Kerkyra		
2005–2006	Ethnikos Asteras	19	(0)
2006–2007	Ilioupoli		
2007–2008	Aias Salamina		
2008–2009	Vyzas		
2014–2015	Kryoneri	6	(0)
- Agios Stefanos
- Anoixi
2020	Filoti	1	

International career
1999	Greek military		

Managerial career
- 2014–2015: Kryoneri (youth)
- Agios Stefanos (youth)
- Anoixi (youth)
- 2016-: Panathinaikos (academies network)
- 2021: Aspropyrgos (assistant general manager)
- * Club domestic league appearances and goals

Ilias Chouzouris (Greek: Ηλίας Χουζούρης; born 26 February 1975) is a retired Greek football defender.
