= Attica (disambiguation) =

Attica is an historical region of Greece.

Attica may also refer to:

- Attica (region), a modern administrative region of Greece
- Attica Prefecture, a former prefecture of Central Greece
- Attica Province, a former province of Greece
- Attica (constituency), a former electoral district of Greece

== Other places ==
=== United States ===
- Attica, Georgia
- Attica, Indiana
- Attica, Iowa
- Attica, Kansas
- Attica, Michigan
- Attica Township, Michigan
- Attica, New York
- Attica (village), New York
- Attica, Ohio
- Attica, Wisconsin

=== Elsewhere ===
- Attica, Saskatchewan, Canada

== Attica prison uprising ==
- Attica Correctional Facility, a maximum security prison in Upstate New York
- Attica Prison uprising of 1971
- Attica (1974 film), a documentary film by Cinda Firestone
- Attica (1980 film), a television film
- Attica (2021 film), a documentary film

== Other uses ==
- Attica!, a 2014 album by Wussy
- Attica (automobiles), a Greek manufacturer of microcars
- Attica (novel), a novel by the British writer Garry Kilworth
- Attica (restaurant), a restaurant owned and operated by chef Ben Shewry
- 1138 Attica, an asteroid
