= Konstantinos Michalos =

Greek businessman

- Born: 1960; Greece
- Died: August 6, 2021 (aged 60–61); Kryoneri, Attica, Greece
- Education: University of Essex, London School of Economics
- Occupation: Businessman
- Children: 4
- Father: Christos Michalos

Konstantinos Michalos (1960 – 2021) was a Greek businessman who served as president of the Athens Chamber of Commerce and Industry (ACCI).

== Early life ==
Michalos was born in 1960 and was the son of industrialist and politician Christos Michalos (who held important political and administrative positions during the Greek period of dictatorial governments 1967–1973). He studied economics and political science at the University of Essex (UK) and completed postgraduate studies in economic applications at the London School of Economics.

== Career ==
In 1988, he took over the management of the family company SWAN S.A. In 1993, he was elected member of the Board of directors of ACCI and in 2006, its president. In 2002, he was elected member of the board of directors of the Arab-Hellenic Chamber of Commerce and in 2004 its vice-president, while in 2003 he was elected president of the Association of Enterprises of North Attica. During the period 2004–2005, he served as a special advisor to the Ministry of Development. During the period 2005–2006, he served as Secretary General of the Ministry of Economy and Finance, and in 2007 he was elected member of the board of directors of PPC. In 2008 he was elected member of the board of directors of OTE. In December 2011 he was re-elected president of ACCI for 4 years and in March 2012 he was elected president of KEEE (Central Union of Hellenic Chambers).

He was a member of the board of directors of Athens Airport "Eleftherios Venizelos" from November 2012 to May 2015, as well as a member of the board of directors of "Astir Palace Hotel S.A." from June 2012 to July 2017. In 2013 he co-founded Michalos Konstantinos & Co P.C. (M Trading Group) of which he was co-manager.

== Personal life and death ==
He was the father of 4 children and spoke Greek, English and French.

He died on August 6, 2021, at the age of 61 at his office in Kryoneri, Attica from a heart attack.
