= Athens ERA-1 transmitter =

Transmission tower in Agios Stefanos, Attica, Greece

Athens ERA-1 Transmitter
- Location within Greece
- Location: Agios Stefanos, Attica, Greece
- Coordinates: 38°9′1″N 23°51′37″E
- Local TV service: ERA-1

Athens ERA-1 Transmitter is a transmission tower in Agios Stefanos, Attica, Greece.

The facility broadcasts the program of ERA-1 on 729 kHz with 150 kW in the standard mediumwave band. Athens ERA-1 transmitter uses as an antenna a 210 metres tall mast radiator insulated against ground, which is a lattice structure with triangular cross section.
