= 1138 Attica =

Main-belt asteroid

Discovery
- Discovered by: K. Reinmuth
- Discovery site: Heidelberg Obs.
- Discovery date: 22 November 1929

Designations
- Pronunciation: /ˈætɪkə/
- Named after: Attica Province (province of Greece)
- Alternative designations: 1929 WF · 1954 GK
- Minor planet category: main-belt · (outer)

Orbital characteristics
- Epoch 16 February 2017 (JD 2457800.5)
- Uncertainty parameter 0
- Observation arc: 86.52 yr (31,600 days)
- Aphelion: 3.3801 AU
- Perihelion: 2.9104 AU
- Semi-major axis: 3.1453 AU
- Eccentricity: 0.0747
- Orbital period (sidereal): 5.58 yr (2,037 days)
- Mean anomaly: 249.74°
- Mean motion: 0° 10^{m} 36.12^{s} / day
- Inclination: 13.971°
- Longitude of ascending node: 283.50°
- Argument of perihelion: 107.03°

Physical characteristics
- Dimensions: 23.681±0.113 km 30±2 km (generic)
- Synodic rotation period: unknown
- Geometric albedo: 0.105±0.018
- Absolute magnitude (H): 11.4

1138 Attica, provisional designation 1929 WF, is an asteroid from the outer region of the asteroid belt, approximately 24 kilometers in diameter. It was discovered on 22 November 1929, by German astronomer Karl Reinmuth at Heidelberg Observatory in southwest Germany. It was named after the Attica Province in Greece.

== Orbit and classification ==
Attica orbits the Sun in the outer main-belt at a distance of 2.9–3.4 AU once every 5 years and 7 months (2,037 days). Its orbit has an eccentricity of 0.07 and an inclination of 14° with respect to the ecliptic. The body's observation arc begins at Heidelberg with its official discovery observation. No precoveries were taken, and no prior identifications were made.

== Physical characteristics ==
According to the survey carried out by NASA's Wide-field Infrared Survey Explorer with its subsequent NEOWISE mission, Attica measures 23.681 kilometers in diameter and its surface has an albedo of 0.105. Based on a generic magnitude-to-diameter conversion, its diameter is between 13 and 32 kilometer for an absolute magnitude of 11.4 and an assumed albedo in the range of 0.05 to 0.25. Since asteroids in the outer main-belt are typically of carbonaceous rather than stony composition, with averaged standard albedos of 0.057, Attica's diameter can be estimated to measure close to 30 kilometers, as the lower a body's albedo (reflectivity), the larger its diameter at a fixed absolute magnitude (brightness).

As of 2017, Attica's spectral type, as well as its rotation period and shape remain unknown. This is rather unusual, as both spectral type and rotation period have been determined for most larger and low-numbered asteroids (also see minor-planet lists from 1 up to 2000).

== Naming ==
This minor planet is named after the province of Attica in eastern Greece with the capital Athens. Naming citation was first mentioned in The Names of the Minor Planets by Paul Herget in 1955 (H 102).
