= East Attica =

East Attica Περιφερειακή ενότητα Ανατολικής Αττικής
- Regional unit
- Municipalities of East Attica

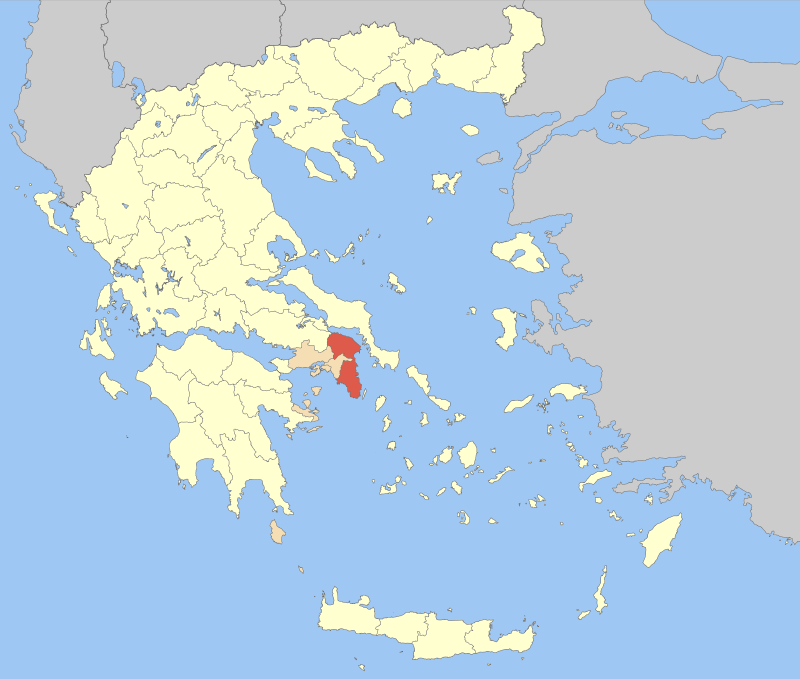
- East Attica within Greece

- Location within Greece
- Coordinates: 38°0′N 23°57′E
- Country: Greece
- Administrative region: Attica
- Seat: Pallini

Area
  - Total: 1,513 km^{2} (584 sq mi)

Population (2021)
  - Total: 518,755
  - Density: 342.9/km^{2} (888.0/sq mi)
- Time zone: UTC+2 (EET)
  - Summer (DST): UTC+3 (EEST)
- Postal code: 1xx xx
- Area code: 210, 22910-22940, 22990
- Vehicle registration: ΖΧ

East Attica (Greek: Ανατολική Αττική) is one of the regional units of Greece. It is part of the region of Attica. The regional unit covers the eastern part of the urban agglomeration of Athens, and also the rural area to its east.

== Administration ==
The regional unit East Attica is subdivided into 13 municipalities. These are (number as in the map in the infobox):

- Acharnes (2)
- Dionysos (4)
- Kropia (5)
- Lavreotiki (6)
- Marathon (Marathonas, 7)
- Markopoulo Mesogaias (8)
- Oropos (13)
- Paiania (9)
- Pallini (1)
- Rafina-Pikermi (10)
- Saronikos (11)
- Spata-Artemida (12)
- Vari-Voula-Vouliagmeni (3)

With respect to parliamentary elections East Attica belongs to the electoral district of Attica.

=== Prefecture ===
As a part of the 2011 Kallikratis government reform, the regional unit East Attica was created out of the former prefecture East Attica (Greek: νομαρχία Ανατολικής Αττικής). The prefecture had the same territory as the present regional unit. At the same time, the municipalities were reorganised, according to the table below.

New municipality	Old municipalities	Seat
Acharnes	Acharnes	Acharnes
Acharnes	Thrakomakedones	Acharnes
Dionysos	Dionysos	Agios Stefanos
Dionysos	Agios Stefanos	Agios Stefanos
Dionysos	Anoixi	Agios Stefanos
Dionysos	Drosia	Agios Stefanos
Dionysos	Kryoneri	Agios Stefanos
Dionysos	Rodopoli	Agios Stefanos
Dionysos	Stamata	Agios Stefanos
Kropia	Kropia	Koropi
Lavreotiki	Lavreotiki	Laurium
Lavreotiki	Agios Konstantinos	Laurium
Lavreotiki	Keratea	Laurium
Marathon	Marathon	Marathon
Marathon	Grammatiko	Marathon
Marathon	Nea Makri	Marathon
Marathon	Varnavas	Marathon
Markopoulo Mesogaias	Markopoulo Mesogaias	Markopoulo
Oropos	Afidnes	Oropos
Oropos	Avlona	Oropos
Oropos	Kalamos	Oropos
Oropos	Kapandriti	Oropos
Oropos	Malakasa	Oropos
Oropos	Markopoulo Oropou	Oropos
Oropos	Oropioi	Oropos
Oropos	Polydendri	Oropos
Oropos	Sykamino	Oropos
Paiania	Paiania	Paiania
Paiania	Glyka Nera	Paiania
Pallini	Pallini	Gerakas
Pallini	Anthousa	Gerakas
Pallini	Gerakas	Gerakas
Rafina-Pikermi	Rafina	Rafina
Rafina-Pikermi	Pikermi	Rafina
Saronikos	Anavyssos	Kalyvia Thorikou
Saronikos	Kalyvia Thorikou	Kalyvia Thorikou
Saronikos	Kouvaras	Kalyvia Thorikou
Saronikos	Palaia Fokaia	Kalyvia Thorikou
Saronikos	Saronida	Kalyvia Thorikou
Spata-Artemida	Artemida	Spata
Spata-Artemida	Spata-Loutsa	Spata
Vari-Voula-Vouliagmeni	Vari	Voula
Vari-Voula-Vouliagmeni	Voula	Voula
Vari-Voula-Vouliagmeni	Vouliagmeni	Voula

=== Provinces ===
Before the abolishment of the provinces of Greece in 2006, part of the East Attica prefecture was in the Attica Province, which also covered part of West Attica.

== See also ==
- List of settlements in Attica
