= Attica Province =

Attica Province Επαρχία Αττικής
- Province of Greece
- 2006
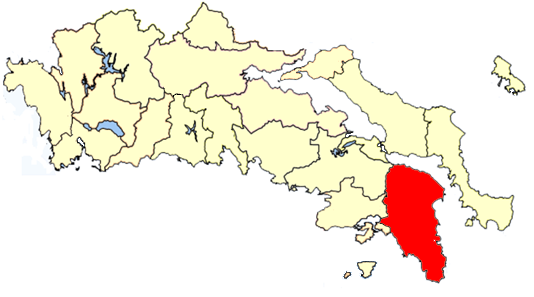
- Area
  - Coordinates: 37°57′14″N 23°56′27″E

The province of Attica (Greek: Επαρχία Αττικής) was one of the provinces of Attica, Greece. It consisted of parts of the East Attica and West Attica prefectures. Its territory corresponded with that of the current municipalities Acharnes, Dionysos, Kropia, Lavreotiki, Marathon, Markopoulo Mesogaias, Oropos, Paiania, Pallini (except the municipal unit Gerakas), Rafina-Pikermi, Saronikos, Spata-Artemida and Fyli. It was abolished in 2006.
