= Afidnes =

Afidnes Αφίδνες
- Municipal unit
- Location within the regional unit

- Location within Greece
- Coordinates: 38°12′N 23°50′E
- Country: Greece
- Administrative region: Attica
- Regional unit: East Attica
- Municipality: Oropos

Area
  - Municipal unit: 34.638 km^{2} (13.374 sq mi)
- Elevation: 361 m (1,184 ft)

Population (2021)
  - Municipal unit: 3,739
  - Municipal unit density: 107.9/km^{2} (279.6/sq mi)
- Time zone: UTC+2 (EET)
  - Summer (DST): UTC+3 (EEST)
- Postal code: 190 14
- Area code: 22920
- Vehicle registration: Z

Afidnes (Greek: Αφίδνες, Ancient Greek: Ἄφιδνα or Ἀφίδναι, from the Middle Ages until 1919: Κιούρκα - Kiourka) is a small town in East Attica, Greece. Since the 2011 local government reform it is part of the municipality Oropos, of which it is a municipal unit. The municipal unit has an area of 34.638 km^{2}. It is situated in the eastern foothills of the Parnitha mountains, 3 km southwest of Polydendri, 5 km southeast of Malakasa and 27 km north of Athens city centre. Afidnes has a station on the railway from Athens to Thessaloniki. The A1 motorway (Athens - Lamia - Thessaloniki) passes east of the town. It is part of Athens metropolitan area.

Ancient Aphidna was one of the twelve ancient towns of Attica. In Greek mythology, Aphidna was the place where Theseus left Helen after he had abducted her. The archaeological site of Aphidnae is small. It was excavated in the 19th century. 13 Middle Helladic tumuli have been found.

== Settlements ==
The municipal unit Afidnes consists of the following settlements:

- Afidnes (2021 census pop. 2,422)
- Agía Triada (995)
- Drosopigi (164)
- Kosmothea (158)

== Historical population ==
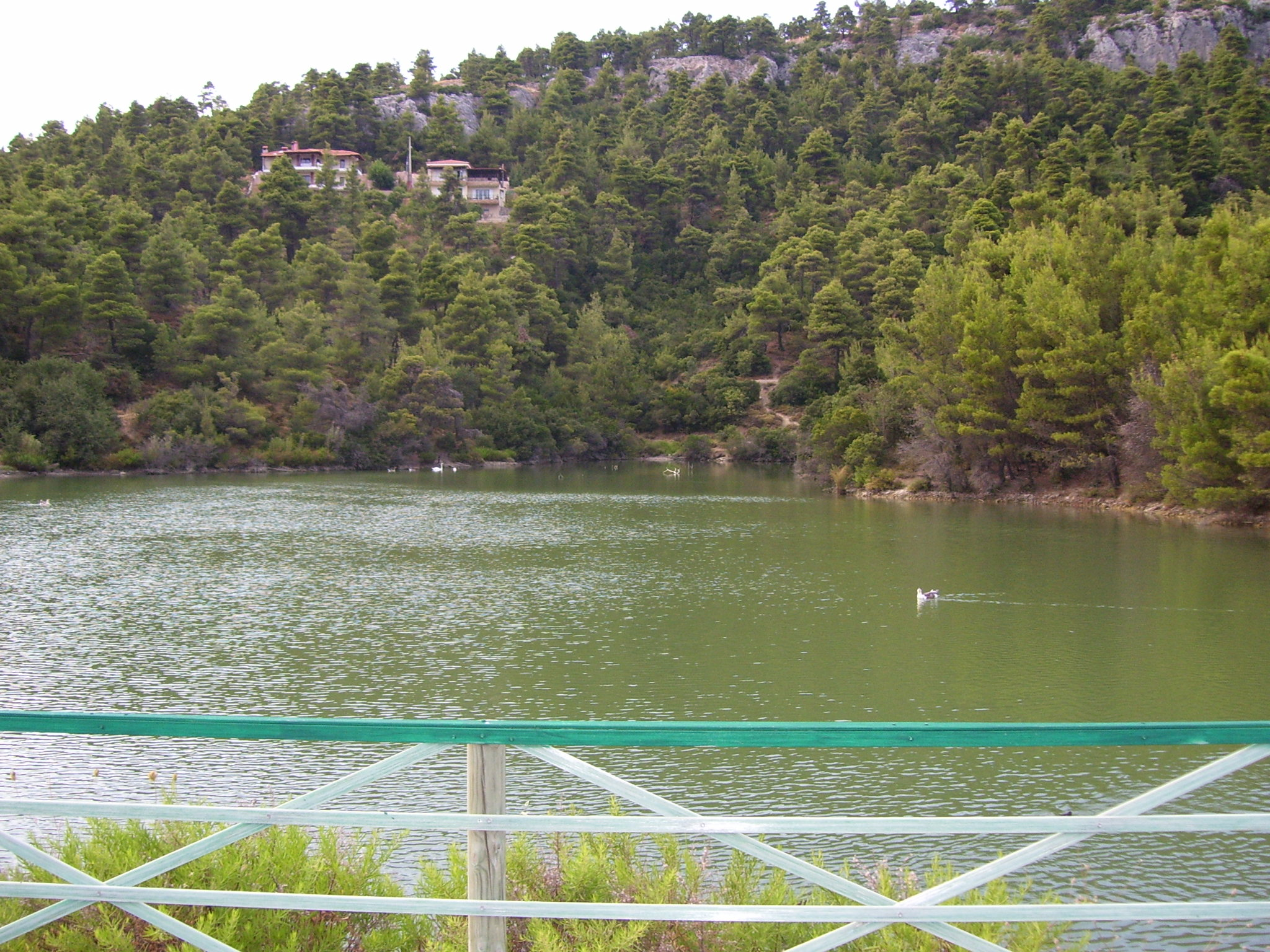
Beletsi Lake

Markopoulou has historically been an Arvanite settlement.

Year	Village population	Community population
1981	-	1,301
1991	1,079	1,504
2001	1,736	2,543
2011	1,908	3,642
2021	2,422	3,739

== Places of interest ==
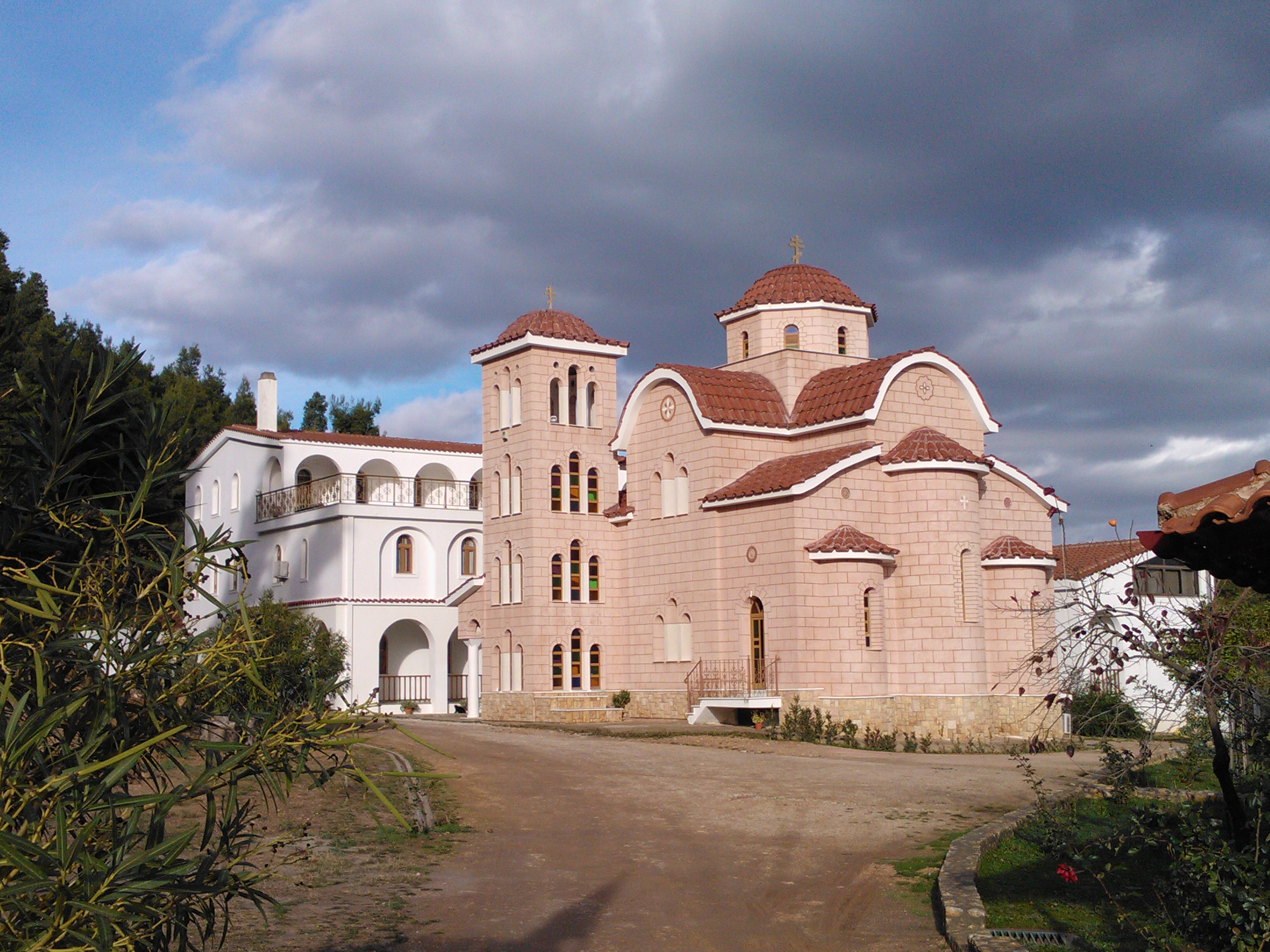
Monastery of Holy Angels in Afidnes

- Beletsi Lake, a small lake on the east slopes of Parnitha, near Afidnes. It is important place for migratory birds.
- Monastery of Holy Angels, modern monastery near Afidnes

== Persons ==
- Callistratus of Aphidnae, an ancient Archon of Athens.
- Callimachus, the Athenian Polemarch at the Battle of Marathon.

== See also ==
- List of municipalities of Attica
