= Drosia =

Drosia Δροσιά
- Municipal unit
- Location within the regional unit

- Location within Greece
- Coordinates: 38°7′N 23°51′E
- Country: Greece
- Administrative region: Attica
- Regional unit: East Attica
- Municipality: Dionysos

Area
  - Municipal unit: 2.201 km^{2} (0.850 sq mi)
- Elevation: 370 m (1,210 ft)

Population (2021)
  - Municipal unit: 7,837
  - Municipal unit density: 3,561/km^{2} (9,222/sq mi)
- Time zone: UTC+2 (EET)
  - Summer (DST): UTC+3 (EEST)
- Postal code: 145 72
- Area code: 210
- Vehicle registration: Z
- Website: www.drosia.gr

Drosia (Greek: Δροσιά, meaning "dew", before 1947: Ρωσσοχώρι - Rossochori) is a town in the East Attica regional unit and a suburb of the Athens agglomeration, Attica, Greece. Since the 2011 local government reform it is part of the municipality Dionysos, of which it is a municipal unit.

Drosia is a mainly residential suburb, known for its location in the midst of evergreen pine forests. During the extreme heat of Greek summers, many people from the whole Athens urban area drive up to Drosia on the weekends, seeking cool and shade in the taverns, cafes and one outdoor cinema theater, for which the area is known.

== Geography ==
Drosia is situated in the hills in the northeastern part of the Athens conurbation, at about 370 m elevation. The municipal unit has an area of 2.201 km^{2}. It lies at the northwestern foot of the Penteliko Mountain. It is 1 km southwest of Stamata, 3 km northeast of Ekali, 3 km south of Agios Stefanos and 19 km northeast of Athens city centre. Its built-up area is continuous with those of the neighbouring suburbs Stamata, Rodopoli, Dionysos and Ekali. Greek National Road 83 (Athens - Marathon - Rafina) passes through Drosia.

== History ==
A former rural village, Drosia started growing with the arrival of refugees from Pontus after the Greco-Turkish War of 1919-1922. Originally named Rossochori, it was renamed to Drosia in 1947. It was part of the community of Stamata until 1950, when it became a separate community.

== Historical population ==
Year	Population
1981	1,403
1991	3,026
2001	5,865
2011	7,186
2021	7,837

== See also ==
- List of municipalities of Attica
