= Varnavas =

Varnavas Βαρνάβας
- Municipal unit
- Location within the regional unit

- Location within Greece
- Coordinates: 38°13′N 23°55′E
- Country: Greece
- Administrative region: Attica
- Regional unit: East Attica
- Municipality: Marathon

Area
  - Municipal unit: 37.349 km^{2} (14.421 sq mi)
- Elevation: 453 m (1,486 ft)

Population (2021)
  - Municipal unit: 1,771
  - Municipal unit density: 47.42/km^{2} (122.8/sq mi)
- Time zone: UTC+2 (EET)
  - Summer (DST): UTC+3 (EEST)
- Postal code: 190 14
- Area code: 22950
- Vehicle registration: ZX

Varnavas (Greek: Βαρνάβας "Barnabas") is a town in East Attica, Greece. Since the 2011 local government reform it is part of the municipality Marathon, of which it is a municipal unit. It is part of Athens metropolitan area.

On 11 Aug 2024, a large wildfire in Varnavas caused smoke over Athens.

== Geography ==
Varnavas is situated in the hills of northeastern Attica. The main land use is agriculture. The nearest towns are Kapandriti (4 km west) and Grammatiko (4 km southeast). It is 8 km northwest of Marathon and 32 km northeast of the center of Athens. Landmarks include the Historic People's Museum of Varnavas (Istoriko Laografiko Mouseio Varnava).

The municipal unit has a land area of 37.349 km^{2} (14 sq mi) and a total population of 1,771 inhabitants (2021). Its other settlements are Agía Paraskeví, Ágioi Dimítrios kai Panteleímon, Moní Metamorfóseos Sotíros, Ágios Ioánnis, Pouríthi, Moní Panagías, and Limniónas.

== Historical population ==
Varnavas has historically been an Arvanite settlement.

Year	Village population	Community population
1981	1,130	-
1991	1,170	1,404
2001	1,425	1,722
2011	1,326	2,081
2021	1,342	1,771
