= Grammatiko =

Grammatiko Γραμματικό
- Municipal unit
- Location within the regional unit

- Location within Greece
- Coordinates: 38°12′N 23°58′E
- Country: Greece
- Administrative region: Attica
- Regional unit: East Attica
- Municipality: Marathon

Area
  - Municipal unit: 51.674 km^{2} (19.951 sq mi)
- Elevation: 211 m (692 ft)

Population (2021)
  - Municipal unit: 1,383
  - Municipal unit density: 26.76/km^{2} (69.32/sq mi)
- Time zone: UTC+2 (EET)
  - Summer (DST): UTC+3 (EEST)
- Postal code: 190 07
- Area code: 22940
- Vehicle registration: Z

Grammatiko (Greek: Γραμματικό) is a village in East Attica, Greece. Since the 2011 local government reform it is part of the municipality Marathon, of which it is a municipal unit. It is part of the Athens metropolitan area.

== Geography ==
Grammatiko is situated in the hills of the northeastern part of the Attica peninsula, 6 km from the South Euboean Gulf coast, at about 210 m elevation. It is 4 km southeast of Varnavas, 5 km north of Marathon and 32 km northeast of Athens city centre. The municipal unit Grammatiko consists of the villages Grammatiko, Agia Marina and Sesi. It has an area of 51.674 km^{2}.

Helios Airways Flight 522 crashed in the hills near Grammatiko on 14 August 2005 after a lack of cabin pressure incapacitated the aircraft's crew members.

== Historical population ==
Grammatiko has historically been an Arvanite settlement.

Year	Village population	Community population
1981	-	1,236
1991	1,177	1,498
2001	1,284	1,443
2011	1,432	1,823
2021	1,297	1,383
