= Nea Penteli =

Nea Penteli Νέα Πεντέλη
- Municipal unit
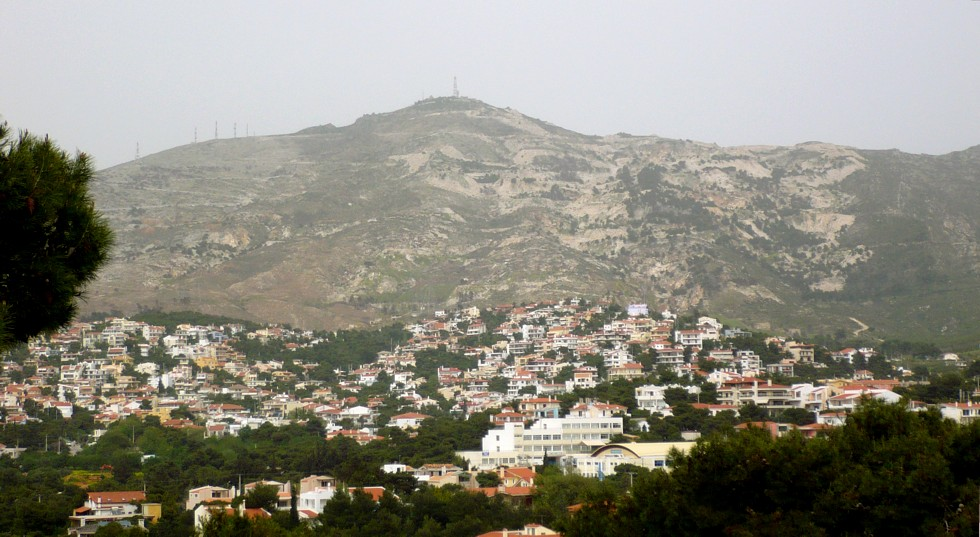

- Location within Athens

- Location within Greece
- Coordinates: 38°3′N 23°51′E
- Country: Greece
- Administrative region: Attica
- Regional unit: North Athens
- Municipality: Penteli

Area
  - Municipal unit: 3.230 km^{2} (1.247 sq mi)
- Elevation: 430–520 m (1,410–1,710 ft)

Population (2021)
  - Municipal unit: 6,916
  - Municipal unit density: 2,141/km^{2} (5,546/sq mi)
- Time zone: UTC+2 (EET)
  - Summer (DST): UTC+3 (EEST)
- Postal code: 152 39
- Area code: 210
- Vehicle registration: Z

Nea Penteli (Greek: Νέα Πεντέλη) is a small municipal unit - village in the northeastern part of the Athens agglomeration, Greece. Since the 2011 local government reform it is part of the municipality Penteli, of which it is a municipal unit.

== Geography ==
Nea Penteli is situated at the southwestern foot of the Penteli mountains, at 410 m (1,345.1 ft) elevation. The municipal unit has an area of 3.230 km^{2}. It is 14 km (9 mi) northeast of Athens city centre. At the centre of the village is a small hill named Profitis Ilias, after the small church constructed on top of it. Nea Penteli has one primary school and a high school.

== Historical population ==
Year	Population
1981	2,723
1991	4,332
2001	6,156
2011	7,198
2021	6,916

== See also ==
- List of municipalities of Attica
