= Kapandriti =

Town in Attica, Greece

Kapandriti Καπανδρίτι
- Municipal unit
- Location within the regional unit

- Location within Greece
- Coordinates: 38°13′N 23°53′E
- Country: Greece
- Administrative region: Attica
- Regional unit: East Attica
- Municipality: Oropos

Area
  - Municipal unit: 36.789 km^{2} (14.204 sq mi)
- Elevation: 356 m (1,168 ft)

Population (2021)
  - Municipal unit: 3,534
  - Municipal unit density: 96.06/km^{2} (248.8/sq mi)
- Time zone: UTC+2 (EET)
  - Summer (DST): UTC+3 (EEST)
- Postal code: 190 14
- Area code: 22950
- Vehicle registration: Z

Kapandriti (Greek: Καπανδρίτι) is a town in the north of East Attica in Greece. Since the 2011 local government reform it is part of the municipality Oropos, of which it is a municipal unit. The municipal unit has an area of 36.789 square kilometres (14.204 sq mi).

== Historical population ==
Kapandriti has historically been an Arvanite settlement. Following the population exchange between Greece and Turkey in the town also settled Pontic Greeks.

== See also ==
- List of municipalities of Attica
