= Agios Konstantinos, East Attica =

Village in Greece

Agios Konstantinos Άγιος Κωνσταντίνος
- Municipal unit
- Location within the regional unit

- Location within Greece
- Coordinates: 37°43′N 24°1′E
- Country: Greece
- Administrative region: Attica
- Regional unit: East Attica
- Municipality: Lavreotiki

Area
  - Municipal unit: 10.450 km^{2} (4.035 sq mi)
- Elevation: 154 m (505 ft)

Population (2021)
  - Municipal unit: 670
  - Municipal unit density: 64/km^{2} (170/sq mi)
- Time zone: UTC+2 (EET)
  - Summer (DST): UTC+3 (EEST)
- Postal code: 195 00
- Vehicle registration: Z

Agios Konstantinos (Greek: Άγιος Κωνσταντίνος meaning Saint Constantine, before 1954: Καμάριζα - Kamariza) is a village and a former community in East Attica, Greece. Since the 2011 local government reform it has been part of the municipality Lavreotiki, which is a municipal unit. It was named after Saint Constantine.

== Geography ==
Agios Konstantinos is situated in the hills in the southeastern part of the Attica peninsula, at about 160 m elevation. It is 4 km west of the Aegean Sea coast at Lavrio and 38 km southeast of Athens city centre. The municipal unit has an area of 10.450 km^{2}. There are several mines in the vicinity of Agios Konstantinos and neighboring Lavrio. In antiquity it was known for silver mines, currently minerals including azurite, chalcoalumite, calcite, austinite and adamite are found.

The community Agios Konstantinos also includes the village Esperídes (pop. 69).

== Historical population ==
Year	Village population	Community population
1981	428	-
1991	516	577
2001	620	687
2011	659	728
2021	600	670

== See also ==
- List of municipalities of Attica
