= Rodopoli =

Rodopoli Ροδόπολη
- Municipal unit
- Location within the regional unit

- Location within Greece
- Coordinates: 38°6′N 23°52′E
- Country: Greece
- Administrative region: Attica
- Regional unit: East Attica
- Municipality: Dionysos

Area
  - Municipal unit: 9.550 km^{2} (3.687 sq mi)
- Elevation: 395 m (1,296 ft)

Population (2021)
  - Municipal unit: 2,110
  - Municipal unit density: 221/km^{2} (572/sq mi)
- Time zone: UTC+2 (EET)
  - Summer (DST): UTC+3 (EEST)
- Postal code: 145 74
- Area code: 210

Rodopoli (Greek: Ροδόπολη, meaning "City of Roses", before 1981: Μπάλα - Bála) is a town in the East Attica regional unit, and a northern suburb of the Athens agglomeration, Greece. Since the 2011 local government reform it is part of the municipality Dionysos, of which it is a municipal unit. The municipal unit has an area of 9.550 km^{2}.

== Geography ==
Rodopoli is situated in the hills in the northeastern part of the Athens conurbation, at about 400 m elevation. It lies at the northwestern foot of the Penteliko Mountain. It is 1 km south of Stamata, 2 km north of Dionysos and 19 km northeast of Athens city centre. Its built-up area is continuous with those of the neighbouring towns Drosia and Dionysos. Part of Rodopoli has retained its old village character, while its eastern (and higher elevation) part has seen the development of higher quality residential properties.

== Historical population ==
Year	Population
1981	786
1991	1,359
2001	2,090
2011	2,078
2021	2,110

== See also ==
- List of municipalities of Attica
