= Anoixi =

Anoixi Άνοιξη
- Municipal unit
- Location within the regional unit

- Location within Greece
- Coordinates: 38°8′N 23°52′E
- Country: Greece
- Administrative region: Attica
- Regional unit: East Attica
- Municipality: Dionysos

Area
  - Municipal unit: 4.582 km^{2} (1.769 sq mi)
- Elevation: 370 m (1,210 ft)

Population (2021)
  - Municipal unit: 6,592
  - Municipal unit density: 1,439/km^{2} (3,726/sq mi)
- Time zone: UTC+2 (EET)
  - Summer (DST): UTC+3 (EEST)
- Postal code: 145 xx
- Area code: 210
- Vehicle registration: Z

Anoixi (Greek: Άνοιξη, meaning "spring") is a suburb of Athens in East Attica, Greece. Since the 2011 local government reform it is part of the municipality Dionysos, of which it is a municipal unit. The municipal unit has an area of 4.582 km^{2}.

== Geography ==
Anoixi is situated in the hills in the northeastern part of the Athens conurbation, at about 370 m elevation. It lies east of the Parnitha mountains and northwest of the Penteliko Mountain. It is 1 km south of Agios Stefanos, 9 km west of Marathon and 20 km northeast of Athens city centre. Its built-up area is continuous with those of the neighbouring suburbs Agios Stefanos, Drosia and Stamata.

The A1 motorway (Athens - Lamia - Thessaloniki) and the railway from Athens to Thessaloniki pass west of the town. Greek National Road 83 (Athens - Marathon - Rafina) passes through Anoixi.

== Historical population ==
Year	Population
1981	1,377
1991	2,864
2001	5,397
2011	6,510
2021	6,592

== See also ==
- List of municipalities of Attica
