= Magoula, Attica =

Magoula Μαγούλα
- Municipal unit
- Location within the regional unit

- Location within Greece
- Coordinates: 38°5′N 23°31′E
- Country: Greece
- Administrative region: Attica
- Regional unit: West Attica
- Municipality: Elefsina

Area
  - Municipal unit: 18.134 km^{2} (7.002 sq mi)
- Elevation: 61 m (200 ft)

Population (2021)
  - Municipal unit: 5,176
  - Municipal unit density: 285.4/km^{2} (739.3/sq mi)
- Time zone: UTC+2 (EET)
  - Summer (DST): UTC+3 (EEST)
- Postal code: 190 18
- Area code: 210
- Vehicle registration: Z

Magoula (Greek: Μαγούλα) is a suburban town of Athens and former community (pop. 4,992 in 2011) of West Attica, located in the Thriasio Plain. Since the 2011 local government reform, it is part of the municipality Elefsina, of which it is a municipal unit. The municipal unit has an area of 18.134 km^{2}.

Magoula is located 2 km east of Mandra, 5 km north of Elefsina and 21 km northwest of central Athens. The municipal unit of Magoúla also includes the village of Néos Póntos. Magoula is served by a station on the Athens Airport–Patras railway. The A6 motorway runs southeast of the town.

== Climate ==
According to the National Observatory of Athens station located in north Magoula the area has a Mediterranean climate (Köppen climate classification: Csa) with mild winters and hot summers. Due to its inland location it records among the coolest winter mean min. temperatures (4.7°C in January) and the highest summer mean maximum temperatures (36.5°C in July) in Metropolitan Athens. The Thriasio Plain is particularly vulnerable to high temperatures due to its topography. In July 2025 North Magoula recorded a mean maximum temperature of 38.6°C which is the highest ever recorded in Athens.

Climate data for North Magoula, Metropolitan Athens 157 m a.s.l.
Month	Jan	Feb	Mar	Apr	May	Jun	Jul	Aug	Sep	Oct	Nov	Dec	Year
Record high °C (°F)	23.3 (73.9)	23.9 (75.0)	28.2 (82.8)	31.6 (88.9)	40.5 (104.9)	42.9 (109.2)	43.8 (110.8)	45.9 (114.6)	39.8 (103.6)	34.0 (93.2)	28.6 (83.5)	23.8 (74.8)	45.9 (114.6)
Mean daily maximum °C (°F)	14.2 (57.6)	15.4 (59.7)	18.6 (65.5)	22.6 (72.7)	28.1 (82.6)	33.9 (93.0)	36.5 (97.7)	35.9 (96.6)	31.1 (88.0)	25.4 (77.7)	20.0 (68.0)	15.9 (60.6)	24.8 (76.6)
Daily mean °C (°F)	9.5 (49.1)	10.2 (50.4)	12.7 (54.9)	16.3 (61.3)	21.3 (70.3)	27.0 (80.6)	29.8 (85.6)	29.3 (84.7)	25.0 (77.0)	20.1 (68.2)	15.4 (59.7)	11.4 (52.5)	19.0 (66.2)
Mean daily minimum °C (°F)	4.7 (40.5)	5.1 (41.2)	6.8 (44.2)	9.9 (49.8)	14.5 (58.1)	20.1 (68.2)	23.0 (73.4)	22.7 (72.9)	18.8 (65.8)	14.8 (58.6)	10.9 (51.6)	7.0 (44.6)	13.2 (55.7)
Record low °C (°F)	−4.1 (24.6)	−1.9 (28.6)	−2.6 (27.3)	1.4 (34.5)	8.6 (47.5)	11.8 (53.2)	16.6 (61.9)	17.8 (64.0)	9.5 (49.1)	5.3 (41.5)	1.9 (35.4)	−1.8 (28.8)	−4.1 (24.6)
Source: National Observatory of Athens (Jul 2018- Jul 2025)

== Historical population ==
Year	Town population	Municipal unit population
1981	1,915	-
1991	2,663	-
2001	3,728	4,005
2011	4,735	4,992
2021	4,956	5,176

== Gallery ==
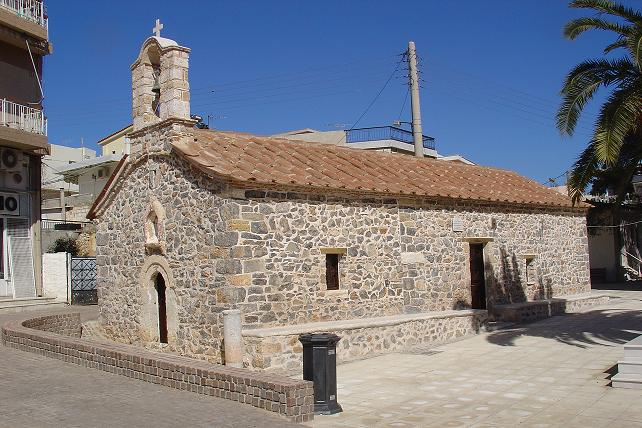
Agios Dimitrios orthodox church in Magoula

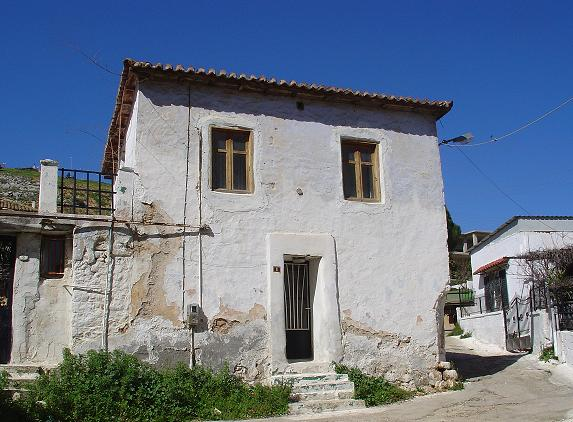
Traditional house in Magoula
