= Polydendri =

Polydendri Πολυδένδρι
- Municipal unit
- Location within the regional unit

- Location within Greece
- Coordinates: 38°12′N 23°52′E
- Country: Greece
- Administrative region: Attica
- Regional unit: East Attica
- Municipality: Oropos

Area
  - Municipal unit: 13.881 km^{2} (5.359 sq mi)
- Elevation: 333 m (1,093 ft)

Population (2021)
  - Municipal unit: 1,221
  - Municipal unit density: 87.96/km^{2} (227.8/sq mi)
- Time zone: UTC+2 (EET)
  - Summer (DST): UTC+3 (EEST)
- Postal code: 19014
- Area code: +30-22950

Polydendri (Greek: Πολυδένδρι, English: "Many trees") is a town and former community of East Attica, Greece. Since the 2011 local government reform it is part of the municipality Oropos, of which it is a municipal unit. It is part of Athens metropolitan area. Polydendri has historically been an Arvanite settlement.

== Geography ==
It is located in the north of Athens. Polydendri is at an altitude of 340 meters. The town contains 1,221 residents (2021 census) and it has many cultural unions, such as a youth union, a traditional dance union, an athletic club (the "Black Eagle of Polydendri" playing at the athletic center of Gourezi), a tracking club and a heavy metal society (called "the Obscure" and numbering 1.500 members from all around Greece). Furthermore, Polydendri is known for its taverns.

The municipal unit has a land area of 13.881 km^{2} and also includes the villages of Taxiárches, Irakleideís, and Ágios Geórgios.
