= Anthousa, Attica =

Anthousa Ανθούσα
- Municipal unit
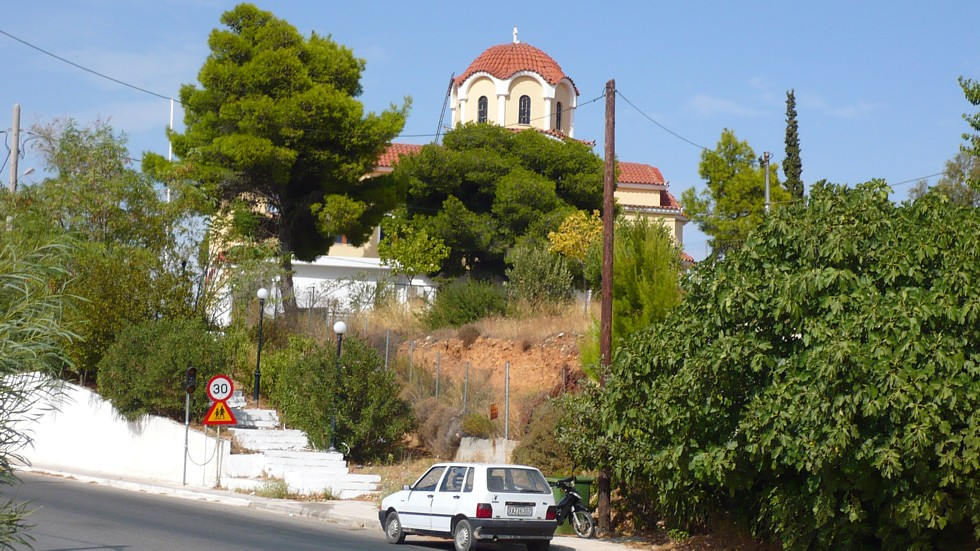

- Location within the regional unit

- Location within Greece
- Coordinates: 38°2′N 23°52′E
- Country: Greece
- Administrative region: Attica
- Regional unit: East Attica
- Municipality: Pallini

Area
  - Municipal unit: 3.865 km^{2} (1.492 sq mi)
- Elevation: 338 m (1,109 ft)

Population (2021)
  - Municipal unit: 2,158
  - Municipal unit density: 558.3/km^{2} (1,446/sq mi)
- Time zone: UTC+2 (EET)
  - Summer (DST): UTC+3 (EEST)
- Postal code: 153 xx
- Area code: 210
- Vehicle registration: Z
- Website: -

Anthousa (Greek: Ανθούσα meaning "in blossom") is a suburban town in Athens East Attica regional unit, Greece. Since the 2011 local government reform it is part of the municipality Pallini, of which it is a municipal unit. The municipal unit has an area of 3.865 km^{2}.

== Geography ==
Anthousa is situated in the eastern part of the Athens conurbation, at about 300 m elevation. It lies in the southern foothills of the Penteliko Mountain. It is 3 km north of Pallini, 2 km south of Penteli and 14 km northeast of Athens city centre. The A6 motorway passes southwest of Anthousa.

== Historical population ==
Year	Village population	Community population
1981	577	-
1991	2,787	3,020
2001	-	3,024
2011	-	2,132
2021	-	2,158

== See also ==
- List of municipalities of Attica
