= Kryoneri, Attica =

Kryoneri Κρυονέρι
- Municipal unit
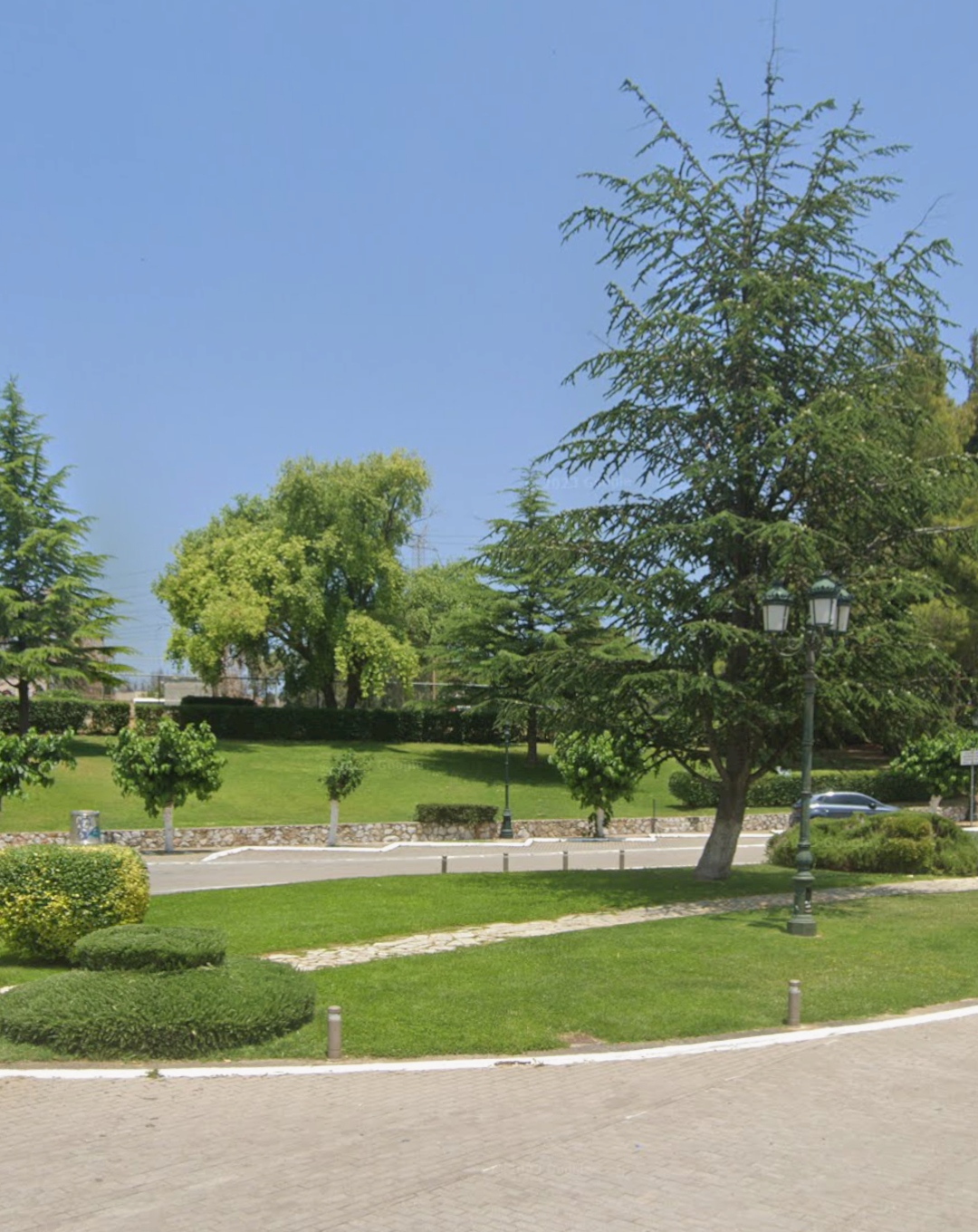
- Kryoneri Square, April 2024

- Location within the regional unit

- Location within Greece
- Coordinates: 38°8′N 23°50′E
- Country: Greece
- Administrative region: Attica
- Regional unit: East Attica
- Municipality: Dionysos

Area
  - Municipal unit: 4.531 km^{2} (1.749 sq mi)
- Elevation: 380 m (1,250 ft)

Population (2021)
  - Municipal unit: 5,318
  - Municipal unit density: 1,174/km^{2} (3,040/sq mi)
- Time zone: UTC+2 (EET)
  - Summer (DST): UTC+3 (EEST)
- Postal code: 145 68
- Area code: 210
- Vehicle registration: ZB-ZY
- Website: www.kryoneri.gr

Kryoneri (Greek: Κρυονέρι [kɾioˈneɾi], meaning "cold water") is a suburban town of Athens in East Attica, Greece. Since the 2011 local government reform it is part of the municipality Dionysos, of which it is a municipal unit. The municipal unit has an area of 4.531 km^{2}.

== Geography ==
Kryoneri is situated in the hills in the northeastern part of the Athens conurbation, at about 380 m elevation. It lies in the eastern foothills of the Parnitha mountains. It is 2 km west of Agios Stefanos and 20 km northeast of Athens city centre. The A1 motorway (Athens–Thessaloniki–Evzonoi) and the railway from Athens to Thessaloniki pass east of the town.

== Historical population ==
Kryoneri has historically been an Arvanite settlement.

Year	Population
1981	858
1991	1,261
2001	2,721
2011	5,040
2021	5,318

== Football team ==
Kryoneri has a football team called AO Kryoneriou and plays in the public stadium of kryoneri, Ao Kryoneriou was founded in 1984 by the people of Kryoneri and still exist even after some economic problems.
