= Dionysos, Greece =

Dionysos Διόνυσος
- Municipality
- Dionysos Skyline

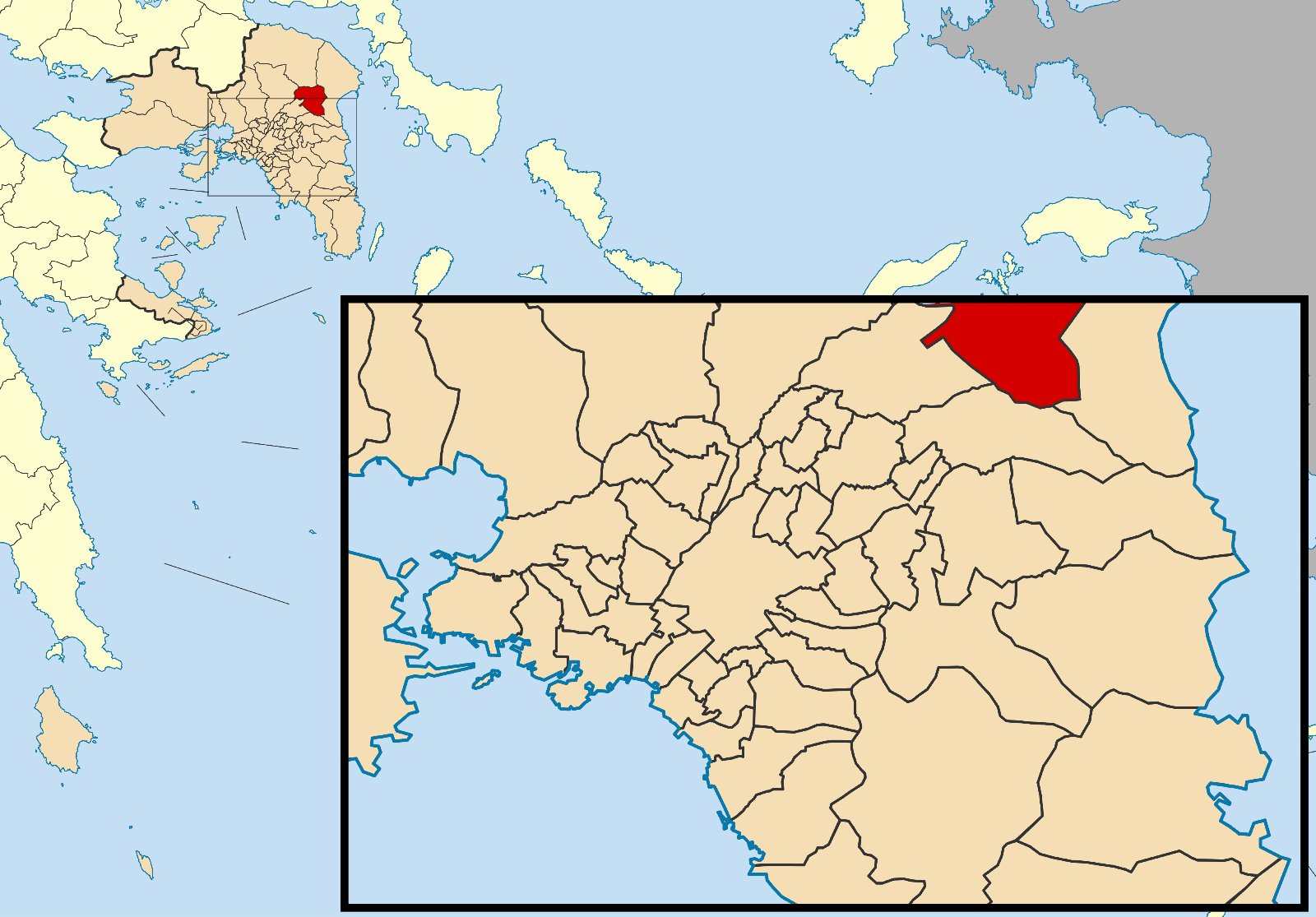

- Location within Greece
- Coordinates: 38°6′N 23°52′E
- Country: Greece
- Administrative region: Attica
- Regional unit: East Attica

Government
  - Mayor: Katerina Maichosoglou (since 2023)

Area
  - Municipality: 69.36 km^{2} (26.78 sq mi)
  - Municipal unit: 21.41 km^{2} (8.27 sq mi)
- Elevation: 480 m (1,570 ft)

Population (2021)
  - Municipality: 42,376
  - Density: 611.0/km^{2} (1,582/sq mi)
  - Municipal unit: 7,021
  - Municipal unit density: 327.9/km^{2} (849.3/sq mi)
- Time zone: UTC+2 (EET)
  - Summer (DST): UTC+3 (EEST)
- Postal code: 145 76
- Area code: 210
- Vehicle registration: Z
- Website: www.dimosdionysou.gr

Dionysos (Greek: Διόνυσος) is a northern suburb of the Athens agglomeration and a municipality in northeastern Attica, Greece. The seat of the municipality is the town Agios Stefanos.

== Geography ==
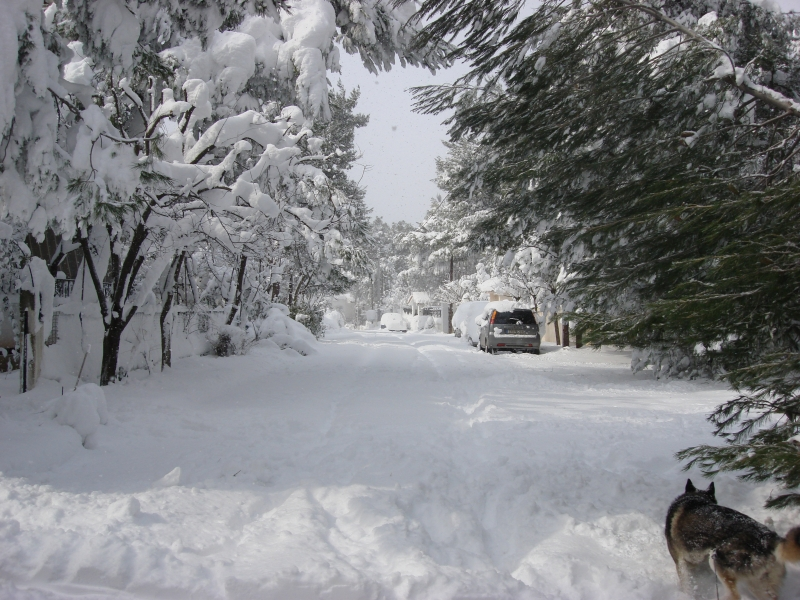
Dionysos in snow.

Dionysos is situated on the northeastern slopes of the forested Penteliko Mountains. It is 5 km south of Agios Stefanos, 9 km west of Nea Makri, on the Aegean Sea coast, and 18 km northeast of Athens city centre. Its built-up area is continuous with those of the neighbouring suburbs Drosia and Rodopoli to the northwest. Even though the town is located only 20 Kilometres away from central Athens, it has a completely different climate, with weather being significantly cooler, including frequent snowfall during the winter. The A1 motorway (Athens–Thessaloniki–Evzonoi) and the railway from Athens to Thessaloniki pass through the western part of the municipality, near Agios Stefanos. There is a railway station at Agios Stefanos. Dionysos is connected to Kifisia by the 536 Dionysos-Kifisia bus service.

=== Climate ===
Dionysos has a hot-summer Mediterranean climate (Köppen climate classification: Csa). Thrakomakedones experiences hot, relatively dry summers and cool, wet winters.

Climate data for Dionysos
Month	Jan	Feb	Mar	Apr	May	Jun	Jul	Aug	Sep	Oct	Nov	Dec	Year
Mean daily maximum °C (°F)	9.07 (48.33)	10.51 (50.92)	13.03 (55.45)	18.49 (65.28)	24.45 (76.01)	30.11 (86.20)	31.59 (88.86)	31.37 (88.47)	27.83 (82.09)	21.40 (70.52)	15.06 (59.11)	10.86 (51.55)	20.31 (68.56)
Daily mean °C (°F)	5.43 (41.77)	6.09 (42.96)	8.17 (46.71)	12.71 (54.88)	18.67 (65.61)	24.39 (75.90)	25.40 (77.72)	25.65 (78.17)	20.29 (68.52)	15.30 (59.54)	10.72 (51.30)	7.52 (45.54)	14.83 (58.69)
Mean daily minimum °C (°F)	1.39 (34.50)	1.59 (34.86)	2.84 (37.11)	5.71 (42.28)	9.93 (49.87)	15.14 (59.25)	17.55 (63.59)	16.69 (62.04)	13.48 (56.26)	8.97 (48.15)	6.66 (43.99)	3.76 (38.77)	8.52 (47.34)
Average precipitation mm (inches)	70.15 (2.76)	66.15 (2.60)	76.68 (3.02)	46.33 (1.82)	26.03 (1.02)	11.80 (0.46)	13.27 (0.52)	12.36 (0.49)	16.31 (0.64)	68.31 (2.69)	94.65 (3.73)	91.75 (3.61)	593.79 (23.38)
Mean monthly sunshine hours	120.18	129.62	159.63	194.57	255.66	313.67	319.81	305.17	253.86	188.14	117.41	100.97	2,516.6
Source: Hellenic National Meteorological Service

== History ==
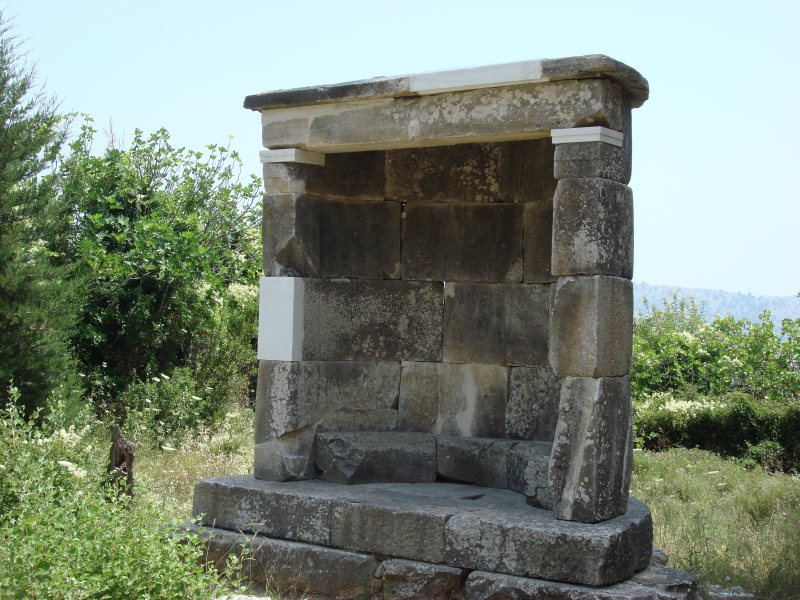
The Dionysos Monument today.

The town was known by the Arvanitika name Tzamali (Τζαμάλη) up until 1928 when it was renamed Dionysos. The sanctuary of Dionysus of Icaria was rediscovered by archaeology in 1888.

== Culture ==
Dionysos hosts an annual open summer festival usually every July, featuring art exhibitions, theatrical performances, musical shows, sculpture painting and other arts. The public library of Dionysos is located in the town hall, includes over 3500 books available to registered residents to borrow for free. It is run by local volunteers.

== Municipality ==
The municipality Dionysos was formed at the 2011 local government reform by the merger of the following 7 former municipalities, that became municipal units:

- Agios Stefanos
- Anoixi
- Dionysos
- Drosia
- Kryoneri
- Rodopoli
- Stamata

The municipality has an area of 69.360 km^{2}, the municipal unit 21.410 km^{2}.

== Notable people ==
- Thespis, (6th century BC) actor
- Kostas Martakis, singer
- Aristi Tsipras, mother of the former Greek prime minister Alexis Tsipras

== Gallery ==
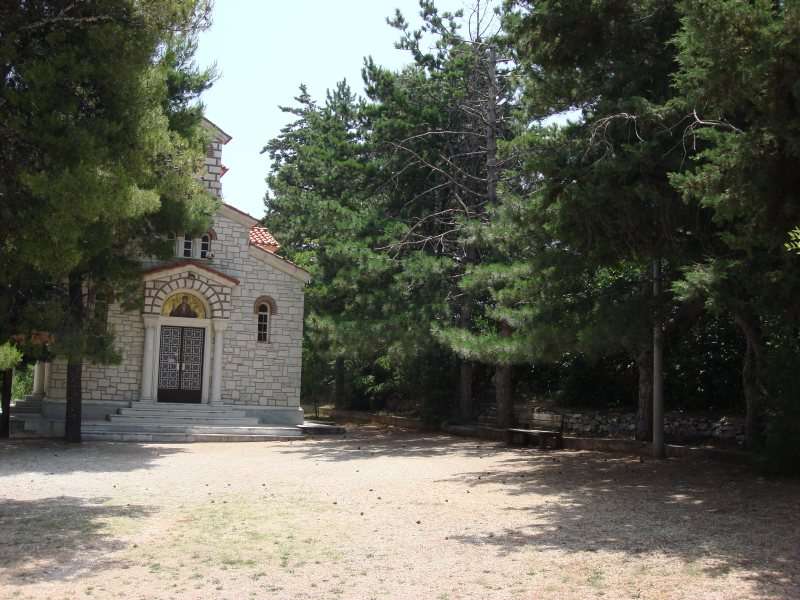
The St. George Chiopolitis church in Dionysos

Penteli mountain as viewed from Dionysos

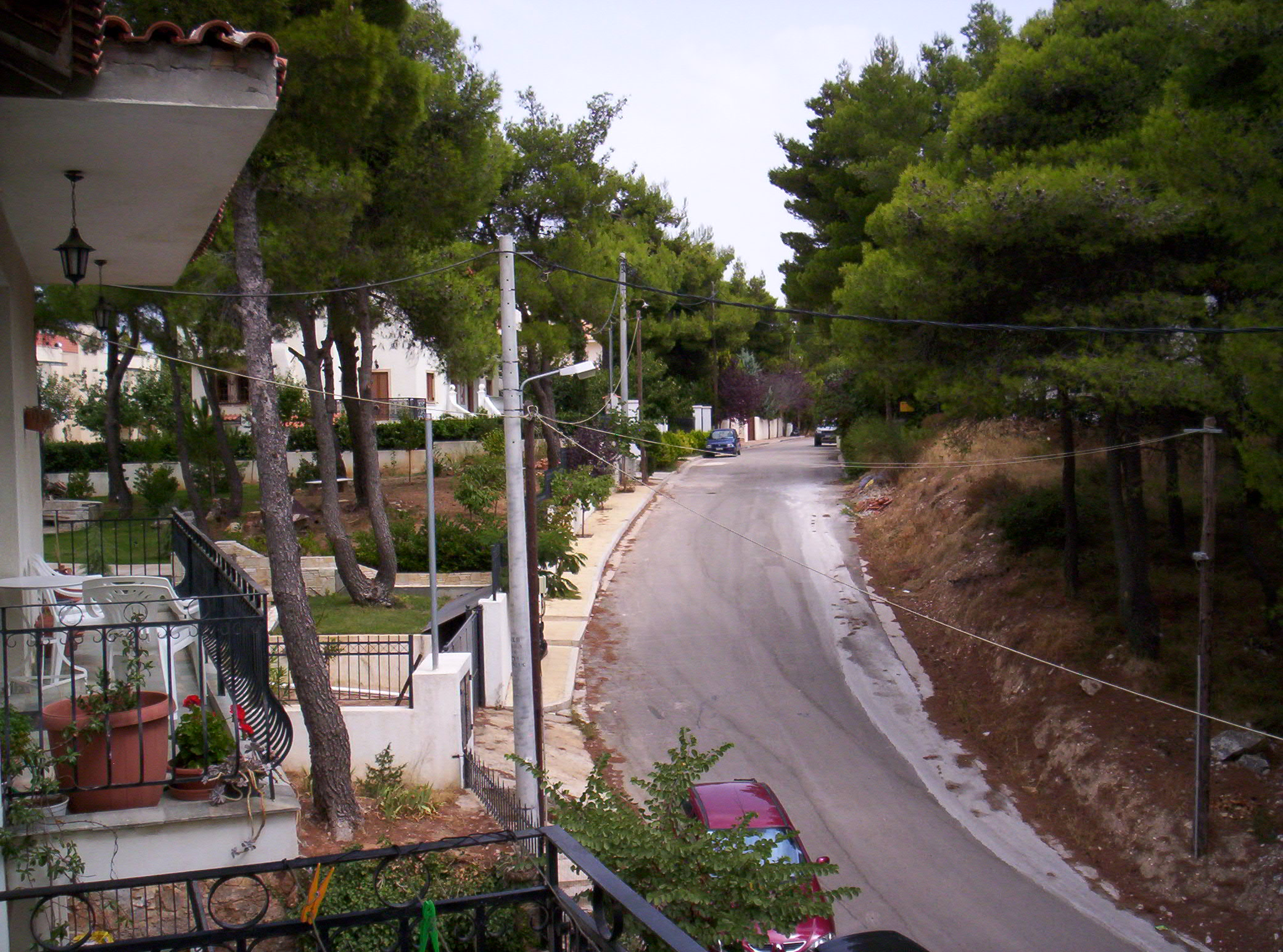
Typical street in Dionysos

== See also ==
- List of municipalities of Attica
