= Agios Stefanos, Attica =

Town in the Athens urban area, Greece

Agios Stefanos Άγιος Στέφανος
- Municipal unit
- Location within the regional unit

- Location within Greece
- Coordinates: 38°8′N 23°51′E
- Country: Greece
- Administrative region: Attica
- Regional unit: East Attica
- Municipality: Dionysos

Area
  - Municipal unit: 8.136 km^{2} (3.141 sq mi)
- Elevation: 350 m (1,150 ft)

Population (2021)
  - Municipal unit: 10,597
  - Municipal unit density: 1,302/km^{2} (3,373/sq mi)
- Time zone: UTC+2 (EET)
  - Summer (DST): UTC+3 (EEST)
- Postal code: 145 xx
- Area code: 210
- Vehicle registration: Z
- Website: www.agstefanos.gr

Agios Stefanos (Greek: Άγιος Στέφανος, romanized: Ágios Stéfanos, meaning Saint Stephen) is a town and a northern suburb of the Athens agglomeration, Greece. Since the 2011 local government reform it is part of the municipality of Dionysos, of which it is the seat and a municipal unit. The municipal unit has an area of 8.136 km^{2}.

== Geography ==
Agios Stefanos is situated in the hills in the northeastern part of the Athens conurbation, at about 350 m elevation. It lies east of the Parnitha mountains, northwest of the Penteliko Mountain, and 4 km southwest of the Marathon Reservoir. The source of the river Kifisos is near Agios Stefanos. It is 9 km west of Marathon and 21 km northeast of Athens city centre. Its built-up area is continuous with those of the neighbouring suburbs Anoixi and Stamata to the south.

The A1 motorway (Athens–Thessaloniki–Evzonoi) passes west of the town. Agios Stefanos has a railway station on the railway from Athens to Thessaloniki. Athens ERA-1 transmitter, the second tallest man-made structure of Greece, is situated north of Agios Stefanos.

== Historical population ==
Agios Stefanos has historically been an Arvanite settlement.

Year	Town population	Municipality population
1981	2,388	-
1991	5,243	5,333
2001	8,790	8,961
2011	9,892	10,015
2021	10,492	10,597

== See also ==
- List of municipalities of Attica
