= Kropia =

Municipality in Attica, Greece

Kropia Κρωπία
- Municipality
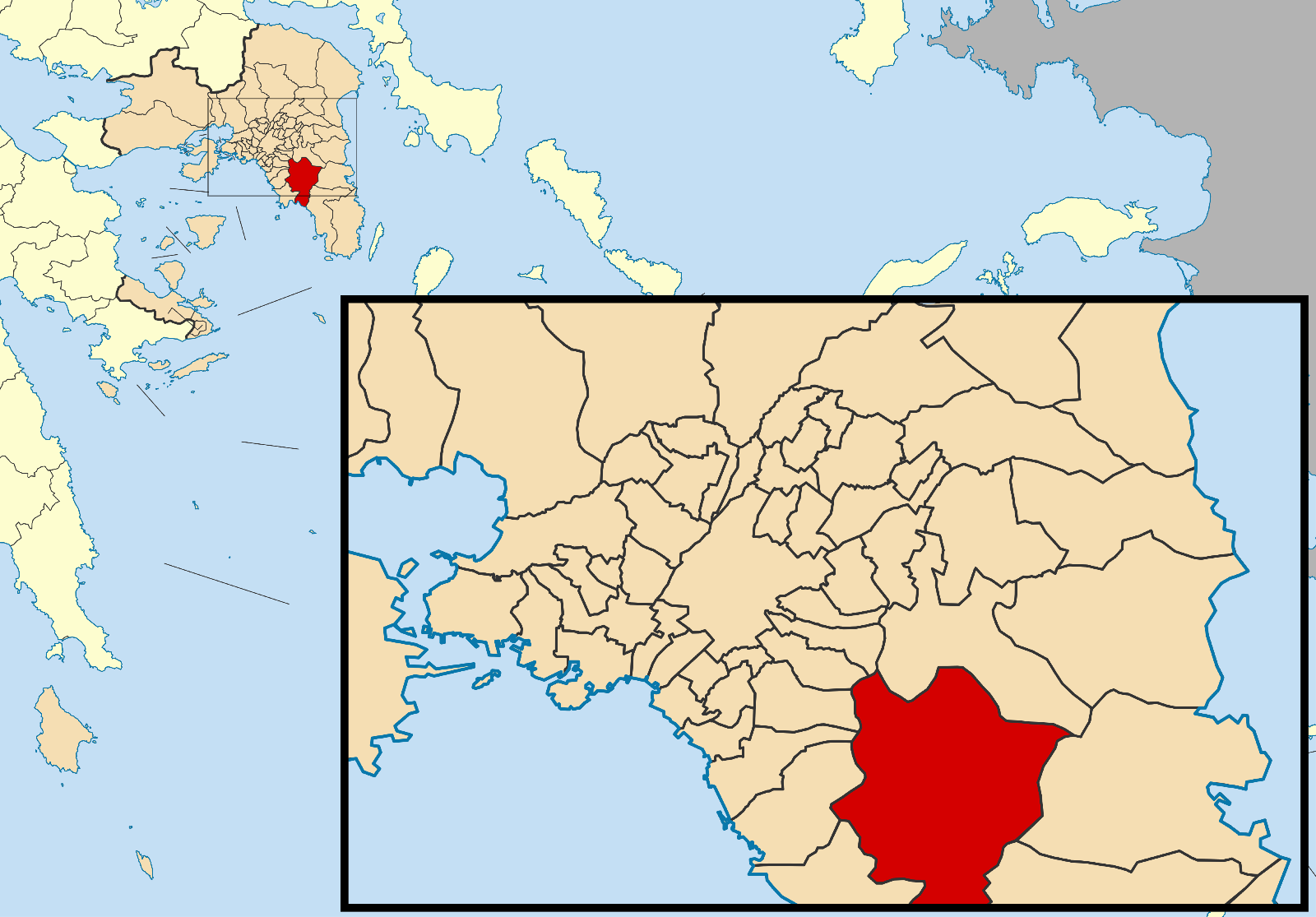

- Location within Greece
- Coordinates: 37°54′N 23°52′E
- Country: Greece
- Administrative region: Attica
- Regional unit: East Attica

Government
  - Mayor: Dimitrios Kiousis (since 2011)

Area
  - Municipality: 102.0 km^{2} (39.4 sq mi)
- Elevation: 106 m (348 ft)

Population (2021)
  - Municipality: 30,817
  - Density: 302.1/km^{2} (782.5/sq mi)
- Time zone: UTC+2 (EET)
  - Summer (DST): UTC+3 (EEST)
- Postal code: 194 00
- Area code: 210
- Vehicle registration: Z
- Website: www.koropi.gr

Kropia (Greek: Κρωπία) is a municipality in East Attica, Greece and has a land area of 102.0 km^{2}. The soil is very fertile (something common in the Mediterranean) and many crops are grown on it, most importantly vineyards, olives, figs, pistachios, honey and vegetables. Its population was 30,817 at the 2021 census. The seat of the municipality is in the town of Koropi (pop. 19,164 in 2011). In descending order of population, its other villages are Kítsi (pop. 4,788), Agía Marína (3,765), Karellás (1,579), and Ágios Dimítrios (1,011).

Olympic Air has its head office in Kropia.
