= Stamata =

Stamata Σταμάτα
- Municipal unit
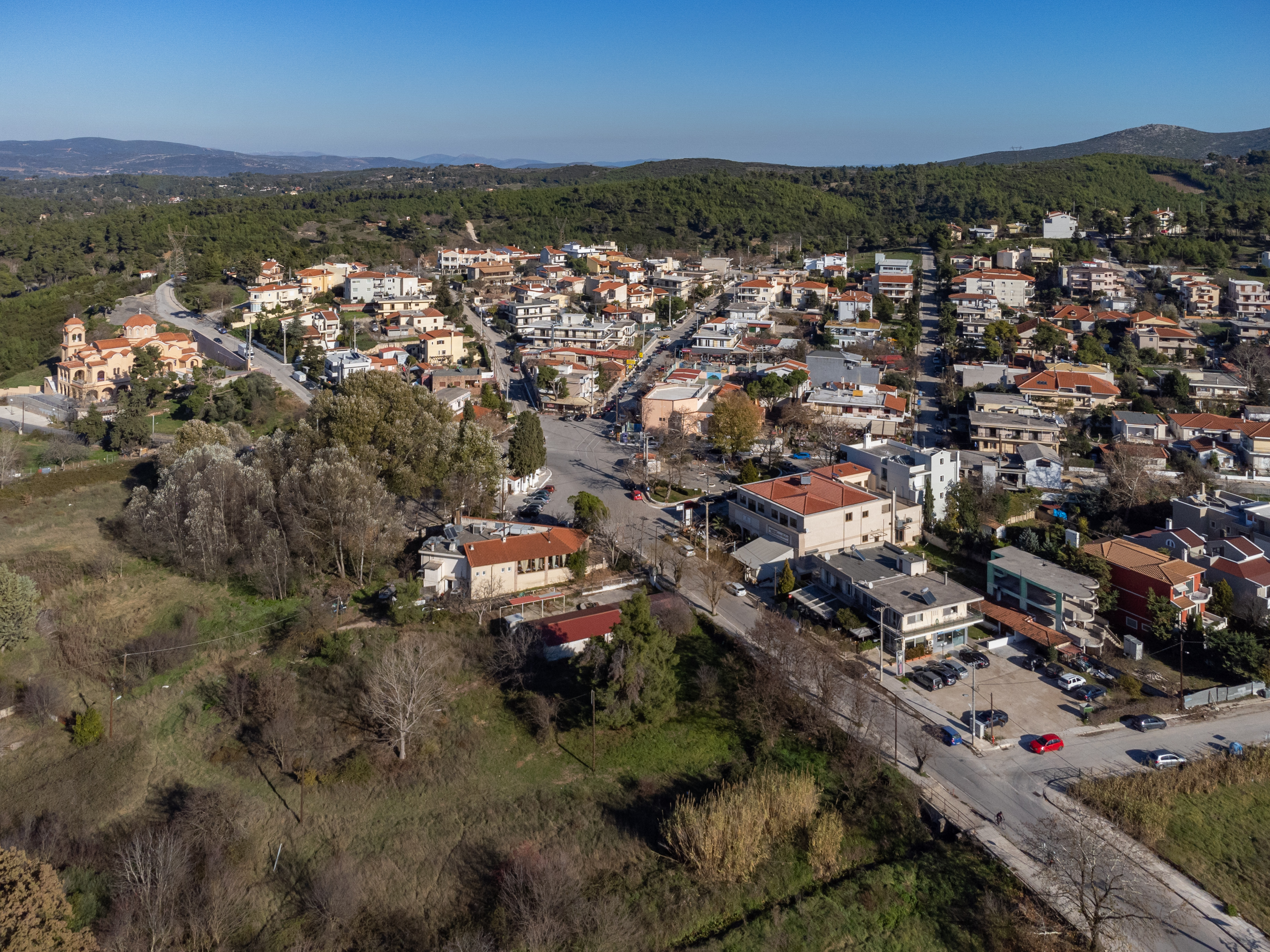
- Aerial view of Stamata in 2022

- Location within the regional unit

- Location within Greece
- Coordinates: 38°07′N 23°52′E
- Country: Greece
- Administrative region: Attica
- Regional unit: East Attica
- Municipality: Dionysos

Area
  - Municipal unit: 18.950 km^{2} (7.317 sq mi)
- Elevation: 370 m (1,210 ft)

Population (2021)
  - Municipal unit: 2,901
  - Municipal unit density: 153.1/km^{2} (396.5/sq mi)
- Time zone: UTC+2 (EET)
  - Summer (DST): UTC+3 (EEST)
- Postal code: 145 75
- Area code: 210
- Vehicle registration: Z

Stamata (Greek: Σταμάτα) is a community in Athens, East Attica regional unit, Greece. Since the 2011 local government reform, it is part of the municipality Dionysos, of which it is a municipal unit. The municipal unit has an area of 18.950 km^{2}.

Stamata is a rather exclusive suburb, situated in the mountainous northeastern part of the Athenian plain, between the Parnitha and Penteli mountains, about 23 km northeast of center of Athens. Till the last decades, only the main village was inhabited, while the rural area was cultivated by the inhabitants of the village. Nowadays, there are also residences in the settlement of Amygdaleza (Αμυγδαλέζα) and the residential associations of Euxeinos Pontos (Εύξεινος Πόντος) and Prokonisos (Προκόνησος). Stamata could be designated as a rural, rather than a suburban, area, but luxury houses and villas are continuously being developed, mainly in the aforementioned residential associations, turning Stamata into an upper middle class suburb.

== Land use ==
A beautiful pine forest covers the largest part of Stamata, where any kind of development is strictly prohibited by law, although it is an open secret that there are various cases of trespassing and environmental devastation. The residential areas cover only a small part, while in the remaining rural areas, there are sheepcotes, farmlands and vineyards.

== Legend ==
Stamata is believed to lie along the route run by Pheidippides on his mythical journey to declare victory in the Battle of Marathon, which gave its name to the marathon sporting event. According to the legend, Pheidippides was urged to stop (Greek: Σταμάτα) while passing through the community, hence giving it its name.

== Cuisine ==
Stamata is now famed for its tavernas serving grilled meat, popular among weekending Athenians, and the viticulture.

== See also ==
- List of municipalities of Attica
