= Athens B1 =

Parliamentary constituency of Greece

- Electoral constituency for the Hellenic Parliament
- Athens B1 – North Athens within Greece and Attica
- Regional units: North Athens and part of Central Athens
- Administrative region: Attica
- Population: 687,391 (2011)
- Major settlements: Athens

Current constituency
- Created: 2018
- Number of members: 15

The B1 North Athens electoral constituency (Greek: Β1' Εκλογική Περιφέρεια Βόρειου Τομέα Αθηνών) is a parliamentary constituency of Greece, created after the breakup of Athens B in 2018.

== Boundaries ==
The constituency includes most of the northern suburbs of the Athens urban area:

Municipality	Districts
Agia Paraskevi	Agia Paraskevi
Chalandri	Chalandri
Filadelfeia-Chalkidona	Nea Filadelfeia, Nea Chalkidona
Filothei-Psychiko	Psychiko, Filothei, Neo Psychiko
Galatsi	Galatsi
Irakleio	Irakleio
Kifissia	Kifissia, Ekali, Nea Erythraia
Lykovrysi-Pefki	Pefki, Lykovrysi
Marousi	Marousi
Metamorfosi	Metamorfosi
Nea Ionia	Nea Ionia
Papagou-Cholargos	Cholargos, Papagou
Penteli	Melissia, Penteli, Nea Penteli
Vrilissia	Vrilissia

== Election results ==
=== Parliamentary ===
2000

2004

2007

2009

5/2012

6/2012

1/2015

9/2015

2019

5/2023

6/2023

=== European ===
2009

2014

2019

2024
