= Athens Prefecture =

Coordinates: 37°58′N 23°43′E

Athens Νομαρχία Αθηνών
- Former prefecture
- Location of Athens in Greece

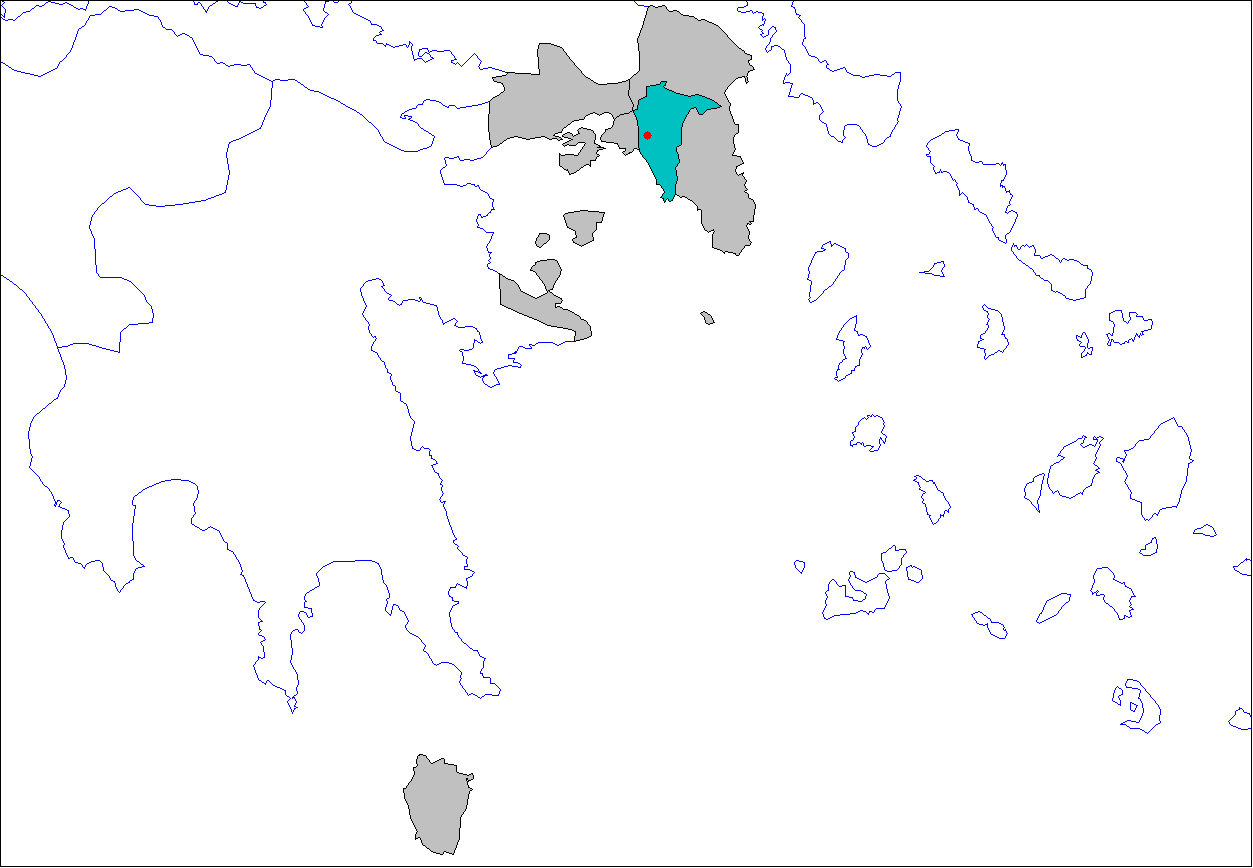
- Location of municipalities within Athens Prefecture
- Country: Greece
- Periphery: Attica
- Established: 1972
- Disestablished: 2010
- Capital: Athens

Area
  - Total: 361 km^{2} (139 sq mi)
  - Rank: 53rd

Population (2001)
  - Total: 2,664,776
  - Rank: 1st
  - Density: 7,380/km^{2} (19,100/sq mi)
  - Rank: 1st
- Postal codes: 1xx xx
- Area codes: 21x
- ISO 3166 code: GR-A1
- Vehicle registration: IH/IK
- Website: www.nomarxia.gr

The Athens Prefecture (Greek: Νομαρχία Αθηνών, romanized: Nomarkhía Athinón) was one of the prefectures of Greece. It was part of the Attica region and the Athens-Piraeus super-prefecture. The capital of the prefecture was the city of Athens. After Lefkada Prefecture it was the second-smallest in Greece, but was the most populous and most densely populated. It covered the central part of the agglomeration of Athens. Its extremities lied in the municipalities or communities of Chaidari in the west, Ekali in the north, Penteli in the east, and Glyfada in the south. It bordered East Attica Prefecture to the northeast, east, and southeast, West Attica Prefecture to the northwest, and Piraeus Prefecture and the Saronic Gulf to the west.

== Regional units ==
In 2011 the prefecture was abolished and the territory is now covered by:

- North Athens (regional unit)
- West Athens (regional unit)
- Central Athens (regional unit)
- South Athens (regional unit)

== Municipalities and communities ==
Municipality	Seat	Population	Area (km^{2})	Density (/km^{2})	YPES Code
Agia Varvara (Αγία Βαρβάρα)	Agia Varvara (Αγία Βαρβάρα)	30,562	2.425	12,603	0101
Agia Paraskevi (Αγία Παρασκευή)	Agia Paraskevi (Αγία Παρασκευή)	59,500	7.967	7,498	0102
Agioi Anargyroi (Άγιοι Ανάργυροι)	Agioi Anargyroi (Άγιοι Ανάργυροι)	32,957	3.200	10,299	0104
Agios Dimitrios (Άγιος Δημήτριος)	Brahami (Μπραχάμι)	65,173	4.949	13,169	0103
Aigaleo (Αιγάλεω)	Aigaleo (Αιγάλεω)	74,046	6.450	11,480	0106
Alimos (Άλιμος)	Kalamaki (Καλαμάκι)	38,047	5.909	6,439	0107
Marousi (Μαρούσι)	Marousi (Μαρούσι)	69,470	13.093	5,369	0108
Argyroupoli (Αργυρούπολη)	Argyroupoli (Αργυρούπολη)	33,158	8.228	4,030	0109
Athens (Αθήνα)	Athens (Αθήνα)	745,514	38.964	19,133	0105
Chaidari (Χαϊδάρι)	Chaidari (Χαϊδάρι)	46,276	22.655	2,043	0145
Chalandri (Χαλάνδρι)	Chalandri (Χαλάνδρι)	71,684	9.629	6,634	0146
Cholargos (Χολαργός)	Cholargos (Χολαργός)	32,166	3.950	8,143	0147
Dafni (Δάφνη)	Dafni (Δάφνη)	23,674	1.375	17,155	0114
Ekali (Εκάλη)	Ekali (Εκάλη)	5,190	4.332	1,198	0115
Elliniko (Ελληνικό)	Elliniko (Ελληνικό)	16,740	7.127	2,349	0116
Filothei (Φιλοθέη)	Filothei (Φιλοθέη)	7,310	2.301	3,177	0144
Galatsi (Γαλάτσι)	Galatsi (Γαλάτσι)	58,042	4.026	14,417	0112
Glyfada (Γλυφάδα)	Glyfada (Γλυφάδα)	80,409	25.366	3,170	0113
Ilion (Ίλιον)	Nea Liosia (Νέα Λιόσια)	80,859	9.250	8,554	0120
Ilioupoli (Ηλιούπολη)	Ilioupoli (Ηλιούπολη)	75,904	12.724	5,965	0118
Irakleio (Ηράκλειο)	Neo Irakleio (Νέο Ηράκλειο)	45,926	4.652	9,902	0119
Kaisariani (Καισαριανή)	Kaisariani (Καισαριανή)	26,419	7.841	3,369	0121
Kallithea (Καλλιθέα)	Kallithea (Καλλιθέα)	109,609	4.749	23,080	0122
Kamatero (Καματερό)	Kamatero (Καματερό)	22,234	5.950	3,737	0123
Kifisia (Κηφισιά)	Kifisia (Κηφισιά)	43,929	25.937	1,694	0124
Lykovrysi (Λυκόβρυση)	Lykovrysi (Λυκόβρυση)	8,116	1.950	4,162	0125
Melissia (Μελίσσια)	Melissia (Μελίσσια)	19,526	3.906	4,936	0126
Metamorfosi (Μεταμόρφωση)	Koukouvaounes (Κουκουβάουνες)	26,448	5.502	4,807	0127
Moschato (Μοσχάτο)	Moschato (Μοσχάτο)	23,153	2.325	9,958	0128
Nea Chalkidona (Νέα Χαλκηδόνα)	Nea Chalkidona (Νέα Χαλκηδόνα)	10,112	0.800	12,640	0134
Nea Erythraia (Νέα Ερυθραία)	Nea Erythraia (Νέα Ερυθραία)	15,439	4.831	3,196	0129
Nea Ionia (Νέα Ιωνία)	Nea Ionia (Νέα Ιωνία)	66,017	4.407	14,933	0130
Nea Filadelfeia (Νέα Φιλαδέλφεια)	Nea Filadelfeia (Νέα Φιλαδέλφεια)	24,112	2.850	8,460	0133
Nea Smyrni (Νέα Σμύρνη)	Nea Smyrni (Νέα Σμύρνη)	73,986	3.524	20,995	0132
Nea Penteli (Νέα Πεντέλη)	Nea Penteli (Νέα Πεντέλη)	6,156	3.230	1,906	0131
Neo Psychiko (Νέο Ψυχικό)	Neo Psychiko (Νέο Ψυχικό)	10,848	1.000	10,848	0135
Palaio Faliro (Φάληρο)	Palaio Faliro (Παλαιό Φάληρο)	64,759	4.574	14,158	0136
Papagou (Παπάγου)	Papagou (Παπάγου)	13,207	3.375	3,913	0137
Pefki (Πεύκη)	Pefki (Πέυκη)	19,887	2.176	9,139	0141
Penteli (Πεντέλη)	Penteli (Πεντέλη)	4,829	29.498	167	0138
Peristeri (Περιστέρι)	Peristeri (Περιστέρι)	137,918	10.050	13,723	0139
Petroupoli (Πετρούπολη)	Petroupoli (Πετρούπολη)	48,327	6.800	7,326	0140
Psychiko (Ψυχικό)	Palaio Psychiko (Παλαιό Ψυχικό)	10,901	2.776	3,927	0148
Tavros (Ταύρος)	Tavros (Ταύρος)	14,963	2.125	7,041	0141
Vrilissia (Βριλήσσια)	Analipsi (Ανάληψη)	25,582	3.856	6,634	0110
Vyronas (Βύρωνας)	Vironas (Βύρωνας)	61,102	9.204	6,639	0111
Ymittos (Υμηττός)	Ymittos (Υμηττός)	11,139	0.975	11,425	0143
Zografou (Ζωγράφου)	Zografou (Ζωγράφου)	76,115	8.517	8,937	0117
Total Athens Prefecture	Athens (Αθήνα)	2,664,776	361.300	7,367	

Municipalities of Athens Prefecture

1. Athens	2. Kallithea	3. Moschato	4. Tavros	5. Egaleo	6. Agia Varvara	7. Chaidari	8. Peristeri	9. Petroupoli

10. Ilion; 11. Kamatero; 12. Agioi Anargyroi; 13. Nea Chalkidona; 14. Nea Filadelfeia; 15. Nea Ionia; 16. Irakleio; 17. Metamorfosi; 18. Lykovrysi; 19. Pefki; 20. Marousi; 21. Kifisia; 22. Melissia; 23. Nea Erythraia; 24. Ekali	Αθήνα	25. Nea Penteli; 26. Penteli; 27. Vrilissia; 28. Chalandri; 29. Agia Paraskevi; 30. Cholargos; 31. Papagou; 32. Neo Psychiko; 33. Psychiko; 34. Filothei; 35. Galatsi; 36. Zografou; 37. Kaisariani; 38. Vironas; 39. Ymittos

40. Dafni	41. Nea Smyrni	42. Palaio Faliro	43. Agios Dimitrios	44. Ilioupoli	45. Argyroupoli	46. Alimos	47. Elliniko	48. Glyfada
