= Kifissia =

Kifisia Κηφισιά
- Municipality
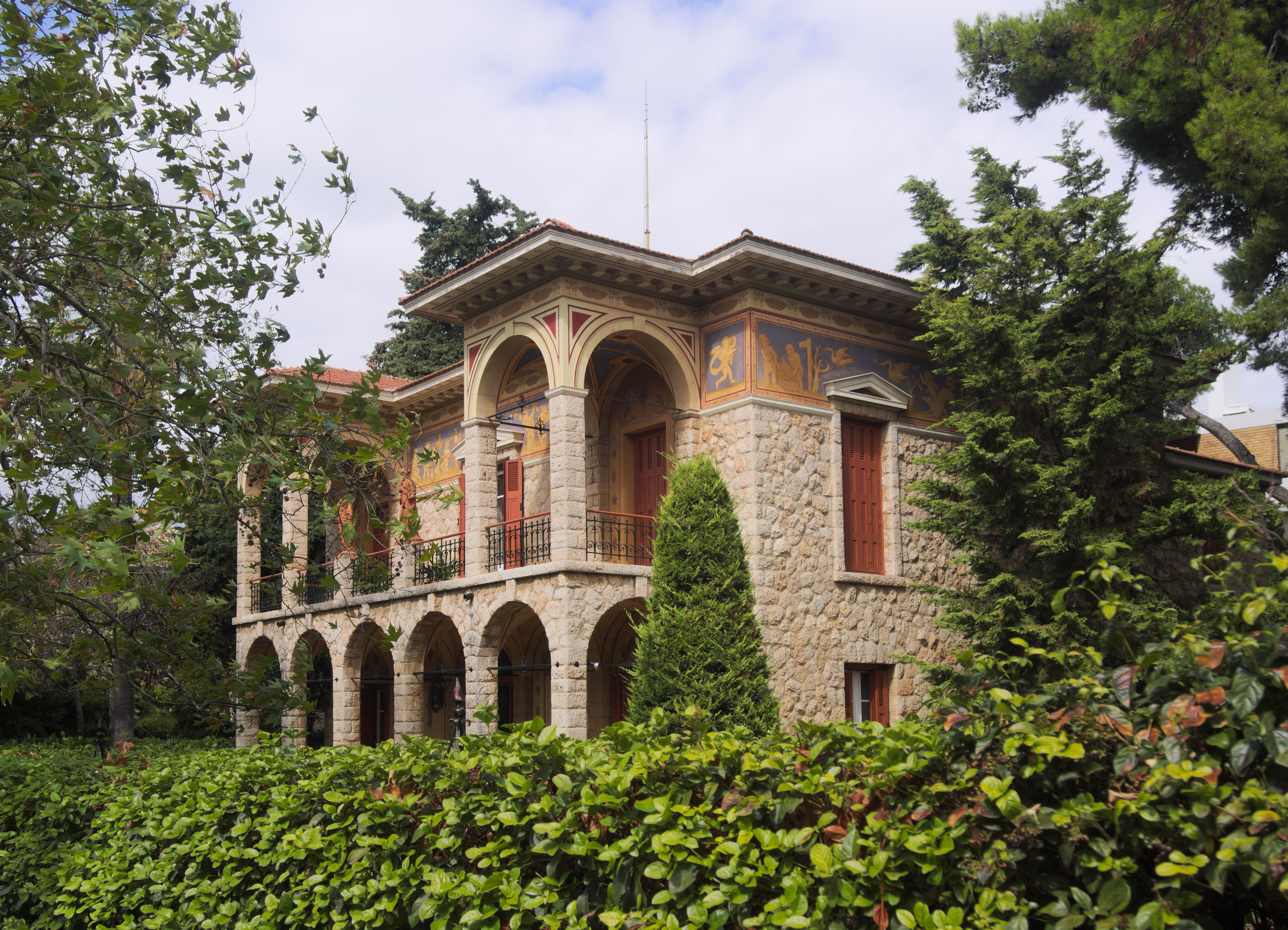
- Villa "Atlantis", work of architect Ernst Ziller (1837-1923)

- Seal

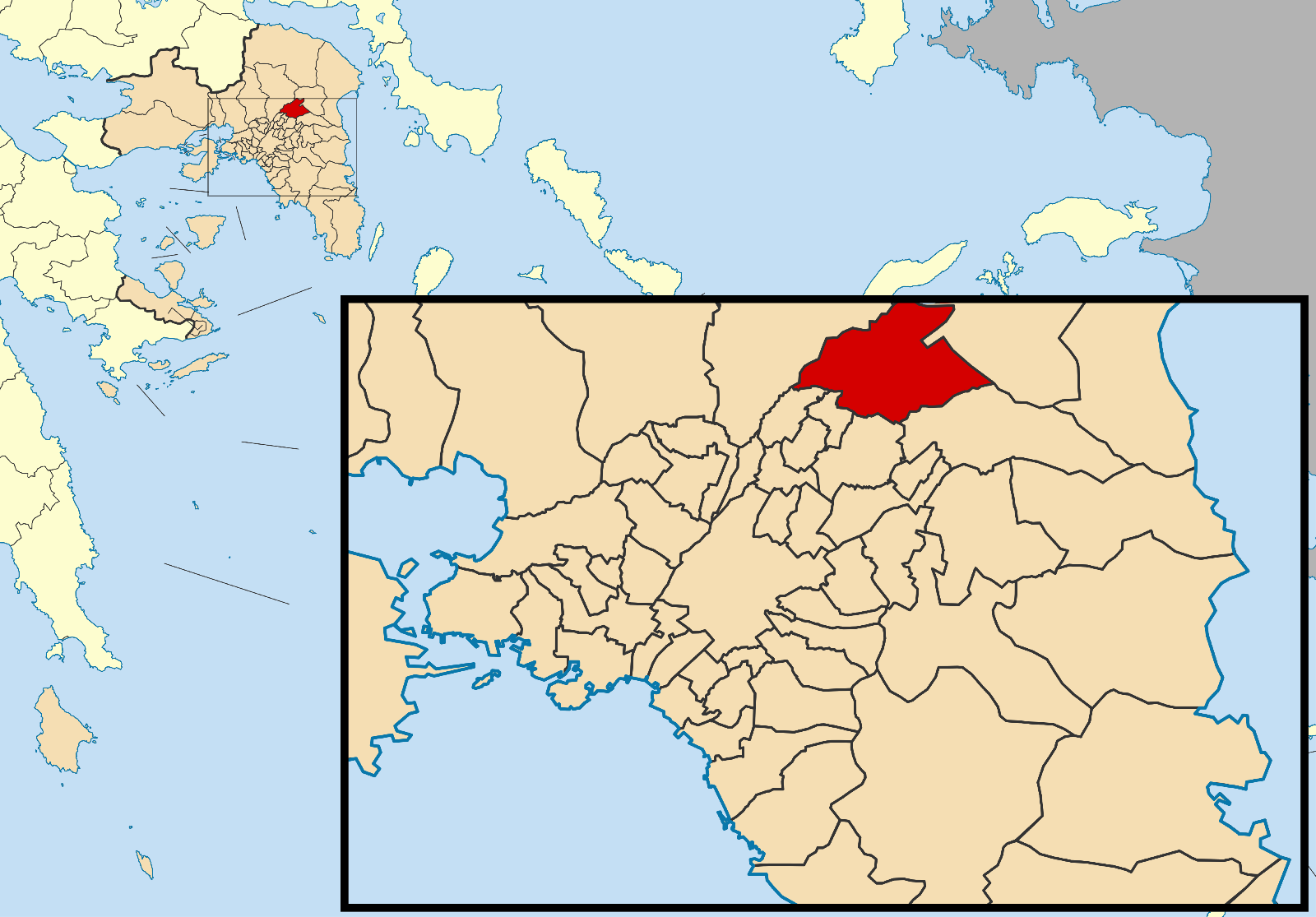

- Location within Greece
- Coordinates: 38°5′N 23°49′E
- Country: Greece
- Administrative region: Attica
- Regional unit: North Athens

Government
  - Mayor: Vasileios Xypolytas (since 2023)

Area
  - Municipality: 35.10 km^{2} (13.55 sq mi)
  - Municipal unit: 25.937 km^{2} (10.014 sq mi)
- Elevation: 290 m (950 ft)

Population (2021)
  - Municipality: 72,878
  - Density: 2,076/km^{2} (5,378/sq mi)
  - Municipal unit: 48,700
  - Municipal unit density: 1,880/km^{2} (4,860/sq mi)
- Time zone: UTC+2 (EET)
  - Summer (DST): UTC+3 (EEST)
- Postal code: 145 xx
- Area code: 210
- Vehicle registration: Z
- Website: www.kifissia.gr

Kifisia or Kifissia (historically Kephis(s)ia or Cephis(s)ia; Greek: Κηφισιά, pronounced [cifiˈsça]) is a large suburban municipality in the northern part of the Athens urban area, Attica, Greece. The municipality encompasses Kifisia proper and the areas of Nea Erythraia and Ekali. It is mainly accessed by Kifisias Avenue, starting from central Athens. It has traditionally been considered one of the most affluent suburbs of Athens and has been home to major Greek political families.

== History ==
=== Antiquity ===
==== Origins ====
The geographer Strabo mentioned Cephisia (Ancient Greek: Κηφισία) as one of the twelve original cities of Attica founded by Cecrops I, the mythical first king of Athens, as a way to unite several disparate settlements into cohesive entities as to allow unitary administration, laws and governance under one ruler. This would place its founding at some point in the Mycenaean era, part of the Bronze Age, before the time of the mythical king Theseus, who was considered the unifier of Attica (including Cephisia) into a single, Athenian city-state. Cephisia is the only of those attested twelve cities in Attica, however, that has not yielded any remarkable archaeological remains from the Bronze Age.

The city was named for the Cephisus river which was considered to sprout in its surroundings.

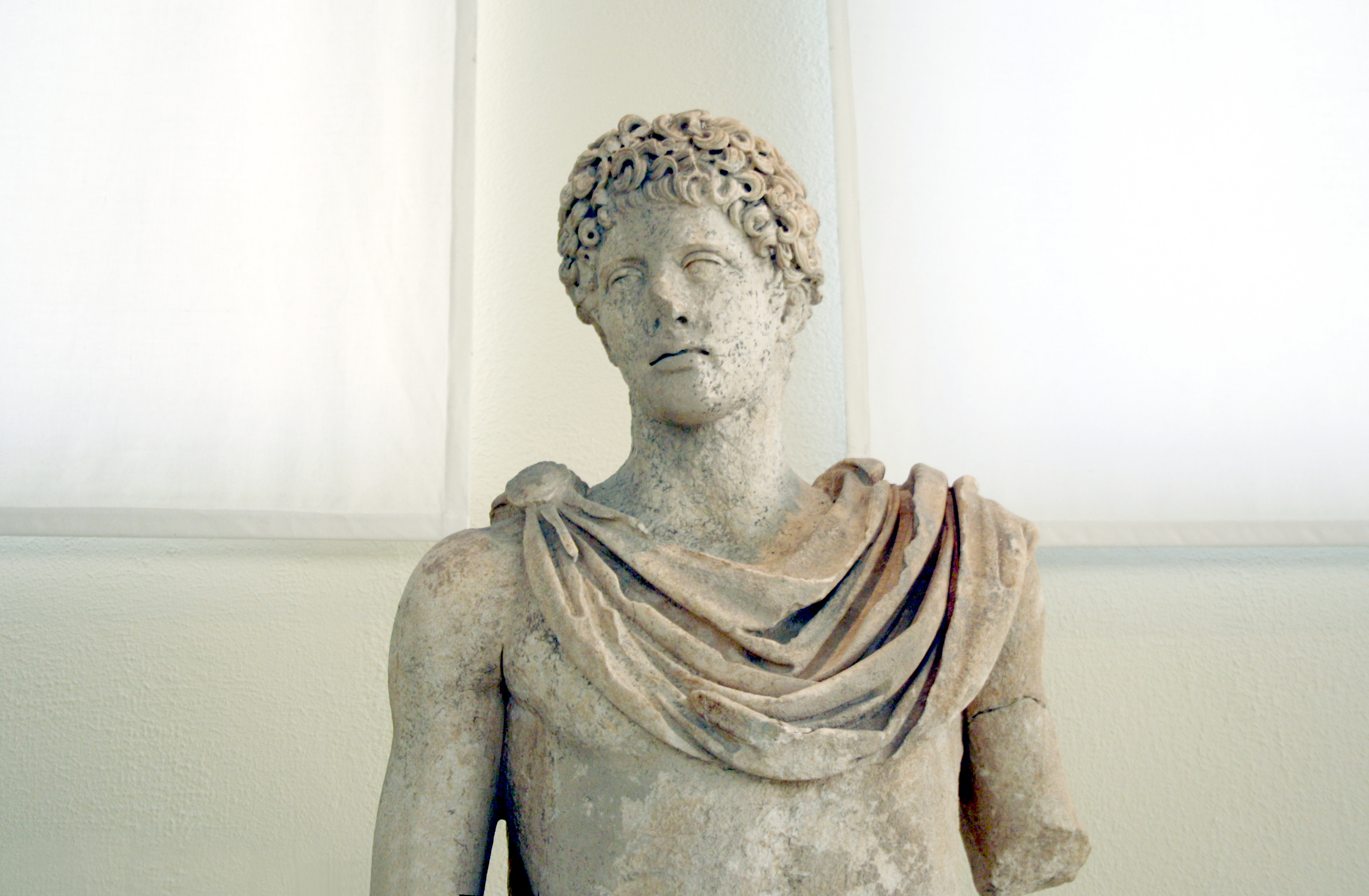
Statue of a youth from Cephisia, Piraeus Archaeological Museum

==== Archaic and Classical era ====
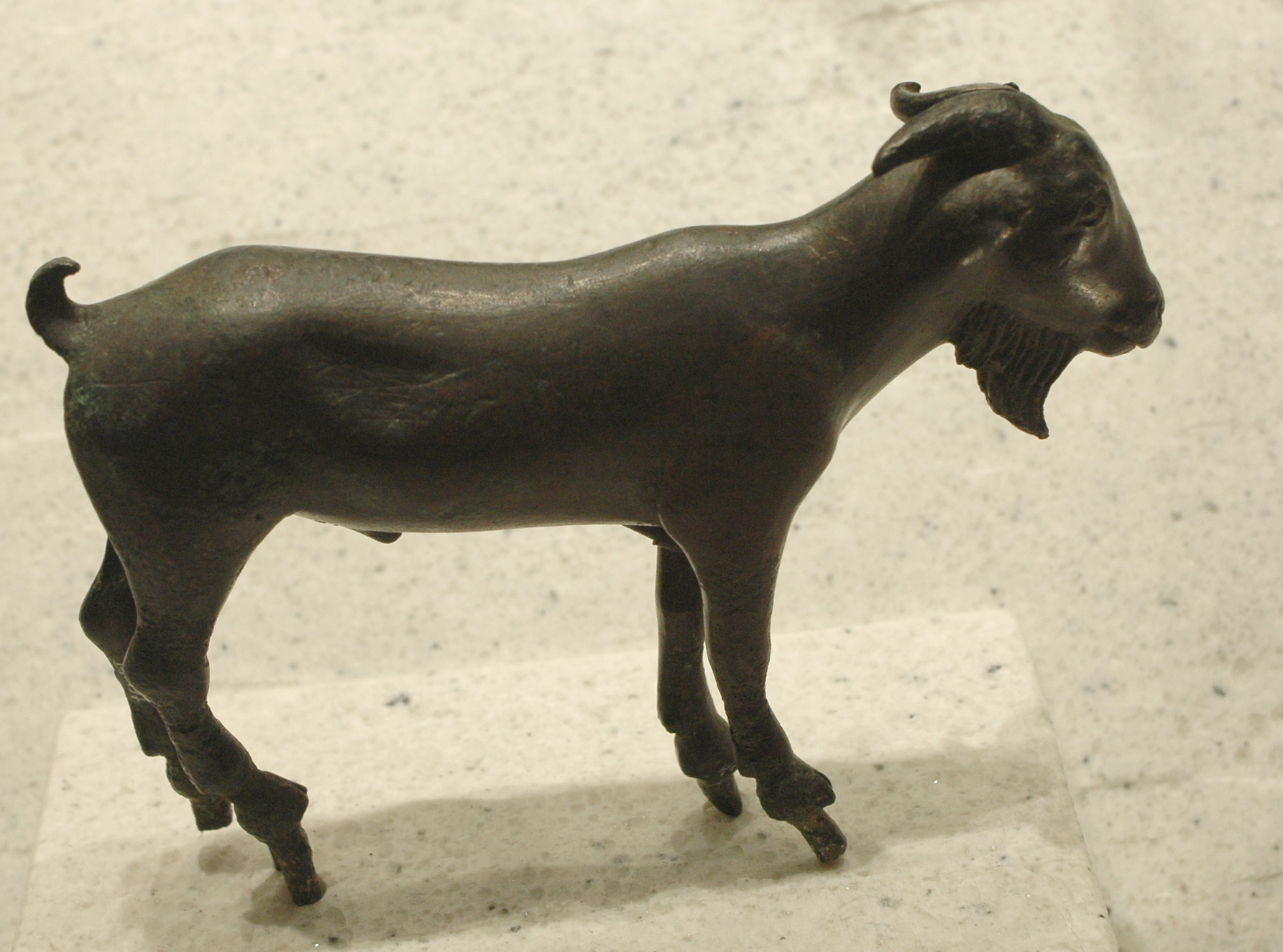
Bronze billygoat from the deme of Cephisia, 5th century BC, Louvre

Cephisia in the archaic and later classical era appears as a separate deme of the ancient Athenian state. It belonged to the Erechtheis tribe and sent six or eight delegates to the Athenian Boule (citizens' council), indicating an important, moderately-sized town. Its growth and prosperity was aided by its abundance in water (especially significant in a mostly dry Attica), large tracts of fertile land - often the subject of judicial disputes, attested to by surviving court speeches - and its strategic location at the northern edge of the Athenian plain, in the pine and barley-strewn fields between mount Pentelicus and mount Parnitha, on one of the roads to Diacria, Oropus and Boeotia. Its distance from the Athenian polis and its healthier climate and environment attracted the Athenian elite, who organised symposia in local estates.

Geographically, the deme was centred around where its centre stands today, though smaller than today's enlarged municipality. The greatest housing density seems to have been in today's Kato Kifisia, west of today's Kifisias Avenue, attested by archaeological findings that include a 200-person graveyard (4th century BC). Findings are sparser east of the modern avenue and north of the Pyrna stream (now Kokkinaras), where excavations in the areas of Kefalari, Kokkinaras and Nea Erythraia have revealed traces of the ancient eastbound road network, isolated farmhouses and huts, a second, smaller graveyard and the deme's gymnasium.

Cephisia was possibly one of the demes ravaged by the Spartans and their allies in one of their first invasions of Attica during the Peloponnesian War.

==== Roman era ====
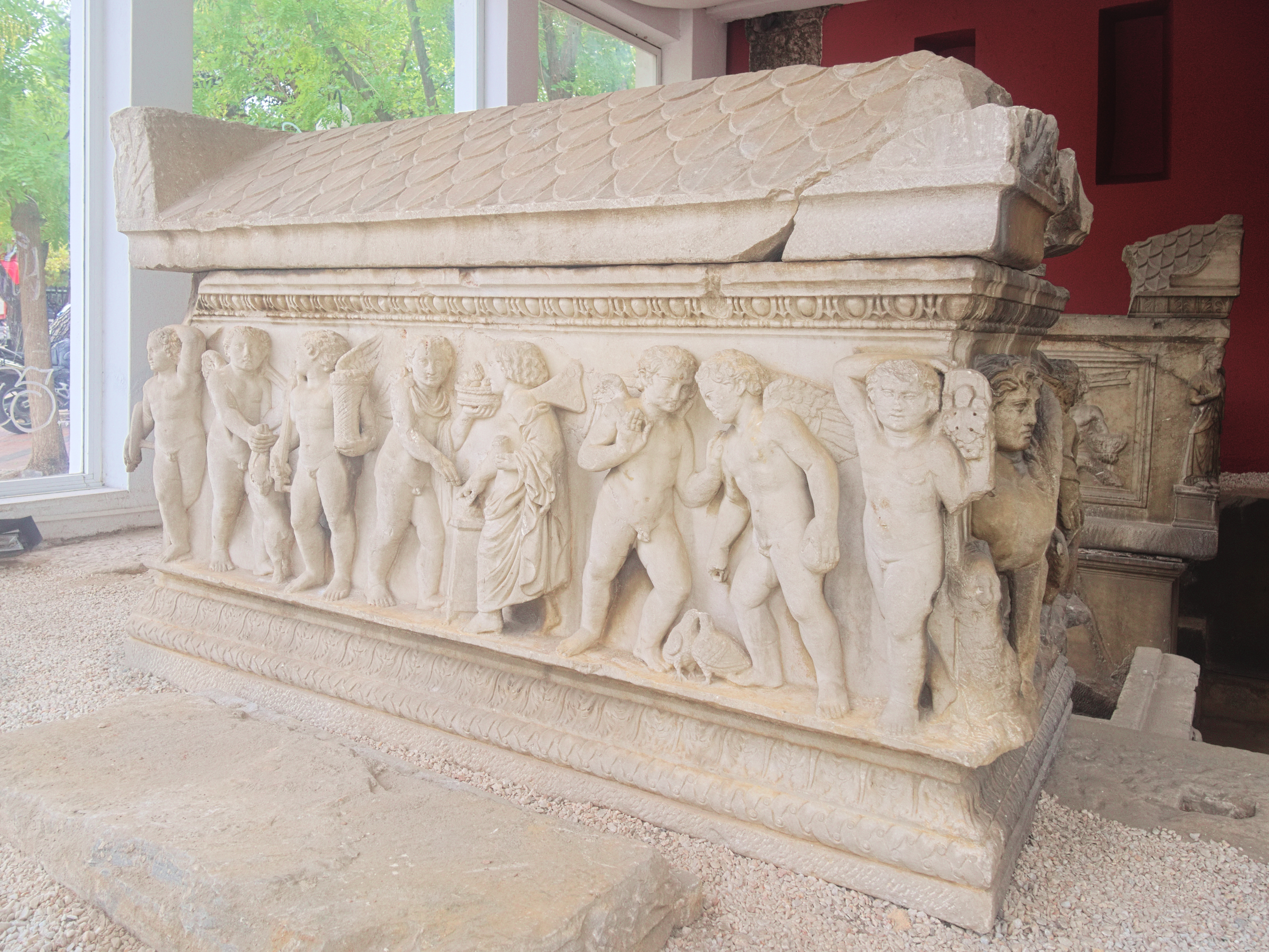
Roman sarcophagus within the Cephisia funerary monument

Roman-era Cephisia was home to the renowned dramatist Menander (circa 342-291 BC) and was already reputed as a famous retreat of philosophers by the reign of Hadrian when the wealthy benefactor Herodes Atticus of Marathon built the Villa Cephisia as his personal estate, spanning a large area right in the middle of the town, roughly between the river and where Kifisia Grove stands today. It was also common for Herodes to provide free instruction in philosophy for selected youths from Athens. Funerary monuments, most likely belonging to Herodes' kin, still stand in today's Platanou Square. Herodes also beautified a pre-existing sanctuary to the Nymphs in a cave close to the banks of the Pyrna, home to a local oracle in earlier periods.

While we were students in Athens, Herodes Atticus, a man of consular rank and of true Grecian eloquence, often invited me to his country houses near that city [...] And there at that time, while we were with him at the villa called Cephisia, both in the heat of summer and under the burning autumnal sun, we protected ourselves against the trying temperature by the shade of its spacious groves, its long, soft promenades, the cool location of the house, its elegant baths with their abundance of sparkling water, and the charm of the villa as a whole, which was everywhere melodious with plashing waters and tuneful birds.

— Aulus Gellius, Noctes Atticae, § 1.2

=== Medieval Era (335–1456) ===
Historical information about medieval Kifisia remains sparse and anecdotal in nature, following Athens into at best provincial importance during the Byzantine period. The remains of a church from the period, dedicated to the Holy Virgin of the Swallow (Panayia Chelidonou) is associated with a folk tale about a battle fought there between local people and unspecified "invaders". This chapel is a rare example of a monastery church provided with a fireplace.

Continuing the tradition of Kifisia being a spot of repose for the wealthy, after the capture of Attica and its incorporation into the Duchy of Athens in the aftermath of the Fourth Crusade, the village hosted the large estates of the feudal Frankish (later Catalan, Florentine and briefly Venetian) aristocracy, mostly between Profitis Ilias hill and the Alonia area (the word Alonia itself meaning threshing floors).

=== Ottoman Era (1456–1821) ===
In 1456, three years after the fall of Constantinople to the Ottomans in 1453, Turkish general and governor of Thessaly Turahanoğlu Ömer Bey seized Athens and all its surrounding areas, expelling the ruling Acciaioli dynasty from Attica. The conquerors seized land for themselves across Attica and Kifisia was included in such areas; an Ottoman governor eventually constructed his own tower in the area and a mosque was built where Platanou Square now stands.

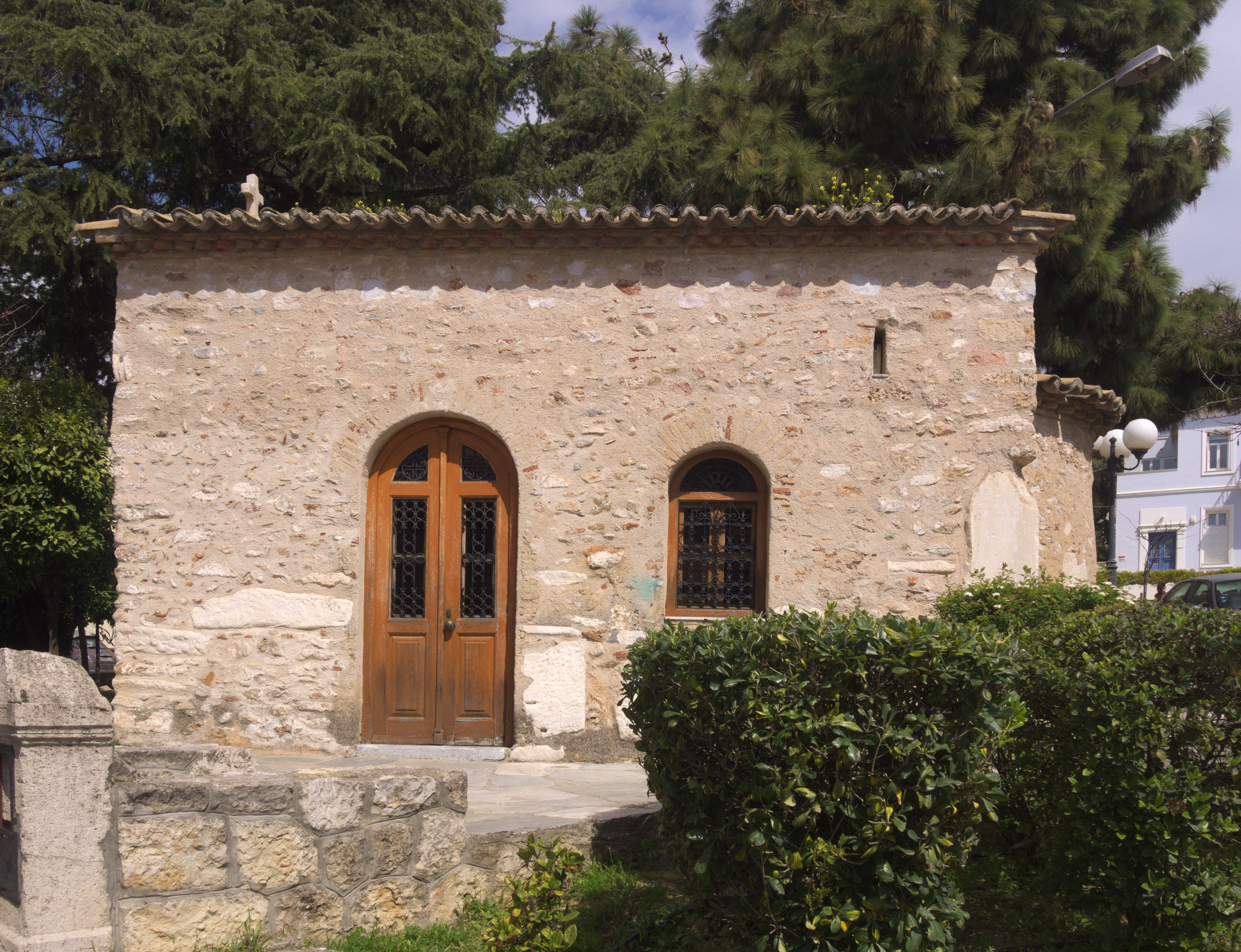
Chapel of the Forty Martyrs, built in 1562. The chapel is 150 meters away from where it was originally built, moved entirely from its original spot in 1991 in order to widen Kifisias Avenue.

Kifisia was visited by the Turkish traveller Evliya Çelebi in 1667 on his journey to Athens, providing a first-hand description:

[Kifisia] is a small town in a fertile plain, adorned with three hundred beautiful houses with tiled roofs, whose inhabitants are half Muslim and half infidel rayahs. It has a mosque, a seminary, a school, a tekke, a hammam, a large inn and ten shops. It has no other institutions. Its beautiful, crisp, white cherries are famous. Its ridges and land areas are adorned only with olive trees, and at the top of each ridge stands a small church.

— Evliya Çelebi, Seyahatname, from K. Biris' book "Evliya Çelebi's Attica", Athens, 1959

=== 19th and early 20th centuries ===
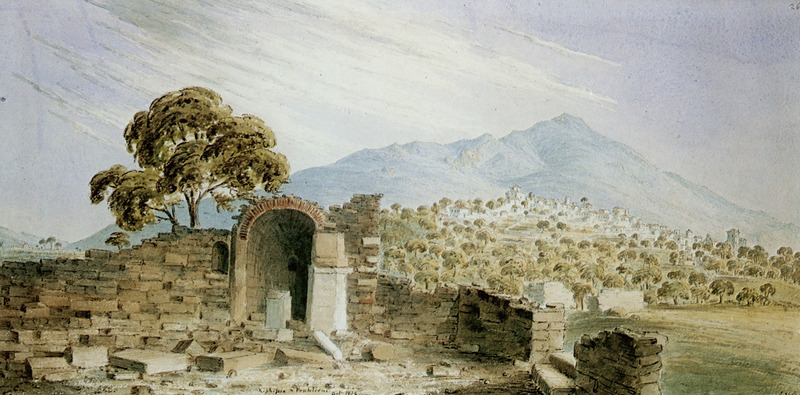
Kephissia and Pentelicus (James Skene, October 1839)

With the Ottoman exit from southern Greece in the wake of the war of Independence in the 1820s, several formerly Muslim properties were taken by the rebelling Greeks, being seized after their owners fled, bought at a pittance or handed out by the Greek state after the war. Attica and Kifisia in particular was no exception. An example is the case of Georgios Kourtis, a Kifisia local who fought with general Georgios Karaiskakis in Attica and was rewarded with the local Ottoman administrator's former house.

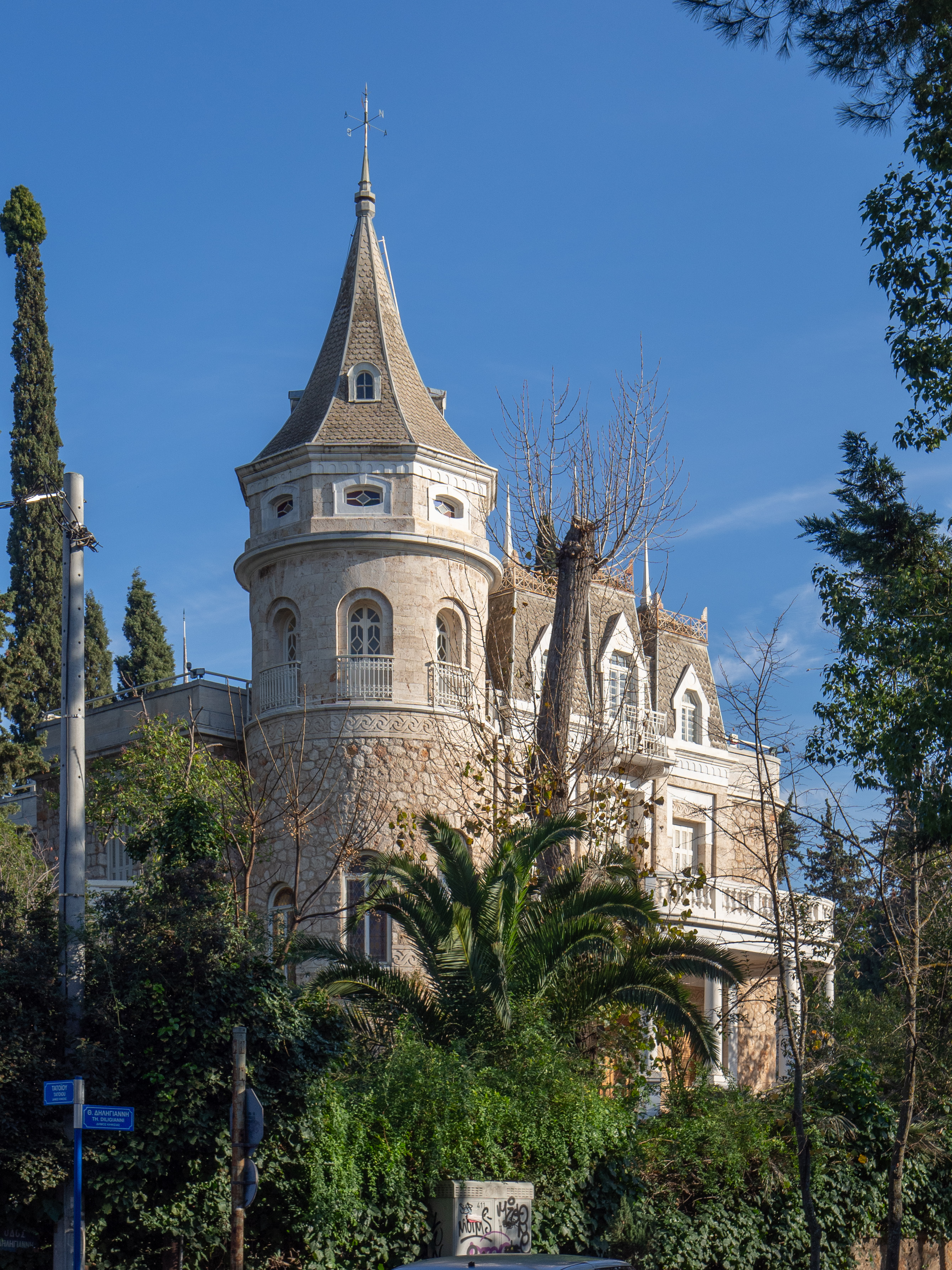
Apostolidis mansion, built 1915.

The then-distant hamlet attracted the wealthy from early on for the same reasons as historically. King Otto of Greece, most notably, had a house on what is now Othonos street and often went horse riding in the area. The village was home to an Arvanitika-speaking community (although smaller than that of neighboring Marousi), however, due to its proximity to Athens, it soon underwent a language shift, similarly to the city of Athens itself, which also saw its local dialect of Greek (Old Athenian) rapidly fade out.

The popularity of Kifisia somewhat faded during the mid-19th century, when highway robbery and brigandage in central Greece reached endemic proportions and brigands like Christos "Davelis" Natsios and Loukas "Kakarapis" Beloulias ravaged the countryside of Attica and Boeotia with near impunity. However, the gradual suppression of brigandage and the arrival of the railway in May 1885, in the form of a trans-Attica locomotive called "the Beast" (θηρίο) by the locals, ushered in a period of great development, as the suburb was seen by more and more Athenians as a holiday destination, with the perfect climate to escape the summer heat.

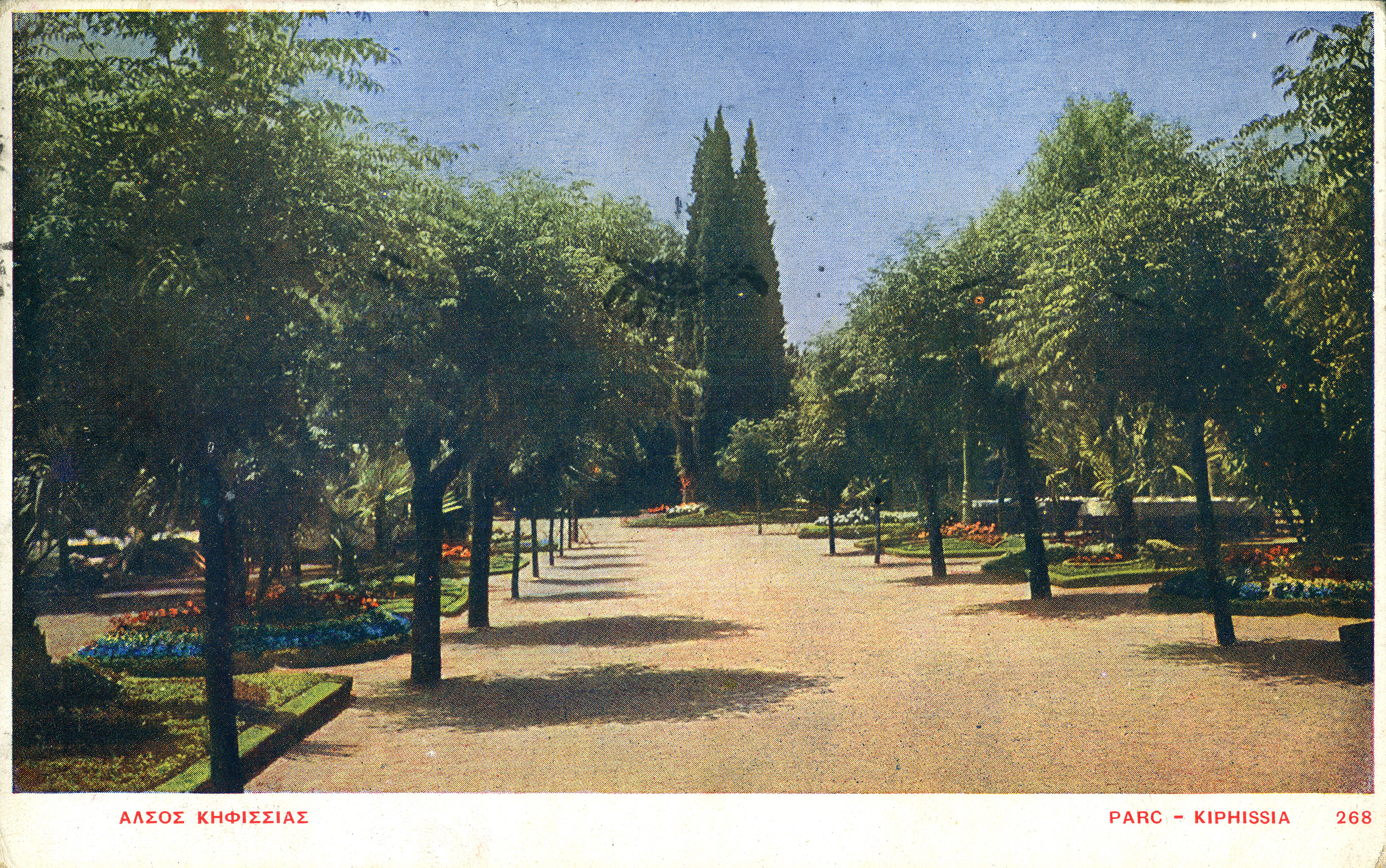
Kifisia Grove in a 1915 postcard by Aspiotis firm

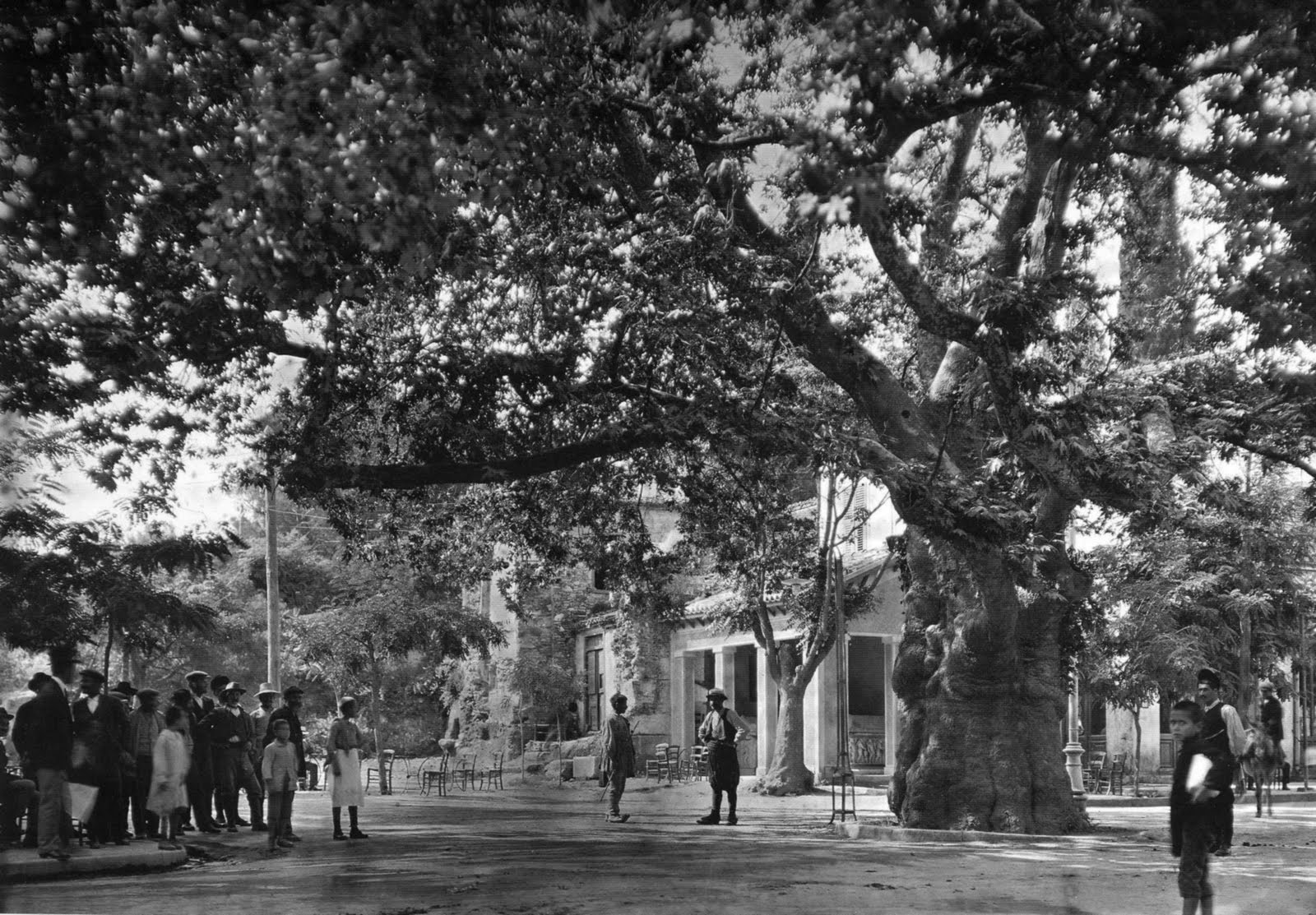
Platanos Square in 1920, photographed by Frédéric Boissonas.

It gradually became fashionable for affluent Athenian families to acquire or build their country houses and estates in Kifisia, and keen social competition led to the creation of a unique architectural environment, as villas in ever more exotic styles proliferated. For those unable to afford a place to call their own in the prestigious suburb, many opulent hotels were built by the 1920s, including Xenia, Apergi and Pentelikon. Kifisia Grove opened in the same time period and quickly became both a community hub and the site of an annual springtime flower festival that continues to this day.

The interwar period only helped raise the suburb's prestigious reputation and prominence, when the leaders of the two main rival political parties frequented different hotels in the town together with their most notable supporters. The suburb by then was already home to several highly important figures of Greek history ever since the turn of the 20th century: renowned army officer Pavlos Melas in an earlier period, businessman and mayor of Athens Emmanouil Benakis, children's writer Penelope Delta and nationalist politician and future dictator Ioannis Metaxas were only a few of them.

=== World War II and Civil War ===
==== Axis occupation ====
Dictator Ioannis Metaxas' rejection of the Italian ultimatum of surrender on the night of 27–28 October 1940, which led to the Greco-Italian war and is today commemorated as Ohi ("no") day in Greece and Greek communities abroad, took place in his house in Kifisia, at the intersection of Dagklis and Kefallinias streets, which still stands today.

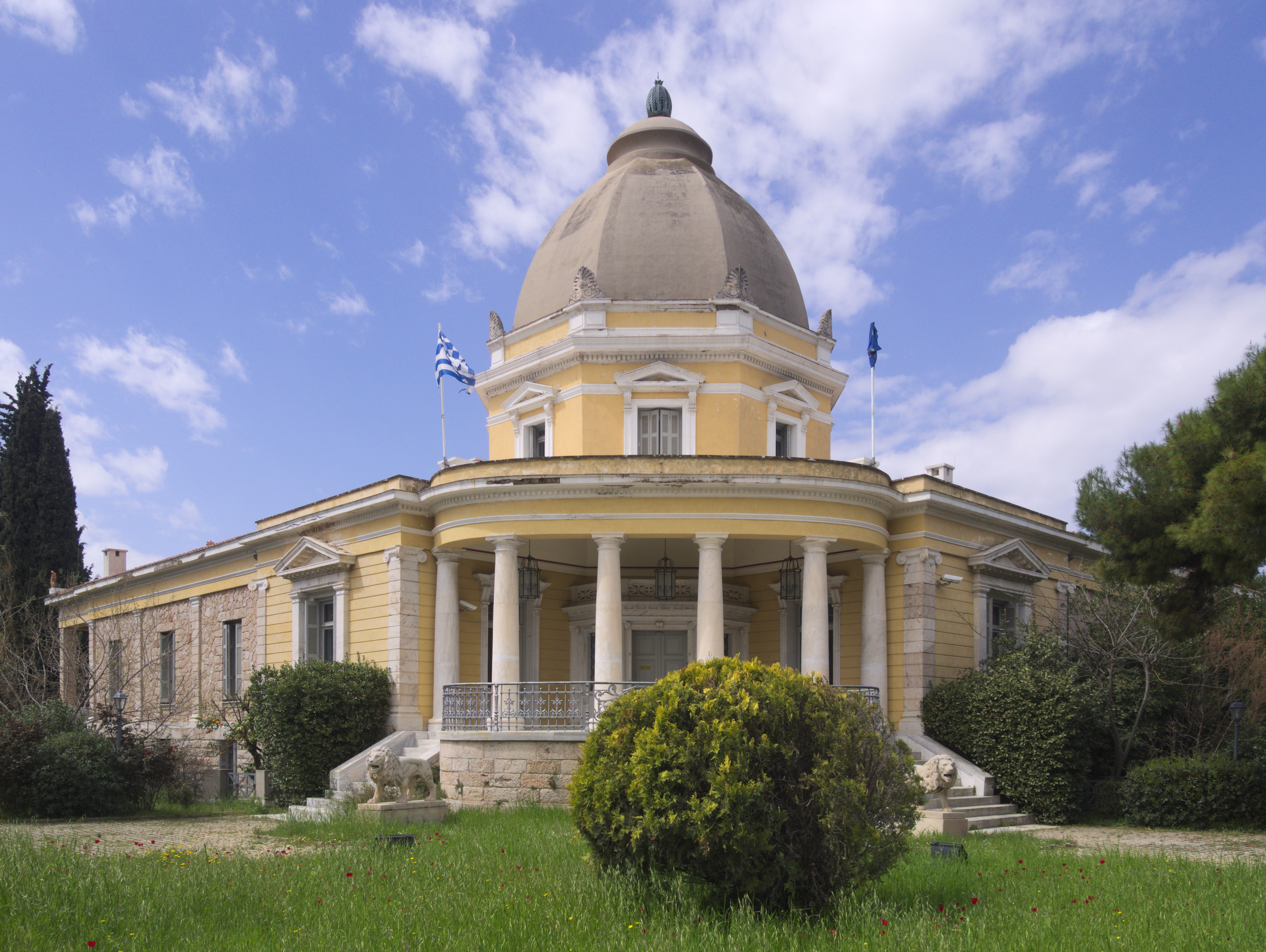
Kazoulis mansion

After the conquest of Greece by the Axis powers in 1941 and the ensuing occupation, Kifisia, as part of greater Athens, fell within the German zone of administration, under Hellmuth Felmy's "South Greece Military Command" (Befehlsbereich Südgriechenland). Kazoulis mansion, on 241 Kifisias avenue, was commandeered by the SS to serve as garrison headquarters and its basement was used for the interrogation, torture, murder and burial of captured members of the Greek resistance.

==== Battle of Kefalari (1944) ====
Following the liberation of Greece from Axis occupation in 1944, the British Royal Air Force, part of the liberating forces, established its headquarters in the area of Kefalari, and specifically in the adjacent luxury hotels of Sesil (hosting high command), Apergi (hosting general staff) and Pentelikon (hosting the officers' mess hall), due to its close proximity to Tatoi military airport. With the outbreak of the Greek Civil War in Athens in December 1944 between the Greek government of Georgios Papandreou, their British allies and the leftist National Liberation Front (EAM-ELAS), the RAF found itself isolated from the centre of Athens in the distant suburb, now a pocket surrounded by ELAS-held areas. The 5th ELAS Regiment, which participated in what was to come and was made up of fighters from the northern suburbs of Athens, including Kifisia and its environs, had already taken the roads and strategic points in and around Kifisia to aid the coming of reinforcements from the north.

On the early morning hours of December 18, a 1000-man strong ELAS force assaulted the hotel complex, defended by 124 RAF officers, 594 pilots and ground personnel, with mortars and machine guns from surrounding areas. Mechanised reinforcements from Athens were held up on the road by fighting, further isolating the defenders. The battle continued throughout the day, and despite aerial support and superior weaponry, thick fog that night hampered British visibility and gave the attackers sufficient cover to capture the hotels one-by-one after midnight by breaching their walls with explosives, but fighting in each hotel ceased before the entire building could be damaged further or outright demolished.

By the early morning hours of December 19, around 600 surviving defenders (11, out of 718 total, were killed) were taken into ELAS custody and transported outside of Attica. According to Greek civil war historian Menelaos Haralambidis, although the battle did not greatly impact the course of the clashes in Athens, it dealt a severe blow to the RAF's prestige, as it was the only time throughout the Second World War that an entire RAF command centre surrendered to the enemy.

Later that month, as a response to mass arrests by the British and Greeks in Athens, ELAS, in full control of Kifisia, took hundreds of civilian hostages from 22 to 25 December, including the wife of Ioannis Metaxas, as a means to exert pressure for hostage negotiations; the hostages were mostly members of the upper class and often prominent in political and economic life, both before and during the occupation. The hostages were marched outside of Attica to Arachova and the survivors were eventually liberated at the end of the conflict.

== Geography and transportation ==
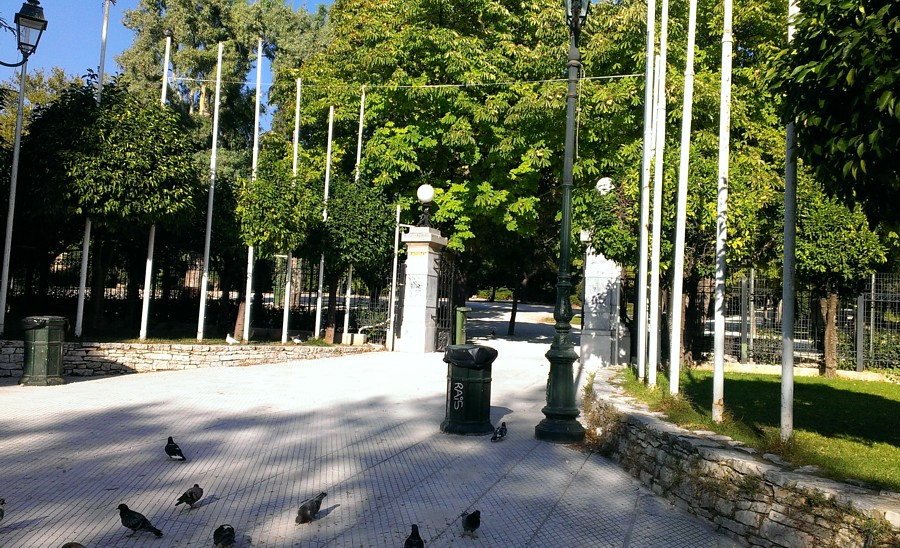
Kifisia Grove, hosting yearly floral exhibitions and other social events.

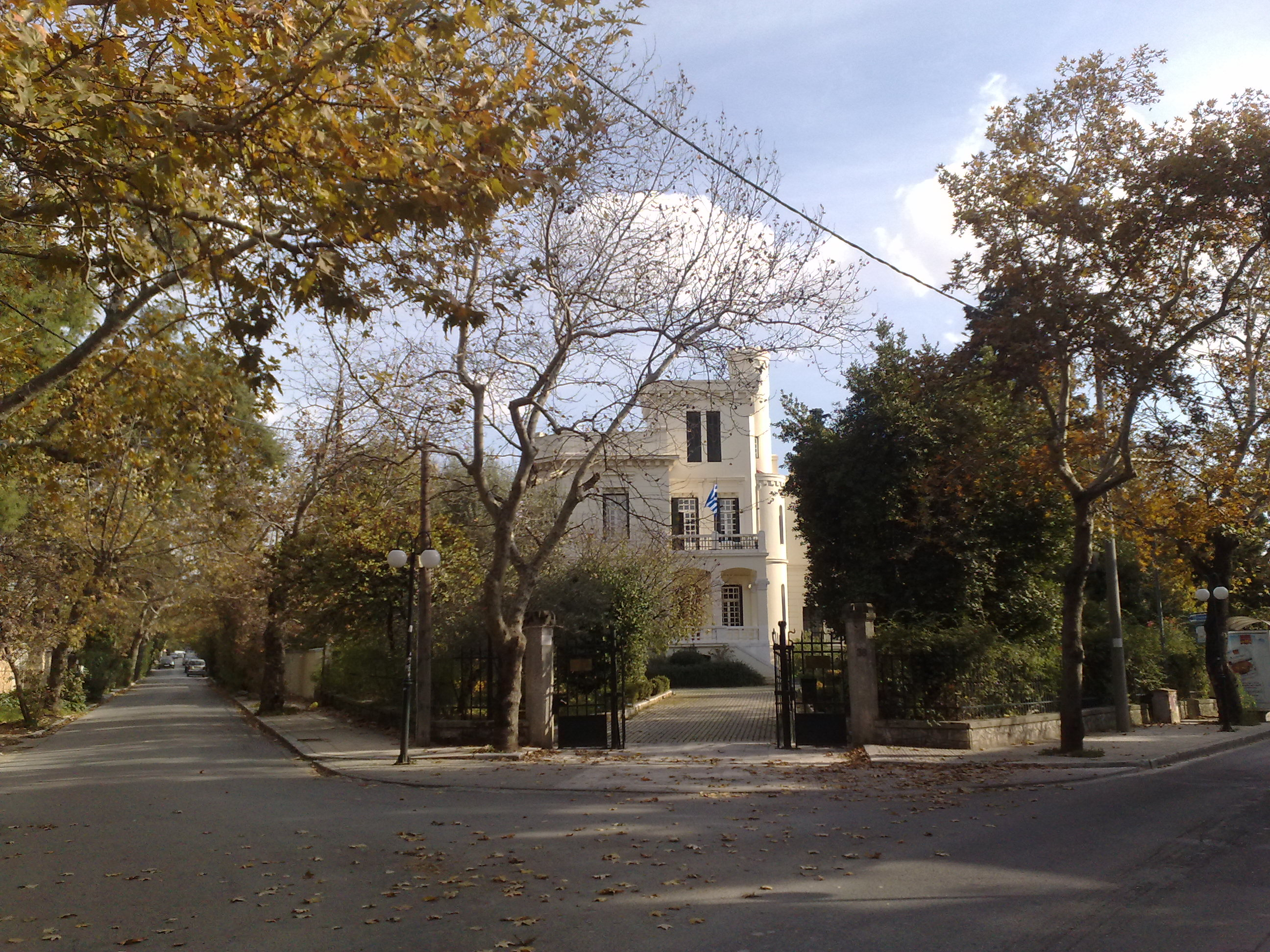
Kato Kifisia

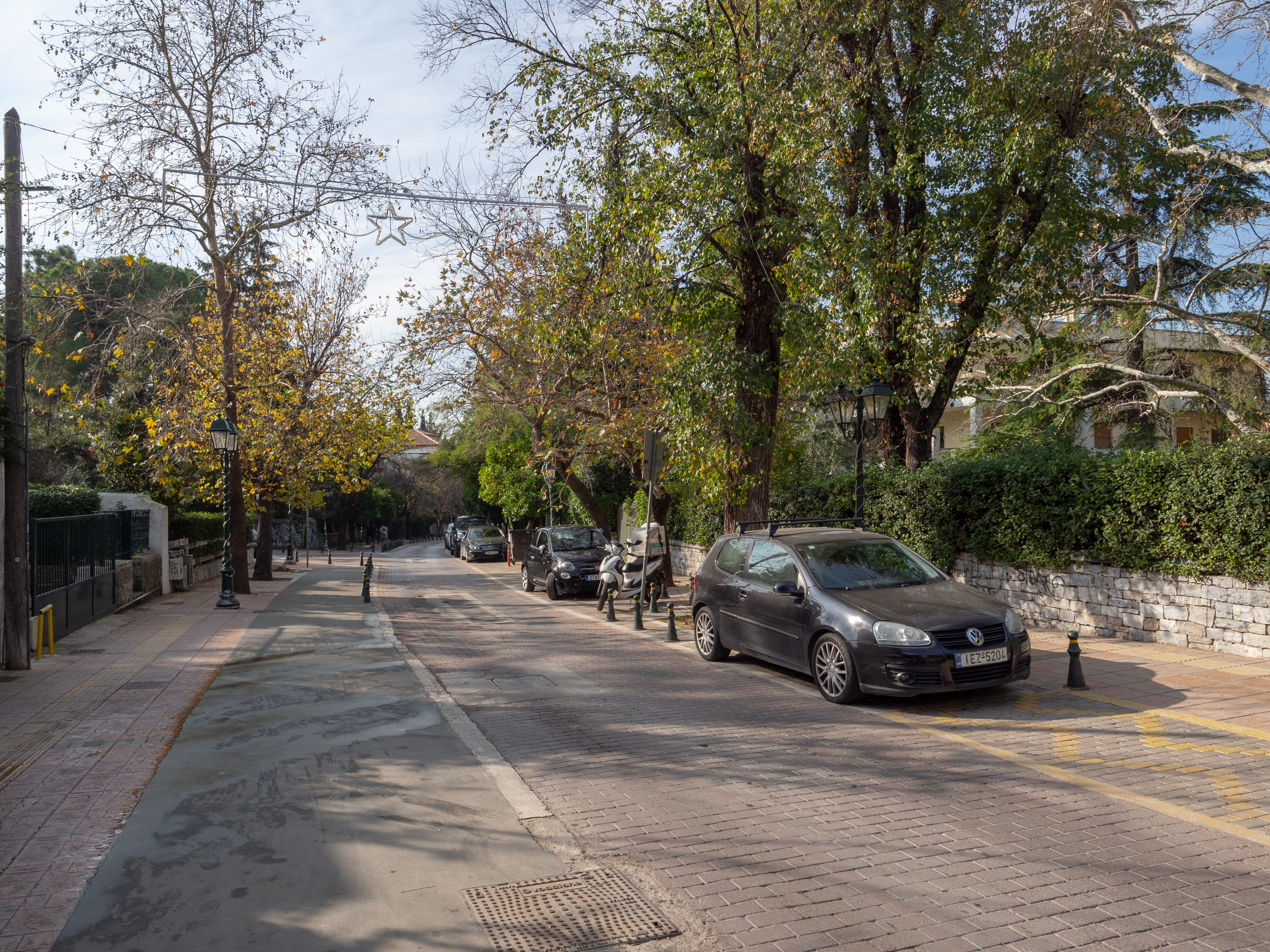
Kefalari

Kifisia is situated in central Attica, 12 km northeast of central Athens, in the northernmost part of the Athenian (or Attic) plain, spread across the mostly flat area between the westernmost ridges of mount Penteli to its east and the Kifisos river to the west. The built-up area of Kifisia is continuous with those of the neighbouring suburbs of Lykovrysi, Marousi and Pefki. The center of Kifisia sits at 290 meters above sea levels, with a maximum of 330 meters in the parcel of Politeia (also the tallest altitude in Athens' urban area).

The main neighborhoods of Kifisia are Adames, Ano Kifisia, Kato Kifisia, Alonia, Kefalari, Nea Kifisia and Politeia. The oldest areas are around Kato Kifisia, Kefalari and Alonia, while other areas were mostly built up after the Second World War and some, like much of Politeia, as recently as into the 80s and 90s.

The most important thoroughfare is Kifisias Avenue, crossing the entire suburb north-south and connecting it with central Athens, the A6 toll motorway (Attiki Odos) to the south and Dionysos to the north. Other avenues exist, smaller and only locally important, connecting the different neighborhoods of the wider municipality with each other, as well as with neighboring municipalities. Some of the most important are Tatoiou, Charilaou Trikoupi, Elaion and Agion Saranta.

Kifisia station is the north terminus of Athens Metro Line 1, originally built in the 1950s, although the location has been used as a train station for longer. The main bus lines are 550, 721, Α7, 503 and 504.

== Climate ==
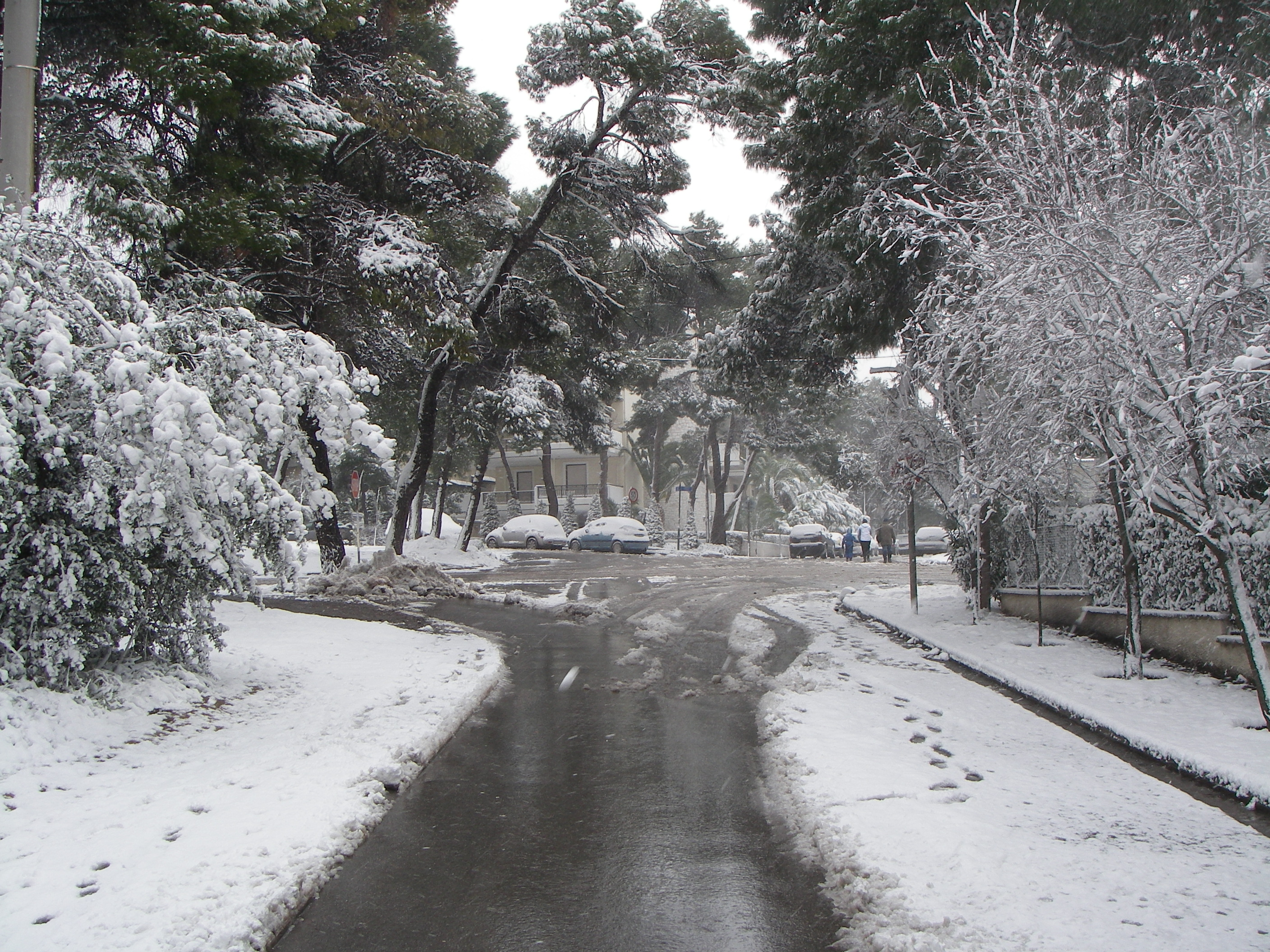
Kifisia in snow. Snow is more common in Kifisia compared to Athens due to increased elevation and proximity to mount Penteli.

Kifisia has a hot-summer Mediterranean climate (Csa) with hot, dry summers and cool, rainy winters. Owing to its slightly higher elevation and increased foliage in comparison to Athens, Kifisia, similarly to other areas on the northernmost edges of the Athenian plain, has a lower mean annual temperature than downtown Athens and the coastal parts of the urban area (16.1 °C, according to the 1956–2010 annual average of the adjacent weather station of Tatoi), though this has slightly increased in recent years.

Yearly precipitation totals around 450 mm, one of the highest values for the whole Athenian plain, mostly due to the higher amounts of precipitation received caused by lake-effect rain or snow from the Aegean Sea to the north-east in the winter months, on one hand, and the somewhat more frequent occasional summer thunderstorms, when compared to the rest of the city, on the other. Snow in particular, though only occasional, can cause heavy disruption to daily life as it occasionally falls in large amounts during short periods. Notably, snow accumulation had reached 80 cm during a severe snowstorm on 4–6 January 2002.

Climate data for Tatoi, 235 m asl (1956-2010)
Month	Jan	Feb	Mar	Apr	May	Jun	Jul	Aug	Sep	Oct	Nov	Dec	Year
Mean daily maximum °C (°F)	11.7 (53.1)	12.5 (54.5)	14.9 (58.8)	19.4 (66.9)	25.0 (77.0)	29.9 (85.8)	32.1 (89.8)	31.9 (89.4)	27.9 (82.2)	22.4 (72.3)	17.5 (63.5)	13.2 (55.8)	21.5 (70.8)
Mean daily minimum °C (°F)	3.4 (38.1)	3.6 (38.5)	5.1 (41.2)	7.9 (46.2)	12.1 (53.8)	16.5 (61.7)	19.5 (67.1)	19.6 (67.3)	15.8 (60.4)	12.0 (53.6)	8.0 (46.4)	5.1 (41.2)	10.7 (51.3)
Average precipitation mm (inches)	67.5 (2.66)	50.9 (2.00)	49.7 (1.96)	24.6 (0.97)	23.2 (0.91)	10.3 (0.41)	10.9 (0.43)	5.5 (0.22)	19.2 (0.76)	51.3 (2.02)	59.2 (2.33)	79.7 (3.14)	452 (17.81)
Source: Hellenic National Meteorological Service

== Municipality ==
The municipality of Kifisia was formed during the 2011 local government reform by the merger of the Ekali, Kifisia and Nea Erythraia municipalities, that became municipal units of the larger administrative entity. The three remain separate only as distinct areas and communities within the same administrative entity. The municipality has an area of 35.100 km^{2} and the municipal unit of Kifisia, the largest, 25.937 km^{2}.

== Economy and Tourism ==
Eltrak, Ellaktor, Eurobank Ergasias, Kioleides, and Metaxa have their head offices in Kifisa. Accenture, Barcleys, BP, Ferrari, Metro S.A., Volvo and others have their Greek offices in Kifisia.

Aegean Airlines formerly had its head office in Kifisia.

Goulandris Museum of Natural History is situated in the heart of Kifisia and has collections of exhibits of Greek nature and wildlife, including fossils.

== Sports ==
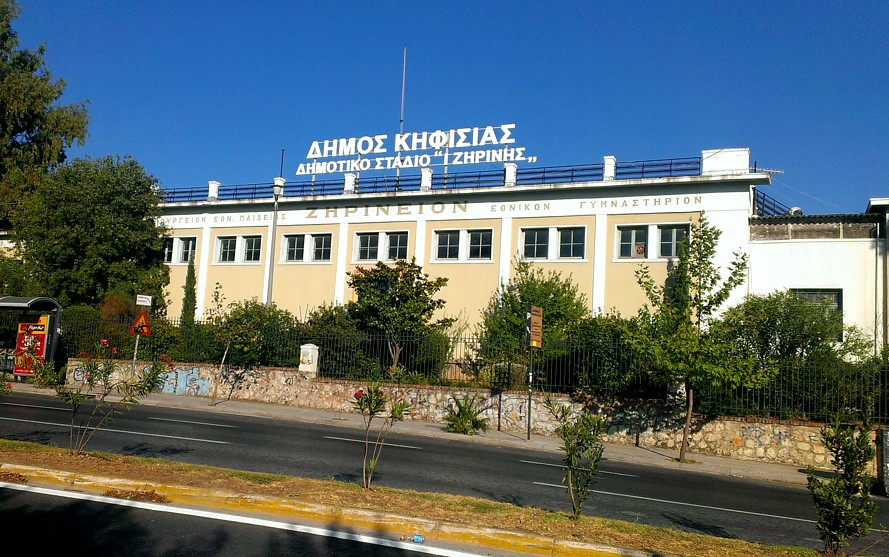
Zirineio Sports Center

Kifisia has several sport clubs in different sports. The most notable among them are ZAON, a club with many panhellenic titles in Greek women's volleyball, Kifissia AC, which plays almost constantly in men's volleyball first division (A1 Ethniki) and participates in Super League Greece, and Nea Kifissia B.C. which plays in basketball first division (Greek Basket League). Kifisia is also the seat of Athina 90 (most times winner in Futsal League) and AOH Hymettus (most times winner in Field Hockey League). Iraklis Kifissias has a presence in A1 Women's Category, with more than 200 athletes in Iraklis Kifisias Volleyball Academy.

Sport clubs based in Kifissia
Club	Founded	Sports	Achievements
Kifissia AC	1932	Volleyball	Presence in A1 Ethniki
A.E. Kifisia F.C. (Former: AO Kifissia, Elpidoforos)	2012 (1932) (1971)	Football	Presence in the Super League Greece
Iraklis Kifissias	1992	Volleyball	Presence in A1 Womans Category, with more than 200 athletes in Iraklis Kifissias Academy
ZAON Kifissia	1966	Volleyball, Basketball	Panhellenic titles in women volleyball
Athina 90	1990	Futsal	Panhellenic titles in Futsal
AOH Hymettus	1990	Field Hockey	Panhellenic titles in Field Hockey
Nea Kifissia B.C.	1996	Basketball	Presence in A1 Ethniki

== Historical population ==
Year	Municipal unit	Municipality
1951	13,124	-
1961	14,193	-
1971	20,082	-
1981	31,876	-
1991	39,084	56,160
2001	45,015	66,484
2011	47,332	71,259
2021	48,700	72,878

== Notable people ==
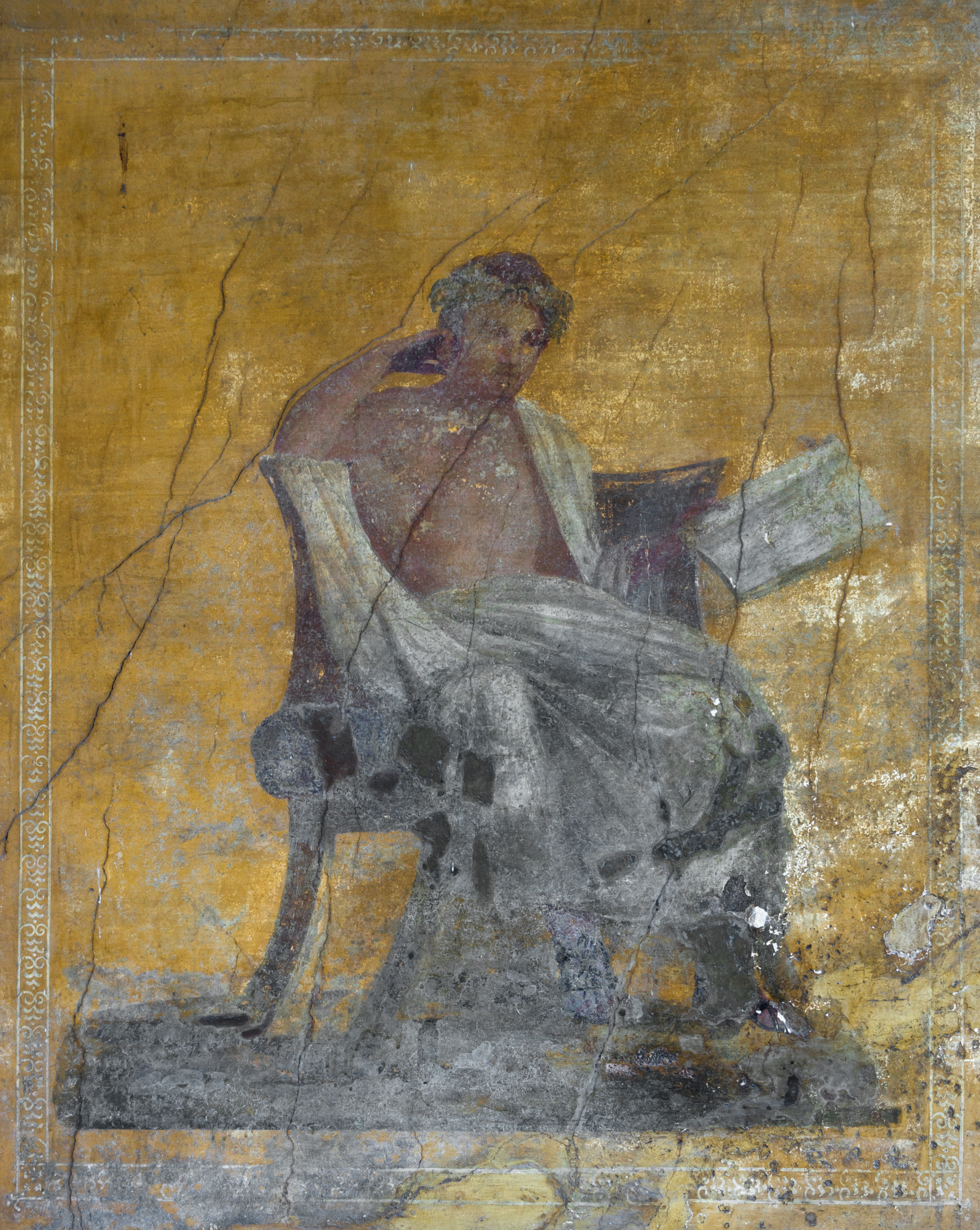
Fresco of Menander from Pompeii

- Menander (circa 342-291 BC), dramatist, born in Kifisia
- Emmanuel Benakis, merchant and politician, died in Kifisia
- Andreas Empeirikos (1901 in Romania - August 3, 1975), poet, died in Kifisia
- Penelope Delta (1874 Alexandria – 27 April 1941)
- Theodoros Pangalos (1878–1952), general, died in Kifisia
- Themistoklis Sophoulis (1860–1949), politician, died in Kifisia
- Ioannis Metaxas (12 April 1871 – 29 January 1941), politician, dictator and major general of the Hellenic Army, died in Kifisia
- Evgenios Spatharis (1924–2009), shadow theatre artist, born in Kifisia
- Antonis Samaras (born 1951), politician and grandson of Penelope Delta
