= Lykovrysi =

Lykovrysi Λυκόβρυση
- Municipal unit
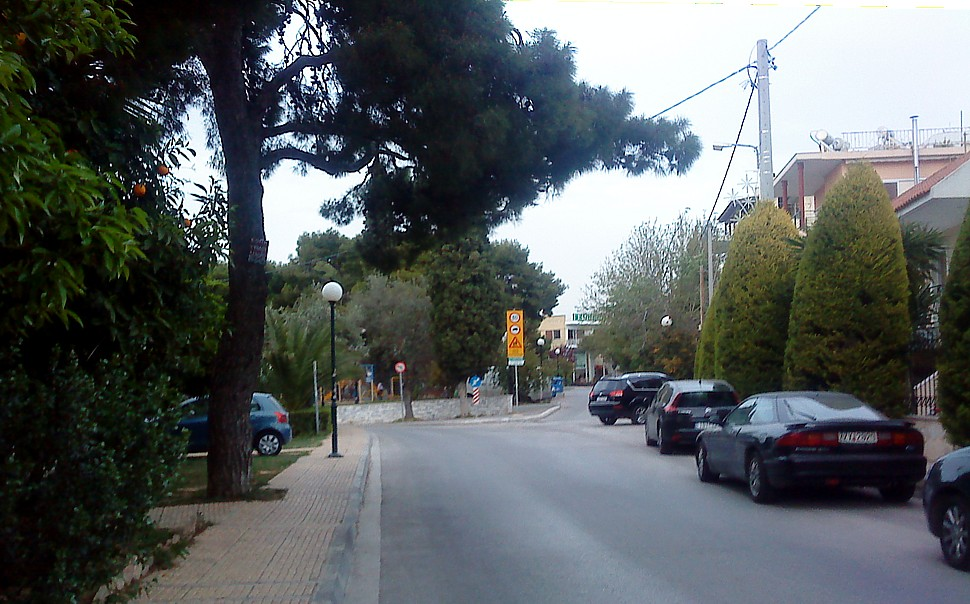
- Neighbourhood at Lykovrysi

- Location within North Athens regional unit

- Location within Greece
- Coordinates: 38°4′N 23°47′E
- Country: Greece
- Administrative region: Attica
- Regional unit: North Athens
- Municipality: Lykovrysi-Pefki

Area
  - Municipal unit: 1.950 km^{2} (0.753 sq mi)
- Elevation: 230 m (750 ft)

Population (2021)
  - Municipal unit: 9,705
  - Municipal unit density: 4,977/km^{2} (12,890/sq mi)
- Time zone: UTC+2 (EET)
  - Summer (DST): UTC+3 (EEST)
- Postal code: 141 23/141 xx
- Area code: 210 28
- Vehicle registration: Yx, Zx, Ix (excluding ZA and IN)
- Website: www.likovrisipefki.gr

Lykovrysi (Greek: Λυκόβρυση; formerly Γλυκόβρυση Glykovrysi) is a town in the North Athens regional unit, Attica, Greece. Since the 2011 local government reform it is part of the municipality Lykovrysi-Pefki, of which it is a municipal unit/community.

== Geography ==
Lykovrysi is located 11 km northeast of Athens city centre, east of the small river Kifisos. The municipal unit has an area of 1.950 km^{2}. The built-up area of Lykovrysi is continuous with those of the neighbouring towns of Metamorfosi, Pefki and Irakleio. Greek National Road 1 passes through the town.

Τhere are two primary schools, the "1st and the 2nd Primary School of Lykovrysi" a gymnasium (junior high school), the "1st Gymnasium of Lykovrysi", a lyceum (senior high school), the "1st Lyceum of Lykovrysi", as well as St. Catherine's British Embassy School.

== Historical population ==
Year	Population
1981	4,437
1991	5,965
2001	8,116
2011	9,650
2021	9,705

== Education ==
St.Catherine's British School in Athens is located in the town.

== See also ==
- List of municipalities of Attica
