= Aloula =

Aloula (Greek: Αλλούλα) is a location on Penteliko Mountain, Attica, Greece. Its interest and importance stem from the fact that much of the marble used to build the Parthenon and other famous monuments of antiquity were from the so-called "Pendeliko" marble, i.e. from this mountain. Unlike the south side of the mountain, however, the north side remains in use as a quarry even today. Aloula, however, was decommissioned in 1940 with the start of the Second World War.

== Name and early history ==
The name "Aloula" belongs to a contractor who worked at the site at the time before it closed. The north side of Mount Pentelicus remained unused for marbleworks until 1898, when "Marmor Ltd" bought the mining rights from Jacob Steiger and set out to solve the problem of transporting the end product. It took them almost two years to finish the infrastructure that allowed moving marble down to the main train station at Dionysos. (Today this location is used as an outdoor theatre.)

== Legal status ==
The modern reconstruction of Aloula as a "park of marblework artistry" has been widely accused of an attempt of corporate greenwashing. Despite the fact that the current owners of the area and the mining rights invested heavily in the project, it lies unused and undeveloped any further because it lies in a much argued over region which has suffered numerous forest fires and is considered one of the few major areas of forest in Attica.

== Aloula operations ==
Unlike the "famous" south side's large pieces of fine white marble, Aloula only had potential for smaller pieces. It was still the much sought-after fine white stone, but at the beginning of the 20th century the main commercial uses for this were kitchen or bathroom sinks, cemetery crosses and pavements.

== Reconstruction ==
In 1994, more than half a century after it was abandoned, the reconstruction project began. A team of marbleworkers from the island of Paros with experience of working on a similar project on the south side of Pendeli were called in. They had to unearth the unused paths, train tracks and other details of everyday working life in Aloula and then decide how to reconstruct and show them. They started by constructing a staircase to connect various functional areas of the quarry, such as the tool construction area, the sheer cliff, living quarters and the transportation area. Despite their experience, much of what we see today is more the product of modern decisions for the museum than any sort of archaeological research. They worked particularly hard at reconstructing the house of Aloula himself and were rewarded by finding a large number of rare old quarrying tools in the shed next to it.
