= Japanese Community School of Athens =

- アテネ日本人学校; Ιαπωνική Σχολή Αθηνών

Location
- 33 Pindou St, Ano-Pefki 151-21, Athens Greece; Pefki; Greece; 38.0118046°N 23.737783300000046°E

Information
- Type: Japanese international school
- Established: 25 February, 1977
- Closed: April 2007
- Website: geocities.jp/arinokey/

The Japanese Community School of Athens (Japanese: アテネ日本人学校 Atene Nihonjin Gakkō, Greek: Ιαπωνική Σχολή Αθηνών) was a Japanese international school in the Ano-Pefki (Άνω Πεύκη) area of Pefki, Greece in the Athens urban area.

The school was designated on February 25, 1977 (Showa 52) and certified on December 18, 1992 (Heisei 4). It closed in April 2007 (Heisei 19).) It was decertified on March 31, 2012 (Heisei 24).

The school had a magazine, Tabidachi (旅立ち).
