= Nea Erythraia =

Nea Erythraia Νέα Ερυθραία
- Municipal unit
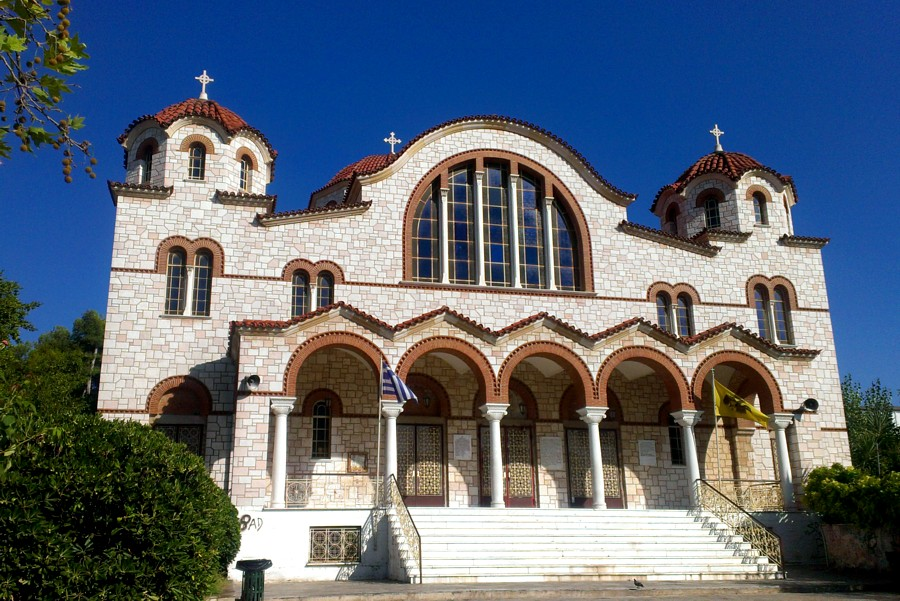
- Evangelistria Church

- Location within North Athens

- Location within Greece
- Coordinates: 38°5′N 23°49′E
- Country: Greece
- Administrative region: Attica
- Regional unit: North Athens
- Municipality: Kifisia

Area
  - Municipal unit: 4.831 km^{2} (1.865 sq mi)
- Elevation: 310 m (1,020 ft)

Population (2021)
  - Municipal unit: 18,604
  - Municipal unit density: 3,851/km^{2} (9,974/sq mi)
- Time zone: UTC+2 (EET)
  - Summer (DST): UTC+3 (EEST)
- Postal code: 146 xx
- Area code: 210
- Vehicle registration: Z
- Website: www.dne.gov.gr

Nea Erythraia (Greek: Νέα Ερυθραία) is a town and a suburb in the northeastern part of the Athens agglomeration, Greece. It was settled by Greek refugees from Erythraia (now Cesme, Turkey) after the 1923 Population Exchange. Since the 2011 local government reform it is part of the municipality Kifissia, of which it is a municipal unit.

== Geography ==
Nea Erythraia is situated at the western end of the forested Penteli mountain range. The municipal unit has an area of 4.831 km^{2}. The small river Kifisos forms the northwestern border of the municipal unit. Nea Erythraia is situated 14 km northeast of Athens city centre. The built-up area of Nea Erythraia is continuous with that of the neighbouring suburb Kifisia. The A1 motorway, Greek National Road 1 and Greek National Road 83 pass through the town.

For many years, Nea Erythraia was home to the senior division of Campion, one of Greece's oldest English-language schools.

On September 14, 2004, the paralympic flame arrived in Nea Erythraia as it travelled from Marathon.

== Historical population ==
Year	Population
1981	10,100
1991	12,993
2001	15,439
2011	17,379
2021	18,604
