= Ekali =

Ekali Εκάλη
- Municipal unit
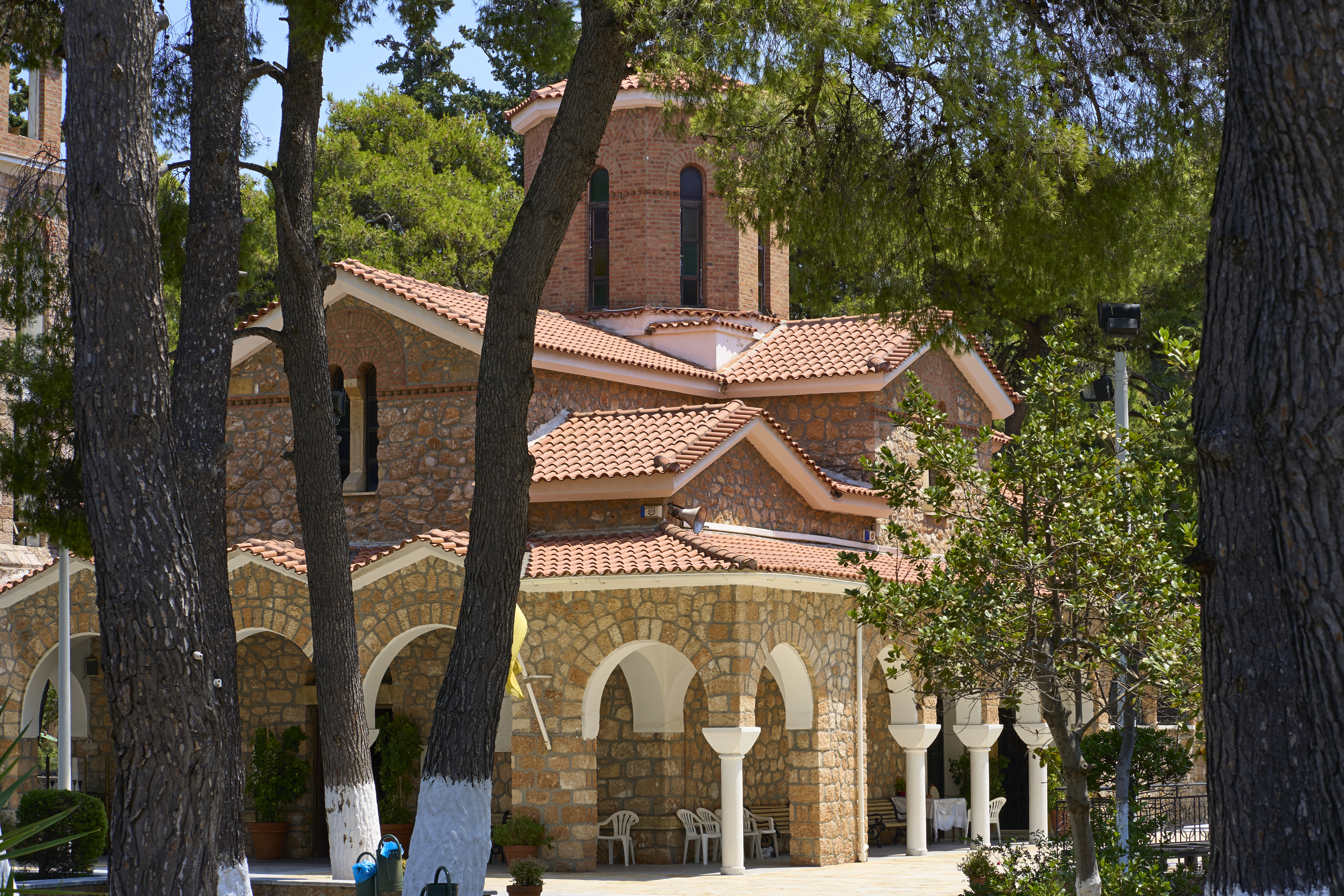
- The church of Agia Marina

- Location within North Athens regional unit

- Location within Greece
- Coordinates: 38°6′N 23°50′E
- Country: Greece
- Administrative region: Attica
- Regional unit: North Athens
- Municipality: Kifisia

Area
  - Municipal unit: 4.332 km^{2} (1.673 sq mi)
- Elevation: 330 m (1,080 ft)

Population (2021)
  - Municipal unit: 5,574
  - Municipal unit density: 1,287/km^{2} (3,333/sq mi)
- Time zone: UTC+2 (EET)
  - Summer (DST): UTC+3 (EEST)
- Postal code: 145 78
- Area code: 210
- Vehicle registration: Z

Ekali (Greek: Εκάλη) is a residential area and affluent suburb of the Athens agglomeration, Greece. Located in the northern suburbs of the city, it is a green and lush area home to many of the country's most powerful business and political families. Since the 2011 local government reform it is part of the municipality of Kifisia, as a municipal unit.

== Etymology ==
Ekali was an ancient municipality of Athens and belonged to the Leontida tribe. Its inhabitants were named Ekalios. According to tradition, the name is associated with the name of a woman named Ekali. As Plutarch says, as Theseus went to Marathon to catch the famous bull that had caused great damage to the area, the weather conditions were unfavorable. The Athenian king sought refuge in the hut of an old woman, called Ekali. The old woman promised Theseus that she would make a sacrifice to Zeus for the success of his mission. When Theseus caught the bull, he returned to the hut, but found the old woman dead. Grateful for her sacrifice, he later created the sanctuary of Ekaliou Dios and named the region Ekali, where he created the homonymous municipality.

== Geography ==
Ekali is situated at the western end of the forested Penteli mountain range. The municipal unit has an area of 4.332 km^{2}. The small river Kifisos forms the western border of the municipal unit. Ekali is situated 4 km (2 mi) northeast of Kifisia, 5 km (3 mi) southwest of Agios Stefanos and 16 km (10 mi) northeast of Athens city centre.

The main thoroughfare is Thiseos Avenue (Greek National Road 83), which connects Ekali with Kifisia and central Athens. The A1 motorway (Athens - Thessaloniki) passes west of Ekali near Thrakomakedones. Ekali is a purely residential area, which means that retail, commercial shops, and professional businesses are not permitted within the community.

== Notable people ==
- Panagiotis Bitros, businessman and owner of Bitros Holdings
- Michalis Chrysafidis, businessman who was murdered along with his family in Ekali
- Kostas Crommydas, actor
- Fostiropoulos family, shipowners
- Menios Fourthiotis, TV personality
- Adonis Georgiadis, Greek politician, Minister for Health (Cabinet of Kyriakos Mitsotakis 2023-)
- Dimitris Giannakopoulos, owner of Vianex S.A. and Panathinaikos B.C.
- Nikos Hadjinikolaou, journalist and publisher
- Liana Kanelli, member of the Communist Party of Greece and journalist
- Marianna Latsis, socialite, daughter of billionaire Yiannis Latsis
- Stefanos Manos, politician
- Andreas Papandreou, former Prime Minister
- Dimitra Liani, former flight attendant and socialite, known for being the third wife and widow of Andreas Papandreou
- Giannis Poulopoulos, singer
- Giannis Spyropoulos, Greek painter; since 1990, his residence has been home to Spyropoulos Foundation
- George Tragkas, journalist and entrepreneur
- Vardis Vardinogiannis, entrepreneur, major shareholder at Motor Oil
- Andreas Vgenopoulos (businessman), financier, major shareholder at Marfin Investment Group
- Anna Vissi, best-selling singer and artist

== Sites of interest ==
- Giannis Spyropoulos Museum
- Agia Marina Church

== See also ==
- List of municipalities of Attica
