= Pefki =

Pefki Πεύκη
- Municipal unit
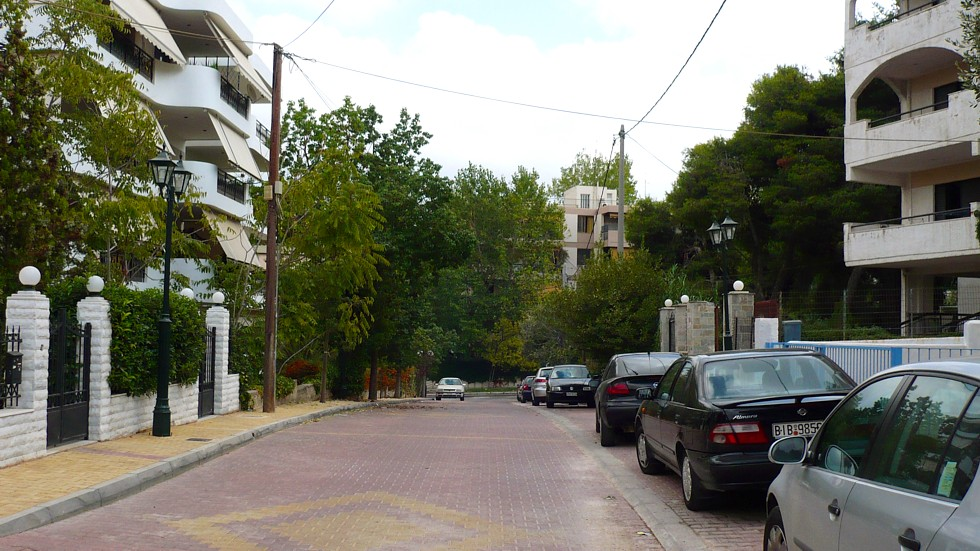

- Location within North Athens regional unit

- Location within Greece
- Coordinates: 38°4′N 23°48′E
- Country: Greece
- Administrative region: Attica
- Regional unit: North Athens
- Municipality: Lykovrysi-Pefki

Area
  - Municipal unit: 2.176 km^{2} (0.840 sq mi)
- Elevation: 260 m (850 ft)

Population (2021)
  - Municipal unit: 21,293
  - Municipal unit density: 9,785/km^{2} (25,340/sq mi)
- Time zone: UTC+2 (EET)
  - Summer (DST): UTC+3 (EEST)
- Postal code: 151 xx
- Area code: 210
- Vehicle registration: Z
- Website: www.dimospefkis.gr

Pefki (Greek: Πεύκη, pronounced [ˈpefci], meaning "pine", before 1959: Μαγκουφάνα Magkoufana [maɡuˈfana]) is a town and a suburb in the northeastern part of the Athens agglomeration, Greece. Since the 2011 local government reform, it is part of the municipality Lykovrysi-Pefki, of which it is the seat and a municipal unit and is part of North Athens regional unit. According to the 2021 population census, Pefki has 21,293 residents.

== Geography ==
Pefki is situated 10 kilometres (6 miles) northeast of Athens city centre. The municipal unit has an area of 2.176 km^{2}. The built-up area of Pefki is continuous with those of the neighbouring suburbs Irakleio, Lykovrysi, Kifisia and Marousi. Pefki consists of two areas: Ano Pefki and Kato Pefki. Pefki is served by Athens Metro Line 1, with the relevant station called "KAT", named after the KAT Hospital that is nearby, and by several bus routes. The nearest motorway is the A6, south of Pefki.

== Historical population ==
Year	Population
1981	10,863
1991	17,987
2001	19,887
2011	21,353
2021	21,293

== Education ==
The Japanese Community School of Athens was previously located in Ano Pefki. There are also 4 public elementary schools 2 middle schoolsand 2 high schools. Further more there is a school for people with hearing pronlems.

== Twin towns ==
Pefki is twinned with:

- Cori, Lazio, Italy
- Krnov, Czech Republic
- Strovolos, Cyprus

== Gallery ==
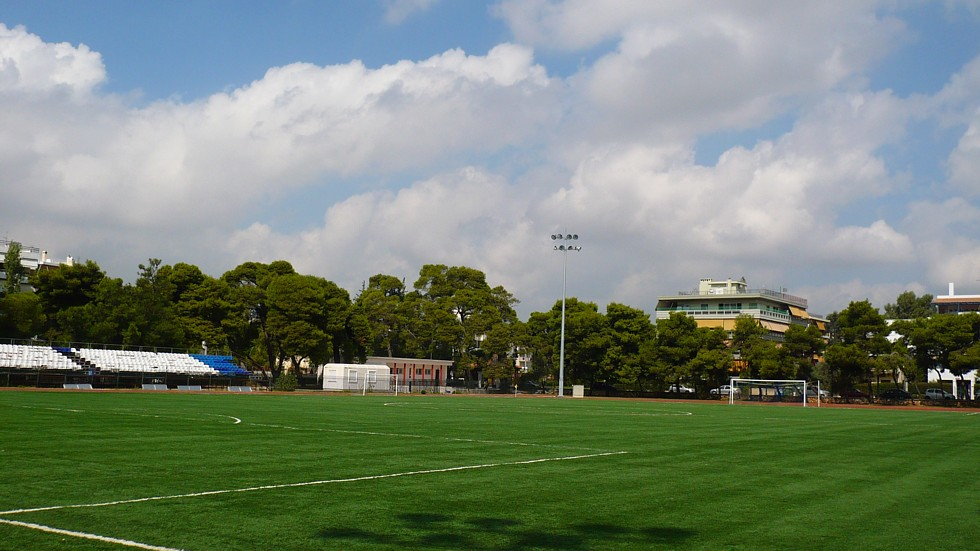
Municipal Stadium of Pefki

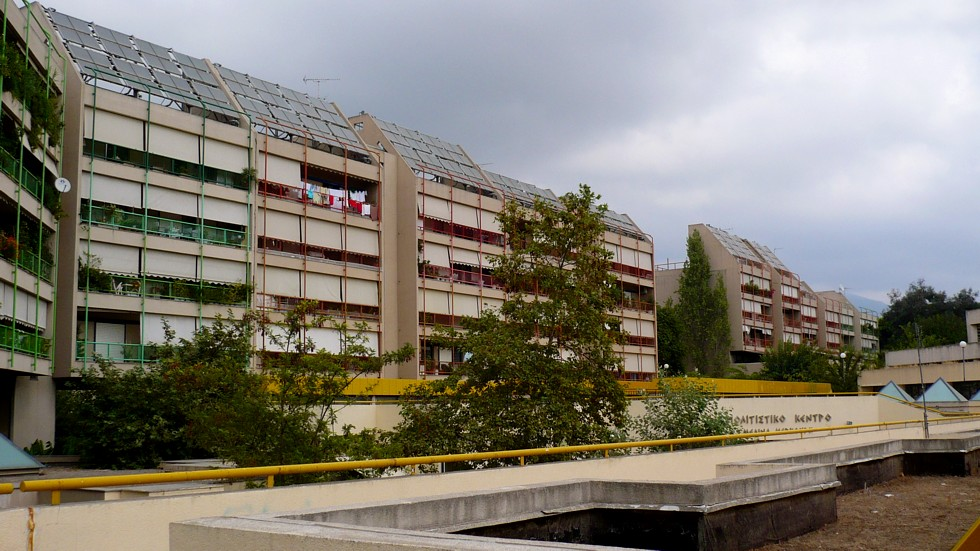
Village of the Sun at Ano Pefki

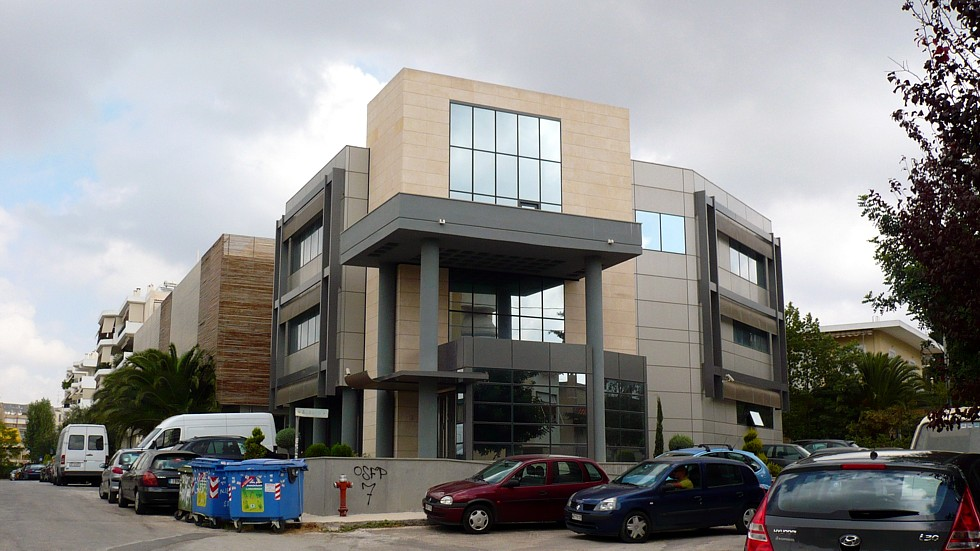
Pefki Architecture

== See also ==
- List of municipalities of Attica
