= Irakleio, Attica =

Irakleio Attica Ηράκλειο Αττικής
- Municipality
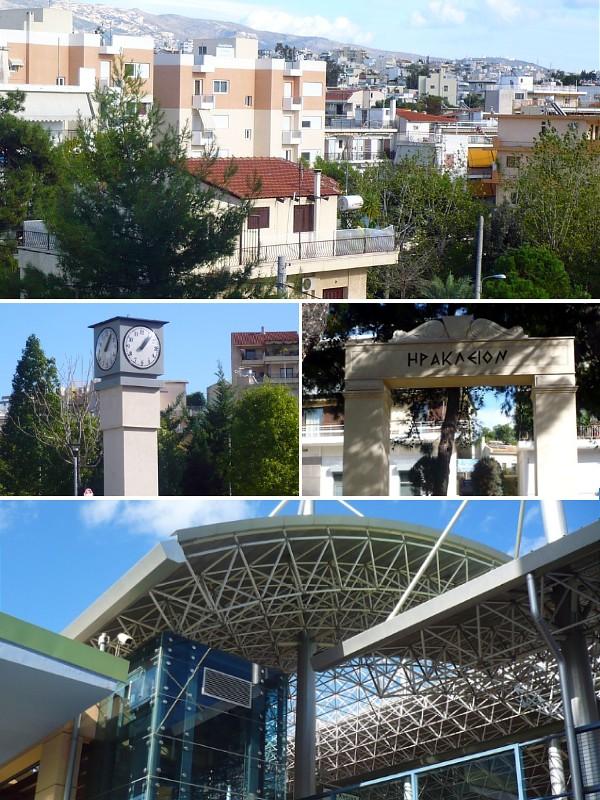

- Seal

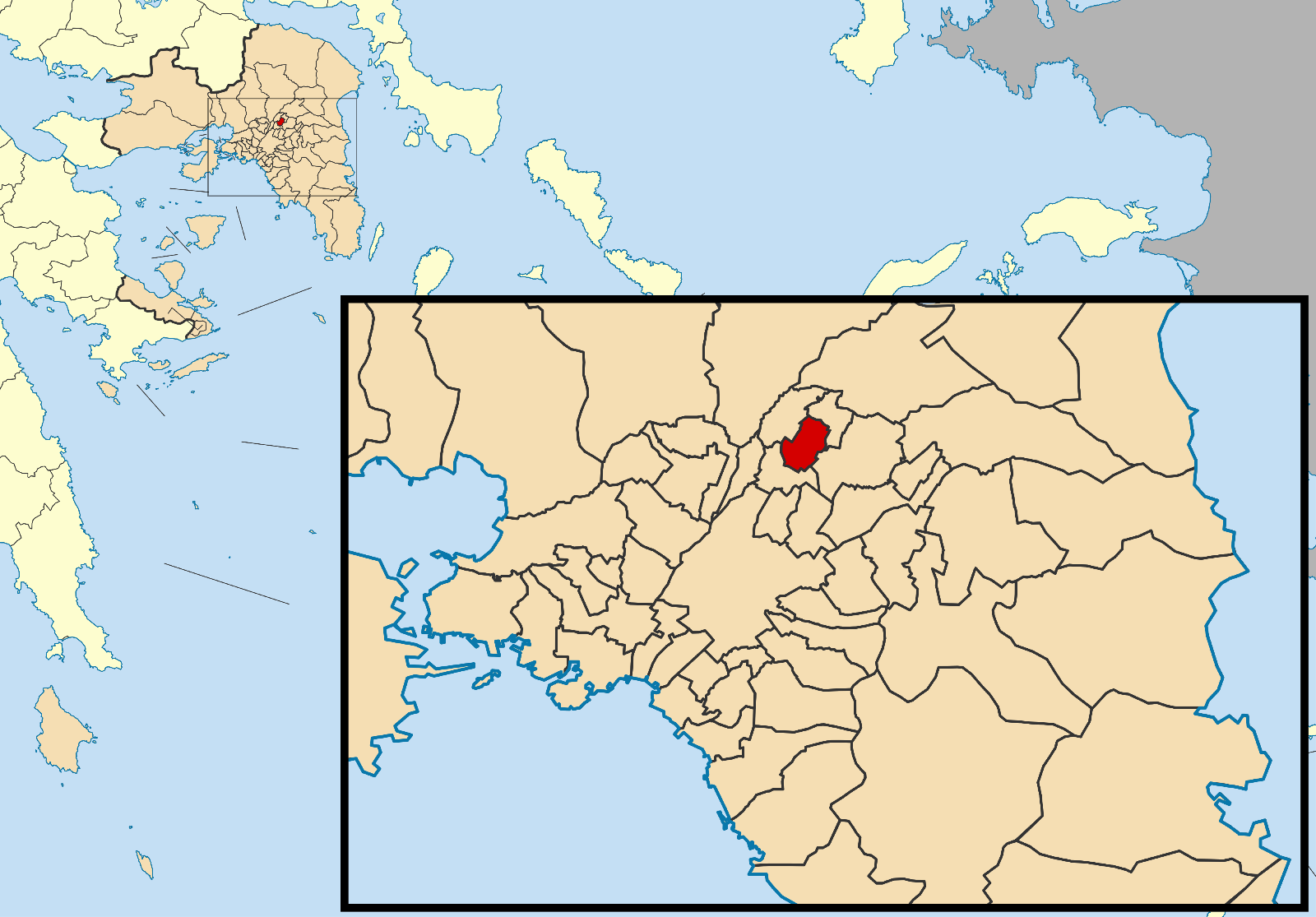

- Location within Greece
- Coordinates: 38°3′N 23°46′E
- Country: Greece
- Administrative region: Attica
- Regional unit: North Athens

Government
  - Mayor: Nikolaos Bampalos (since 2014)

Area
  - Municipality: 4.638 km^{2} (1.791 sq mi)
- Elevation: 150 m (490 ft)

Population (2021)
  - Municipality: 50,494
  - Density: 10,890/km^{2} (28,200/sq mi)
- Time zone: UTC+2 (EET)
  - Summer (DST): UTC+3 (EEST)
- Postal code: 141 xx
- Area code: 210
- Vehicle registration: Z
- Website: www.iraklio.gr

Irakleio, Attica (Greek: Ηράκλειο Αττικής) is a suburb in the northeastern part of the Athens agglomeration, Greece, and a municipality of the Attica region.

== Geography ==
Irakleio is located about 8 km northeast of Athens city centre. The municipality has an area of 4.638 km^{2}. Its built-up area is continuous with those of the neighbouring suburbs Kalogreza, Nea Ionia, Metamorfosi, Lykovrysi, Pefki and Marousi. Irakleio is subdivided into several quarters, including Palaio Irakleio, Neo Irakleio, Ano Irakleio and Prasinos Lofos. The main thoroughfare is Irakleiou Avenue, which connects it with central Athens. The A6 motorway, part of the Attiki Odos ring road, passes through Irakleio. Irakleio is served by a metro station (Irakleio metro station) and by a commuter railway station (Irakleio railway station).

== History ==
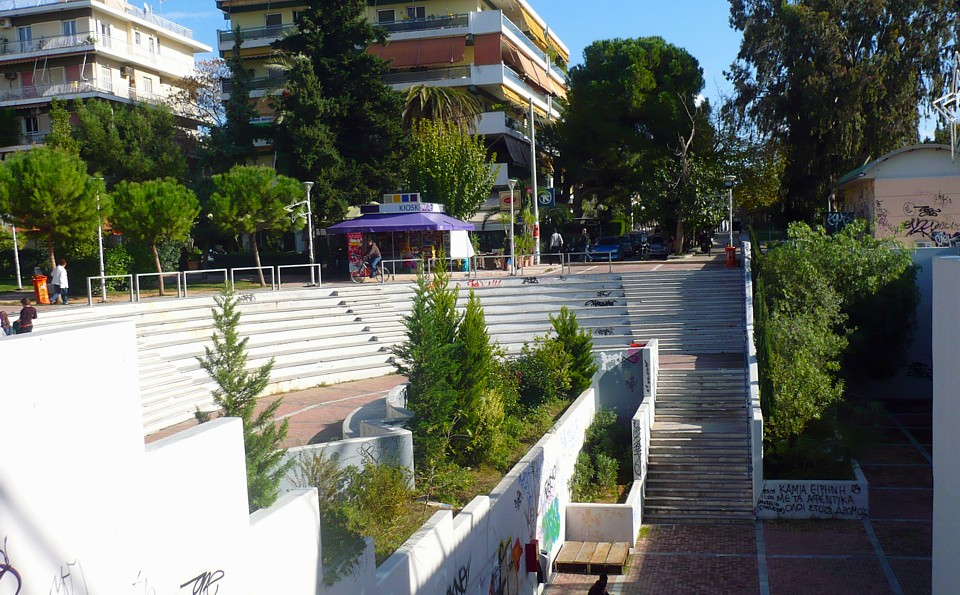
Irakleio square

Irakleio was named after a sanctuary of Heracles that was located in the area in classical antiquity. Before the Greek War of Independence the village was known as Arakli.

Irakleio was refounded as a military colony for the Bavarian Auxiliary Corps by King Otto. Due to the divide between the Catholic Bavarians and the Orthodox Greeks, the local Catholic pastor had to function as match-maker, bringing in a boatload of Catholic girls from Syros to secure the colony's continued existence. The colony nevertheless quickly assimilated into Greek society, so that by the 1860s, German was almost no longer known. During World War II, Heinrich Himmler, who learned of the German origin of many Irakleiotes, came in person to the area and took measures to ensure their comfort amidst the Great Famine. About a hundred Irakleiotes were even persuaded to move to Germany as Volksdeutsche and join the German war effort, but once in Bavaria they found a hostile welcome; and when they returned home in 1945, they found their properties confiscated by the Greek government.

Irakleio was part of the municipality of Athens until 1925, when it became a separate community, elevated to municipality in 1948. The earthquake of September 7, 1999, affected the area but caused minor damages.

Princess Alice of Battenberg (1885–1969), founded the Orthodox religious order of Martha and Mary here after World War II.

== Historical population ==
Year	Population
1981	37,833
1991	42,905
2001	45,926
2011	49,642
2021	50,494

== See also ==
- List of municipalities of Attica
