= Lykovrysi-Pefki =

Lykovrysi-Pefki Λυκόβρυση-Πεύκη
- Municipality
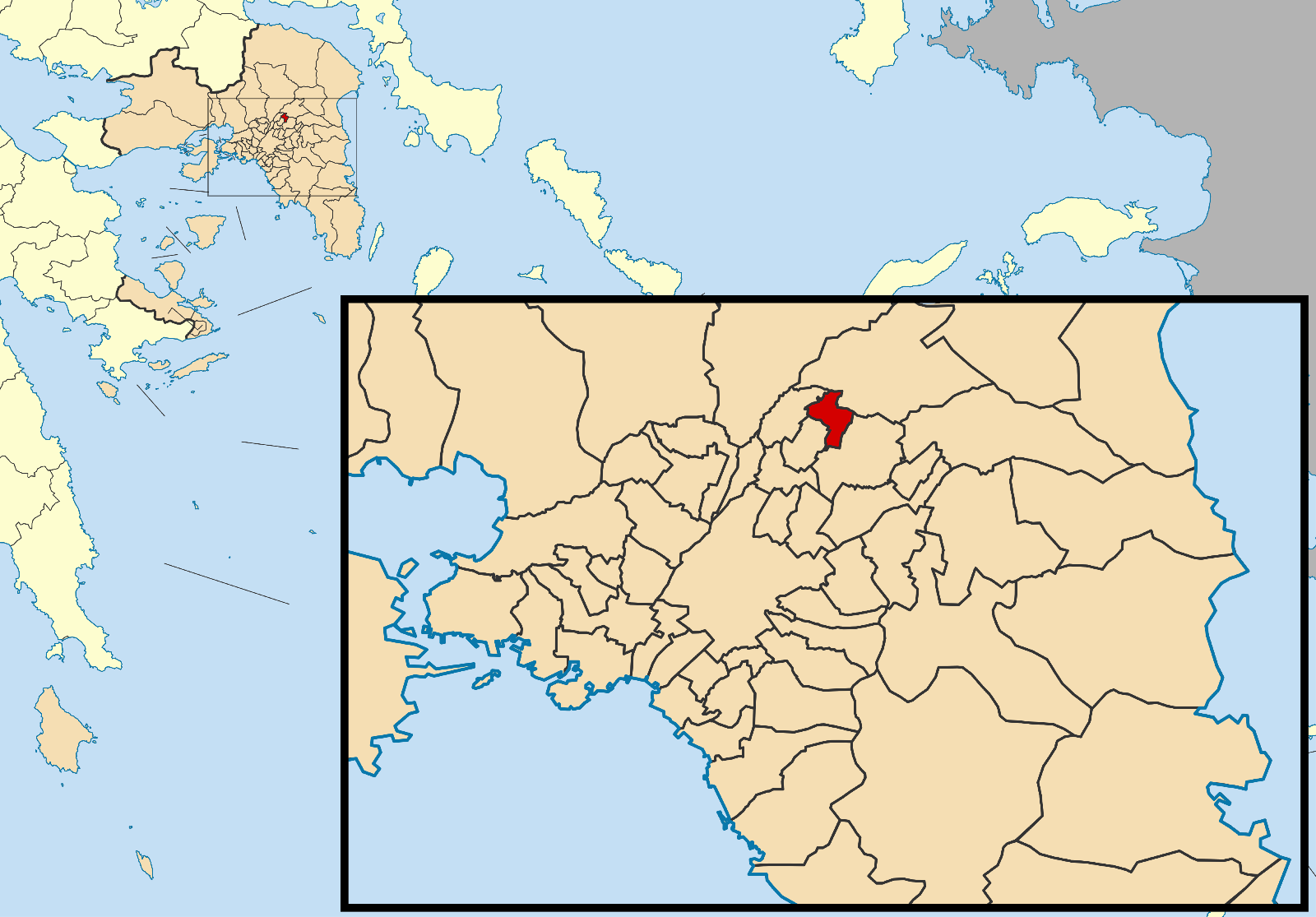

- Location within Greece
- Coordinates: 38°04′N 23°48′E
- Country: Greece
- Administrative region: Attica
- Regional unit: North Athens
- Seat: Pefki

Government
  - Mayor: Marios Georgios Psychalis (since 2023)

Area
  - Municipality: 4.126 km^{2} (1.593 sq mi)

Population (2021)
  - Municipality: 30,998
  - Density: 7,513/km^{2} (19,460/sq mi)
- Time zone: UTC+2 (EET)
  - Summer (DST): UTC+3 (EEST)

Lykovrysi-Pefki (Greek: Λυκόβρυση-Πεύκη) is a municipality in the North Athens regional unit, Attica, Greece. The seat of the municipality is the town of Pefki.

== Municipality ==
The municipality Lykovrysi-Pefki was formed at the 2011 local government reform by the merger of the following 2 former municipalities, that became municipal units:

- Lykovrysi
- Pefki

The municipality has an area of 4.126 km^{2}.
