= Mount Pentelicus =

Mountain range northeast of Athens, Greece

- Mount Pentelikon; Πεντέλη, Πεντελικόν, Πεντελικό Όρος
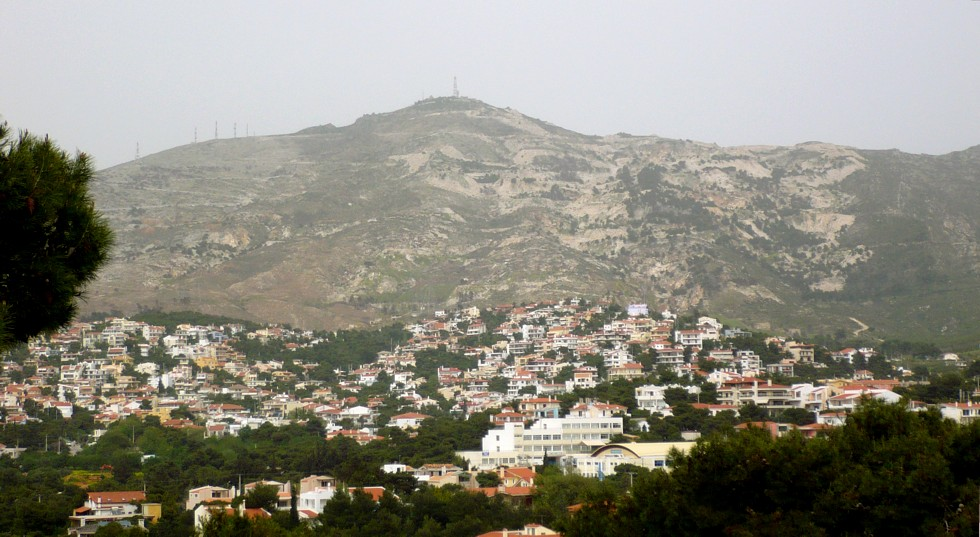

Highest point
- Elevation: 1,109 m (3,638 ft)
- Coordinates: 38°4′51″N 23°53′59″E

Geography
- Location within Greece
- Location: Penteli, Attica, Greece

Mount Pentelicus or Pentelikon (Greek: Πεντέλη, Πεντελικόν or Πεντελικό Όρος) is a mountain in Attica, Greece, situated northeast of Athens and southwest of Marathon. Its highest point is the peak Pyrgari, with an elevation of 1,109 m. The mountain is covered in large part with forest (about 60 or 70%), and can be seen from most of the Attica basin (including northern and southern Athens) and mount Parnitha, as well as far as Elefsina and the east coast of Attica. Human habitation, especially houses, surrounds the mountain, with the districts of Vrilissia, Penteli, Ekali, Dionysos, and the north part of Gerakas being on its foothills. Marble from Mount Pentelicus is of exceptionally high quality and was used to construct much of the Athenian Acropolis. Later, Pentelic marble was exported to Rome, where it was used in construction and in sculptures.

In antiquity, it was also called Brilēssos or Brilēttos (Ancient Greek: Βριλησσός, Βριληττός), which is the origin of the name of the nearby suburb of Vrilissia.

== Pentelic marble ==
Mount Pentelicus has been famous for its marble since antiquity. Pentelic marble was used for the construction of buildings in ancient Athens, particularly the Acropolis. The ancient quarry is protected by law, and used exclusively to obtain material for the Acropolis Restoration Project. The roadway used to transport marble blocks from the quarry to the Acropolis in antiquity is a continual downhill, and follows the natural lay of the land. It has been researched and fully documented by the chief Acropolis restoration architect, Professor Manolis Korres, in his award-winning book From Pentelicon to the Parthenon. A monastery is also located in the middle of the mountain, north-east of the city center.

Pentelic marble is white with a uniform, faint yellow tint, which makes it shine with a golden hue under sunlight. Pentelic marble is calcitic in composition with quartz as an accessory mineral. It is fine grained with sporadic calcitic fossil clasts. Pentelic marble is divided into 3 units distinguishable by δ^{13}C and δ^{18}O values. δ^{13}C and δ^{18}O values have been used to precisely match marbles from the Acropolis to their source quarries. The Elgin Marbles have been traced to Unit 3 using this method.

== Fires ==
=== 1995 fire ===
A fire in early July 1995 consumed much of the mountain's forest. The blaze lasted approximately five days and reached the Pentelis and Vrilissia neighbourhoods, the northern part of the range, parts of Ekali and Dionysos, and the Anoixi district. It consumed three quarters of the mountain's slopes and was considered one of the worst forest fires in Athens and Greece during the 20th century. Following the fire, housing development expanded into the eastern half of the mountain.

=== 1998-2001 fires ===
A series of fires occurred between 1998 and 2001. Many were arson-related and suspects were arrested. In the area of Drafi, mudslides blocked roads and damaged homes in the years following, due in part to the loss of forest cover.

=== 2007 fire ===
On 30 June 2007, a fire broke out northeast of Vrilissia, burning tens of houses and areas of forest. A larger fire occurred approximately six weeks later, affecting the districts of Penteli, Vrilissia, eastern Nea Erythraia, Ekali, and Dionyssos. The cause was widely attributed to arson; a former firefighter was charged and convicted.

=== July 2022 ===
In July 2022, a wildfire destroyed several hectares of forest on the eastern side of the mountain.

== See also ==
- Aloula
- List of mountains in Greece
