= Cephissus (Athenian plain) =

River in Athens, Greece

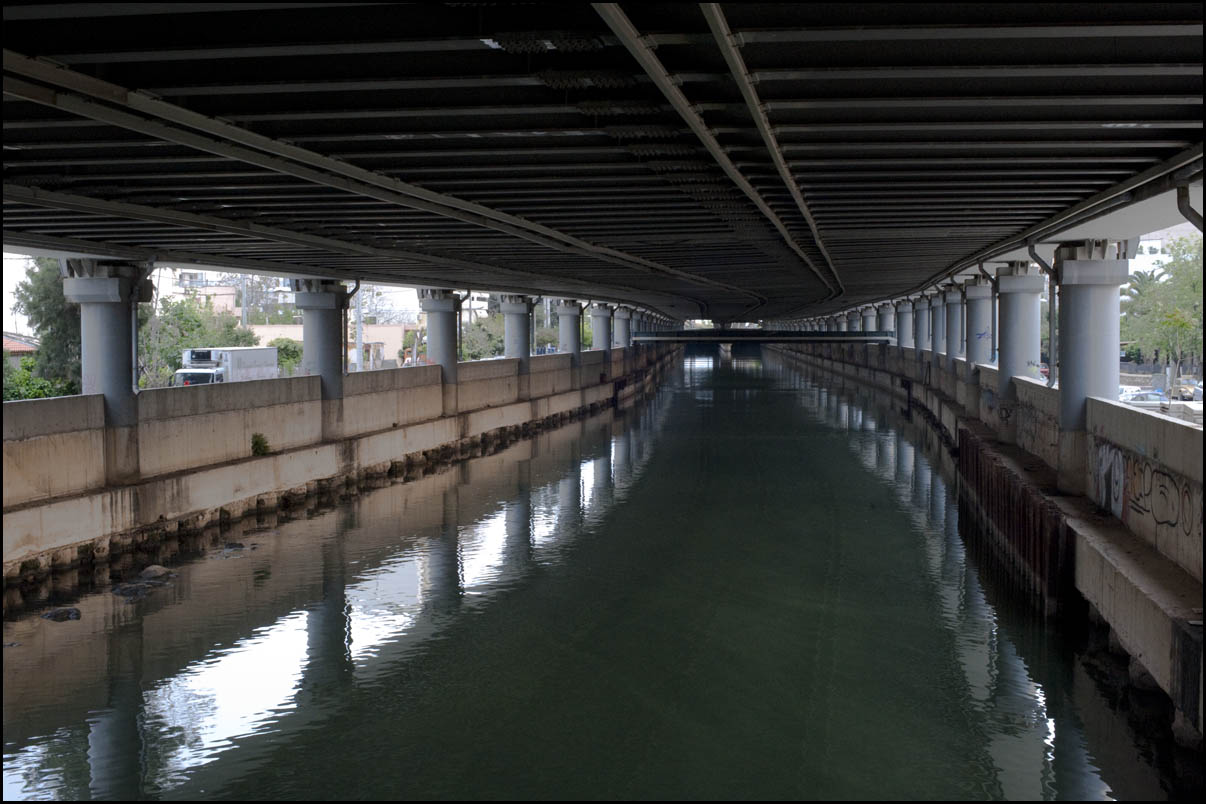
- Cephissus river view under the highway Athens-Lamia
- Native name: Κηφισός (Greek)

Location
- Country: Greece

Physical characteristics
- Source
  - location: Saddle between Parnitha and Penteli mountains
- Mouth
  - location: Phaleron Bay
  - coordinates: 37°56′19″N 23°40′12″E

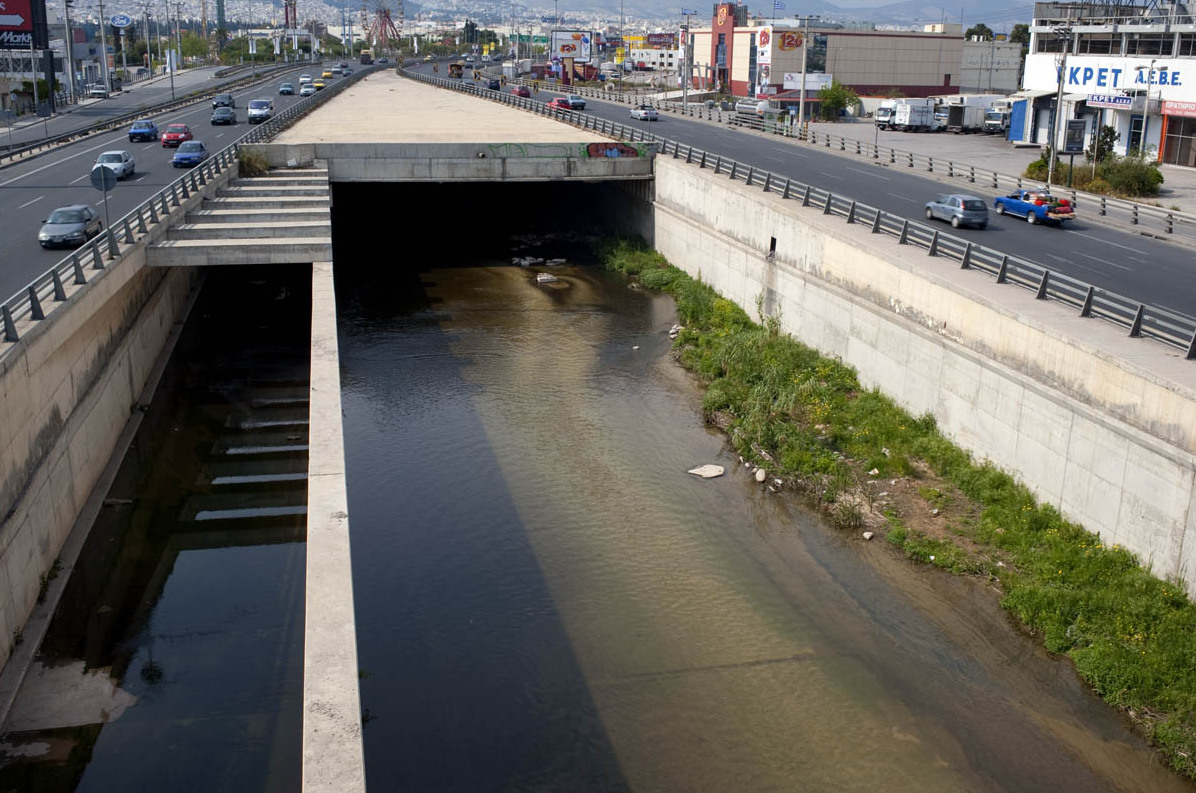
Cephissus river view from above - from a bridge at the highway Athens-Lamia

Cephissus (Ancient Greek: Κήφισσος; Greek: Κηφισός, Kifisos) is a river in the vicinity of Athens, Greece. Together with the neighbouring river Ilisos, it drains a catchment area of 420 km^{2} (160 sq mi).

The source of the river is in the saddle depression between the Parnitha and Penteli mountains. From there it flows generally southwest until it reaches the Phaleron Bay between Neo Faliro and Moschato. Presently the river flows near or under the A1 motorway, linking Athens and Thessaloniki for much of its length. This section of the A1 is named Kifissou Avenue, near which is the Kifissos Bus Terminal.
