= Metamorfosi =

Metamorfosi Μεταμόρφωση
- Municipality
- Seal

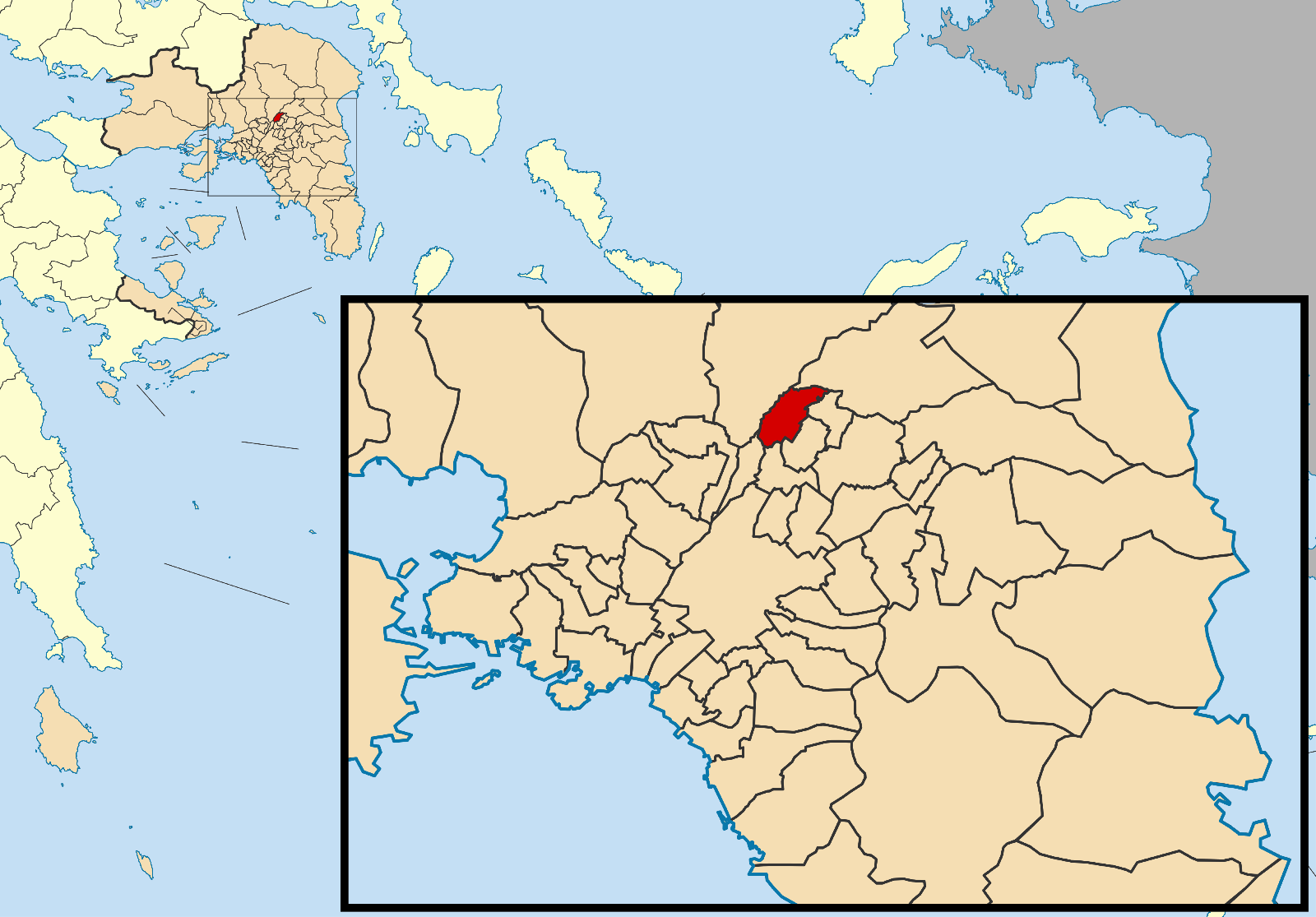

- Location within Greece
- Coordinates: 38°3′N 23°45′E
- Country: Greece
- Administrative region: Attica
- Regional unit: North Athens

Government
  - Mayor: Efstratios Saraoudas (since 2019)

Area
  - Municipality: 5.502 km^{2} (2.124 sq mi)
- Elevation: 170 m (560 ft)

Population (2021)
  - Municipality: 30,174
  - Density: 5,484/km^{2} (14,200/sq mi)
- Time zone: UTC+2 (EET)
  - Summer (DST): UTC+3 (EEST)
- Postal code: 144 5x
- Area code: 210
- Vehicle registration: Z
- Website: metamorfossi.gov.gr

Metamorfosi (Greek: Μεταμόρφωση, before 1957: Κουκουβάουνες, Koukouvaounes) is a suburb in the northern part of the Athens agglomeration, Greece, and a municipality of the Attica region.

== Characteristics ==
Metamorfosi is a quiet area in the northern suburbs of Athens. It is located south of Kifissia and is 12 kilometers from the center of Athens. It covers an area of 5.5 square kilometers. Initially, it was administratively under the Municipality of Athens, until 1933, when the community of Koukouvaounes was established. The community was renamed to Metamorfosi in 1957, to finally be promoted to the Municipality of Metamorfosi in 1972. It has an average altitude of 170 meters.

Metamorfosi was once a known as a place for recreation for Athenians, both because of its climate and because of the many taverns that existed in the area, which was then a village on the rural outskirts of Athens. Today, it has evolved into a complete modern Municipality, with shops, parks and squares, and sports facilities. It recently acquired a second Lyceum.

== Historical population ==
Year	Population
1951	2,807
1961	7,952
1971	16,880
1981	17,840
1991	21,411
2001	27,522
2011	29,891
2021	30,174

== Transportation ==
The area is crossed by various bus lines that connect it with the ISAP lines of Heraklion, Amaroussi, and Kifissia or with the center of Athens, such as the B9. The municipality also operates a Municipal Transport Service.

It is also served by the homonymous station of the Suburban Railway.

== See also ==
- List of municipalities of Attica
