= North Athens =

North Athens Περιφερειακή ενότητα Βορείου Τομέα Αθηνών
- Regional unit
- Municipalities of North Athens

- North Athens within Greece

- Location within Greece
- Coordinates: 38°05′N 23°49′E
- Country: Greece
- Administrative region: Attica
- Seat: Kifisia

Area
  - Total: 140.7 km^{2} (54.3 sq mi)

Population (2021)
  - Total: 601,163
  - Density: 4,273/km^{2} (11,070/sq mi)
- Time zone: UTC+2 (EET)
  - Summer (DST): UTC+3 (EEST)
- Postal code: 14x xx, 15x xx
- Area code: 210

North Athens (Greek: Βόρειος Τομέας Αθηνών) is one of the regional units of Greece. It is part of the region of Attica. The regional unit covers the northeast-central part of the agglomeration of Athens.

== Administration ==
As a part of the 2011 Kallikratis government reform, the regional unit North Athens was created out of part of the former Athens Prefecture. It is subdivided into 12 municipalities. These are (number as in the map in the infobox):

- Agia Paraskevi (2)
- Amarousio (1)
- Chalandri (3)
- Filothei-Psychiko (4)
- Irakleio (5)
- Kifisia (6)
- Lykovrysi-Pefki (7)
- Metamorfosi (8)
- Nea Ionia (9)
- Papagou-Cholargos (10)
- Penteli (11)
- Vrilissia (12)

== See also ==
- List of settlements in Attica
