= Greek Women of Souli Running to Their Death =

Painting by Constance Blanchard

- Femmes grecques de Souli courant à la mort (French)
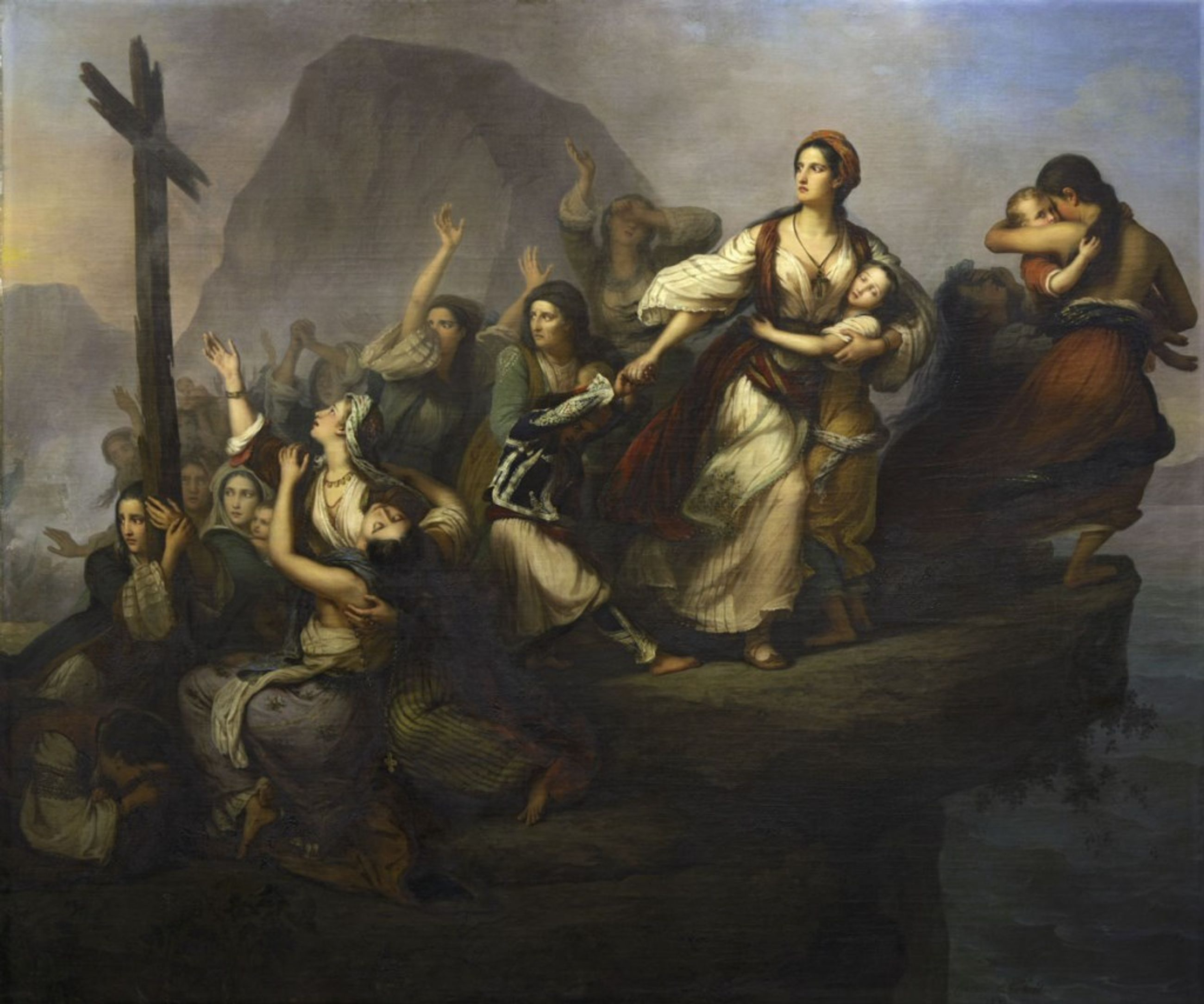
- Artist: Constance Blanchard
- Year: c. 1838
- Medium: Oil on canvas
- Movement: French School
- Subject: Dance of Zalongo
- Dimensions: 343 cm × 400 cm (11.2 ft in × 13.1 in)
- Location: Musée des Augustins, Toulouse, France
- Owner: Musée des Augustins
- Website: Museum website

Greek Women of Souli Running to Their Death is an oil painting created by female French painter Constance Blanchard, exhibited in Paris at the Salon of 1838. The French Ministry of Interior purchased Blanchard's painting on September 20, 1838, at the request of Caze, deputy for Haute-Garonne. The work is on display at the Musée des Augustins in Toulouse, France.

An identical unsigned painting was completed around the same period which is now in Nicosia, Cyprus at the Archbishop Makarios III Foundation Cultural Center.

== History ==
The Dance of Zalongo was a tragic event that occurred as a result of the Souliote War. As legend has it, sixty women and children escaped capture and fled to the mountain of Zalongo where they were trapped. Instead of surrendering which would have led to lifelong enslavement, torture, and rape the women decided to throw their children off a cliff and tragically followed them falling to their death on the rocks while singing and dancing. Countless European and American articles were written about the event and artists began to commemorate the theme. Ary Scheffer painted The Women of Souli in 1827, Filippo Agricola painted Young Albanian being chased by a Turk in 1833, Dance of Zalongo was another work created by Claude Pinet in 1855, Alphonse Marie de Neuville painted Courage des femmes Souliotes around the same period and Theophilos Hatzimihail painted Dance of Zalongo in 1929.

== Artist ==
Constance Blanchard was born in Paris and she was active in the early part of the 19th century between 1820 and 1840. She created a painting entitled Jesus Christ in 1822 but also painted the full-length Portrait of Mademoiselle G (Portrait en Pied de Mme de G.) that same year. Two years later she won second place in an art competition and painted The Virgin Our Lady of Good Help (Une Vierge. Notre Dame de Bon Secours), a full-length Portrait of Madame la Marquise de la V. (Portrait en Pied de Mme la Marquise de la V) and she also painted additional portraits that same year. By 1831, she completed a work entitled Assumption of the Virgin (Une Assomption) and even more portraits. In 1835, she completed another version with the same theme of the Assumption of the Virgin (Une Assomption) and by 1838 she finished the Greek Women of Souli Running to Their Death. King Charles X of France presented one of her paintings with the Savior and the sister's Mary and Martha to the Sisters of the Visitation of the Georgetown Visitation Monastery in Washington, D.C.

== Description ==
The work of art was created using oil paint and canvas and the height of the massive painting is: 343 cm (11.2 ft) and the width is 400 cm (13.1 ft). Delacroix popularized the Greek War for Independence (1821–1829) with a series of paintings and many French painters were eager to continue the theme. The work marks the end of romanticism and the dawn of realism. Women of all ages appear and young children are scattered around the crowd of women. The woman's lavish costumes denote the traditional attire of Northern Greece around that period. The haunted expressions and frightful gazes build the anxiety of that moment. To the far left, behind the cross in the smoke, the silhouette of soldiers appears as they are approaching. The smoke from their fire darkens the sky. The children appear restless and some women embrace their small children clasped to their bosoms. One woman to our left embraces the cross, another woman prays to the cross with her right arm elevated. The female statuesque figures are wearing elaborate jewelry. A young mother wearing a turban, red scarf, and white dress clutches a little girl in a yellow dress to her breast as the young girl's back is turned to the sea. The mother staunchly climbs the cliff and drags a little boy in a white fustanella wearing a blue jacket and pants embroidered with white. He supports himself on his feet and refuses to fall from the cliff into the sea below onto the distant rocky coast.

== Gallery ==
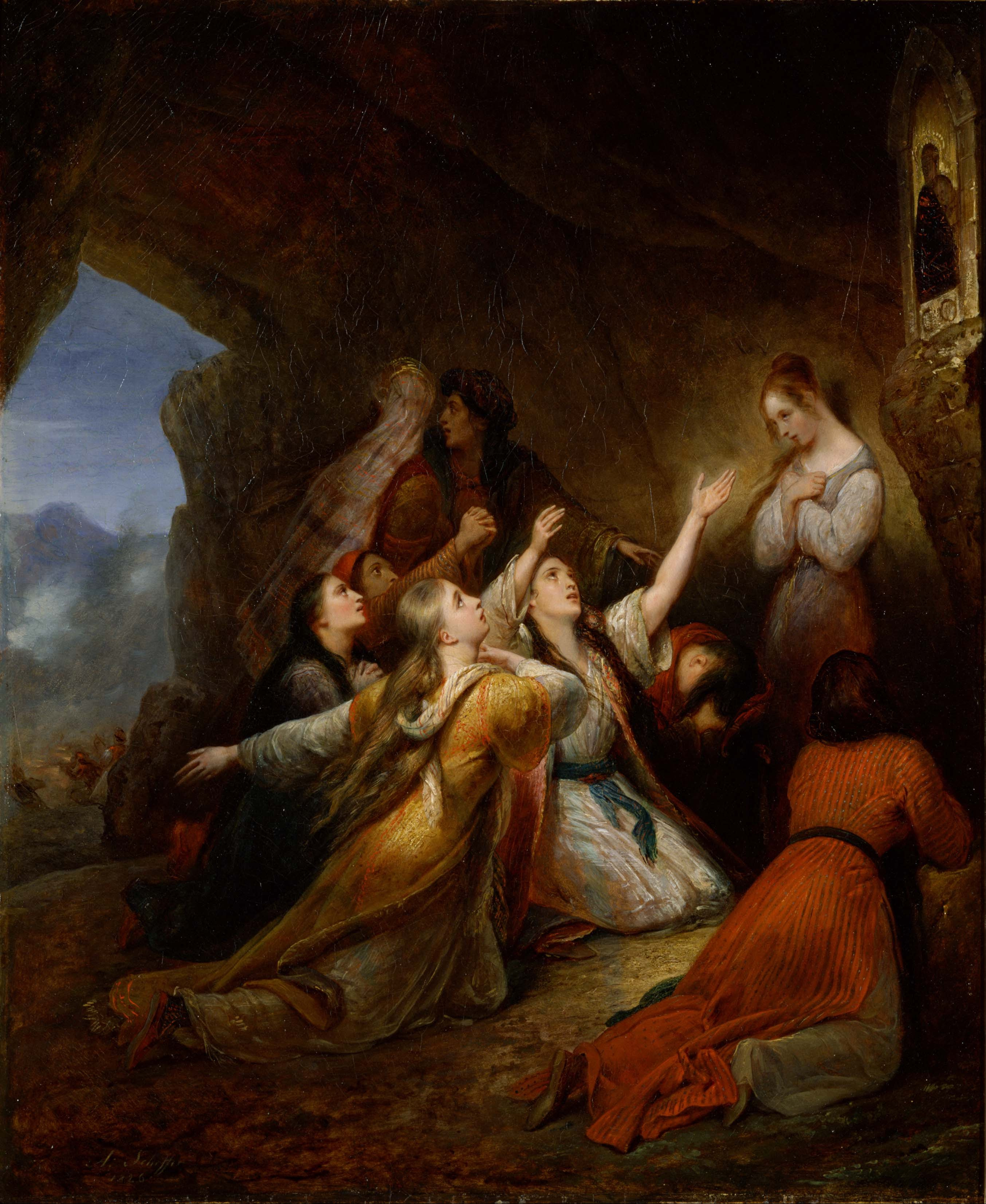
Souli Women with the Virgin Ary Scheffer

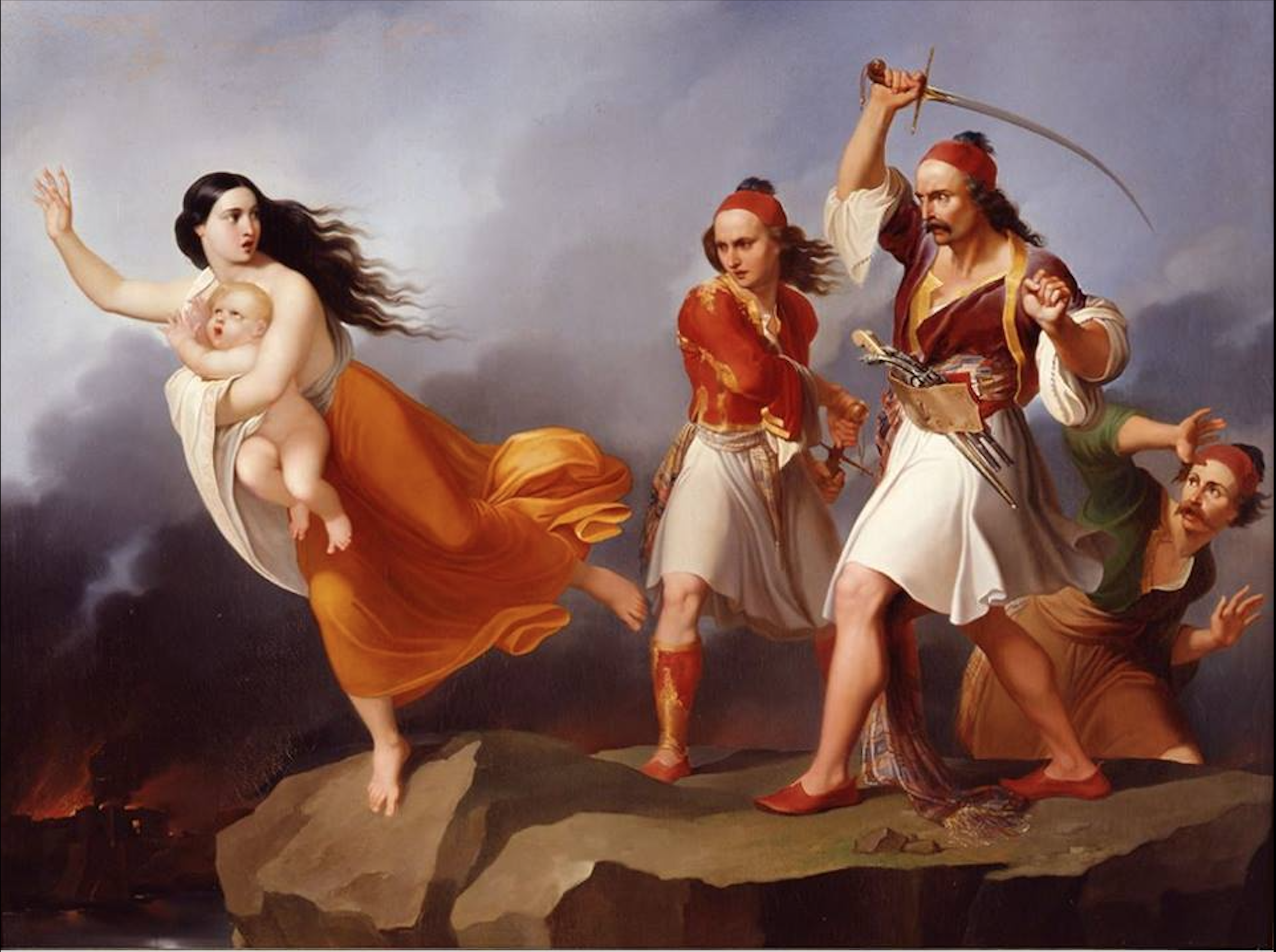
Dance of Zalongo by Filippo Agricola

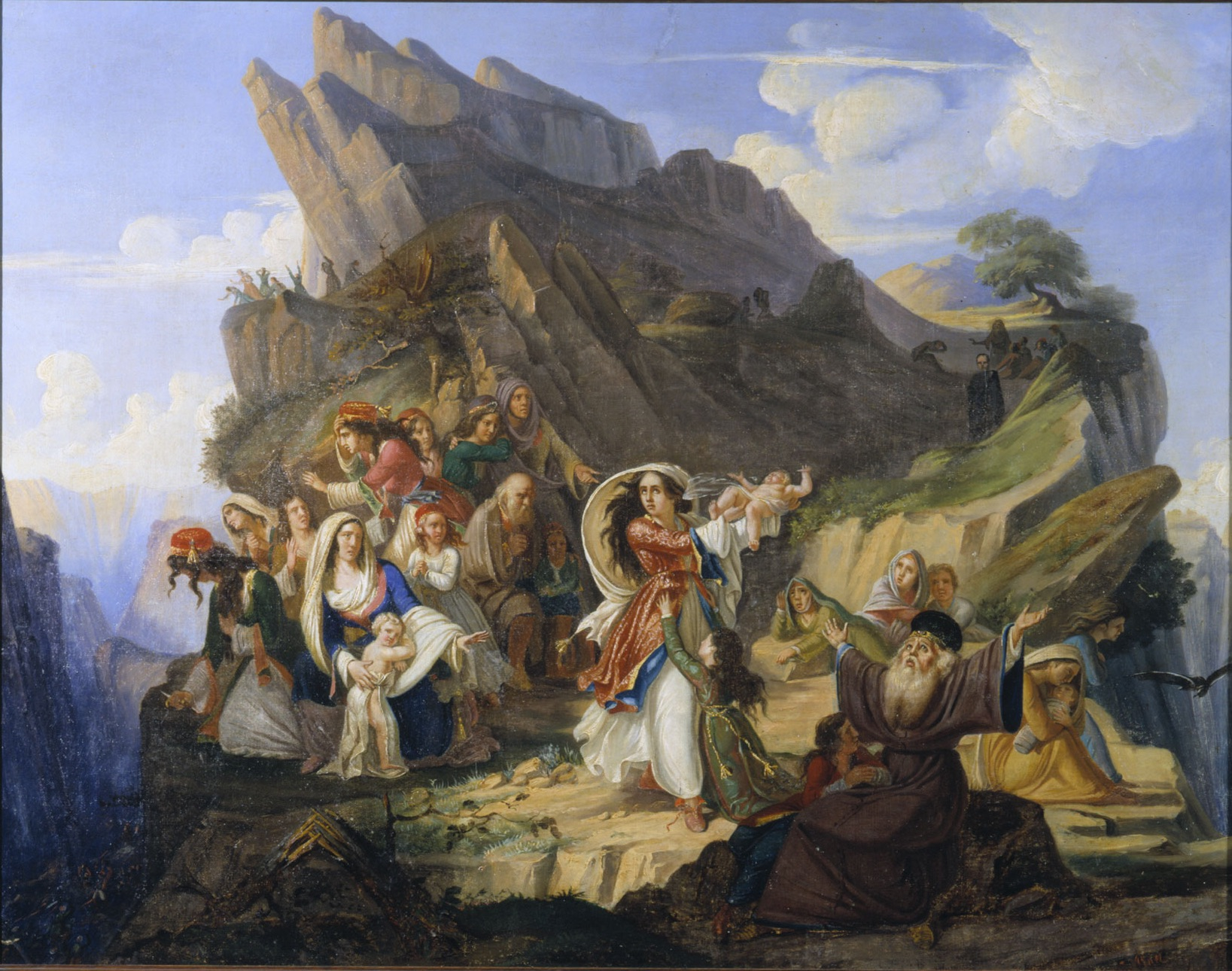
Dance of Zalongo by Claude Pinet

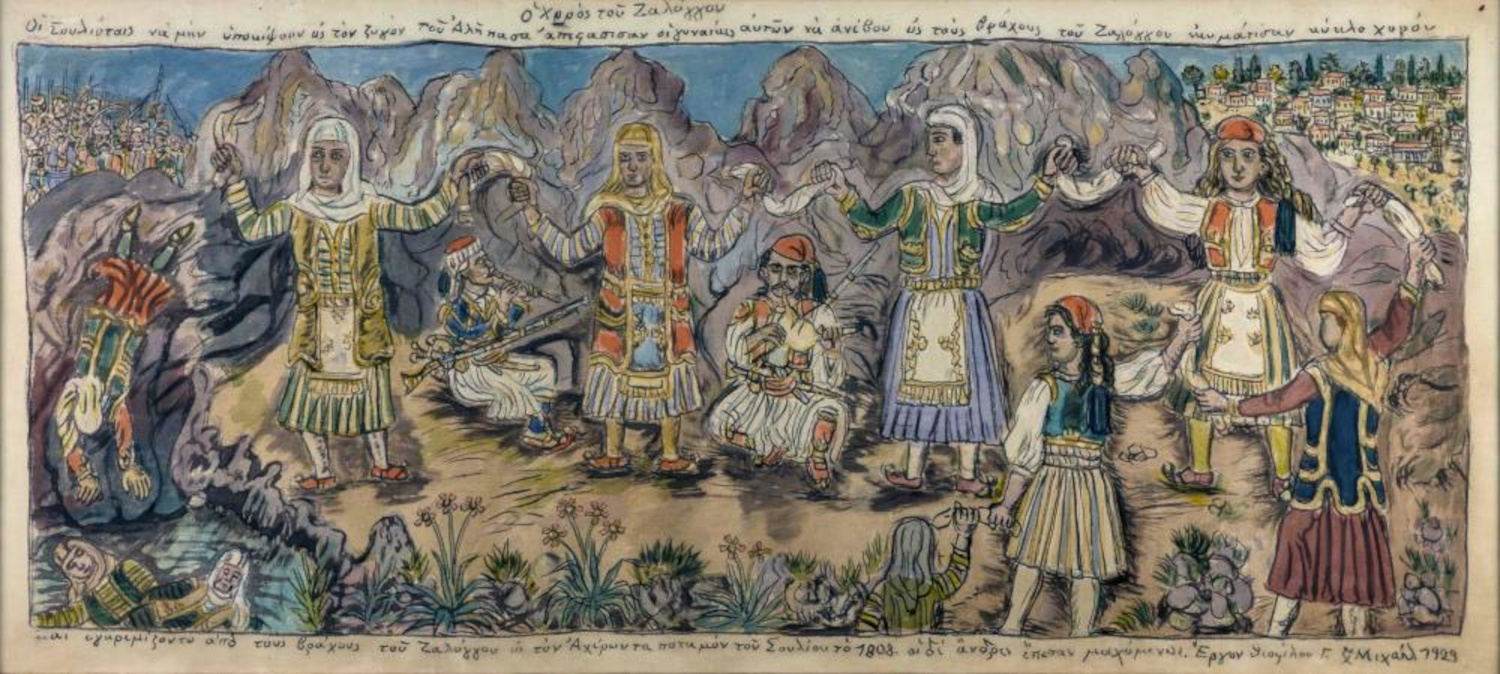
Dance of Zalongo by Theophilos Hatzimihail

== Bibliography ==
- Athanassoglou-Kallmyer, Nina M. (1989). French Images from the Greek War of Independence (1821-1830) Art and Politics Under the Restoration. New Haven, Connecticut: Yale University Press. ISBN 0-300-04532-8.
- Kleiner, Fred S. (2009). Gardner's Art through the Ages: A Concise Global History, Second Edition. Boston, MA: Wadsworth Cengage Learning. ISBN 978-0495503460.
- Alatis, James E., ed. (1990). The Georgetown Journal of Languages & Linguistics. Vol. 1. Washington, DC: Georgetown University. School.
- Walsh, Louise S. (1917). "Convent Inspection Bills". The Maine Catholic Historical Magazine. 7 (4). Waterville, Maine.
- Briant, Jean, ed. (1908). Inventaire Général des Richesses d'art de La France [General Inventory of France's Artistic Riches]. Vol. 8. Paris, France: Plon, Nourrit et Cie.Imprimeurs Editeurs.
- Bénézit, Emmanuel, ed. (1924). "Blanchard (Mlle Constance)". Dictionnaire Critique Et Documentaire Des Peintres, Sculpteurs, Dessinateurs & Graveurs de Tous Les Temps Et de Tous Les Pays: A.C. A-C (in French). Vol. 1. Paris, France: Ernest Grund, Editeur.
- Siret, Adolphe, ed. (1883). "Blanchard (Mlle Constance)". Dictionnaire Historique et Raisonné des Peintres de Toutes les Ècoles Depuis L'origine de la Peinture Jusqu'à nos Jours (in French). Vol. 1. Paris, France: Chez les Principaux Libraires.
- Bellier de La Chavignerie, Émile; Auvray, Louis, eds. (1882). "Blanchard (Mlle Constance)". Dictionnaire Général Des Artistes de l'école Française Depuis l'origine Des Arts du Dessin Jusqu'à nos Jours (in French). Vol. 1. Paris, France: Librairie Renouard Editeur.
