= Monument of Zalongo =

1961 sculpture by George Zongolopoulos

Coordinates: 39.1485°N 20.6843°E

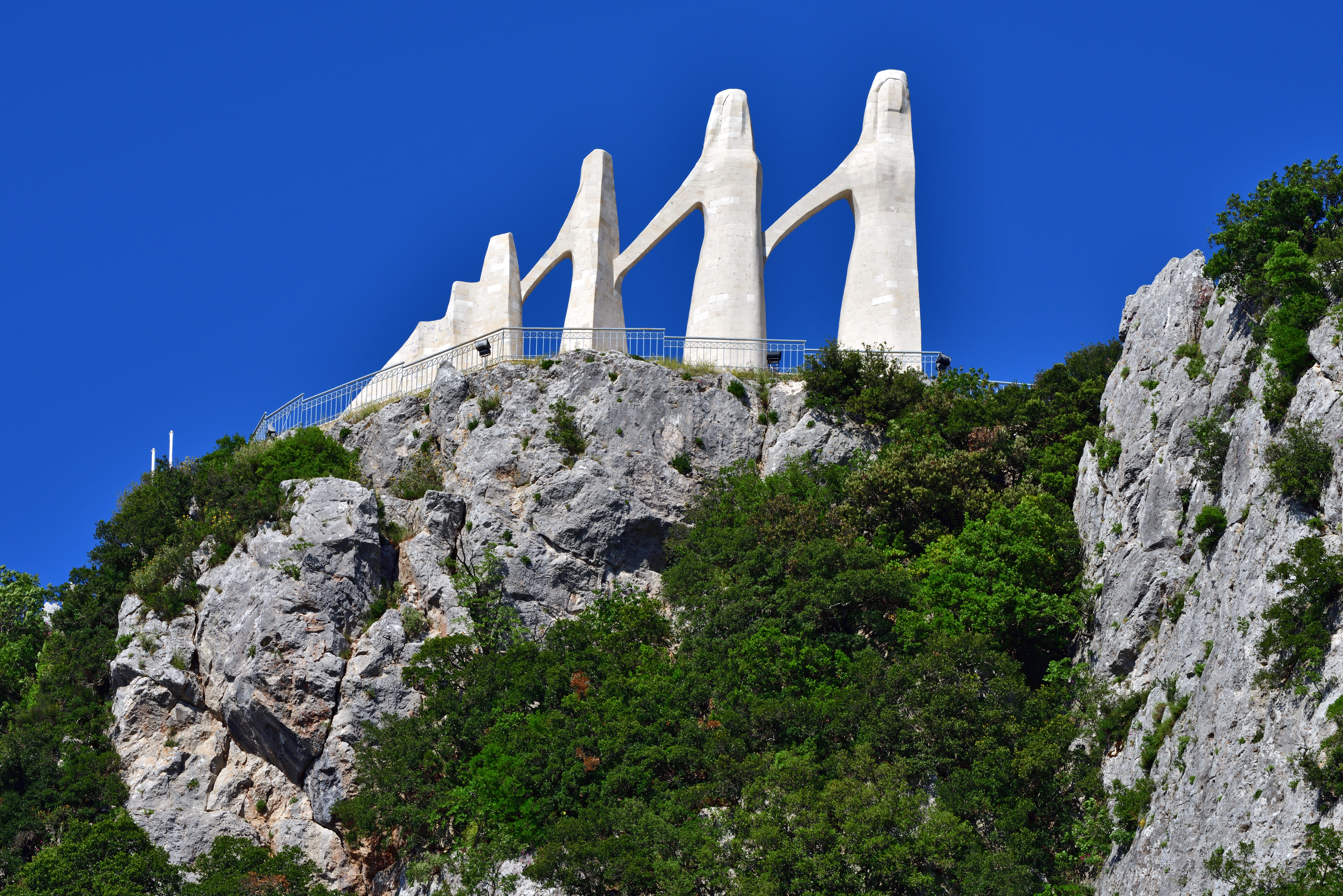
- Monument of Zalongo, on the top of the cliff where the Souliote women threw themselves off in 1803.They died in order to remain free from Ottoman rulers at that time.
- Artist: George Zongolopoulos
- Year: 1961
- Type: concrete and stone
- Location: near Preveza, Greece

The Monument of Zalongo is a 1961 monumental sculpture by George Zongolopoulos, commemorating the Dance of Zalongo, a mass suicide of women and children in 1803. It is located at 700 meters altitude on Mount Zalongo, near Preveza, Greece, from which it is visible. The closest village is Kamarina. One can access the monument from Saint Dimitrios Monastery (590 meters altitude), which leads to the top via a cobbled lane of 410 steps.

The monument depicts six abstract female figures holding hands. It is 18 meters in length, 13 meters high and is made of concrete supported by 4,300 whitish limestone blocks (40x30x25 cm each). The construction took six years, from 1954 to 1960, and was financed by two Pan-Hellenic student fundraising drives.

== History ==
June 10, 1950: At a teachers' meeting in the district of Preveza, the principal of Kamarina's Primary School, George Sakkas, suggested the construction of a monument to honor the heroic women of Souli.

September 1, 1950: The governor of Preveza, Spiros Kafetzis, invited all the mayors to raise money in order to construct the monument of Zalongo. In November, Giorgos Chronis, the district inspector of primary schools, decided to conduct fundraising through the schools. October 29, 1950: A symbolic laying of the foundation for the monument of Zalongo was held. The political, military and religious leaders of the region attended the ceremony along with many citizens.

May, 1953: With 500,000 drachmas raised for the monument, the Ministry of Education announced a National contest for sculptors and architects. The examination board consisted of the General Commander of Ipiros, K. Tsitsaras; the governor of Preveza, Sp. Kafetsis; the Director of the Ministry of Education, G. Pantzaris as well as the sculptors M. Tompros and V. Falireas. The board awarded the proposal of sculptor George Zongolopoulos and architect Patroklos Karantinos.

July 1954: Construction of the monument began under the direction of George Zongolopoulos and Patroklos Karantinos, who offered their supervision without pay. The technical part of the monument was assigned to the marble craftsman Eleftherio Giftopoulo. Every spring-summer and until the completion of the project, George Zongolopoulos and his wife, Eleni Paschalidou-Zongolopoulou, traveling by the military vehicles, spent 3-4 months working on the construction. All the materials (sand, gravel, concrete, water, wood, etc.) were transferred by hand until an improvised mechanism was created to lift the materials.

During the monument's construction, Kamarina's citizens as well as military forces provided extremely helpful assistance. June 10, 1961: The monument was completed and the unveiling ceremony took place with political leaders and citizens attending. On the east side of the base of monument there is a marble inscription with the names of the people who contributed to the work: “Sculptor: George Zongolopoulos, Architect: Patroklos Karantinos, Technician: Eleftherios Giftopoulos ”.

Between 2008-2013 the municipality of Preveza in co-operation with the George Zongolopoulos Foundation undertook the restoration and maintenance of the Monument of Zalongo. Every year, 30.000 people visit the monument of Zalongo. Every summer the municipality of Preveza organizes the “Zalongeia”, a feast and celebration in the central square of Kamarina.
