= The Women of Souli =

Painting by Ary Scheffer

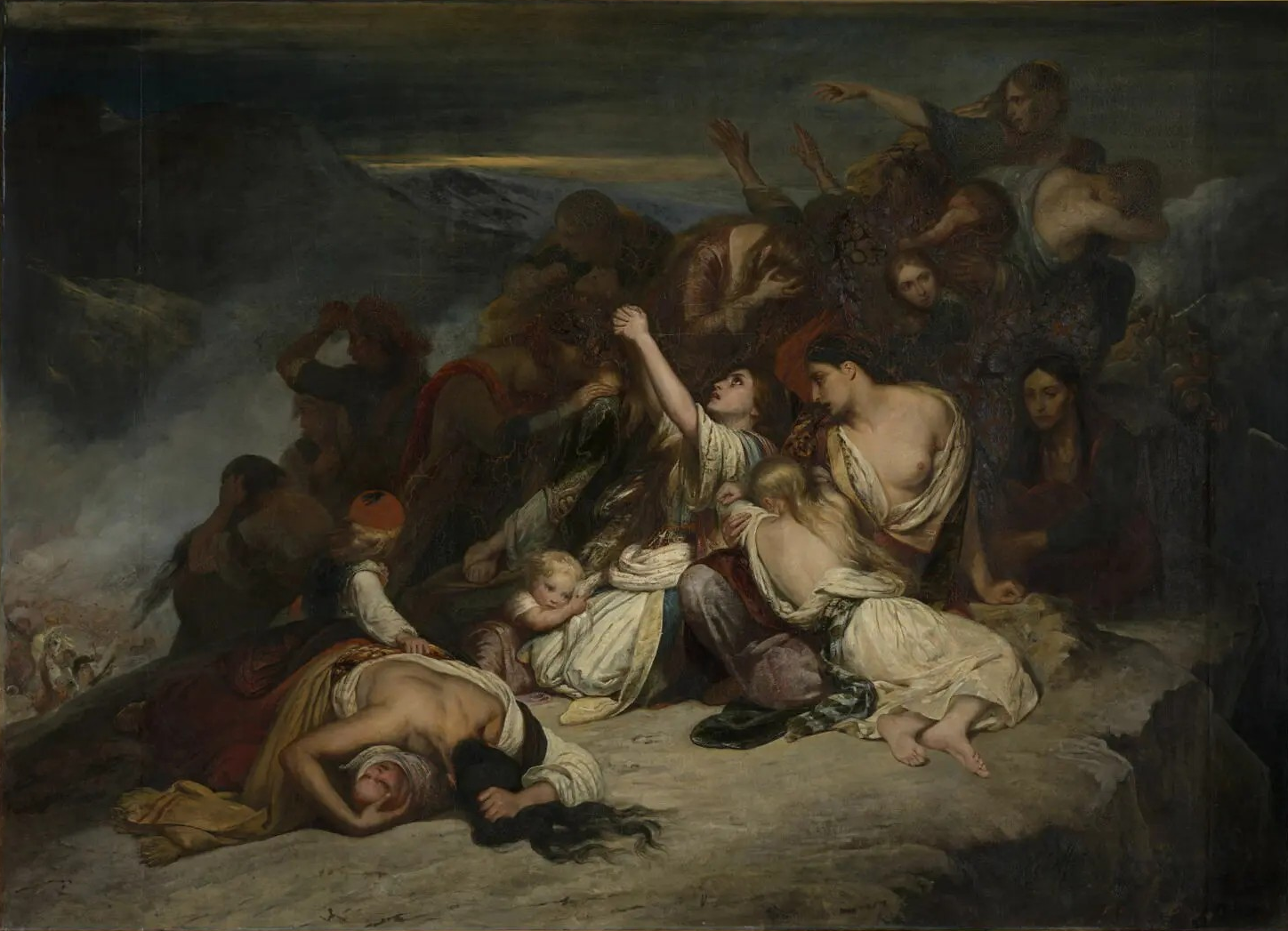
- Artist: Ary Scheffer
- Year: 1827
- Type: Oil on canvas, history painting
- Dimensions: 261.5 cm × 359.5 cm (103.0 in × 141.5 in)
- Location: Louvre, Paris

The Women of Souli (French: Les Femmes souliotes) is an oil on canvas history painting by the Dutch artist Ary Scheffer, from 1823. It is held at the Louvre, in Paris

== History and description ==
It is inspired by the Dance of Zalongo, an incident of the Souliote War of 1803. When the Ottoman-backed Ali Pasha defeated the Souliotes, around sixty woman were trapped at Mount Zalongo. Rather than submit to the enemy which would mean slavery, they flung themselves to their death off the clifftop committing mass suicide. The subject appealed to members of the Romantic movement. Scheffer's painting produced in the context of the Greek War of Independence which involved mass brutality and attracted support from Philhellenes across Europe.

The painting was displayed at the Salon of 1827 held at the Louvre, in Paris. In 1828 it was acquired by the French state for 4,000 francs and hung at the Musée du Luxembourg until 1873. Today it forms part of the collection of the Louvre.

== See also ==
- Greek Women of Souli Running to Their Death, an 1838 painting by Constance Blanchard

== Bibliography ==
- Ewals, Leo. Ary Scheffer 1795-1858. Waanders, 1996.
- Koulouri, Christina. Historical Memory in Greece, 1821–1930: Performing the Past in the Present. Taylor & Francis, 2022.
- Tsangaris, Michael. Communication and Tourism: Reflecting on the Construction of the Tourist Image of Greece. CABI, 2024.
