= Zalongo =

Zalongo Ζάλογγο
- Municipal unit
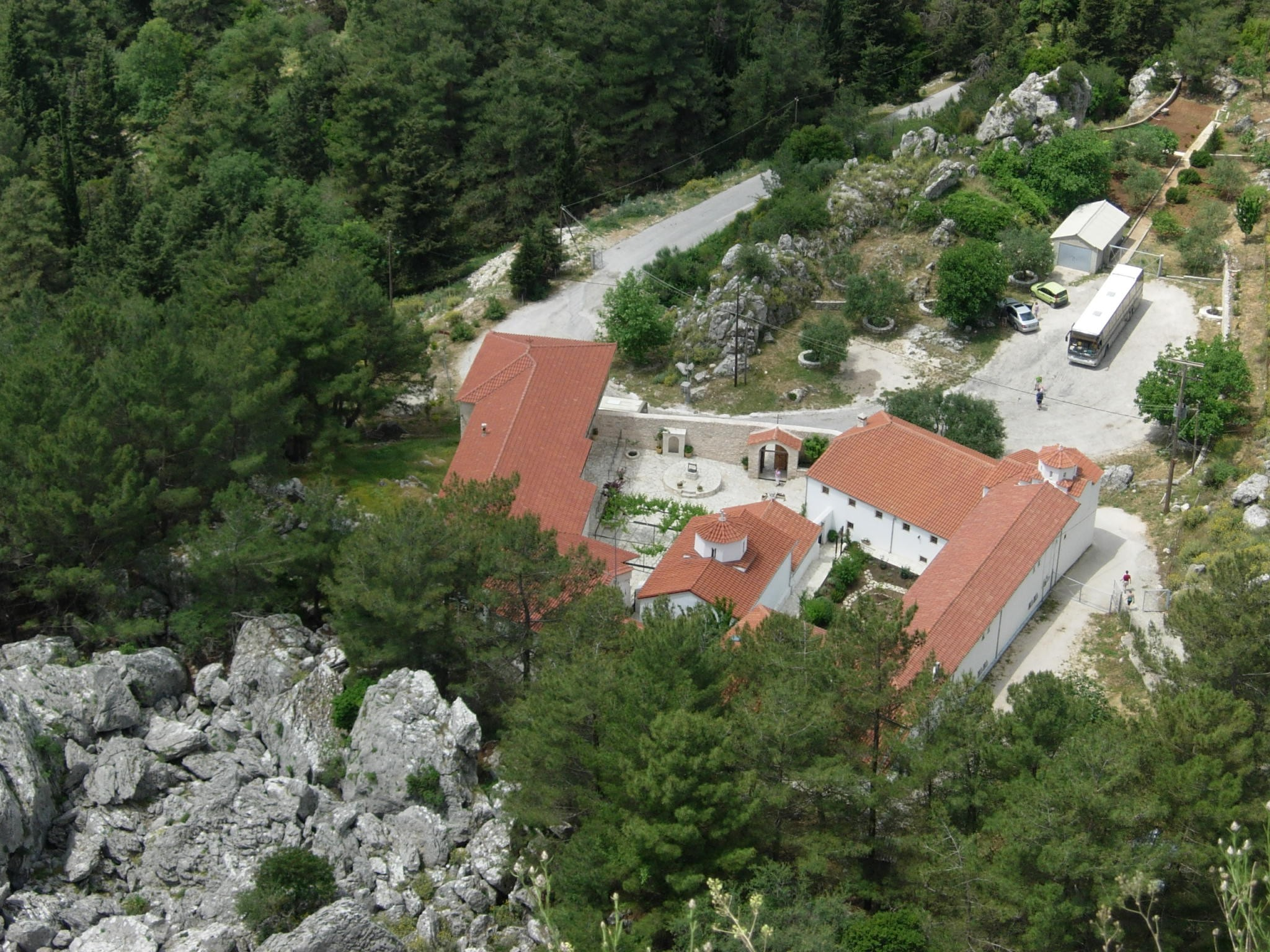
- Monastery of Zalongo.

- Location within the regional unit

- Location within Greece
- Coordinates: 39°08′N 20°40′E
- Country: Greece
- Administrative region: Epirus
- Regional unit: Preveza
- Municipality: Preveza

Area
  - Municipal unit: 137.6 km^{2} (53.1 sq mi)

Population (2021)
  - Municipal unit: 3,986
  - Municipal unit density: 28.97/km^{2} (75.03/sq mi)
- Time zone: UTC+2 (EET)
  - Summer (DST): UTC+3 (EEST)
- Vehicle registration: ΡΖ

Zalongo (Greek: Ζάλογγο) is a former municipality in the Preveza regional unit, Epirus, Greece. Since the 2011 local government reform it is part of the municipality Preveza, of which it is a municipal unit. The municipal unit has an area of 137.631 km^{2}. Population 3,986 (2021). The seat of the municipality was in Kanali. Nearby is the 18th century Zalongo Monastery, immortalized by the defiant mass suicide of a group of Souliot women. The ruins of ancient Cassope are situated near the village Kamarina.
