= Despo Botsi =

Greek Souliot heroine

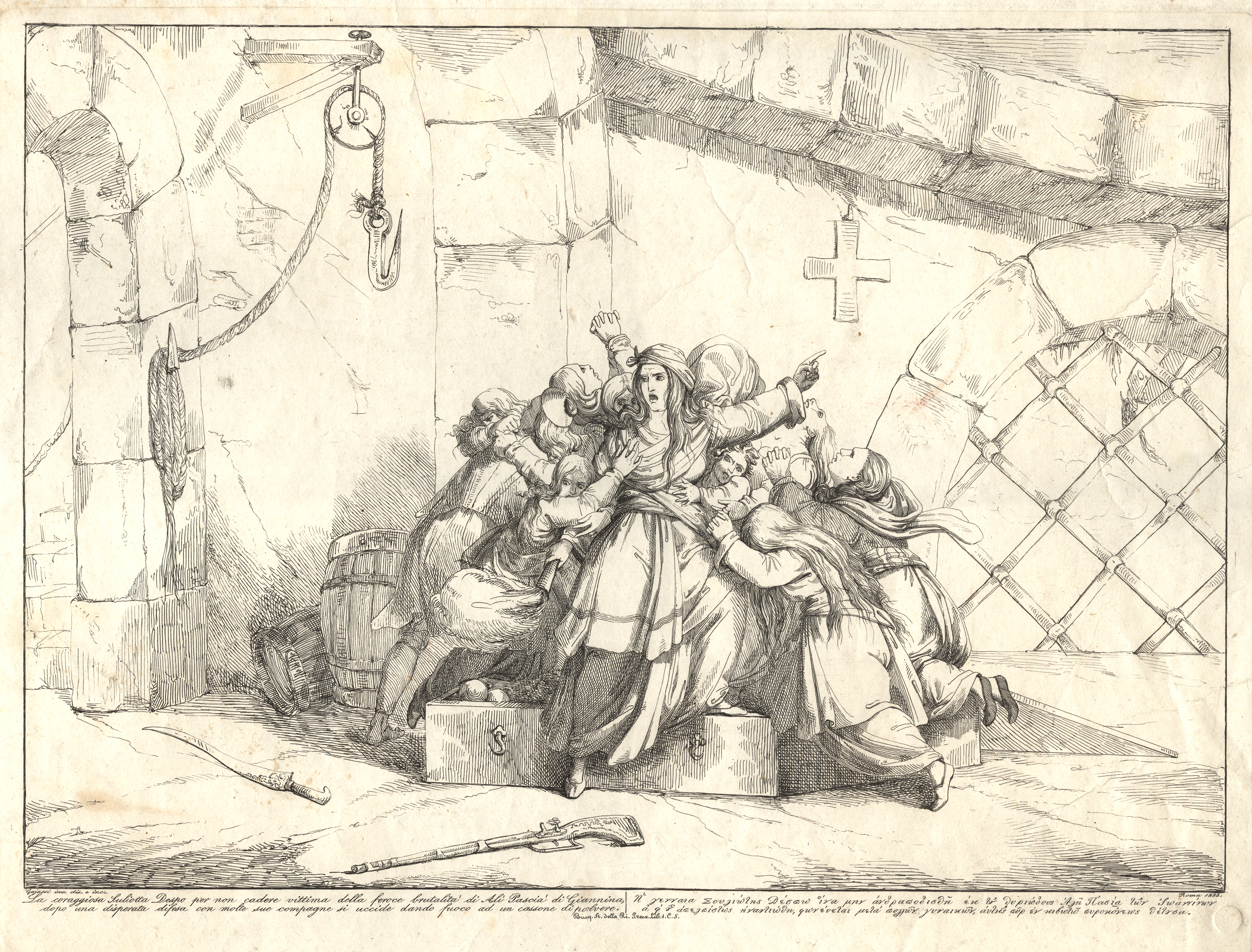
Despo Botsi ready to blow up Dimoula's tower, 1833 engraving

Despoina Botsi (Albanian: Dhespo Boçi; Greek: Δέσποινα Μπότση), commonly known as Despo Botsi, was a Souliot woman who went down in history for her resistance to the troops of Ali Pasha of Ioannina and her heroic death—together with the women and children she had under her protection—in the tower of Dimoulas, in the village of Riniasa (now Riza) of Zalongos, on December 25, 1803.

Despo came from the Souliot Sechos family. Her brothers were Giannakis, Giorgos and Dimitrios Sechos or Karametsis. She was the wife of the Souliot chieftain Giorgakis Botsis. The extended family of Giorgakis Botsis had settled in the coastal village of Riniasa, tributary to Ali Pasha, in 1802, where they lived from agriculture. When Ali Pasha's persecution of the Souliots broke out, immediately after the decision of the former to abandon Souli and hand it over to the Pasha of Ioannina in December 1803, a group of about 500 Ottoman Albanian soldiers passed through Riniasa and attacked the families established there.

Despo Botsi, head of the family after the death of her husband, in order to avoid the soldiers and save her family, shut herself in Castle of Riniasa (better known as the "Tower of Dimoulas", today it is also referred to as the "Castle of Despo") along with all her daughters-in-law and grandchildren. From there, she fought bravely against the soldiers, refusing to surrender. When the guns stopped firing, she set fire to the gunpowder stored in the tower and was killed along with her family.

The death of Despo Botsi has been immortalized in the well-known folk song Despo.

== See also ==
- Dance of Zalongo
