= Souliote War (1803) =

1803 war in the Ottoman Empire

1803 Souliote War
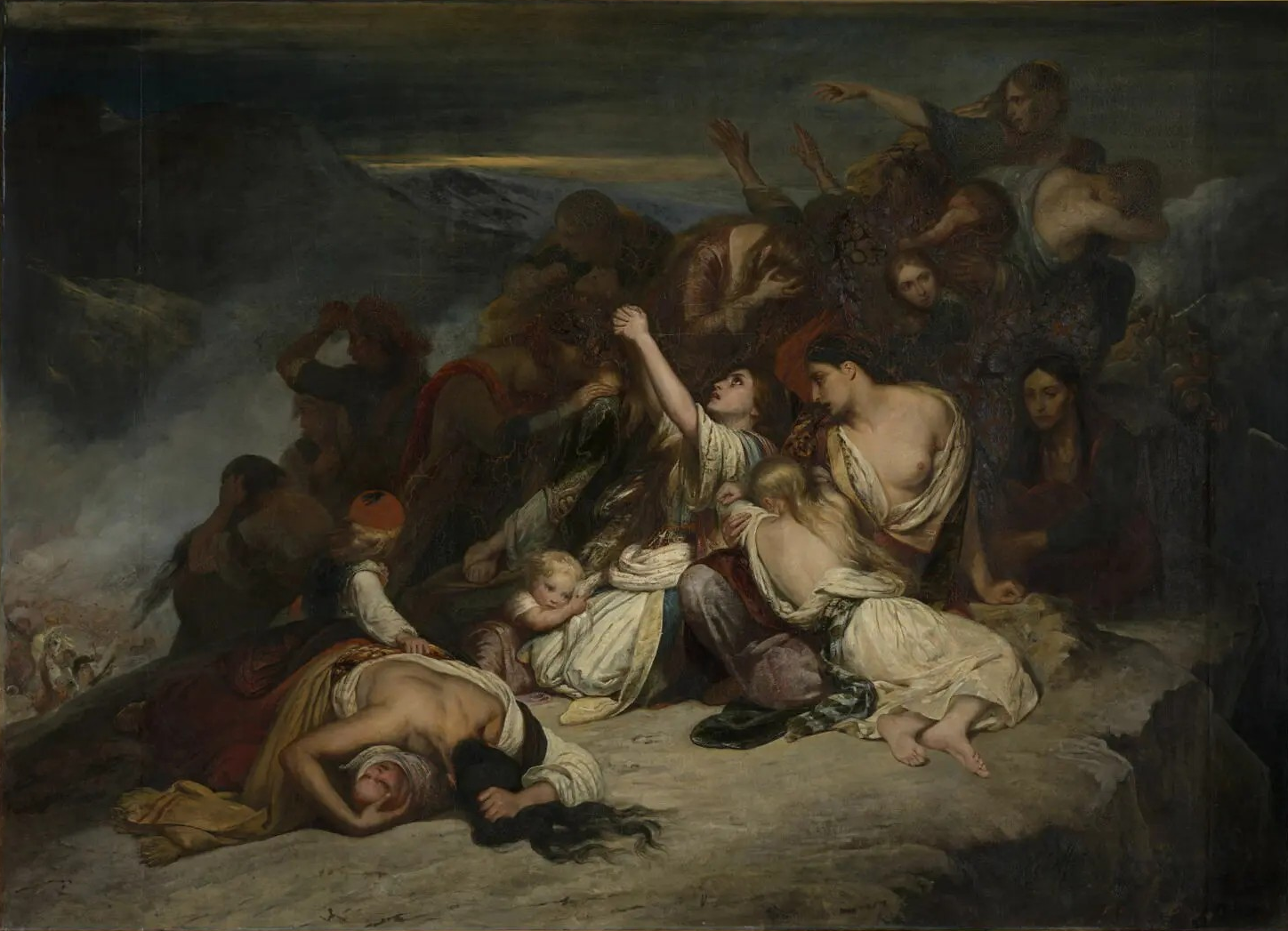
- The Women of Souli by Ary Scheffer, 1827
Date	? 1803 – 12 December 1803
Location	Pashalik of Yanina
Result	Yanina victory

Belligerents
Souliote Confederacy	Pashalik of Yanina

Commanders and leaders
Fotos Tzavellas	Ali Pasha; Veli Pasha

Strength
1,500–2,000	Unknown

Casualties and losses
Unknown deaths 150 enslaved	Unknown

The war between the Souliotes of Epirus and the ruler of the autonomous Ottoman Pashalik of Yanina, Ali Pasha, in 1803, was the last of a series of conflicts, known as the Souliote Wars, that led to the capitulation and expulsion of the Souliotes from their homeland.

== Background ==
During the rule of the Ottoman Empire, the Souliotes had established their own autonomous state, known as the Souliote Confederacy. The confederacy was founded during the 16th century, in the mountains of Thesprotia, near the towns of Paramythia and Parga. The confederacy dominatied the villages in the remote mountainous areas of Epirus, where they successfully resisted Ottoman rule for centuries. At the height of its power, in the second half of the 18th century, the Souliote Confederacy is estimated to have comprised up to 12,000 inhabitants, scattered across approximately 60 villages.

== Conflict ==
In 1803, the Sultan Selim III asked Ali Pasha to press immediately a planned siege of the Souliotes, after being transmitted information that the Souliotes had procured considerable supplies of munitions from French ships. The Souliotes obtained all of their supplies from Parga, and also acquired support from Russia and France, which provided weapons and ammunition to them. For the European powers, the Souliotes were seen as an instrument to weaken the Ottoman Empire. When the British politicians turned to the Ottoman Empire in order to strengthen their forces against Napoleon, the weapons and ammunition supplies were interrupted. Without support from outside, and wearied by years of siege, the unity of the Souliote clans began to fray.

The Botsaris family left Souli for political reasons and parleyed with Ali Pasha. The Souliotes remaining in Souli gathered in Saint George's church and agreed to fight to the death. Among them were no more than 2,000 armed men. The main leaders were Fotos Tzavellas, Dimos Drakos, Tousias Zervas, Koutzonikas, Gogkas Danglis, Yiannakis Sehos, Fotomaras, Tzavaras, Veikos Panou, Zigouris Diamadis, and Giorgos Bousbos. Amazingly, these Souliotes won all the ensuing decisive battles and forced Ali Pasha to build castles in neighboring villages so as to prepare himself for a long siege.

Hostilities re-commenced with renewed vigour, but with little success on the part of Ali. He had then recourse to all the dilatoriness of a siege, and to all the arts of bribery. To the captain, Zimo-Zerva (Tzimas Zervas), he offered 400,000 Turkish piastres if the latter would withdraw his troops from Souli: he was assured, in return, that not a stone in the country would be exchanged for the money. In the meantime thousands upon thousands fell from the ranks of the invaders, and deeds of incredible valour were performed by the Souliotes.

On 3 September 1803, the troops of Ali Pasha, led by his son, Veli Pasha, gained possession of the village of Kakosuli, after the treachery of a Souliote named Pylios Gousis. Gousis admitted 200 soldiers into his house after being paid for that by Veli, saying that the reason for his betrayal was not the money, but his wish to save his son, who was being held captive by Ali Pasha. The Souliotes withdrew to the fortresses of Kiapha and Kughi, where they fought their last battle on 7 December 1803.

The military chief of the Souliotes was the priest Samuel, who was in charge of the magazines on Kungi, leading 300 families in the battle. One of the two hills in the region, called Bira (Kiafa) was abandoned by the clan of Zervas, leaving the other hill, Kughi, as the only stronghold of the Souliotes. Ali Pasha's aim was not only to expel the Souliotes, but also to capture their leaders and hold them hostage. Therefore, he ordered his son Veli to come to an agreement, a treaty with Fotos Tzavelas, the father of Kitsos Tzavelas, later Prime Minister of Greece. On 12 December 1803, Veli Pasha and Fotos Tzavelas signed a capitulation treaty which included a provision that the main clans of the Souliotes, including those of Drakos and Zervas, to relocate to Parga.

In an act of treachery that had become familiar to the Souliotes, Ali Pasha planned to seize them as hostages on the road to Parga. Ali's soldiers were ordered to set up an ambush on the road. However, Ali's own troops were moved to countermand his orders. Some Muslim beys of Paramythia and Amartoloi, members of Veli's army, hearing of this plan, informed the Souliotes, who changed their itinerary at the last minute and managed to survive. The Zervas clan subsequently made its way to Messenia in the Peloponnese peninsula of Greece, where they established the village of Romiri. There, the priest Lambros Zervas, known as Papa Lambros, continued to gather arms for the Greek Revolution, sending guns to his brother, Diamantis Zervas, a leader in the Greek revolutionary army.

Meanwhile, the priest Samuel refused to trust the capitulation treaty with Ali, so on the hill of Kungi, he withdrew to the magazine filled with munitions and declared that no infidel would employ these, which were entrusted to his care, against Christians. He then lit the magazine, causing an enormous explosion and dying a martyr.

== Aftermath ==
=== Zalongo incident ===
The Souliotes who signed an agreement with Ali Pasha that ensured their continued life in Souli suffered the worst fate. They withdrew to the mountain of Zalongo, under the promise of protection by the pasha; however, as soon as Ali gained Kiafa, he ordered his troops to seize and murder them. About 150 men and women were seized and enslaved by Ali and 25 were killed. During this battle, 22 women and six men decided to die rather than to fall into the hands of Ali.

=== Exile ===
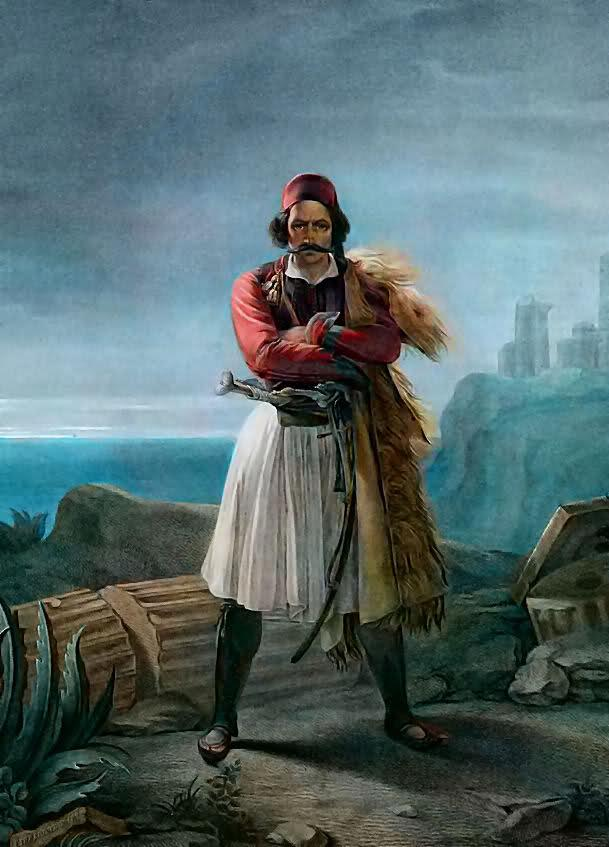
A Souliote reflecting on the Desolation of his country by Ludovico Llipparini, 1826

At the end of three years they capitulated; but Ali violated the conditions. They continued to defend themselves at every step until they obtained a place of security in Corfu.

The eviction and the catastrophe made Souliotes flee to Corfu. In 1820, they reached an agreement with Ali Pasha, and turned back to their homeland, fighting this time side by side with Ali against the Ottoman Empire. Nevertheless, in no more than a year, Souliotes became part of the Greek War of Independence, thus leaving their land forever.

=== Legacy ===
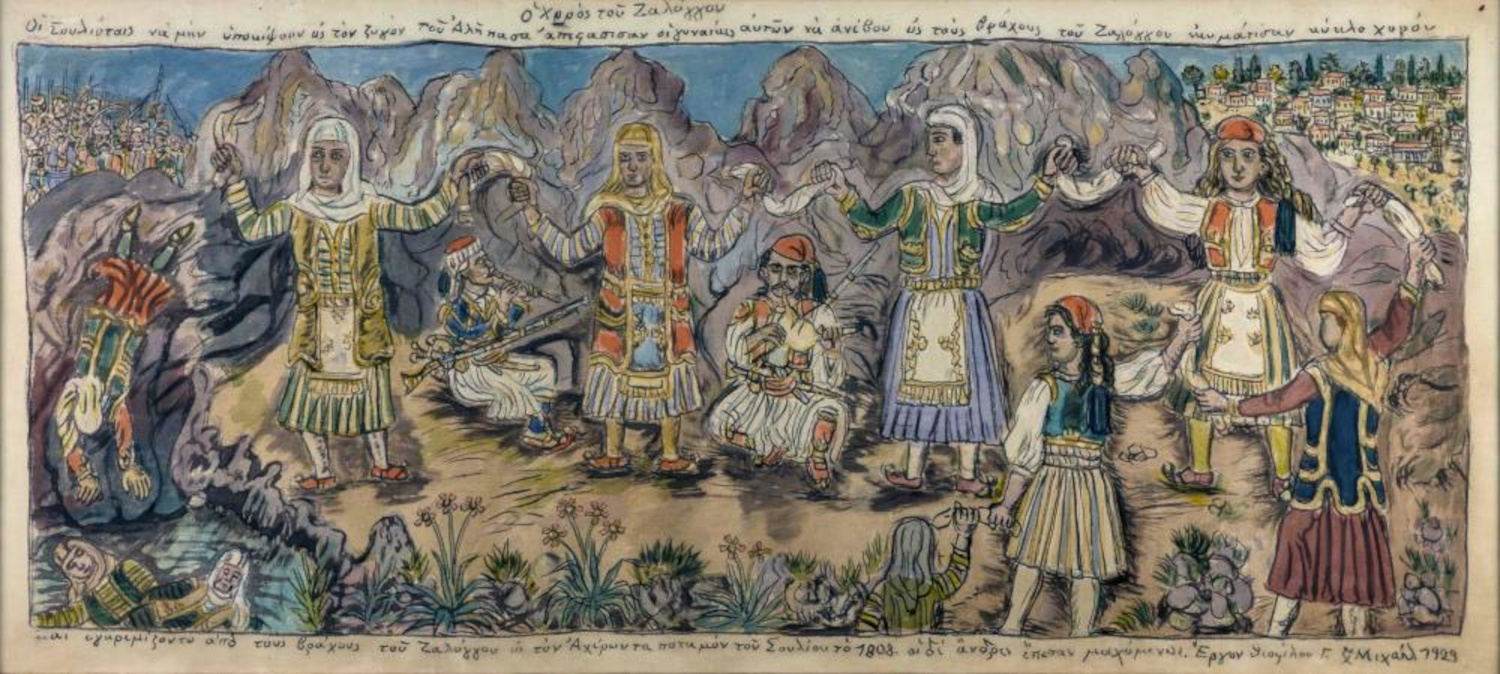
The Dance of Zalongo by Theophilos Hatzimihail, located in the Theophilos Museum in Mytilene

According to the legend, the women of Zalongo, holding their children in their arms, went to the cliff at Zalongo and, while singing and dancing the syrtos, jumped over the precipice one after another. The incident soon became known in Europe. At the Salon of 1827, a French artist named Ary Scheffer exhibited two Romantic paintings, one of which was entitled Les Femmes souliotes ("The Souliot Women"). Today, a monument on the site of Mount Zalongo above village Kamarina (in which the Drakos family is still represented) and above Kassope commemorates their sacrifice. There is also a popular dance-song about the event, which is known and still is danced in Greece today.

== See also ==
- Moscho Tzavela
- Kitsos Botsaris
- Ottoman Greece

== Bibliography ==
- Athanassoglou-Kallmyer, Nina M. (1989). French Images from the Greek War of Independence (1821–1830): Art and Politics under the Restoration. Yale University Press. ISBN 0-300-04532-8.
- Asiatic Journal and Monthly Register for British and Foreign India, China and Australasia. Vol. 25. Black, Parbury, & Allen. 1828.
- Bartholdy, Jakob Salomon (1807). Voyage en Grèce, fait dans les années 1803 et 1804. Dentu. pp. 254–258.
- JSTOR (Organization) (1954). Journal of the International Folk Music Council, Volumes 6-10. Published with the assistance of the International Music Council, under the auspices of United Nations Educational Scientific and Cultural Organisation for the International Folk Music Council by W. Heffer, 1954.
- Mynatt, Constance Virginia; Kaiman, Bernard D. (1968). Folk Dancing for Students and Teachers. Wm. C. Brown Co.
- Papaspyrou-Karadēmētriou, Euthymia; Lada-Minōtou, Maria; Ethniko Historiko Mouseio (Greece) (1994). The National Historical Museum. Historical and Ethnological Society of Greece. ISBN 960-85573-0-5.
- Pritchett, William Kendrick (1991). The Greek State at War, Volume 5. University of California Press. ISBN 0-520-07374-6.
- Pritchett, William Kendrick (1996). Greek Archives, Cults, and Topography. J.C. Gieben. ISBN 90-5063-147-9.
- Psimuli, Vaso (2010). Βασίλης Παναγιωτόπουλος (ed.). Μάρκος Μπότσαρης. Ιστορική Βιβλιοθήκη - Οι Ιδρυτές της Νεότερης Ελλάδας. Athens: Τα Νέα.
- Psimuli, Vaso (2016). Suli dhe suljotët [Souli and the Souliots]. Toena. ISBN 9789928205728.
- Royal Society of Canada (1943). Mémoires de la Société royale du Canada. Royal Society of Canada.
- Sakellariou, M. V. (1997). Epirus: 4000 Years of Greek History and Civilization. Ekdotike Athenon. ISBN 960-213-371-6.
