= Riniasa Castle =

Medieval castle in Greece

- Κάστρο Ῥινιάσας
- Riza, Western Greece

Site information
- Type: hilltop citadel
- Owner: Greek Ministry of Culture
- Controlled by: Despotate of Epirus 14th century; Ottoman Empire 1463
- Open to the public: Yes
- Condition: ruin

Location
- Location within Greece
- Coordinates: 39.0803°N 20.3533°E
- Height: 185 m

Site history
- Built: late 13th century/early 14th century
- Built by: Byzantine Empire
- Materials: hewn stone (ashlar)

Riniasa Castle (Greek: Κάστρο Ῥινιάσας), originally known as Thomokastron (Greek: Θωμόκαστρον, lit. 'Castle of Thomas'), is a medieval Byzantine fortress on the coast of Epirus, close to the modern village of Riza near Preveza. The castle is today in a ruinous condition.

== History ==
The castle was built (or rebuilt) by Thomas I the Despot of Epirus, at the beginning of the 14th century. Hence, was named Thomokastron ("Thomas' castle") or the "castle of the despotes." It was conquered by the Ottoman Empire in 1463 and liberated from the Turks and the rest of Greek Epirus during the 20th century. It is the site of the 1803 self-immolation of Despo Botsi and her family, after which it is also known as Despo's Castle (Κάστρο της Δέσπως).

== Sources ==
- Brooks, Allan (2013). Castles of Northwest Greece: From the early Byzantine Period to the eve of the First World War. Aetos Press. ISBN 978-0-9575846-0-0.
- Soustal, Peter; Koder, Johannes (1981). Tabula Imperii Byzantini, Band 3: Nikopolis und Kephallēnia (in German). Vienna: Verlag der Österreichischen Akademie der Wissenschaften. ISBN 978-3-7001-0399-8.
- Veikou, Myrto (2012). Byzantine Epirus: A Topography of Transformation. Settlements of the Seventh-Twelfth Centuries in Southern Epirus and Aetoloacarnania, Greece. BRILL. ISBN 9004221514.
