= Mount Zalongo =

Mountain of northwestern Greece

Coordinates: 39°8′45″N 20°41′23″E

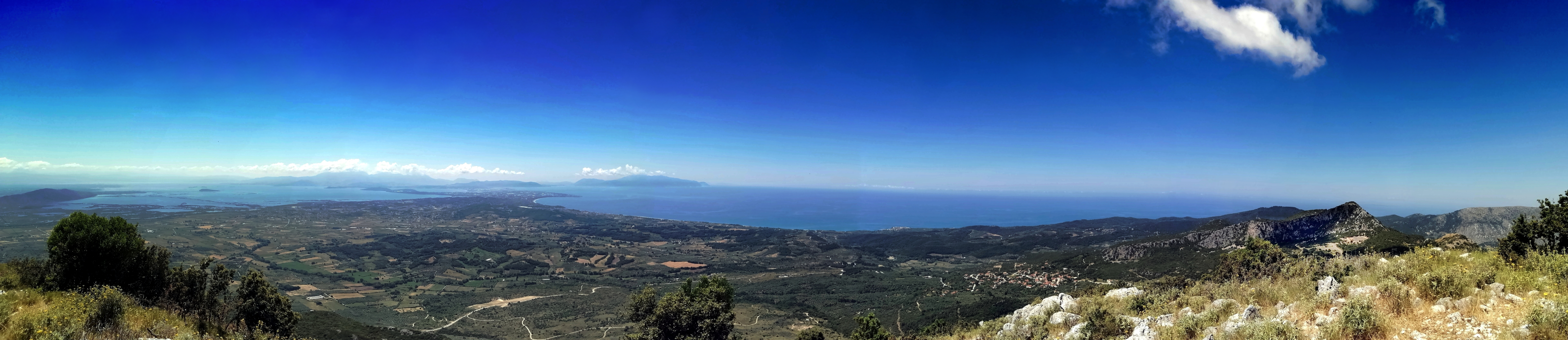
Panoramic view from the top (Tsouka) of Mountain Zalongo

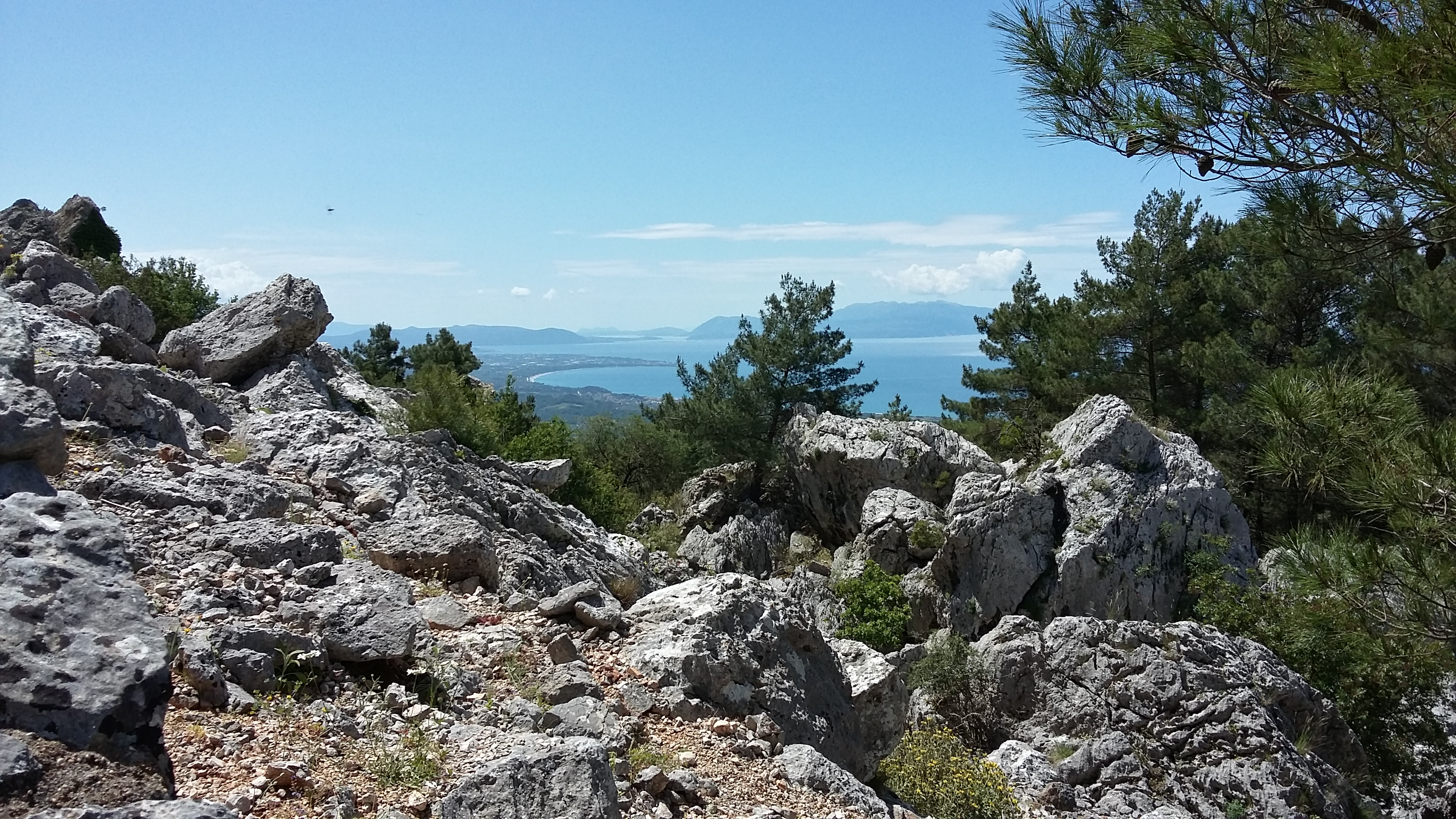
The rocks where the Souliotisses fell with their children

Mount Zalongo (Greek: Ζάλογγο) is a small bare mountain of Greece with an altitude of 462 meters. It is located north of Preveza, above the village of Kamarina, and belongs to the Kasopaian mountains in Epirus. The heavily grazed area includes a limited forest zone, steep cliffs and arable land. The area below the historical monument has been reforested with trachea pines (Pinus brutia) while scattered individuals of mossy oak also grow (Quercus pubescens) cypress tree (Cupressus sempervirens) and macroscale oak (Quercus macrolepis). Regarding the herbaceous flora, two endemic species of Greece have been mentioned (Galium advenum) and the Balkan (Saxifraga rotundifolia) flora respectively.

The name of the mountain was associated with the "Dance of Zalongo" in 1803, when a group of Souliots with their children decided to die free rather than fall into the hands of the Ottoman Albanian troops of Ali Pasha of Ioannina. At the western end of the Zalongo mountain plateau, the largest statue in Greece was erected during 1950–1961, with the title Monument of Zalongo, designed by the sculptor George Zongolopoulos.

== See also ==
- Dance of Zalongo

== Sources ==
- Μεγάλη Ελληνική Εγκυκλοπαίδεια Δρανδάκη, τ.ΙΑ΄, σ.901.
