= Dance of Zalongo =

1803 mass suicide in Epirus, Greece

Coordinates: 39°8′59″N 20°40′57″E

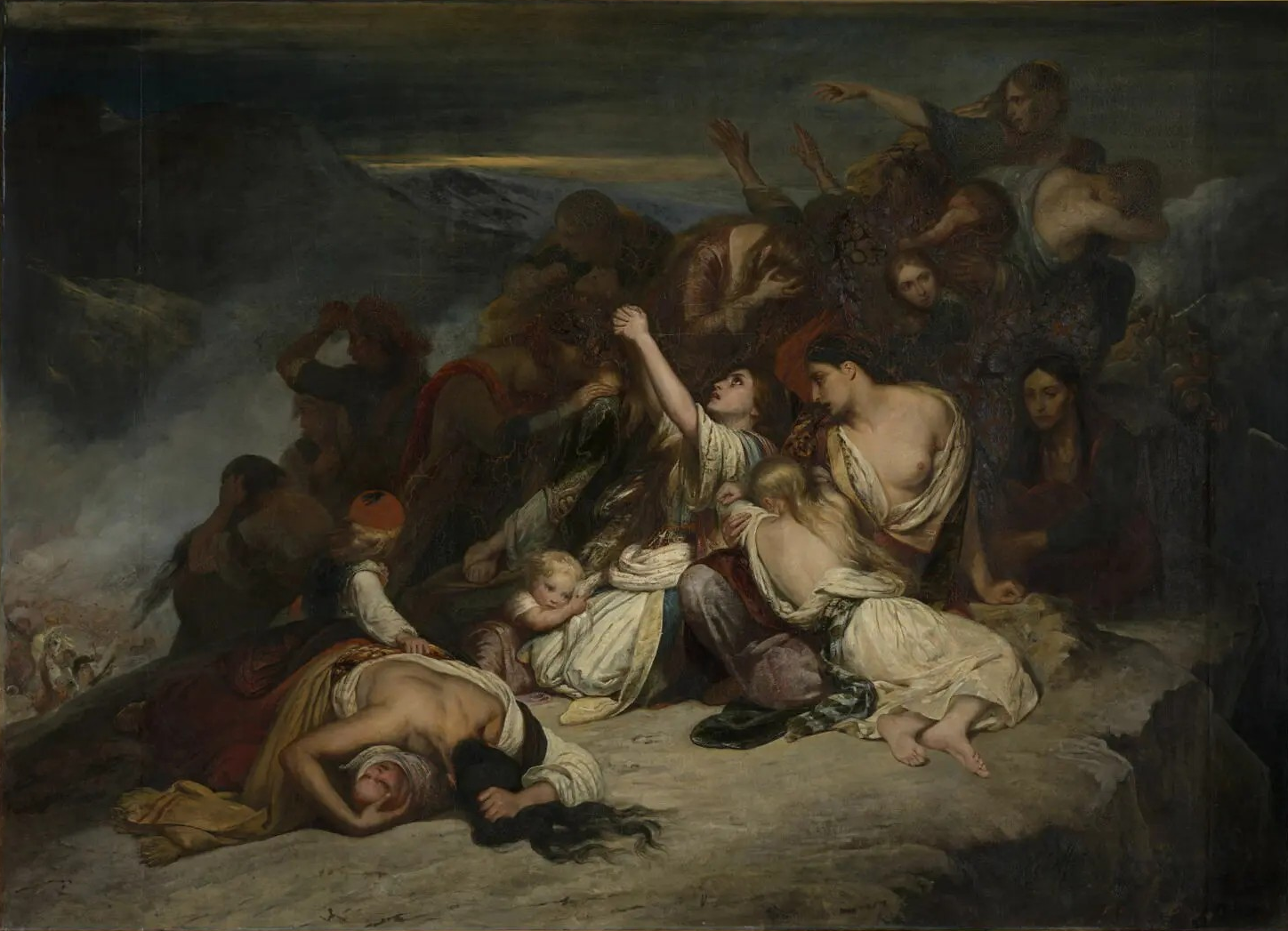
- The Women of Souli by Ary Scheffer, 1827
- Date: 1803
- Location: Epirus, Greece
- Cause: Souliote War (1803)
- Deaths: 60

Dance of Zalongo (Greek: Χορός του Ζαλόγγου, Horos tou Zalongou; Albanian: vallja e Zangolës) refers to the mass suicide of Souliote women and their children that is said to have occurred in the aftermath of the invasion of Ottoman troops on Souli on December 16, 1803. The event is commemorated in Greece in the context of the Greek War of Independence. Approximately 60 women were trapped at Mount Zalongo in Epirus during the period of Ottoman control. Rather than submit to the Ottoman troops chasing them, they decided to turn towards the cliff's edge and die with their infants and children. According to tradition, they did this one after the other whilst dancing and singing. A number of Greek theatrical dramas and a song in folk style commemorating the event are also named the Dance of Zalongo.

The story of the Zalongo women became so popular within the Greek community that more Greek women chose to commit suicide rather than to suffer rape and enslavement. During the Greek War of Independence, after a long siege of the city of Naoussa by Ottoman forces, thirteen women and their children took refuge in a hill above the waterfall of the river Arapitsa, in Stoubanos. The Ottoman forces set fire to the city, and much like the Souliote women of Zalongo, they jumped to their deaths with their children in the Arapitsa of Naoussa. In the 1950s, the city of Naoussa was given the title of Heroic City, and a monument was erected at the site in the 1970s by Greek sculptor Katerina Halepa Katsatou in their honour.

== History ==
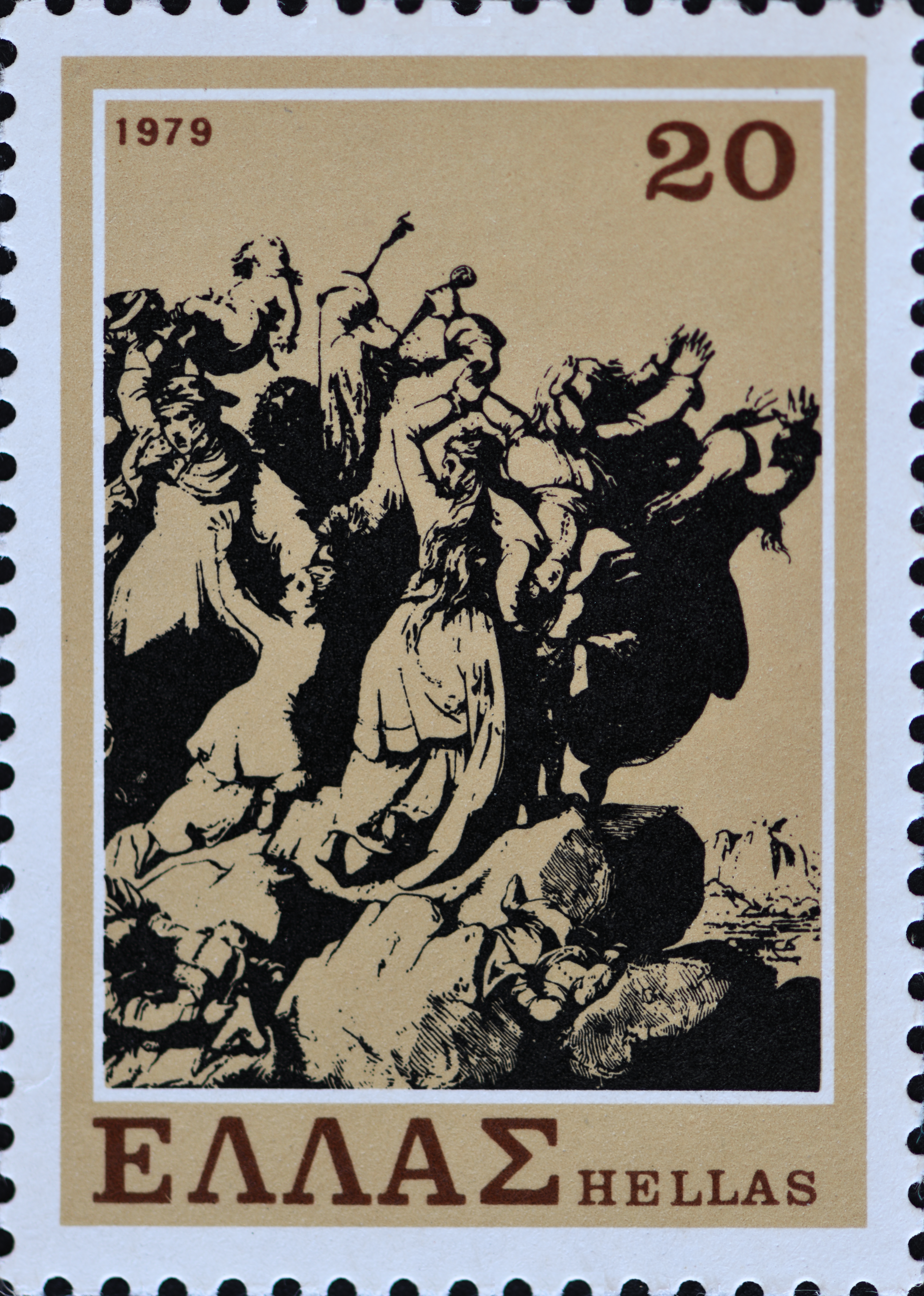
Greek Stamp Dance of Zalongo

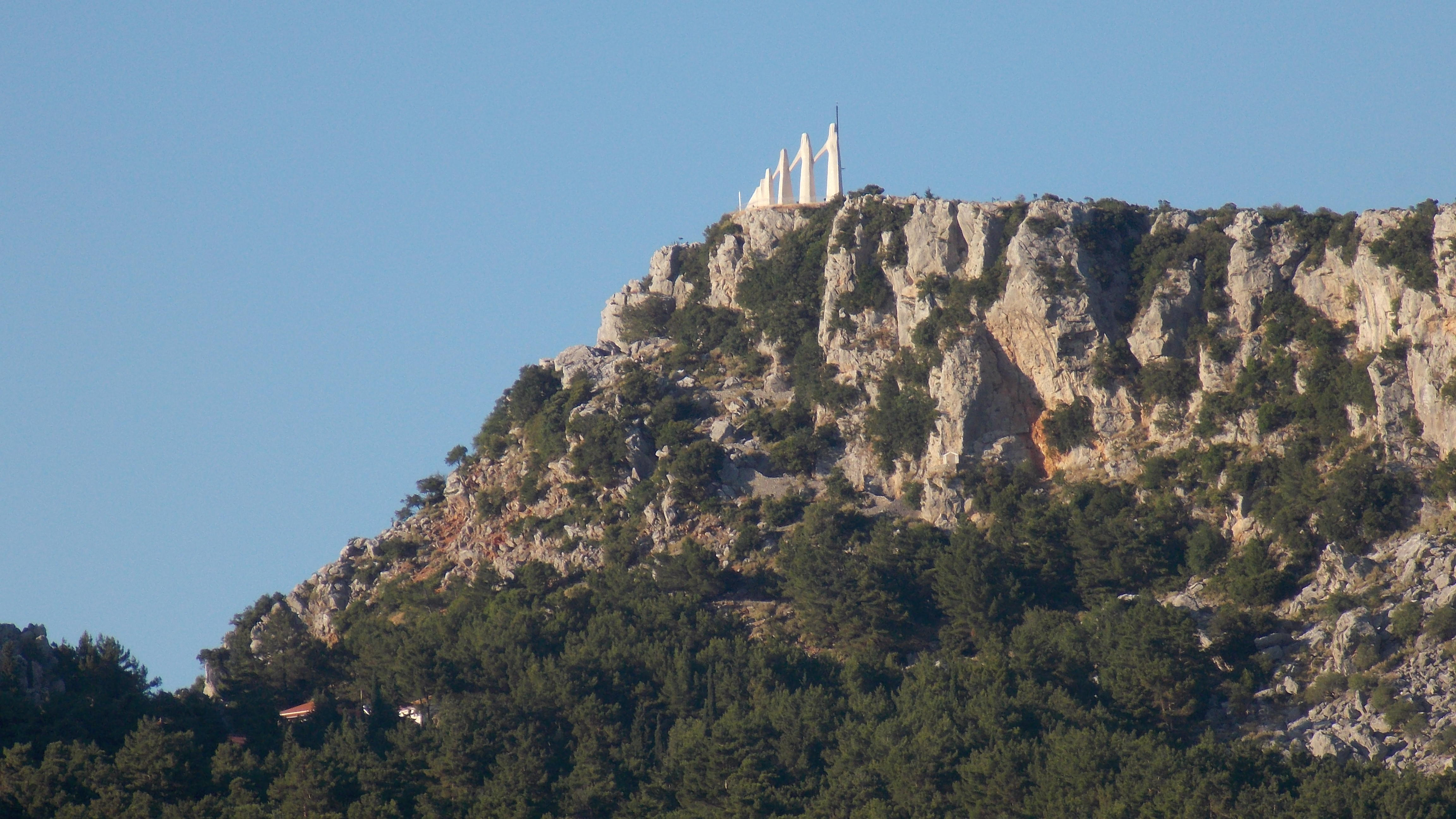
The rocks of Zalongo where the Souliote women threw themselves off in 1803. The monument on the top was unveiled in 1961.

During the Souliote War in December 1803, the Souliotes began evacuating Souli after their defeat by the forces of the local Ottoman-Albanian ruler, Ali Pasha. The Souliote War gave rise to many legends and stories, such as the Dance of Zalongo, which became well-known throughout Europe. The events of Zalongo are portrayed in different ways depending on the version. Those versions that rely on Christoforos Perraivos' 'History of Suli and Parga' depict Ali Pasha as a cruel tyrant whose acts are all done in betrayal. These versions claim that Ali ordered his men to chase the Souliote refugees as they travelled to Parga, with the refugees only surviving because Ali's men did not want to kill them; however, the Souliotes that remained on the promise of protection from Ali withdrew to the mountain of Zalongo. It is claimed that Ali reneged on his promise and ordered his men to attack. The Souliote men were ready to fight to the death, whilst the women, holding their children in their arms, formed a circle dance on Zalongo and danced over the cliff to their deaths to prevent themselves from being taken into slavery in the Ottoman Empire.

These events may have occurred, but Ali's motivations are pictured differently in other versions. The Alipashiad, which does not ignore that many Souliotes were enslaved, emphasises Ali's honourable dealings with the Souliote chief Fotos Tzavelas, such as by releasing Fotos' wife who had been taken as a hostage and providing safe passage to Fotos and a number of families who fled to Parga. William Plate of the Royal Geographical Society suggests that Ali was infuriated by the deception of the Souliote monk known as Last Judgement Samuel and sought to take revenge upon the Souliote fugitives, who were then forced to fight their way through to Parga. Samuel was the leader of a faction of Souliotes who preferred to die rather than surrender to Ali Pasha, and so when Ali's troops came to take the Souliote arsenal, Samuel and five collaborators set fire to the magazines and blew up the arsenal with the soldiers inside. Some of the Souliote fugitives decided to seek refuge at the convent of Zalongo, and after the convent was stormed and its defenders killed, those that could escape made their way to the top of the mountain, where they danced to their death before their attackers could reach them. According to the legend, they jumped down the precipice one after the other while singing and dancing.

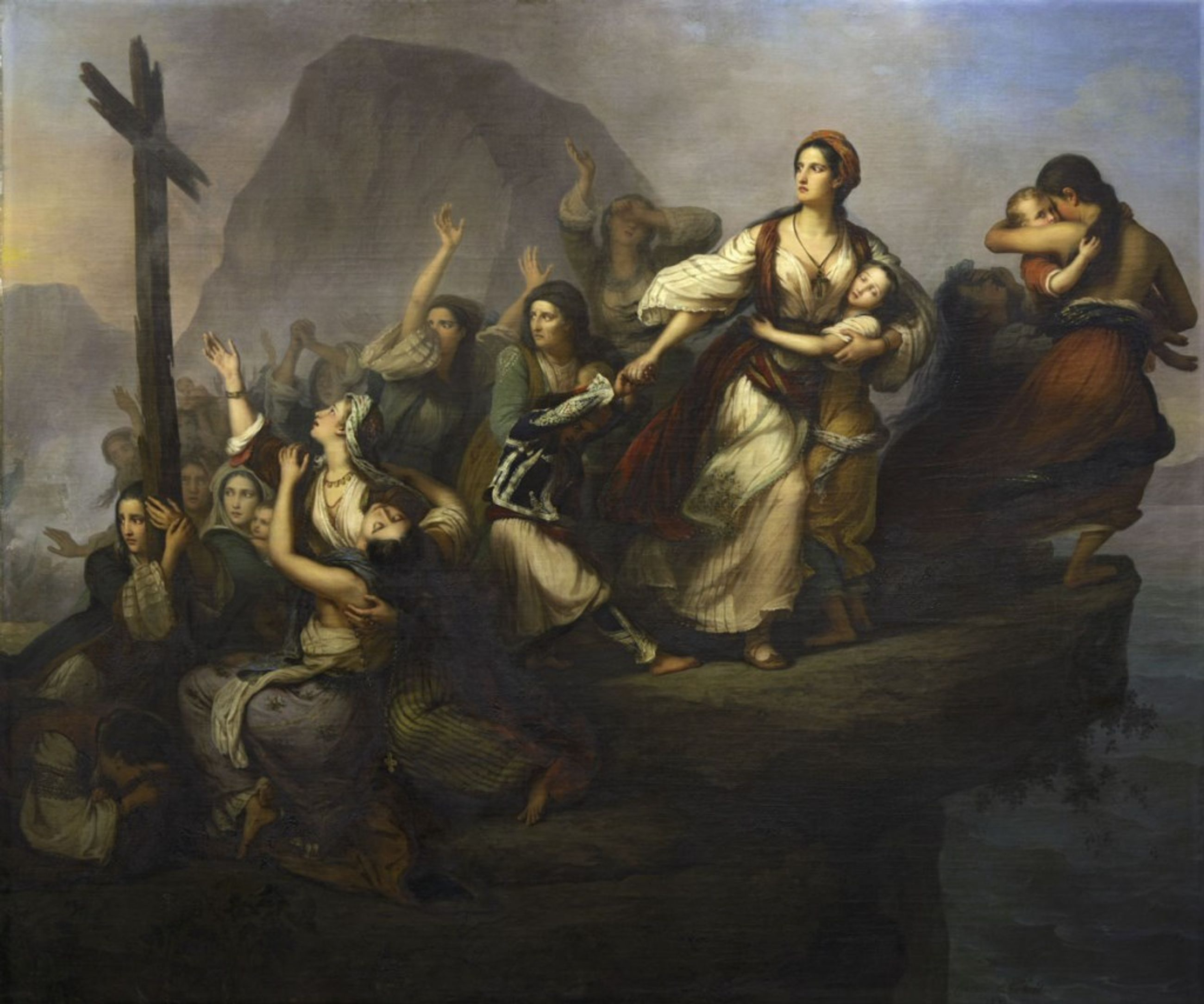
Greek Women of Souli Running to Their Death (c. 1838) by Constance Blanchard

The incident soon became known across Europe. The story reached the English-speaking world in the 1820s. During the Greek War of Independence, the story was used throughout England and the United States to gain sympathy for the war. Articles repeated a story about 100 women from Souli who took their lives along with their children while singing and dancing to avoid capture. European painters used the theme in their works. At the Paris Salon of 1827, the French artist Ary Scheffer exhibited two Romantic paintings, one of which was entitled The Women of Souli. French female painter Constance Blanchard painted Greek Women of Souli Running to Their Death in 1838; it was exhibited at the Paris Salon that same year. Today, the Monument of Zalongo on Mount Zalongo in Cassope commemorates their sacrifice.

== Play and songs ==
There is a popular Greek dance-song, a kalamatianos in 7/8 time signature, about the event, which is known and danced throughout Greece today. It was part of popular drama, written by Spyridon Peresiadis, published in 1903 and staged first in 1904. The Greek folk song "Dance of Zalongo" has the following lyrics:

English
Greek

Farewell poor world,
Farewell sweet life,
and you, my wretched country,
Farewell for ever

Farewell springs,
Valleys, mountains and hills
Farewell springs
And you, women of Souli

The fish cannot live on the land
Nor the flower on the sand
And the women of Souli
Cannot live without freedom

Farewell springs,
...

The women of Souli
Have not only learnt how to survive
They also know how to die
Not to tolerate slavery

Farewell springs,
...

Έχε γεια καημένε κόσμε,
έχε γεια γλυκιά ζωή
Και ’συ δύστυχη πατρίδα
έχε γεια παντοτινή.

Έχετε γεια βρυσούλες
λόγγοι, βουνά, ραχούλες
Έχετε γεια βρυσούλες
και σεις Σουλιωτοπούλες

Στη στεριά δε ζει το ψάρι
ούτ’ ανθός στην αμμουδιά
Κι οι Σουλιώτισσες δεν ζούνε
δίχως την ελευθεριά.

Έχετε γεια βρυσούλες
...

Οι Σουλιώτισσες δε μάθαν
για να ζούνε μοναχά
Ξέρουνε και να πεθαίνουν
να μη στέργουν στη σκλαβιά.

Έχετε γεια βρυσούλες
...

Peresiadis describes this part of his drama as a "chorus of women", which can be translated as "dance", but in that context it possibly means a "group of women", as that in ancient Greek drama.

An Albanian dance-song called Vallja e Zallongut ("Dance of Zalongo") was developed with lyrics that refer to the same aforementioned mass suicide, published in 1962 by Zihnni Sako:

Albanian

Lamtumirë, o Sul, i shkretë,
se po ndahemi per jetë.
Lamtumirë, o Sul i shkretë,
se na do t’ikim për jetë.

Ne po vdesim për liri,
se nuk duam skllavëri.
Lamtumirë, ju male e fusha,
na e punoi Pilo Gusha,
I pabesi faqezi,
s’pati turp, as perëndi.

Lamtumirë, o fusha e male,
ne vdesim pa frikë fare.
Jemi bila shqipëtare,
vdesim duke hedhur valle.
Lamtumirë, o Sul i shkretë,
lamtumir’ për gjithë jetë.

English

Goodbye, oh desolate Souli,
for we part ways for life.
Goodbye, oh desolate Souli,
because we will leave forever.

But we will die for freedom,
because we do not want slavery.
Goodbye, oh mountains and valleys,
this was done by Pelios Gousis,
The wicked scoundrel,
had no shame, no god.

Goodbye, oh valleys and mountains,
We die without fear at all.
It’s because we are Albanians,
we die by dancing.
Goodbye, oh desolate Souli,
goodbye for all eternity.

== Paintings ==
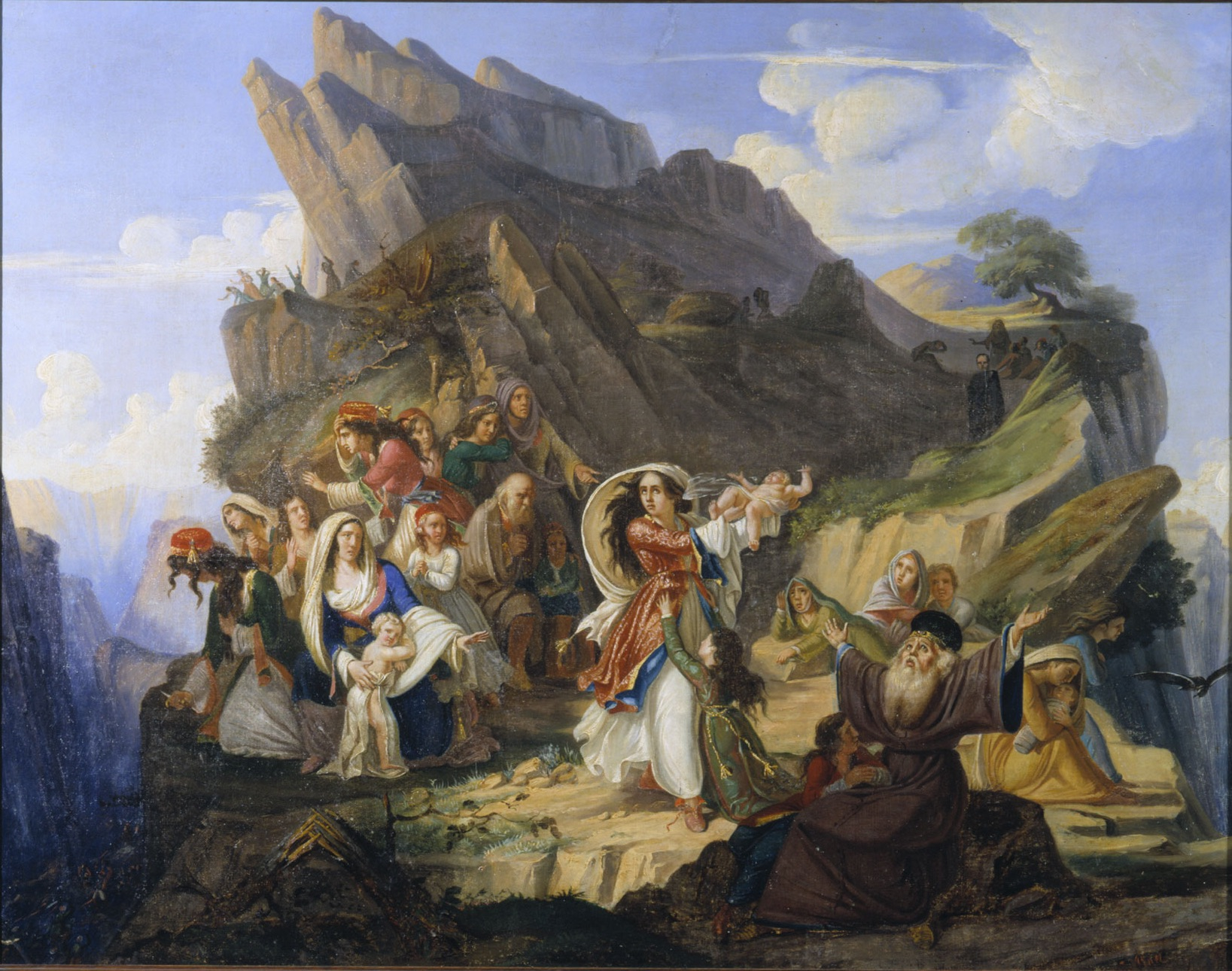
Dance of Zalongo by Claude Pinet

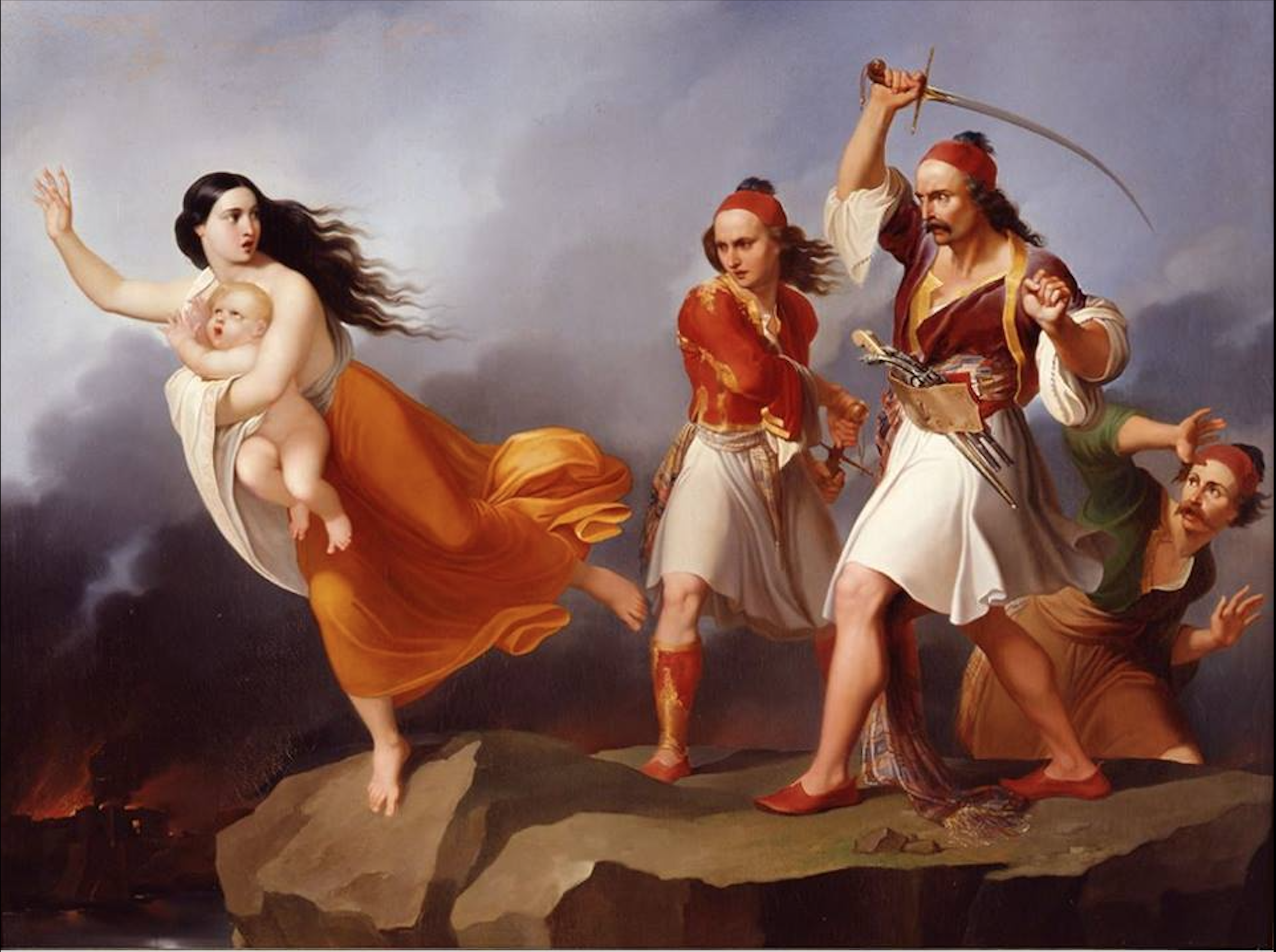
Dance of Zalongo by Filippo Agricola

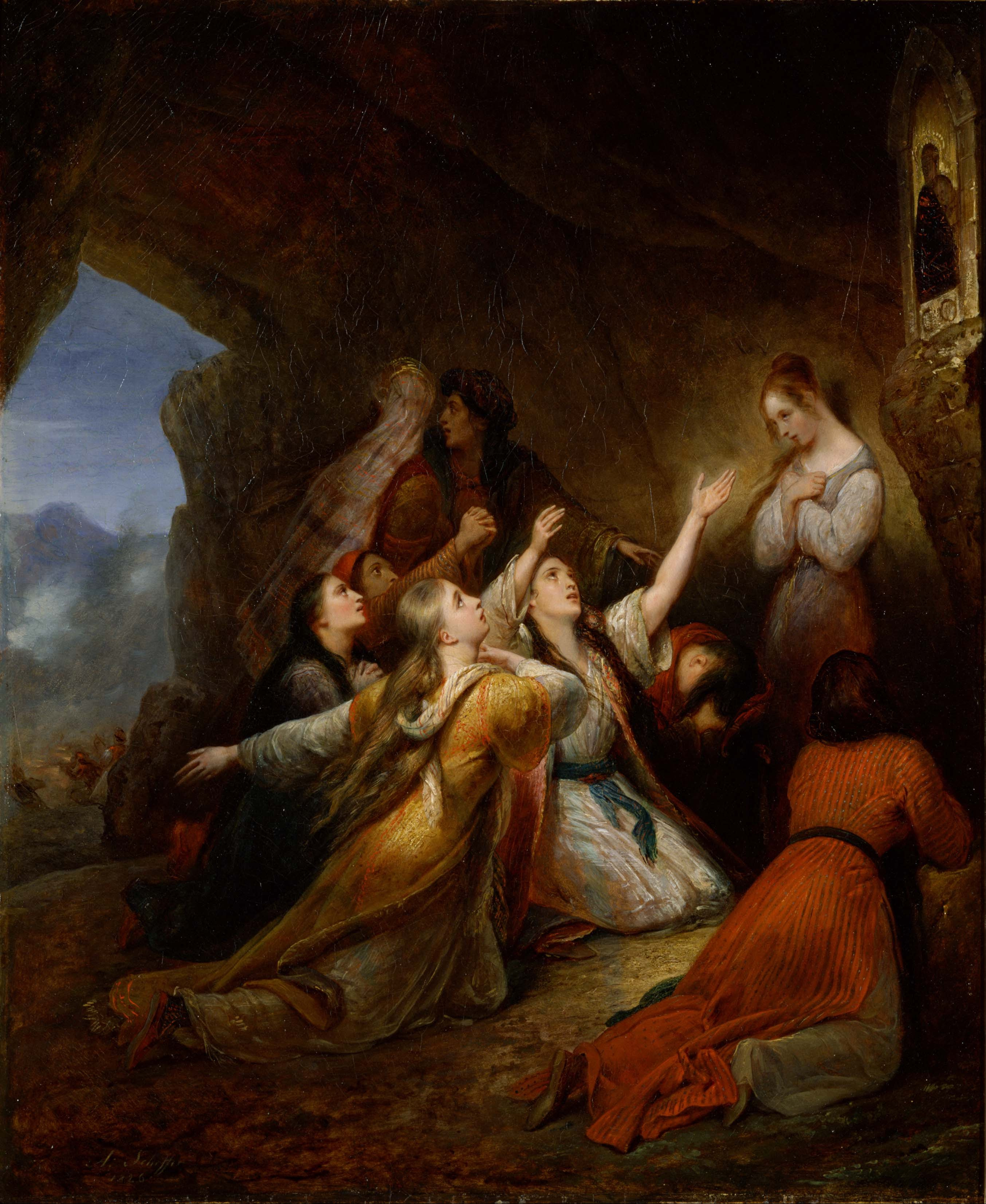
Souli Women with the Virgin Ary Scheffer

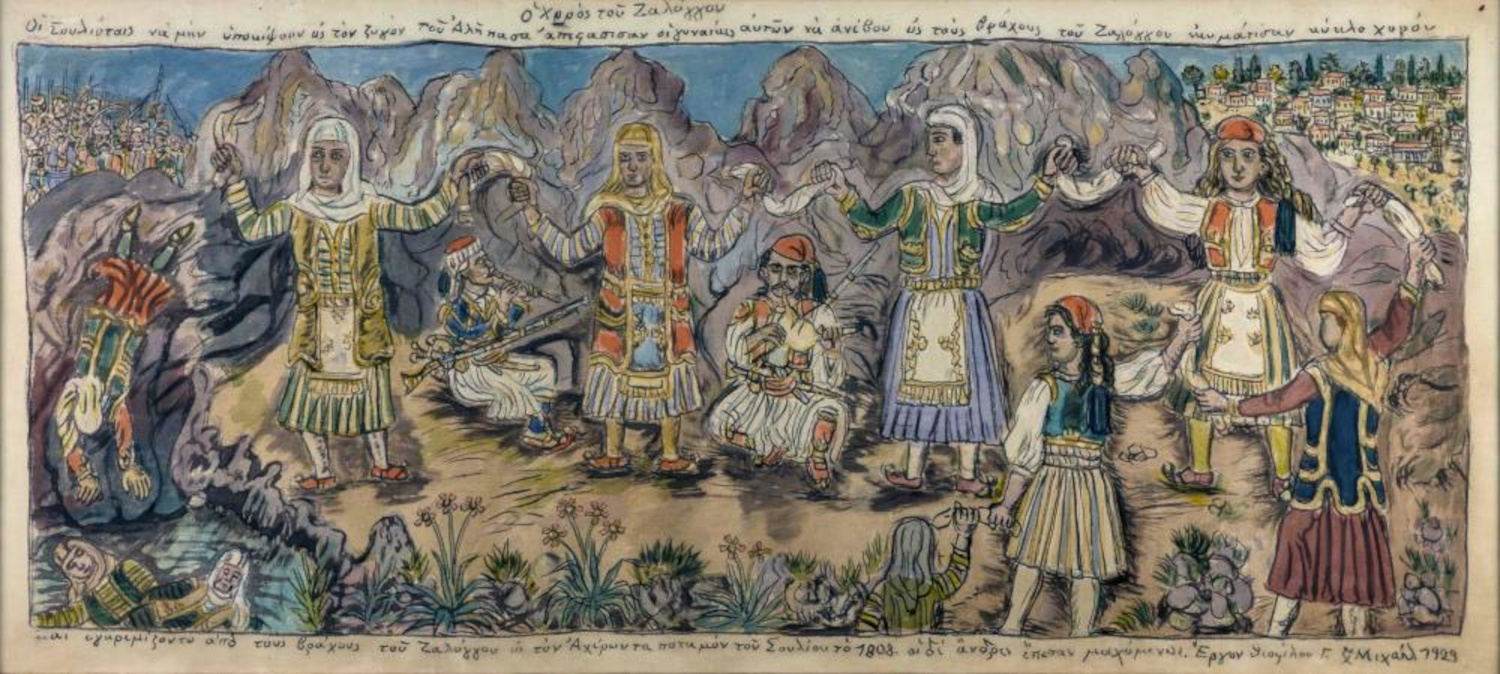
Dance of Zalongo by Theophilos Hatzimihail

== See also ==
- Despo Botsi

== Sources ==
- Athanassoglou-Kallmyer, Nina M. (1989). French Images from the Greek War of Independence (1821-1830): Art and Politics under the Restoration. New Haven, Connecticut: Yale University Press. ISBN 0-300-04532-8.
- International Folk Music Council (1954). Journal of the International Folk Music Council, Volumes 6–10. Cambridge, England: Published for the International Folk Music Council by W. Heffer & Sons.
- Mero Rrapaj, Fatos (1983). Këngë popullore nga Çamëria [Popular songs from Chameria] (in Albanian). Tirana, Albania: Akademia e Shkencave e RPS të Shqipërisë, Instituti i Kulturës Popullore.
- Mynatt, Constance Virginia; Kaiman, Bernard D. (1968). Folk Dancing for Students and Teachers. Dubuque, Iowa: Wm. C. Brown Co.
- Papaspyrou-Karadēmētriou, Euthymia; Lada-Minōtou, Maria; Ethniko Historiko Mouseio (Greece) (1994). The National Historical Museum. Athens, Greece: Historical and Ethnological Society of Greece. ISBN 960-85573-0-5.
- Pritchett, William Kendrick (1996). Greek Archives, Cults, and Topography. Amsterdam, the Netherlands: J.C. Gieben. ISBN 90-5063-147-9.
- Pritchett, William Kendrick (1991). The Greek State at War, Volume 5. Berkeley, California: University of California Press. ISBN 0-520-07374-6.
- Royal Society of Canada (1943). Mémoires de la Société Royale du Canada. Ottawa, Canada: Royal Society of Canada.
- Sakellariou, M. V. (1997). Epirus: 4000 Years of Greek History and Civilization. Athens, Greece: Ekdotike Athenon. ISBN 960-213-371-6.
- Sako, Zihni, ed. (1962). Mbledhës të Hershëm të Folklorit Shqiptar (1635–1912). Tirana, Albania: Instituti i Folklorit, Sektori i Folklorit Letrar.
