= Filippo Agricola =

Italian painter (1776–1857)

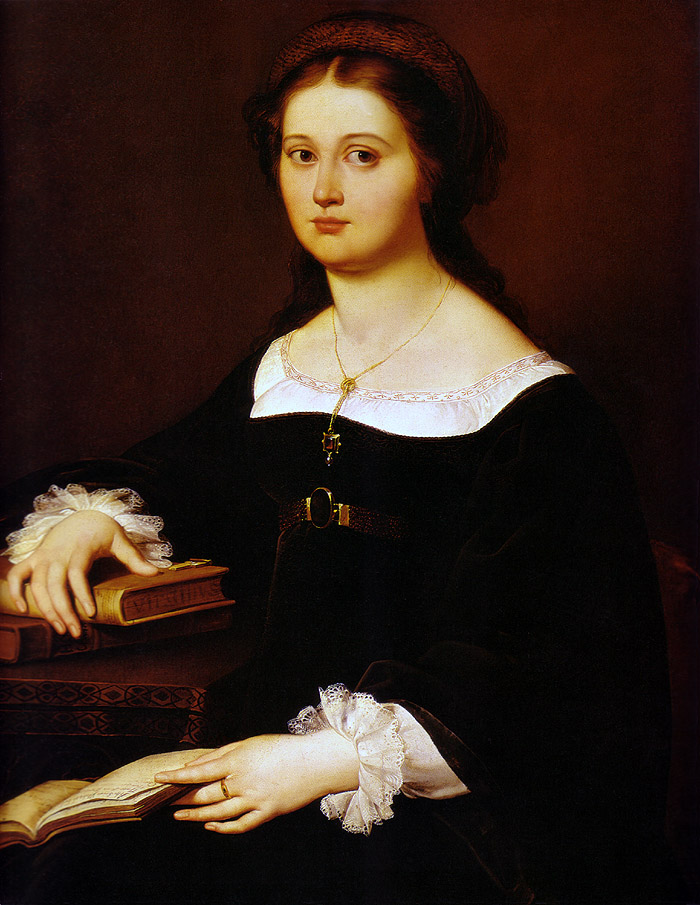
Portrait of Constance Monti Perticari (1821)

Filippo Agricola (1776–1857) was an Italian painter of the 19th century, mainly active in Rome.

He was born at Urbino but trained in the Accademia di San Luca in Rome. He became that institution's president in 1843. He also became director of the mosaic factory of the Vatican. He worked mainly in Rome, painting for the churches of San Onofrio, San Giovanni in Laterano, and San Paolo fuori le Mura. He died during the time he was at work in the latter. He painted the portraits of the Crown Princess of Denmark (1822), and of the Countess Costanza Monti Perticari now found in the Galleria Nazionale d'arte Moderna in Rome. Agricola also painted a portrait of Lt General Sir Gordon Drummond while Drummond was convalescing in Rome from a gunshot wound received in the War of 1812.
