= Kamarina, Greece =

Kamarina Καμαρίνα
- Community
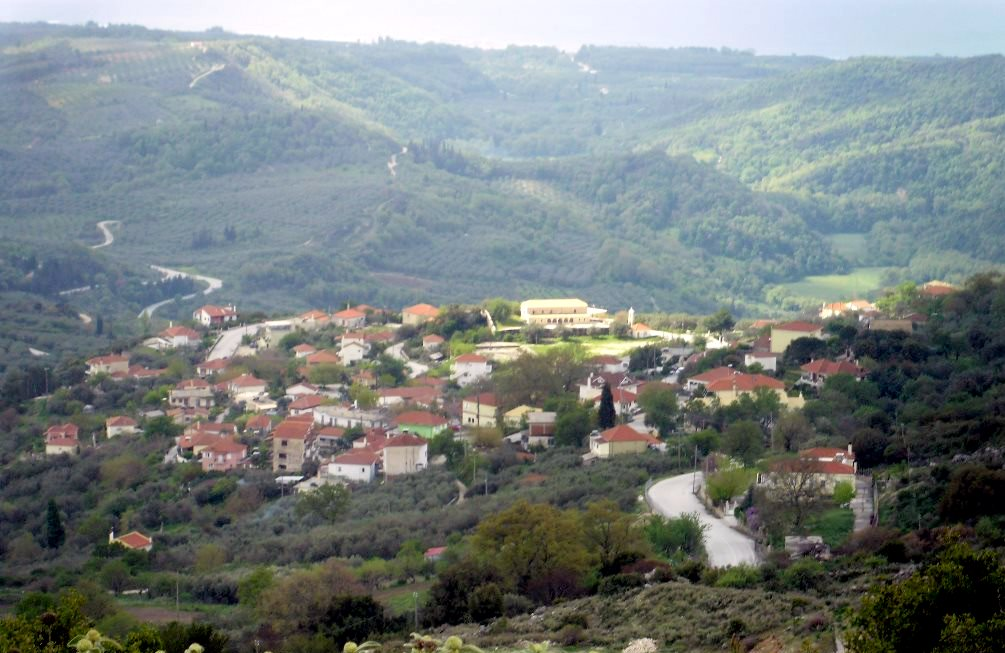

- Location within Greece
- Coordinates: 39°08′N 20°40′E
- Country: Greece
- Administrative region: Epirus
- Regional unit: Preveza
- Municipality: Preveza
- Municipal unit: Zalongo

Population (2021)
  - Community: 213
- Time zone: UTC+2 (EET)
  - Summer (DST): UTC+3 (EEST)

Kamarina (Greek: Καμαρίνα) is a village of Preveza regional unit, in the region of Epirus, in western Greece. It is located about 25 kilometres north of the town of Preveza, at an elevation of 400 metres. Kamarina belongs to the Zalongo municipal unit. Nowadays, its population is around 200 citizens. The ruins of ancient Cassope are situated 1 km north of the village.
