= Theophilos Hatzimihail =

Greek artist (c.1870–1934)

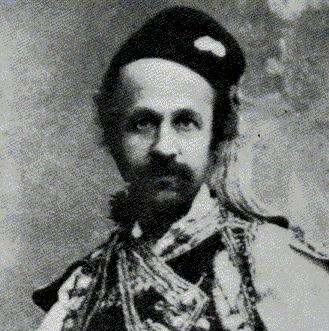
Theophilos Hatzimihail, circa 1900.

Theophilos Chatzimichail (Greek: Θεόφιλος Χατζημιχαήλ or Θεόφιλος Κεφαλάς; c. 1870 – 24 March 1934), known simply as Theophilos, was a Greek folk painter and major contributor in modern Greek art. The main subject of his works are Greek characters and the illustration of Greek traditional folklore and history.

== Life and work ==
The exact birthdate of Theophilos is unknown. However, it is believed that he was born between 1867 and 1870 in Vareia (Βαρειά), a village outside of Mytilene, Lesbos (then part of the Ottoman Empire). His father, Gabriel Kefalas (Γαβριήλ Κεφαλάς), was a shoemaker, while his mother Pinelopi Hatzimihail was a daughter of an iconographer. When he was very young, he was mediocre at school, but he had a special interest in painting, having learned the basics from his grandfather.

His life was very hard, partially because people made fun of him since he often wore the fustanella in public. At the age of 18 he abandoned his home and family and worked as a gate-keeper (καβάσης, kavasis) at the Greek consulate in Smyrna.

He stayed in Smyrna for a few years before he settled in the city of Volos in about 1897, searching for occasional work and painting in houses and shops of the area. Many of his murals exist today. Most of his years he spent in Ano Volos. His protector during that period was the landholder Giannis Kontos, for whom he did many works. Today the house of Kontos is the Theophilos Museum. As well as painting, he was also involved in organizing popular theatrical acts for national ceremonies, and in the carnival period he had a major role, sometimes dressing as Alexander the Great, with pupils in Macedonian phalanx formation, and sometimes as a hero of the Greek Revolution, with gear and costumes made by himself.

In 1927 he returned to Mytilene. Legend states that he left Volos because of an incident in a kafeneio (coffee shop) where someone played a joke on him in front of others and threw him down from a ladder where he was painting.

In Mytilene, despite the mockery of the people, he continued to draw, painting many murals in villages for little payment, usually for a plate of food and a cup of wine. Many of his works of this period have been lost, either due to natural aging or from damage by the owners.

In Mytilene, the renowned art critic and publisher Stratis Eleftheriadis (Tériade), who lived in Paris, discovered Theophilos and brought him a great deal of recognition and also international publicity, though posthumous.

Theophilos died in March 1934 in Mytilene, on the eve of the Annunciation, perhaps from food poisoning. In 1961, his works were exhibited in the Louvre as a sample of a genuine folk painter of Greece. In 1965, Tériade donated 86 painted works on textile to the Municipality of Lesvos, along with a building that became the Theophilos Museum in Vareia, Lesbos.

== Gallery ==
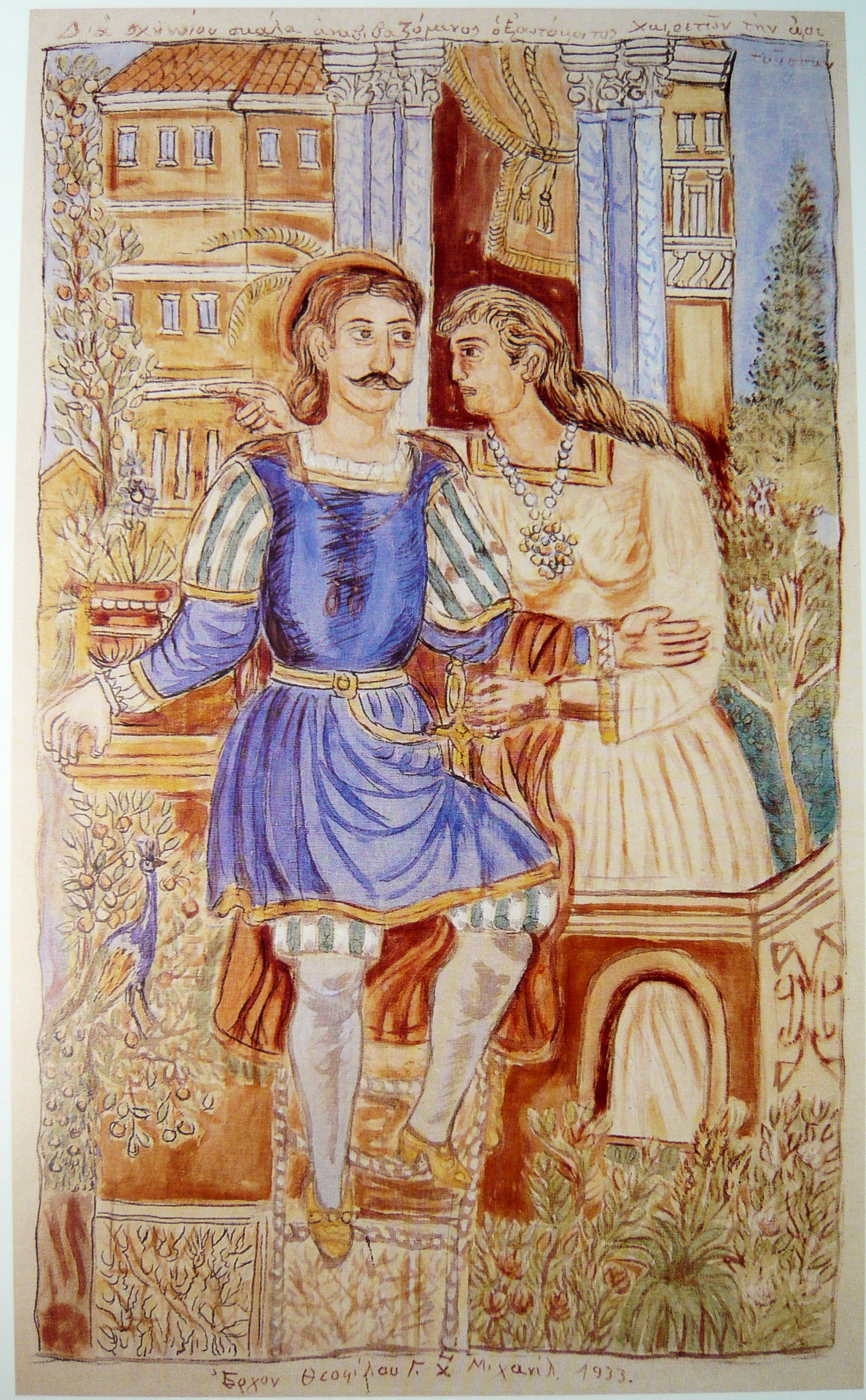
Erotokritos and Arethousa

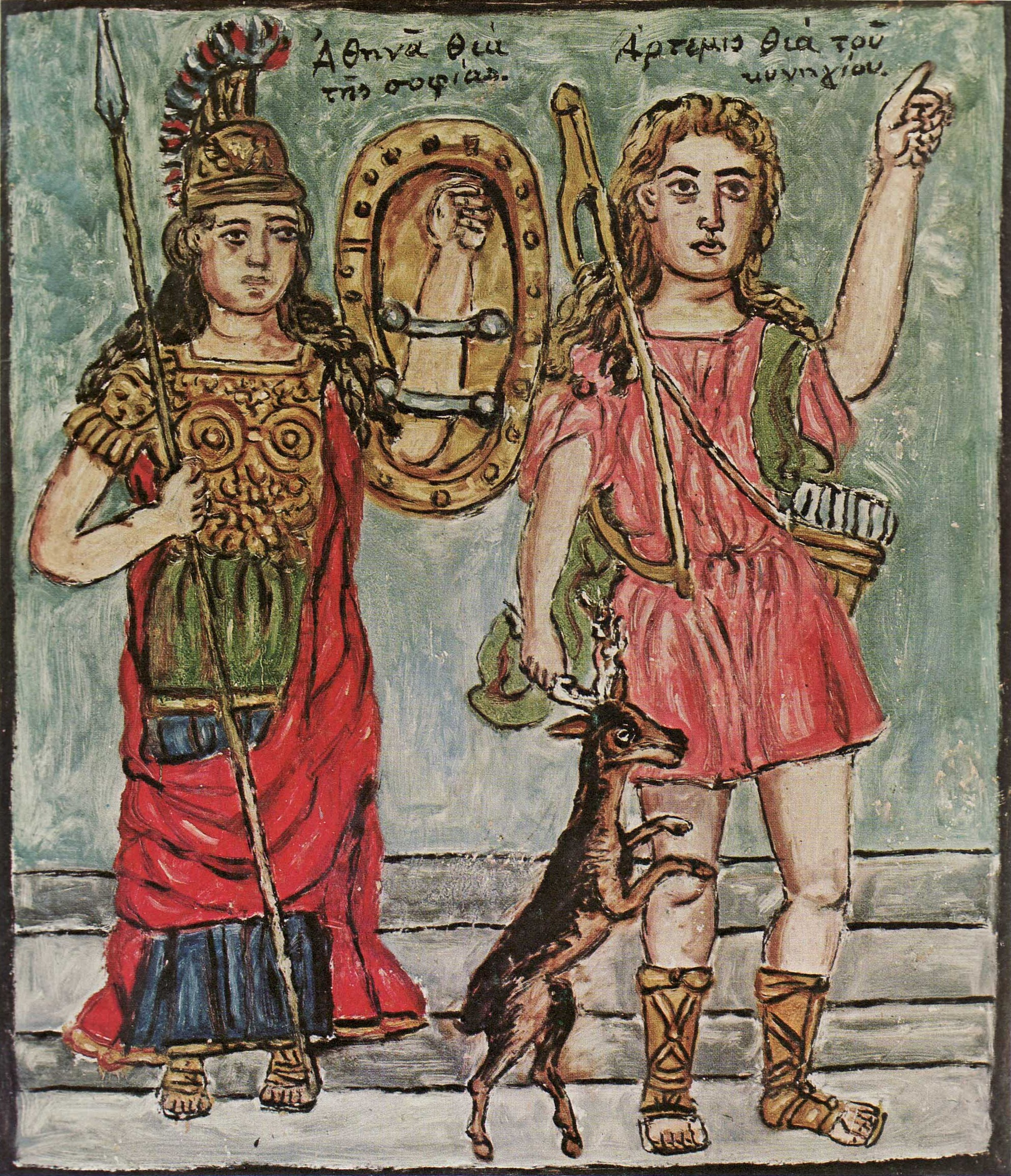
Athena and Artemis

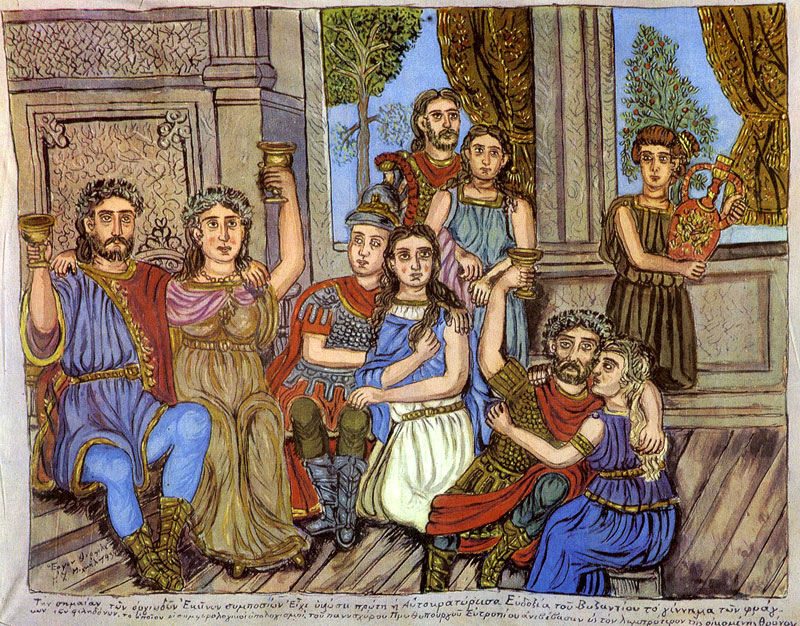
Symposium of Empress Eudoxia

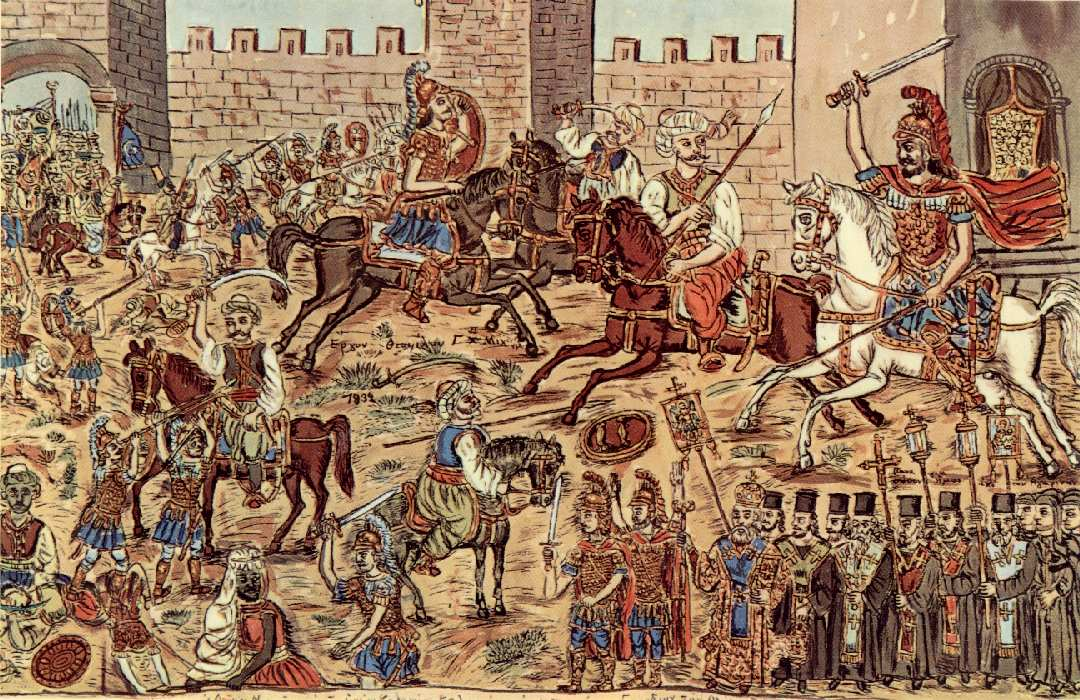
Constantine Palaiologos

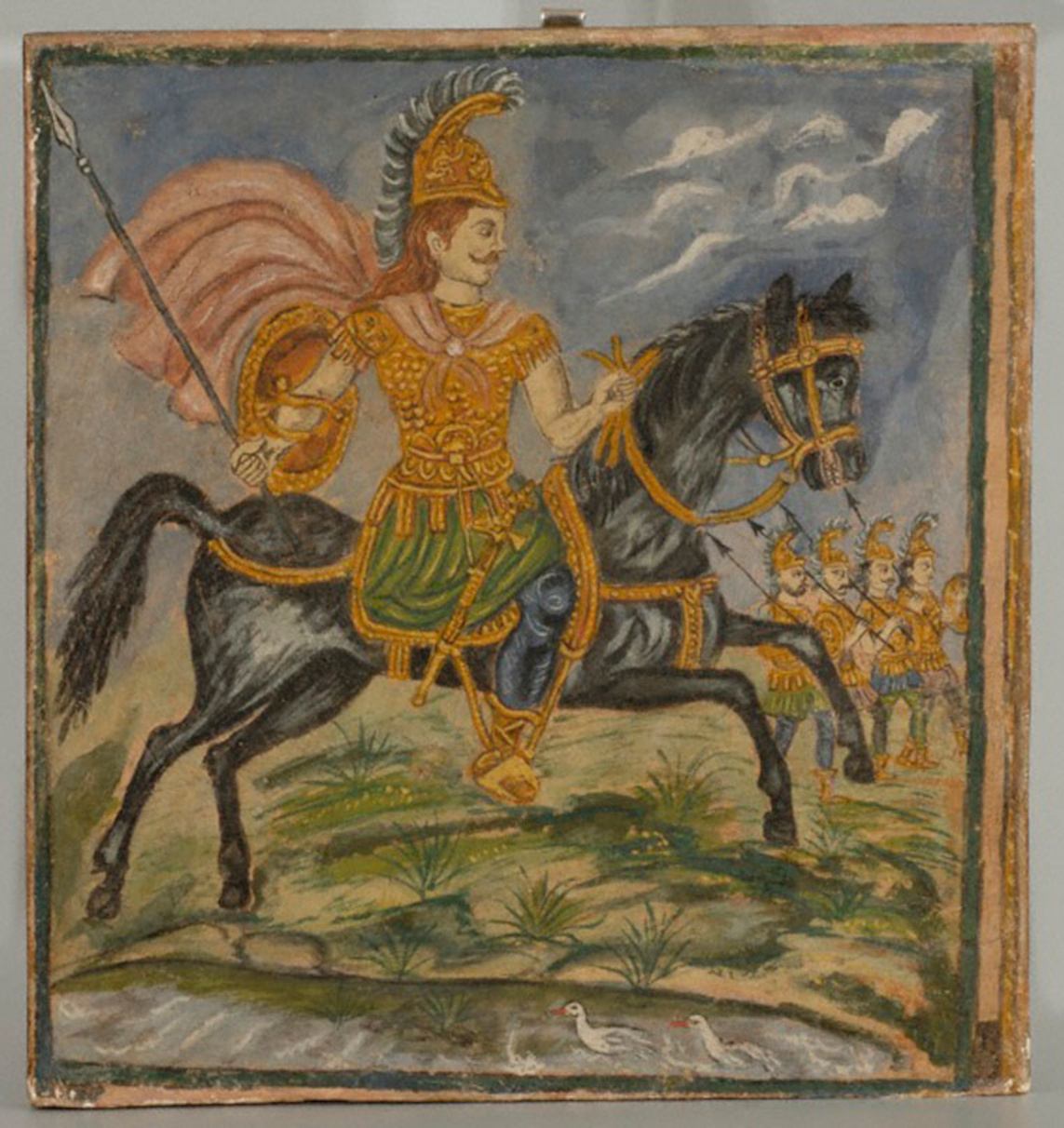
Alexander the Great

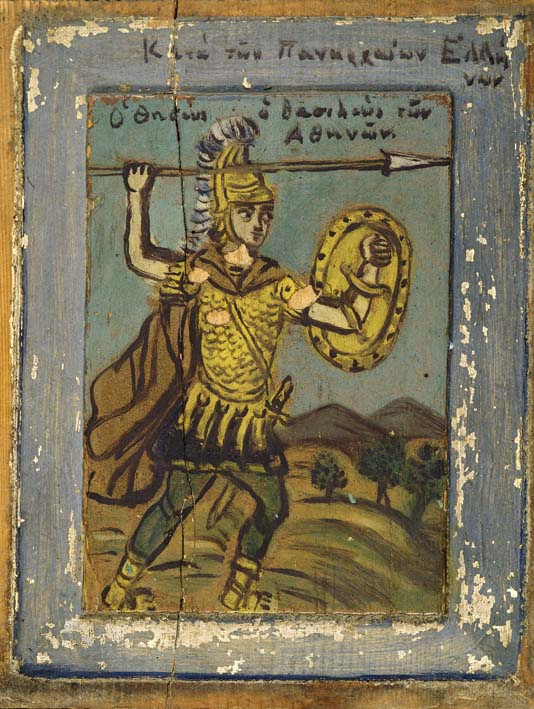
Theseus

== Sources ==
- Yannis Tsarouchis, Theophilos (Athens: The Commercial Bank of Greece, 1966).
- Odysseas Elytis, The Painter Theophilos, pub. Ypsilon, Athens 1996. ISBN 960-17-0011-0.
- Kitsos Makris, The Painter Theophilos at Pilios, 3rd εdition, εκδ. Δημοτικού Κέντρου Ιστορικών Ερευνών, Αρχείων και Εκθεμάτων Βόλου, Volos 1998. ISBN 960-85703-1-X.
- Ε. Παπαζαχαρίου, Ο άλλος Θεόφιλος, εκδ. Κάκτος, Αθήνα 1997.
- Ντ. Παπασπύρου, Θεόφιλος Γ.Χ. Μιχαήλ, εκδ. Ιανός, Θεσσαλονίκη 1998. ISBN 960-7771-16-8.
