= Cassope =

Ancient Greek city in Epirus

Coordinates: 39°08′43″N 20°40′32″E

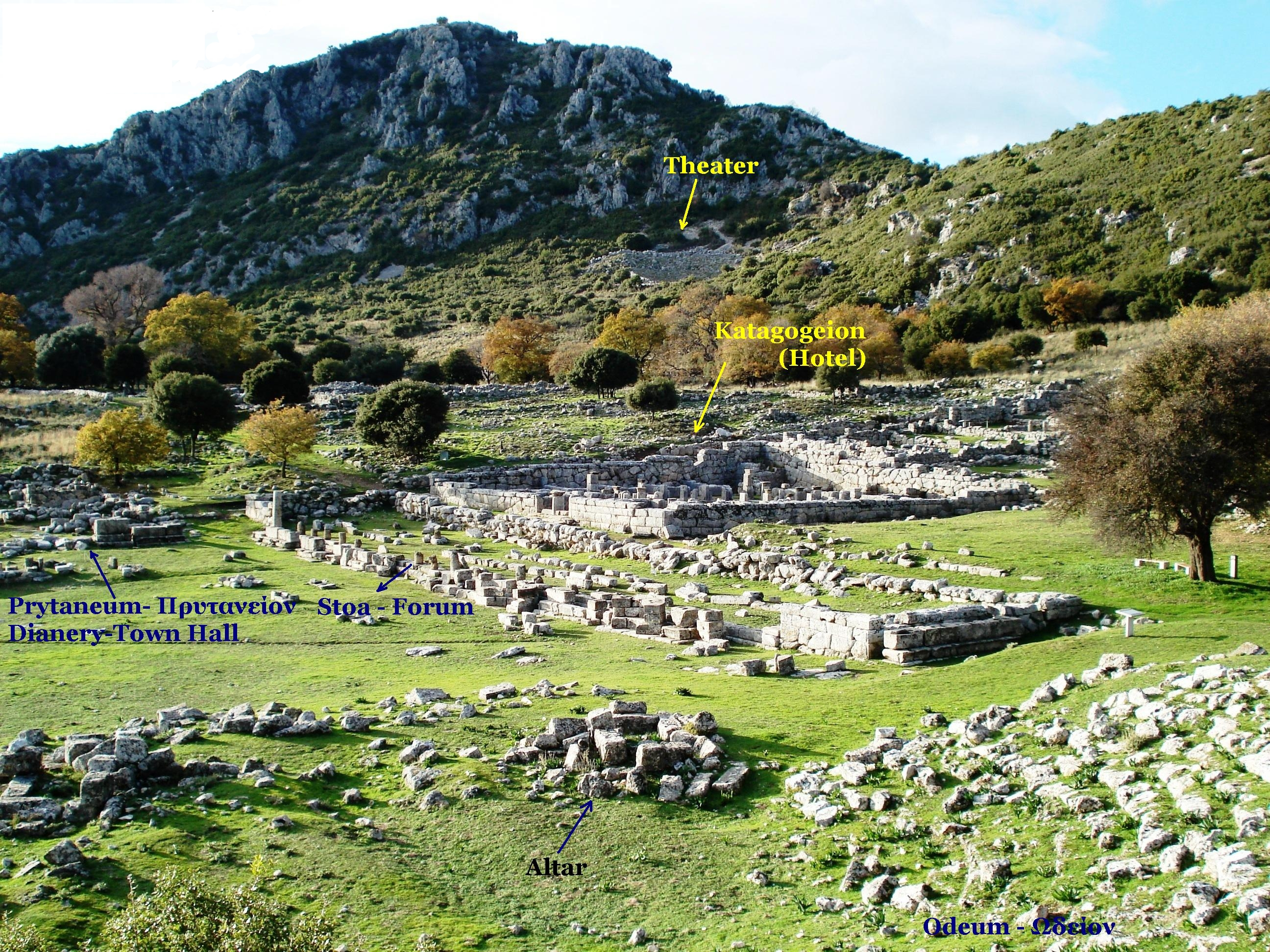
View of the site of Kassope

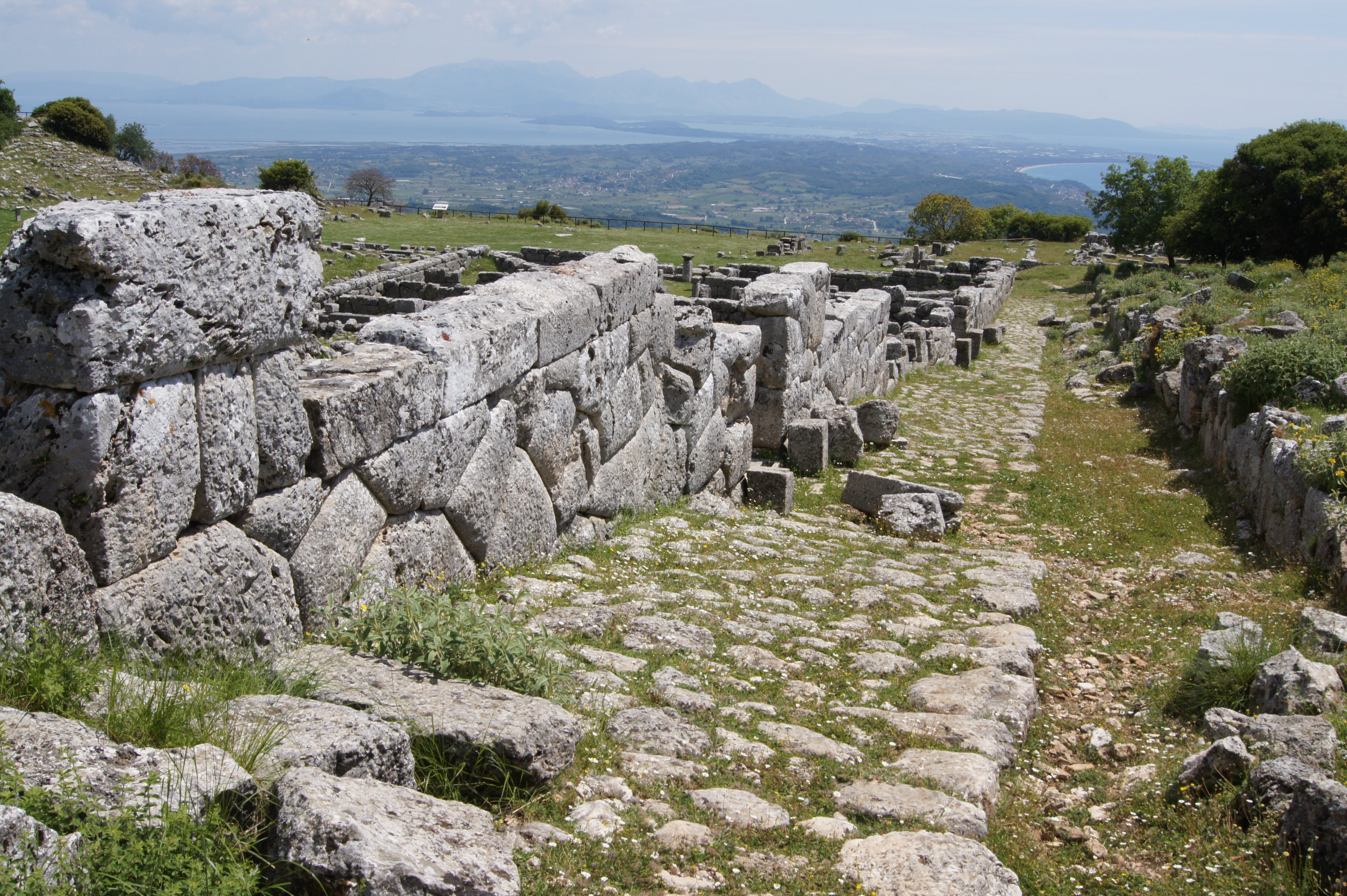
Street in Kassope and view to the south

Kassope or Cassope (Ancient Greek: Κασσώπη - Kassōpē, also Κασσωπία - Kassōpia and Κασσιόπη - Kassiopē) was an ancient Greek city in Epirus.

Kassope occupies a remote site on a high platform overlooking the sea, the Ambracian Gulf and the fertile lands to the south. The slopes of Mount Zalongo, where the Dance of Zalongo took place, are found to the north.

It is considered one of the best remaining examples of a city built on a rectilinear street grid of a Hippodamian plan in Greece.

== History ==
The first settlements on the site are from the Paleolithic. However the city of Kassope was founded in the middle of the 4th century BC as the capital of the Kassopaeans, a sub-tribe of the Thesprotians. It belonged to the Aetolian League. Cassope or Cassopia is mentioned in the war carried on by Cassander against Alcetas II of Epirus, in 312 BC. The city flourished in the 3rd century BC, when large public buildings were built. Kassope also minted its own coins.

Massively damaged by Roman forces in 168-167 BC, Kassope was abandoned in 31 B.C. when the remaining inhabitants resettled to Nikopolis, the region's new capital.

== Archaeology ==
The ruins of Kassope were visited and described by William Martin Leake in the early 19th century. Extensive excavations were performed by a Greek team under Sotiris Dakaris in 1952 and 1955, and in 1977-1983 by a team from the University of Ioannina together with the German Archaeological Institute, co-led by Dakaris, Wolfram Hoepfner, Konstantina Gravani, and Ernst-Ludwig Schwandner. The visible remains include Cyclopean walls, an agora, a theatre, civic buildings, and private houses.

== See also ==
- List of cities in ancient Epirus
