= Alexandra Paschalidou-Moreti =

Greek architect

- Αλεξάνδρα Πασχαλίδου-Μωρέτη
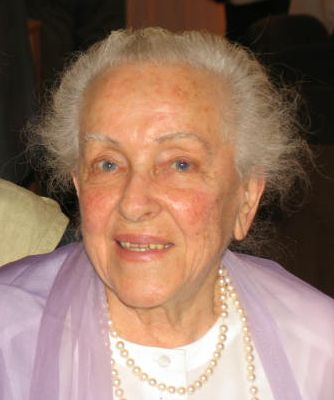
- Born: 1912; Istanbul, Ottoman Empire
- Died: 2010 (aged 97–98); Filothei, Greece
- Occupation: Architect
- Notable work: Designed pavilions for international exhibitions

Alexandra Paschalidou-Moreti, Greek: Αλεξάνδρα Πασχαλίδου-Μωρέτη (1912 in Istanbul – 2010 in Filothei), was a Greek architect who designed pavilions for numerous international exhibitions.

== Early life and education ==
Paschalidou–Moreti was the youngest daughter of Konstantinos Paschalidis and doll maker Despina Pappa. In 1922, her family moved from Istanbul to Bulgaria. Soon after, they moved to Thessaloniki before moving to Athens permanently in 1925.

Paschalidou-Moreti was raised in a middle-class social and family environment which had members who were architects and painters. Her generation (56 first cousins) produced many artists. Some of the most prominent are: the sculptor Giannis Pappas and the painters Eleni Pagkalou, Andreas Vourloumis, and Paschalidou-Moreti’s sister Eleni Paschalidou, who was the wife of sculptor George Zongolopoulos. and her sister Lili Paschalidou - Theodoridou, who was also a doll maker.

As a student, at Zappeio Girls School in Istanbul, she was influenced by an exceptionally fertile cultural environment with notable works of art which encouraged her to develop an aesthetic and artistic foundation. From a very early age Alexandra Paschalidou-Moreti began to paint and draw. When she moved to Athens she continued her studies at the First Girls Gymnasium.

In 1932, she decided to attend university and began her studies in architecture at the National Technical University of Athens. In 1936 she became the seventh woman in Greece to succeed in becoming an architect.

== Career ==
In 1936, Dimitris Pikionis, professor of National Technical University and supervisor of the project concerned with the study and the analysis of the architecture and decorative arts of Greek housing, assigned the completion of that project to a team of young architects: Dimitris Moretis, Giorgos Giannoulelis and Alexandra Paschalidou. This team studied and illustrated, for the first time in Greece, the traditional architecture as well as the house decoration of 18th and 19th centuries. The study was particularly focused on the areas of Western Macedonia, Ipiros, Thessaly, Pindos and the Cyclades. The duration of that project was two years. The collected material was first presented in 1938 at the Stratigopoulou venue and at Zappeion, however because of the Second World War, the programme had to be discontinued. In 1948 and 1949, the Greek Public Art Club, under the presidency of Natalia Pavlou Mela, published the first two volumes of the aforementioned project: the “Manor Houses of Kastoria” and the “Houses of Zagora”. Today, the vast majority of the study has been given to National History Museum of Athens, which undertook the publication of two more volumes, namely, the ”Manor Houses of Kozani” and “Manor Houses of Siatista”. In 1938, Alexandra Paschalidou-Moreti organized the Greek Pavilion at the International Exhibition of Berlin. In 1939 she married her former fellow-student, Dimitris Moretis, who was a mathematician and poet apart from architect. They had two children, Angelos and Irana, both of whom became architects.

In 1939, the Ministry of Press and Tourism assigned to Alexandra Paschalidou-Moreti and Dimitris Moretis the design of the Greek Pavilion for the New York World’s Fair. There they displayed a large wall painting of the artist Nikos Eggonopoulos. In that exhibition, as well as in other international exhibitions for which they designed pavilions, the two architects promoted notable Greek artists including Nikos Xatzikiriakos-Gkikas, Spiros Vasileiou, Gerasimos Steris, Nelly's, Voula Papaioannou.

During the Axis Occupation of Greece Alexandra Paschalidou-Moreti took part in the National Greek Resistance. At the same time, she researched and wrote studies on the National and International Exhibitions using historical documents from the Ministry of National Economy. In 1951, she worked as an architect for the General Secretariat of Tourism to facilitate and organize the reconstruction of the devastated facilities of the National Exhibition Center of Thessaloniki. In the same capacity, she visited many places in Greece where she documented and photographed destruction from the War and the German occupation. In addition Paschalidou-Moreti and Dimitris Moretis undertook studies and designed touristic installations for a variety of purposes such as hotels, hostels, hiking stations, mountain huts and spa facilities. From 1937 to 1969, the Greek government asked Dimitris and Alexandra to organize, study and direct the construction of 135 Greek Pavilions for National and International exhibitions, on four continents, in 21 countries and in 40 cities around the world.

In 1969, during the Junta Paschalidou-Moreti resigned.

From 1970 to 1976, she designed and built churches, blocks of flats, athletic centers and shops. Furthermore, she completed urban planning studies for housing (Malesina). She showed particular interest in studying the architecture of the islands of Kefalonia, Siros, Tinos, Naxos and Paros. There are two volumes of this project, containing drawings, texts and photographs at the library of the Technical Chamber of Greece.

In 1976, Paschalidou-Moreti retired.

== Sculpture and written works ==
Remaining active in her retirement, she created clay sculptures and other artefacts in brass. Furthermore, in her early 90s, she showed an exceptional talent in managing drawing programs on the computer.

Alexandra Paschalidou-Moreti published articles and studies concerned with Public Art, interior design and National and International Exhibitions. She gave numerous lectures in Greece and abroad. In addition, she gave many interviews in the media (press, radio, television) primarily concerning the role of women and Greek architecture, both new and traditional.

== Awards and affiliations ==
From 2006 until her death in 2010, Alexandra Paschalidou-Moreti was vice president of the George Zongolopoulos Foundation.

Alexandra Paschalidou-Moreti received the Award of the Universal Exhibition of Berlin in 1938 and was made an “Honorary Citizen of the State of New York” in 1939. Furthermore, she obtained the Prize of the International Exhibition of Thessaloniki in 1950. Finally, the state of Greece awarded her the Prize of National Resistance. For her overall work, she received awards from the City of Athens in 1996. She also received awards from the Organization of Women Engineers in 2000 and in 2007.

Alexandra Paschalidou-Moreti was a member of the Architecture Department of the Greek Technical Chamber and the Architects Club, the Architectural Company, the International Union of Architects/ U.I.A. / MOUVEMENT EUROPEEN / Greek National Council/ SOCIETE EUROPEENNE DE CULTURE / Venice. Moreover, she was a board member of many management councils for organizations such as Y.W.C.A Greece, Professional Women’s Club, Literature and Arts Club, Friends of Athens Club. She was fluent in three foreign languages: French, English and Italian. The documents and files of Dimitris Moretis and Alexandra Paschalidou-Moreti are kept by their children. Part of the material can be found in the National History Museum of Athens, in the Greek Literature and History Archives, as well as in the Benaki Museum.
