= Outdoor Sculpture Gallery of Psychiko =

Sculpture garden in Athens, Greece

Coordinates: 38.0104°N 23.7705°E

The Open Air Glyptotheque located at George Zongolopoulos Square (Greek: Υπαίθρια Γλυπτοθήκη Ψυχικού), is a glyptotheque (or sculpture garden) located in Psychiko, Athens, Greece.

The sculpture garden was established in 2010 when the Municipality of Filothei-Psychiko wished to honor the Greek sculptor George Zongolopoulos by giving his name to one of the municipality's central squares. The George Zongolopoulos Foundation, also based in Psychiko, created an open-air glyptotheque freely accessible to the public for the square.

Zongolopoulos and his wife, the painter Eleni Paschalidou-Zongolopoulou, were amongst the first residents of Psychiko. They lived and created together for about six decades in their residence and studio on a street near this square.

There are six large-scale sculptures by Zongolopoulos in Psychiko, as well as Umbrellas at the entrance of Psychiko on Kifissias Avenue. The sculptures in the square are representative of his different creative periods and include Alexander, Poseidon, Sculpture of TITF (Thessaloniki International Trade Fair), Olympic Circles, Column and Irana.
