= Lili Paschalidou-Theodoridou =

- Born: 1911; Istanbul (Constantinople)
- Died: 1975 (aged 63–64); Athens
- Occupation: Doll maker
- Years active: 1948–1970
- Notable work: Her dolls at Benaki Toy Museum in Athens, Greece
- Spouse: Georgios (Yura) Theodoridis (married 1934–1948)
- Children: 2
- Parent(s): Constantinos Paschalidis & Despina Pappa-Paschalidou

Lili (Julia) Paschalidou-Theodoridou (Greek: Λίλη Πασχαλίδου-Θεοδωρίδου; Constantinople, 1911 – Athens, 1975) was a Greek doll maker.

== Biography ==
Paschalidou was born in Constantinople (now Istanbul) in 1911 and she was the daughter of Constantine Paschalidis, a businessman, and Despina Pappa, a doll maker. Her sisters were Eleni Paschalidou-Zongolopoulou, Danae Pascalidou-Nikolaidi and Alexandra Paschalidou-Moreti. In 1922 her family left Istanbul having as an initial station Varna in Bulgaria, then Thessaloniki and finally Athens, where they settled permanently in 1925.

Her family had a long tradition in the field of Arts and letters. Her own generation (56 first cousins) had many artists, the most famous of whom are the sculptor Giannis Pappas, the painter Eleni Pangalou, the painter Andreas Vourloumis, as well as the painter Helen Paschalidou, Lili' s sister and later wife of the sculptor George Zongolopoulos.

Lili' s appeal to painting and craftsmanship is evident from an early age, after all, painting and handicrafts were, among other things, the field of professional activity of her mother, Despina Pappa-Paschalidou. Lili, as a student of the Zappeion Girl' s School of Constantinople, is early in an imposing environment with important works of art available for the immediate and continuous cultivation of her aesthetics. Her education includes learning French and English, while her sports activities include tennis, which she develops by participating in tennis clubs in Athens.

In 1934 she married Georgios (Yura) Theodoridis, with whom she had two children.

Painting continues to be a part of her amateur occupation, while her talent and skill in handicrafts will be valuable help for her later professional career.

== Doll workshop ==
In 1948, after the sudden death of her husband, Lilι was professionally involved in making dolls with the support of her mother, Despina Pappa-Paschalidou, who used to be a prominent dollmaker during the Interwar period (she owned a workshop for handmade dolls in Athens, in the operation of which Lili herself had contributed). The new workshop was also in Nea Smyrni, Athens, and employed two more women, refugees from Asia Minor, one of whom was Lili' s mother's former colleague. Lili Paschalidou-Theodoridou standardizes two doll sizes and makes the lower part of their legs lead with pencil so that they stand better. She makes handmade dolls which she dresses with Greek local costumes that she designs, sews and embroiders on her own. For the faces of her creations she uses molds especially made for her by the sculptor George Zongolopoulos.

She receives a special research permit from Antonis Benakis to study and capture the various traditional costumes kept at the Benaki Museum. She accurately designs embroidered designs, ornamented headbands and is persistently looking for fabrics and materials so that the museum's authentic costumes can be rendered with the greatest possible reliability in her dolls. She uses traditional techniques combining knitting and hand embroidery for embroidery patterns and manual machines for the technical parts.

She finally reproduces 36 authentic traditional costumes in miniature, women's and men's, from various regions of Greece with which she dresses her handmade dolls.

== Collaborations and exhibitions ==
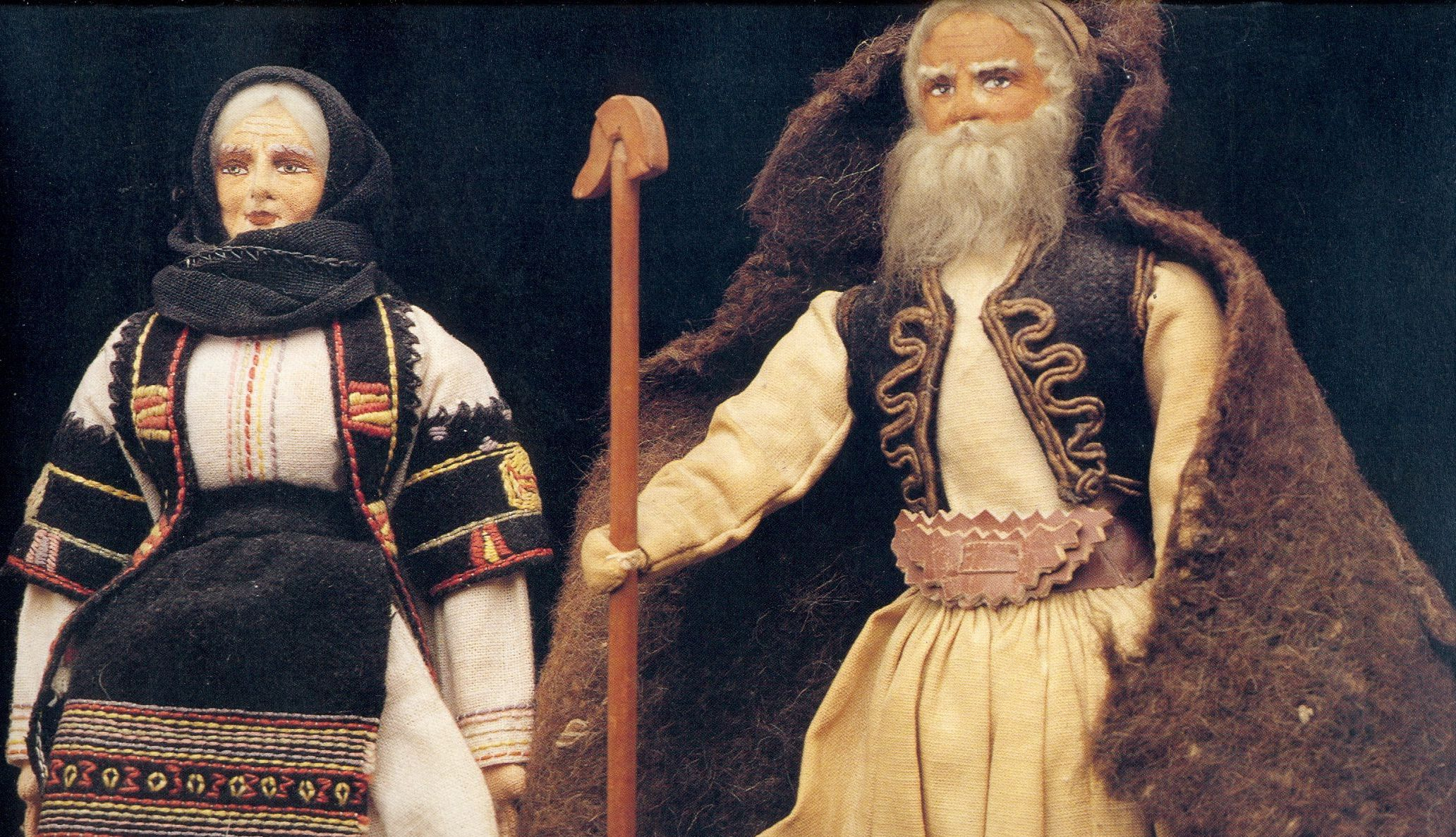
Greek regional costume dolls by Lili Theodoridou, hereby Vlacha & Vlachos dolls

In 1949, Lili's dolls attracted the interest of the Royal Welfare Foundation, with which she began a collaboration that would last for twenty years. The famous Greek folklorist Angeliki Hatzimichali appreciated Lili' s work and included her dolls in the Greek folk art store she maintained at the Grande Britagne Hotel on Panepistimiou Street in the centre of Athens. Also, Lili had a close cooperation with organizations such as the Hellenic Handicrafts Organization (later EOMMEX) and the well-known tourist store of that era entitled "Hellenic Folk Art" with exceptional Greek souvenirs on Voukourestiou Street in Athens.

Lili also collaborates with the National Tobacco Organization, for which she dresses her dolls in costumes from tobacco-producing areas of Greece. Through this collaboration, her dolls travel to International Exhibitions and in the late 1950s they were awarded at the Melbourne International Fair. In 1970 she stopped working, putting an end to the operation of her workshop.

She died in 1975 in Athens.

== Lili's dolls ==
In 2017, the Benaki Museum inaugurated the Benaki Toy Museum in Faliro, Athens.

Part of the work of Lili Paschalidou-Theodoridou belongs to the Benaki Museum [Toy Museum] and is presented in the Permanent Collection of Toys, and in private collections as well.

== Bibliography ==
- Argyriadi, Maria (1991). Dolls in Greek life and art from antiquity to the present day. Athens: Lousis Bratziotis. p. 110, 158, 161. ISBN 960-7294-06-8
