= Despina Pappa-Paschalidou =

Greek doll maker

Despina Pappa-Paschalidou (Kadıköy, 1874 – Athens, 1954) was a Greek doll maker.

== Biography ==
Despina Pappa - Paschalidou
- Born: 1874; Kadikoy
- Died: 1954 (aged 79–80); Athens
- Occupation: Doll maker
- Years active: 1923-1940
- Spouse: Constantinos Paschalidis
- Children: Helen Paschalidou - Zongolopoulou Danae Paschalidou - Nikolaidi Alexandra Paschalidou - Moreti
- Parent(s): Georgios Pappas & Eleni Logaridou

Despina Pappa-Paschalidou was born in 1874 in Chalcedon (Kadıköy). Her father, Georgios Pappas, was a merchant from the island of Chios and owner of one of the biggest shops in Constantinople (Galata), founded in 1852, which sold felt and fabric. Her mother, Eleni Logaridou, was born in Fanari (Fener). She was raised in a large, prosperous, urban family. Despina was privately educated at home and her studies included Greek, French and piano. She also showed interest and skills in drawing, frequently inspired by the landscapes that were depicted on postcards.

In 1897 she married Konstantinos Paschalidis, a businessman who had studied at the School of Agriculture of the University of Montpellier and with whom she had four daughters: Eleni (Paschalidou - Zongolopoulou), Danae (Paschalidou - Nikolaidi), Lili (Paschalidou - Theodoridou), and Alexandra (Paschalidou - Moreti).

Konstantinos Paschalidis owned a sericulture business in silkworm cocoons and silk seeds. His businesses were located in Redestos (East Thraki), in Kios (Asia Minor) and in Teheran (Persia). He was a pioneer since he was the first to make use of the Pasteur method and microscopic examination of the butterflies. His successful business was interrupted in 1919 after the Russian Revolution because the main roads which enabled trade to Europe were closed. Paschalidis will close his factory in Persia, while a characteristic fact about his business took place in Baku, Azerbaijan, where an entire railway that transferred the yearly production of his factory in Teheran, silkworm cocoons and silk seeds, was seized. That fact had a considerable economic impact for Paschalidis.

In 1922 the Paschalidis family moved from Constantinople (Istanbul) to Bulgaria (Varna), then to Thessaloniki and finally to Athens in 1925, where they settled permanently, and at this point most likely began Despina Paschalidou's motivation for financial independence.

== Handmade dolls ==
In the mid-20s, Despina Paschalidou decided to make dolls in order to earn some money. She designed both the dolls and their clothing which was inspired mainly by Greek costumes. Despina sold her dolls in touristic shops near the Acropolis. In 1930 she participated with her crafts in the Industrial Exhibition of Delphi. Despina' s dolls were also presented at the Annual Exhibition of Traditional Art at Zappeio. She co-operated professionally with the first touristic shop in Greece, owned by Florentini Kaloutsi.

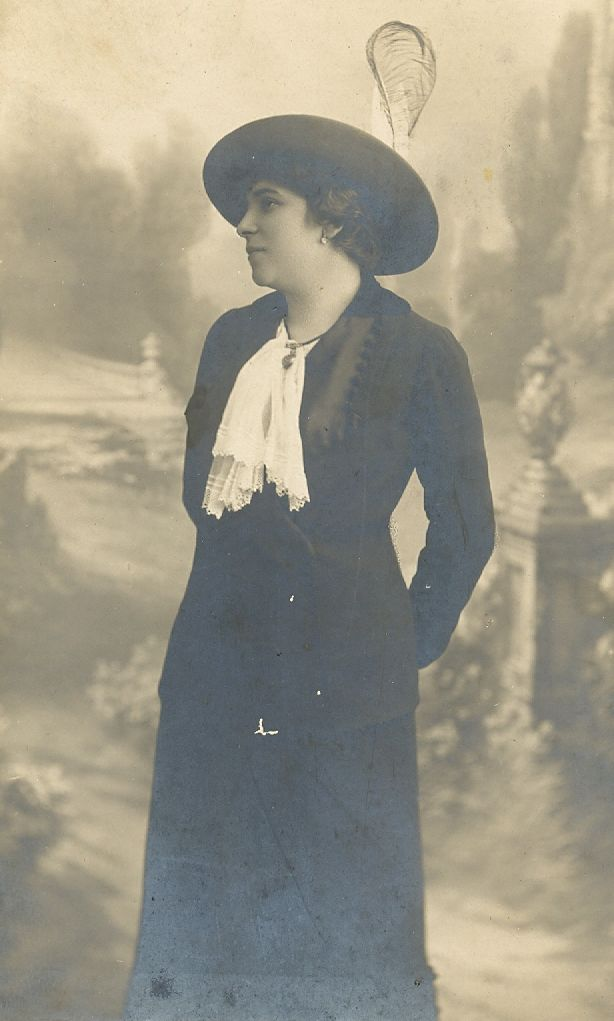
Despina Pappa - Paschalidou, 1920

The dolls were dressed in traditional clothes from different parts of Greece and Anatolia as well as urban dress. Despina's inspiration derived from everyday people of Athens’ life such as a tavern boy, a shoemaker, a baker, etc. Often her dolls would illustrate comical and funny features of people, such as the “Menidiatis”, holding a spit of meat, and the “Delapatridis”. Moreover, one of the Greek ministers ordered an oversized doll named “Othonas” and offered it as a present to the Prime Minister of Greece, Eleftherios Venizelos.

In 1934, Despina Paschalidou, now a prominent doll maker, decided to create a workshop in her house and eventually hired ten women, all of them refugees from Asia Minor, to work for her business. This workshop also produced dolls without clothes that were exported to the American Near East Foundation. The workshop developed successfully for five years until circumstances during World War II did not allow further operation.

After the production and trade of dolls, Despina Paschalidou turned to writing down and illustrating the tales from Constantinople that her aunt, Chariklia Pappa, used to tell her as a child. In 1939 Pirsos Publications printed her work with the title “Tales of Our People”.

Privately she continued making dolls, put on puppet shows with her grandchildren, painted, and noted recipes and traditions of her home country. It was Despina who urged her daughter Lili Paschalidou - Theodoridou to get involved with the craft of doll making in 1948-9 and who inspired her daughter Eleni Paschalidou – Zongolopoulou to study the art of drawing.

She died in 1954, in Athens.

A part of Despina Pappa-Paschalidou’ s work is held in the Benaki Museum in the museum's Permanent Collection of Toys and Childhood, as well as in several private collections.

Despina's daughter, Alexandra Paschalidou-Moreti, reissued the tales of her mother in 1990 and 2000 titled “Tales of Constantinople”.

== Bibliography ==
- Pappa - Paschalidou, Despina (1939). Tales from Constantinople. Athens: Pyrsos.
- Argyriadi, Maria (1991). Dolls in Greek life and art from antiquity to the present day. Athens: 1991.
- Pappa - Paschalidou, Despina (2000). Tales from Constantinople. Athens: Optima '92 Editions.
