= Glyptotheque (Zagreb) =

Art museum in Zagreb, Croatia

Croatian Academy of Sciences and Arts Glyptotheque
- HAZU Gliptoteka
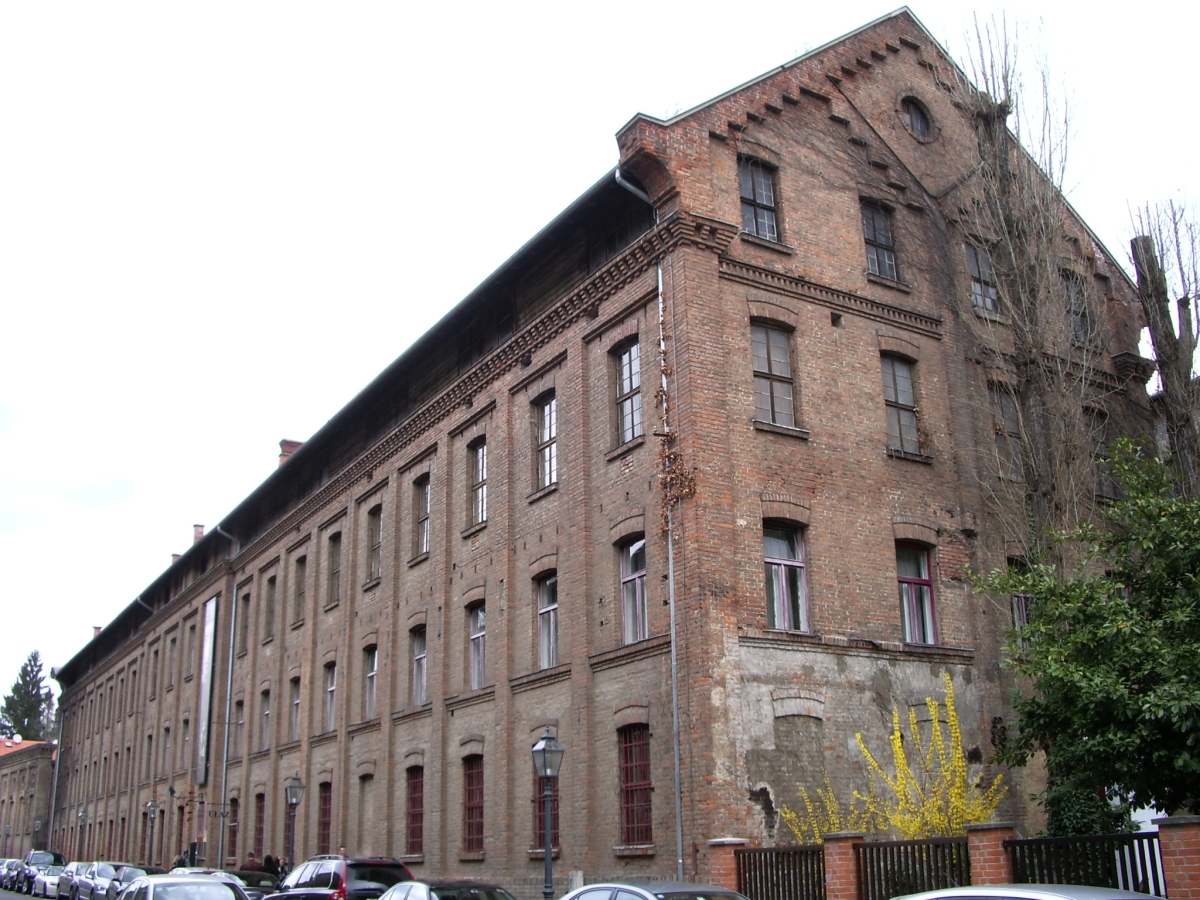
- Museum building
- Established: 1937
- Location: Zagreb, Croatia
- Coordinates: 45°49′20″N 15°58′38″E
- Type: Glyptotheque
- Website: gliptoteka.mdc.hr

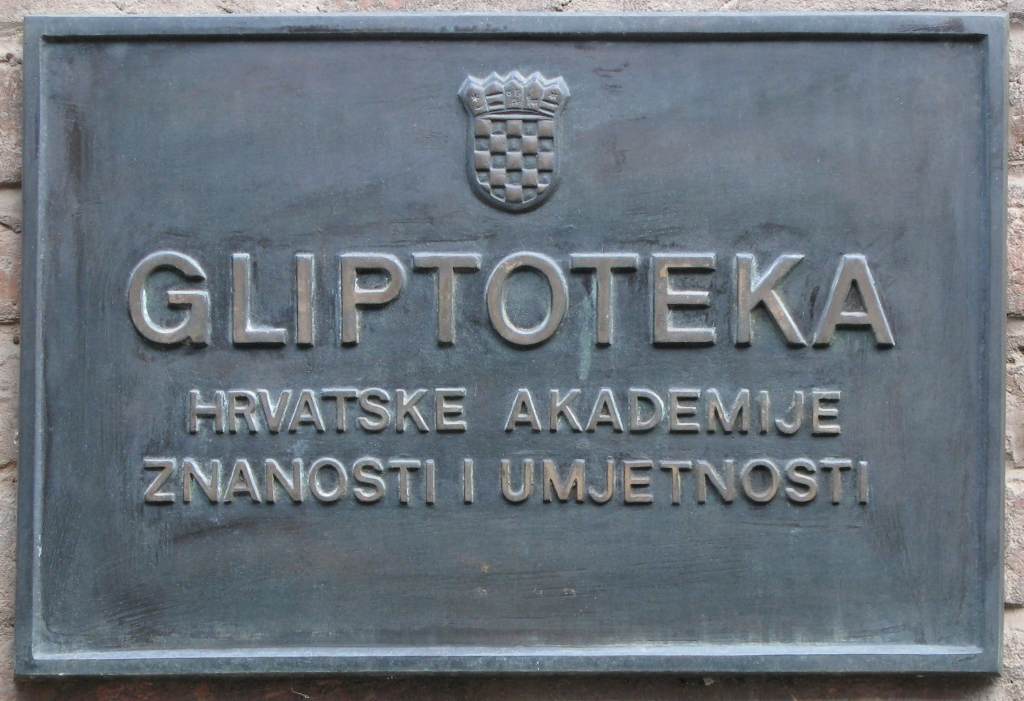
The museum plaque

Glyptotheque of the Croatian Academy of Sciences and Arts (Croatian: Gliptoteka HAZU) is an art gallery in the center of Zagreb, Croatia. It is located on Medvedgradska Street near Tkalčićeva Street within the Gornji Grad - Medveščak administrative district.
