= Eleni Paschalidou-Zongolopoulou =

Greek artist (1909–1991)

Eleni Paschalidou - Zongolopoulou
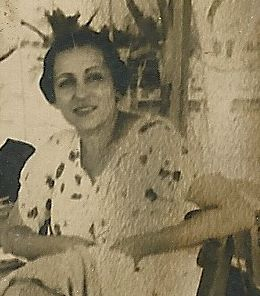
- Paschalidou - Zongolopoulou in the '30s
- Born: Eleni Paschalidou; 1909; Istanbul, Ottoman Empire
- Died: 1991 (aged 81–82); Athens, Greece
- Known for: painter
- Spouse: George Zongolopoulos (1936 - 1991)

Eleni Zongolopoulou (née Paschalidou, Istanbul, 1909 – Athens, 1991) was a Greek painter. During her artistic career she followed the movements of Expressionism, Fauvism, Cubism and Abstract art. She was wife of the sculptor George Zongolopoulos.

== Childhood and education ==
She was born in 1909 in Moda, a neighbourhood of Kadıköy, Istanbul. Her father, Konstantinos Paschalidis, was a businessman and her mother, Despina Pappa - Paschalidou, was a doll maker. She was brought up in an bourgeoisie family environment with her sisters Danae Nikolaidi, Lili Paschalidou-Theodoridou, and Alexandra Paschalidou-Moreti. She attended the Zappeion School for Girls and by the time she completed her Gymnasium studies she had already decided to follow a career as a professional painter. She also learned three foreign languages (French, Italian and English).

In 1922 her family left Istanbul and moved first to Bulgaria, then soon after to Thessaloniki and finally to Athens, where they settled permanently in 1925. In 1928, she enrolled in the Athens School of Fine Arts where she studied drawing under the famous Greek painter Konstantinos Parthenis.

In 1933 Paschalidou met Giorgos Zongolopoulos, a sculptor from Athens and friend of her teacher, Parthenis. They were married in 1936 and lived together in the Athenian suburb of Psychiko until Eleni's death in 1991. According to Zongolopoulos himself, Eleni was the most important thing I've had in the world. Although the couple was married for almost 60 years they were childless by their own choice.

== Career ==
In 1933 Zongolopoulou participated in a group exhibition along with other fellow students from the ASFA including Yiannis Moralis and Lazaros Lameras. Three years after, she participated at the sixth exhibition of the art group Ομάδα Τέχνη (Group Art), which was founded for the promotion of modernism in Greek art. The same year she took part in the International Exposition of Paris where she was awarded with the silver medal. During her stay in Paris she examined El Greco’s paintings and she was deeply influenced by Pablo Picasso’s work, which led her toward creative abstractivism. In 1939 she took part in the International Exhibition of New York, where she was honoured for her participation as a member of the Greek pavilion.

In 1949 she moved to France with her husband and she studied at André Lhote’s School in Paris. Her first individual exhibition was held at "Romvos" Gallery in Athens, in 1951. Two years later she received a scholarship from the Greek National Scholarships Foundation and thus she continued her studies in drawing in the Accademia di Belle Arti di Firenze. She also made educational travels in Spain, England and France. During that period Paschalidou - Zongolopoulou focused on abstract and aniconic drawings. In 1973 Zongolopoulos couple bought a studio in Paris in order to live in the center of contemporary art trends as well as to closely follow the movements in the Arts.

Paschalidou-Zongolopoulou participated in all the Pan-Hellenic Exhibitions up to 1965. She also took part in solo as well as group exhibitions until 1986. She was an active member of the Société Européenne de Culture in Venice from 1956 as well as a teacher of younger Greek artists like Kostas Paniaras. Her works can be found in many private and public collections in Greece, Europe, U.S.A. and Israel. Indicatively in Greece her works are at the Athens Public Library, the Ministry of Education, the National Bank of Greece, and the Vorres Museum. Some of her most important art works in Greece are her wall paintings for the railway station of Korinthos (1955) and for the Medical School of the University of Athens (1961).

She died on February 16, 1991, in Athens.

== Individual exhibitions ==
- 1951 "Romvos" Gallery, Athens.
- 1955 "Ilissos" Venue, Athens.
- 1962 Doxiadis Institute.
- 1962 Macedonian Art Company "Art", Thessaloniki.
- 1962 Athens Technological Institute.
- 1964 «Il Canale» Gallery, Venice.
- 1966 «Motte» Gallery, Paris.
- 1969 Venue Κ.Τ.Ε. (Centre of Technological Applications), Athens.
- 1976 "Charitos" Gallery, Athens.
- 1977 «Motte» Gallery, Geneva.
- 1981 "Nees Morfes" Gallery, Athens.
- 1987 Art Venue "Epipeda".

== Participation in exhibitions ==
- 1937 6th Exhibition "Omas Art", Art pavilion, National Exhibition of Thessaloniki, Thessaloniki.
- 1940 Venue of Arts and Culture, Athens.
- 1946 Stockholm.
- 1947 London.
- 1955 Cairo Art Biennale.
- 1955 International Exhibition of Alexandria, Egypt.
- 1958 French Institute, Athens.
- 1958 Collective Exhibition in U.S.A.
- 1959 Creuse Gallery, Paris.
- 1961 «Nees Morfes» Gallery, Athens.
- 1962 Besabel Museum, Jerusalem.
- 1962 «Zigos» Gallery, Athens.
- 1963 National Museum of Moscow.
- 1964 Antwerp.
- 1964 Tunis.
- 1966 Greek-American Union, Athens.
- 1968 Athens Art Venue Hilton.
- 1974 Salon des Réalités Nouvelles, Paris.
- 1975 «Numera» Gallery, Venice.
- 1977 Fiamma Vico Gallery, Venice.
- 1980 Biennale Cairo.
- 1981 SIST, Athens.
- 1982 Comparaisons, Grand Palais, Paris.
- 1982 Audiovisuel, Paris.
- 1982 Art Venue «Epipeda», Athens.
- 1982 Mantes la Jolie, Paris.
- 1984 Comparaisons, Grand Palais, Paris.
- 1985 Audiovisuel, Paris.
- 1985 Mantes la Jolie, Paris.
- 1986 Comparaisons, Grand Palais, Paris.
- 1986 Salon de Mai, Grand Palais, Paris.
