= Psychiko =

Psychiko Ψυχικό
- Municipal unit
- Location within North Athens regional unit

- Location within Greece
- Coordinates: 38°1′N 23°46′E
- Country: Greece
- Administrative region: Attica
- Regional unit: North Athens
- Municipality: Filothei-Psychiko

Area
  - Municipal unit: 2.776 km^{2} (1.072 sq mi)
- Elevation: 190 m (620 ft)

Population (2021)
  - Municipal unit: 9,595
  - Municipal unit density: 3,456/km^{2} (8,952/sq mi)
- Time zone: UTC+2 (EET)
  - Summer (DST): UTC+3 (EEST)
- Postal code: 154 52
- Area code: 21067
- Vehicle registration: Z
- Website: www.psychiko.gr

Psychiko (Greek: Ψυχικό [psiçiˈko]) is a town and a suburb in the Athens agglomeration, Greece. Since the 2011 local government reform it is part of the municipality Filothei-Psychiko, of which it is the seat and a municipal unit. The municipality has an area of 2.776 km^{2} (1.072 sq mi).

== Overview ==
Psychiko is located 5 km northeast of Athens city centre. It is a strictly residential suburb of Athens, with commercial businesses allowed only within two small designated zones, the "Nea Agora" (New Market) and the "Palaia Agora" (Old Market), with current regulations also restricting buildings to full detachment, and a maximum of 3 floors. Psychiko was historically the home of aristocrats, members of the Greek royal family, and generally old money people. The area remains one of the wealthiest suburbs of Athens, with very high land value, and a number of embassies, particularly of rich Middle Eastern countries, to be found located in Psychiko, and neighbouring Filothei.

This was once home to Queen Frederica of the Hellenes, until the military coup d'état of 1967. Andreas Papandreou and his wife Margaret also lived in Psychiko before the dictatorship. Later, when he became Prime Minister he left Psychiko and moved to Ekali. In recent decades however, many prominent families choose to build their houses in the southern, seaside suburbs, like Glyfada or Vouliagmeni. A number of private schools are located in Psychiko: Athens College and Psychiko College, Moraitis School, the Arsakeio, and the Varvakeio.

== Name ==
The name literally means "an act of charity". A popular legend about the battle of Marathon and the Marathon run was recorded by Andreas Karkavitsas in the 19th century, and also by Linos Politis.

On the plain of Marathon a major battle was once fought; Persians with large fleets came to enslave the land and from there pass to Athens...the blood turned to a river, and reached from the roots of Vranas to Marathon on the other side; it met the sea and painted the waves red. Much lamentation and evil took place. Finally the Greeks won... and two men ran to bring the news to Athens; one travelled on horseback and the other on foot in full gear. The rider headed towards Chalandri and the messenger of foot towards Stamata; swift-footed he ascended Aforesmos and down towards the village. As women saw him, they ran towards him:

"Stop", they shouted, wanting to know the outcome of the battle. He stopped a moment to catch his breath and then took the road again. Finally, he reached Psychiko; there he was almost near death, his feet were shaking, he felt like falling down. But he composed himself, took a deep breath, continued, and finally reached Athens.

"We won," he said, and immediately fell down dead. The rider had yet to come. But there where the foot runner stopped and took a breath his act was recorded. The first village remained a 'stop' (Stamata) and the second Psychiko.

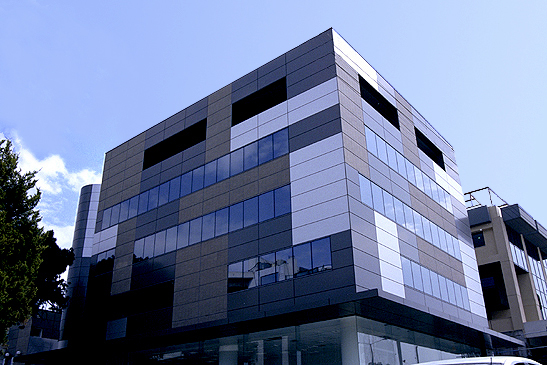
Office, stores and open air cinema building in Psychiko

== Historical population ==
Year	Population
1981	10,775
1991	10,592
2001	10,901
2011	9,529
2021	9,595

== Politics ==
Psychiko is traditionally conservative, rooting for New Democracy in all elections since the Metapolitefsi.

Parliamentary election results since 2000
6/2023	5/2023	2019	9/2015	1/2015	
1. ND 73.30%; 2. SYRIZA 7.25%; 3. KKE 3.86%; 4. PASOK 3.63%; 5. MERA25 3.14%; 6. Victory 1.77%; 7. Spartans 1.64%; 8. EL 1.50%; 9. PE 1.47%; 10. Others 2.44%	1. ND 72.05%; 2. SYRIZA 8.64%; 3. KKE 3.70%; 4. PASOK 3.58%; 5. MERA25 2.84%; 6. EL 1.60%; 7. PE 1.55%; 8. Victory 1.35%; 9. Others 4.69%	1. ND 75.98%; 2. SYRIZA 10.76%; 3. MERA25 3.65%; 4. KKE 2.42%; 5. PASOK 2.33%; 6. XA 1.22%; 7. Others 3.64%	1. ND 60.62%; 2. SYRIZA 13.07%; 3. River 11.20%; 4. XA 3.08%; 5. EK 2.32%; 6. PASOK 2.20%; 7. KKE 2.02%; 8. LAE 1.69%; 9. ANEL 1.60%; 10. Others 2.20%	1. ND 55.14%; 2. SYRIZA 14.85%; 3. River 13.57%; 4. XA 4.12%; 5. ANEL 2.54%; 6. PASOK 2.33%; 7. KKE 2.18%; 8. EK 1.36%; 9. KIDISO 1.33%; 10. Others 2.58%	
6/2012	5/2012	2009	2007	2004	2000
1. ND 58.36%; 2. SYRIZA 11.80%; 3. DIMAR 7.20%; 4. DIXA 5.65%; 5. PASOK 5.20%; 6. ANEL 3.74%; 7. XA 3.67%; 8. LAOS 1.24%; 9. KKE 1.22%; 10. Others 1.92%	1. ND 22.43%; 2. Action 22.28%; 3. SYRIZA 8.76%; 4. DIXA 8.17%; 5. PASOK 7.73%; 6. ANEL 6.07%; 7. DIMAR 4.93%; 8. XA 4.86%; 9. DISY 4.55%; 10. LAOS 2.27%; 11. OP 2.23%; 12. KKE 2.09%; 13. Others 3.63%	1. ND 46.73%; 2. PASOK 23.06%; 3. OP 8.05%; 4. LAOS 8.04%; 5. SYRIZA 7.40%; 6. KKE 3.51%; 7. Others 3.21%	1. ND 59.27%; 2. PASOK 17.05%; 3. SYRIZA 9.17%; 4. LAOS 4.73%; 5. KKE 4.01%; 6. OP 3.53%; 7. Others 2.24%	1. ND 63.06%; 2. PASOK 23.28%; 3. SYRIZA 6.54%; 4. KKE 2.71%; 5. LAOS 2.50%; 6. DIKKI 1.02%; 7. Others 0.89%	1. ND 54.30%; 2. PASOK 34.40%; 3. Coalition 5.57%; 4. KKE 2.30%; 5. DIKKI 1.07%; 6. Others 2.36%

European Parliament election results since 1999
2024	2019	2014	2009	2004	1999
1. ND 58.36%; 2. SYRIZA 6.82%; 3. PASOK 5.51%; 4. KKE 4.15%; 5. NA 3.29%; 6. Cosmos 3.29%; 7. MERA25 3.05%; 8. EL 2.91%; 9. Democrats 2.69%; 10. Victory 2.67%; 11. FL 1.88%; 12. PE 1.64%; 13. Others 3.74%	1. ND 68.42%; 2. SYRIZA 9.57%; 3. River 3.53%; 4. PASOK 3.22%; 5. MERA25 2.78%; 6. KKE 2.08%; 7. XA 1.86%; 8. Others 8.54%	1. ND 49.81%; 2. SYRIZA 13.19%; 3. River 8.73%; 4. XA 5.85%; 5. PASOK 5.45%; 6. DIXA–Action 3.47%; 7. KKE 2.04%; 8. DIMAR 1.81%; 9. ANEL 1.65%; 10. LAOS 1.63%; 11. EEP 1.14%; 12. Others 5.23%	1. ND 40.81%; 2. PASOK 16.95%; 3. LAOS 10.18%; 4. Action 8.91%; 5. OP 6.95%; 6. SYRIZA 6.13%; 7. KKE 3.64%; 8. PAMME 1.94%; 9. Others 2.84%	1. ND 59.96%; 2. PASOK 17.40%; 3. Coalition 7.61%; 4. LAOS 4.84%; 5. KKE 4.70%; 6. Women 1.36%; 7. OP 1.33%; 8. Others 2.80%	1. ND 34.64%; 2. PASOK 25.75%; 3. Liberals 15.68%; 4. Coalition 7.66%; 5. KKE 4.28%; 6. POLAN 3.58%; 7. PG 1.96%; 8. DIKKI 1.40%; 9. Kollatos 1.24%; 10. Others 3.81%

== Notable people ==
- Constantine II of Greece, former King of the Hellenes; also competed in the 1960 Summer Olympics in Rome, winning a gold medal.
- Princess Sophia of Greece and Denmark, later Queen Sofía of Spain, sister of Constantine II.
- Nikos Dimou, writer.
- Bobolas family, editor and co-owners of Ellaktor.
- Babis Vovos, former billionaire and owner of the construction group Babis Vovos S.A.
- George Zongolopoulos.

== Embassies and consulates ==
Psychiko is home to many embassies.

- Bulgaria
- China
- Croatia
- Czech Republic
- Georgia
- Hungary
- Indonesia
- Iran
- Iraq
- Israel
- Jordan
- Kuwait
- Lebanon
- Libya
- Morocco
- Palestine
- Philippines
- Poland
- Romania
- Russia
- Saudi Arabia
- Slovakia
- Slovenia
- Syria
- Thailand
- Tunisia
- Vatican City State
- Venezuela

=== Consulates ===
- Libya
- Poland
- Turkey

== See also ==
- List of municipalities of Attica
- General State Archives (Greece)
- Outdoor Sculpture Gallery of Psychiko
- Tourkovounia
