= Sculpture Cor-ten =

Sculpture in Thessaloniki, Greece

Coordinates: 40.6306°N 22.9539°E

The Sculpture Cor-ten or Sculpture DETH is an artwork of the Greek sculptor George Zongolopoulos that was placed to the northern entrance of the Thessaloniki International Fair (DETH) in 1966.

== History ==
The sculpture having won the first prize has been placed in 1966 in Thessaloniki after a broad architecture contest that had been proclaimed by DETH for the construction of the new gate. The 1966 was a year of significant changes for DETH that included architectural interventions on the basis of its modernization. The «Sculpture DETH» is 17m height and according to his creator it represents in an abstract way the Winged Victory of Samothrace.

The placement of the sculpture arose initially many reactions as it was quite different comparing it with the works of public art of the time in Greece. The sculpture found many defenders, between them Patroklos Karantinos, Manolis Andronikos, Dimitris Fatouros, etc. In the meantime the press of the time was divided about the new acquisition of the city. The sculpture is situated on the same spot until today and has been considered as one of the first abstract pieces of art of that size that was built in the public space in Greece.
