= Pinacotheca =

Public art gallery

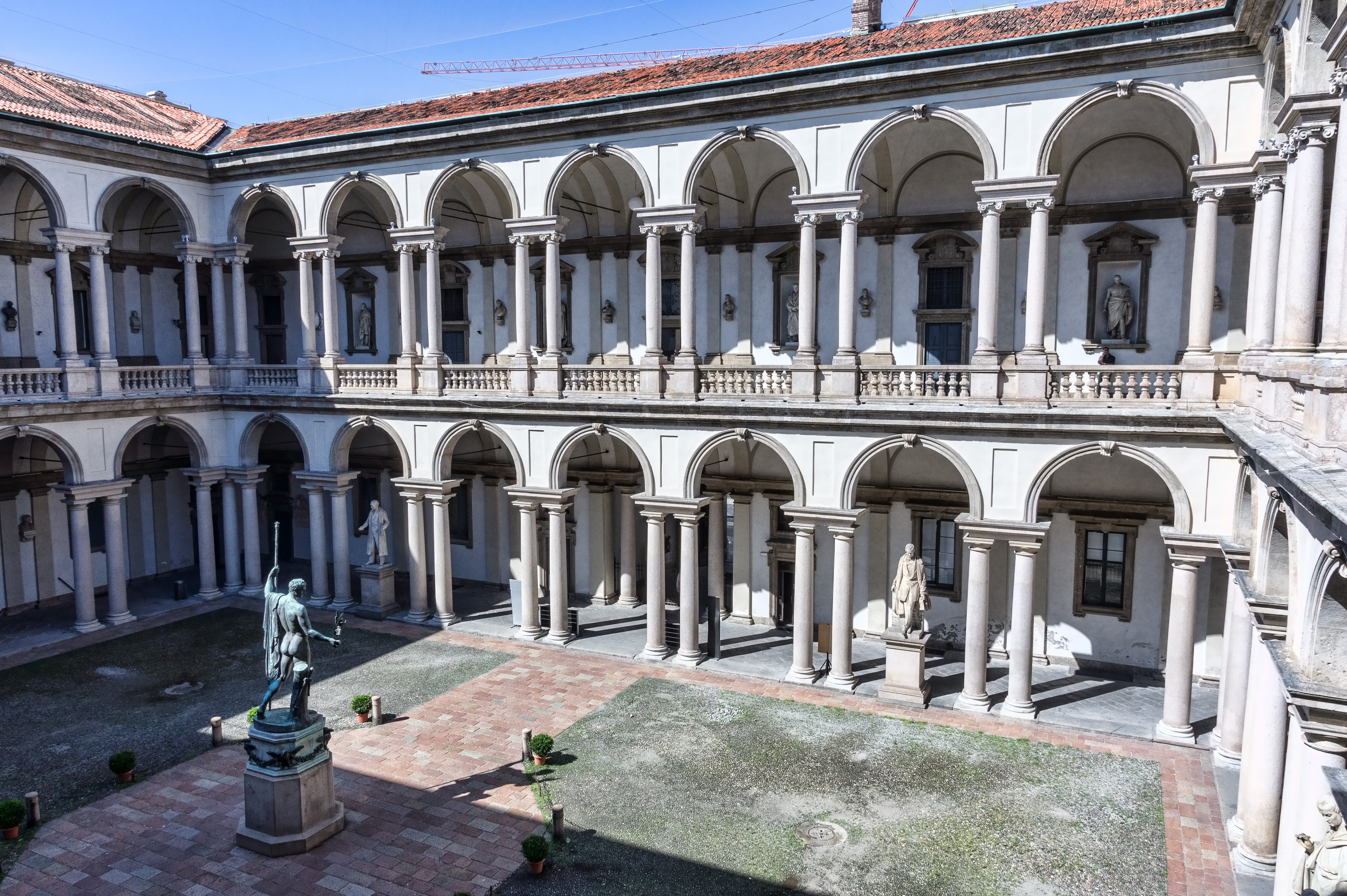
The Pinacoteca di Brera in Milan.

A pinacotheca (Latin borrowing from Ancient Greek: πινακοθήκη, romanized: pinakothēkē = πίναξ, pinax, '(painted) board, tablet' + θήκη, thēkē, 'box, chest') was a picture gallery in either ancient Greece or ancient Rome. The name is specifically used for the building containing pictures which formed the left wing of the Propylaea on the Acropolis at Athens, Greece. Though Pausanias speaks of the pictures "which time had not effaced", which seems to point to fresco painting, the fact that there is no trace of preparation for stucco on the walls implies that the paintings were easel pictures. The Romans adopted the term for the room in a private house containing pictures, statues, and other works of art.

In the modern world the word is often used as a name for a public art gallery concentrating on paintings, mostly in Italy (as "Pinacoteca"), such as the Pinacoteca Vaticana of the Vatican Museums (which is usually meant when the plain word is used), the Pinacoteca di Brera in Milan (more often "the Brera" informally), the Pinacoteca Giovanni e Marella Agnelli built on the roof of the former Lingotto Fiat factory in Turin, Italy, with others in Bologna and Siena. In Brazil, there is the Pinacoteca do Estado de São Paulo. In Paris, the Pinacothèque de Paris. In Munich the three main galleries are called the Alte Pinakothek (old masters), Neue Pinakothek (19th century) and Pinakothek der Moderne. The Pinacotheca, Melbourne, was a gallery for avant-garde art from 1967 to 2002. At Hallbergmoos, near Munich Airport, there was the Pinakothek Hallbergmoos (20th and 21st century) between 2010 and 2014.

== See also ==
- Glyptotheque
