= Neo Psychiko =

Neo Psychiko Νέο Ψυχικό
- Municipal unit
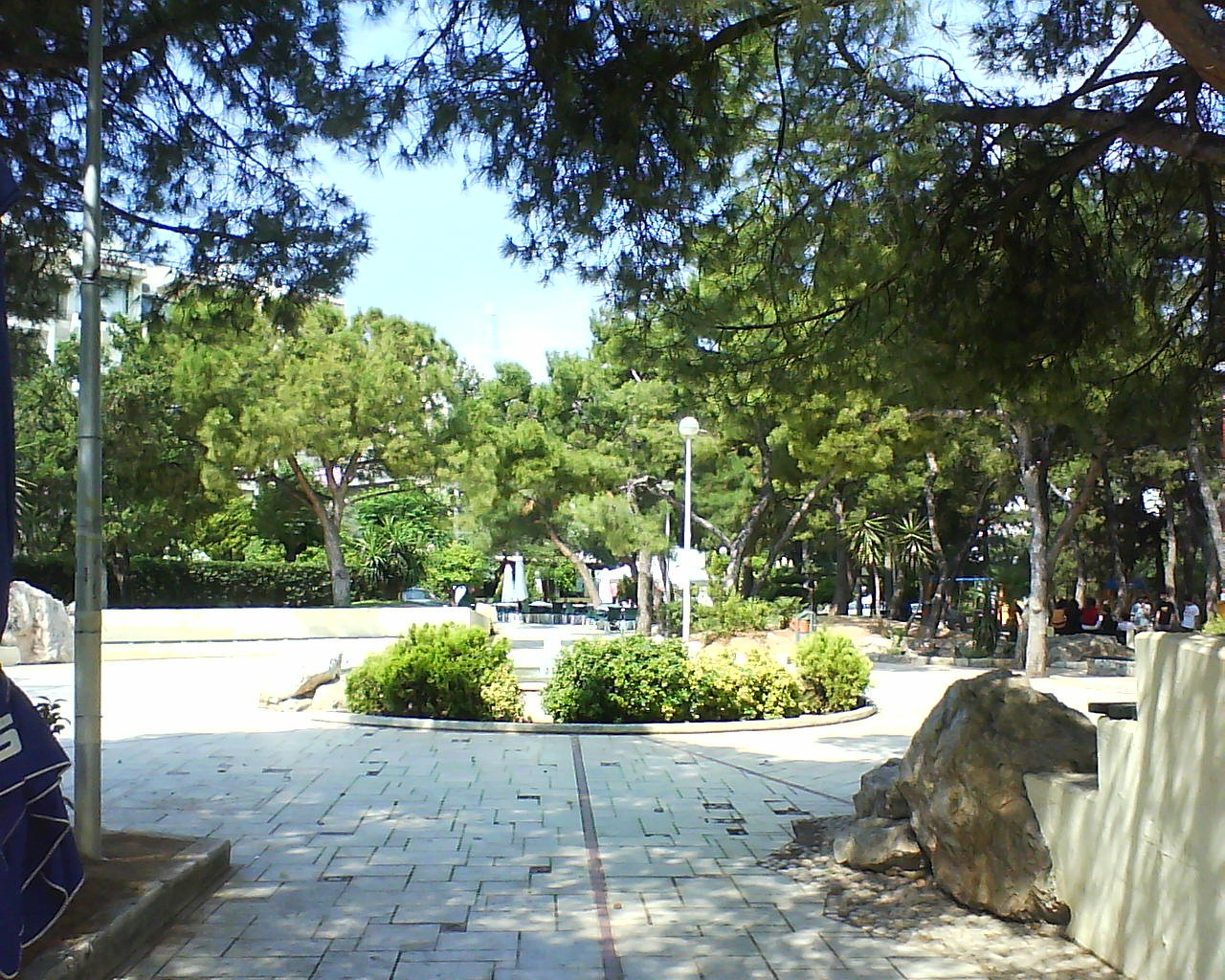
- Eleftherias Square

- Location within North Athens regional unit

- Location within Greece
- Coordinates: 38°0′N 23°47′E
- Country: Greece
- Administrative region: Attica
- Regional unit: North Athens
- Municipality: Filothei-Psychiko

Area
  - Municipal unit: 1.000 km^{2} (0.386 sq mi)
- Elevation: 170 m (560 ft)

Population (2021)
  - Municipal unit: 10,671
  - Municipal unit density: 10,670/km^{2} (27,640/sq mi)
- Time zone: UTC+2 (EET)
  - Summer (DST): UTC+3 (EEST)
- Postal code: 154 xx
- Area code: 210
- Vehicle registration: Z
- Website: www.neopsychiko.gov.gr

Neo Psychiko (Greek: Νέο Ψυχικό, romanized: Néo Psychikó) is a town and a suburb in the northeastern part of the Athens agglomeration, Greece. Since the 2011 local government reform it is part of the municipality Filothei-Psychiko, of which it is a municipal unit. The municipality has an area of 1.000 km^{2}.

== Overview ==
It is located 5 km northeast of central Athens, between Kifisias Avenue to the northwest and Mesogeion Avenue to the southeast. Formerly part of Chalandri, Neo Psychiko was recognised as a separate community in 1946 and as a municipality in July 1982.

== Historical population ==
Year	Population
1981	11,467
1991	12,023
2001	10,848
2011	10,137
2021	10,671

== See also ==
- List of municipalities of Attica
