= Voula Papaioannou =

Greek photographer

Voula Papaïoannou (1898–1990) was a Greek photographer, known for her photography of Greece, its people and its landscape.

== Biography ==
Papaïoannou was born in Lamia, Greece, but grew up in Athens. She studied at the Polytechnic University of Athens and developed an interest in photography. With the outbreak of World War II, she took up documentary photography and began to photograph and document social subjects during the duration of the German and Italian occupation of Greece. She turned her camera to troops departing for the front line, and to the casualties of war, raising awareness of the various humanitarian issues such as the Great Famine which arose out of the occupation. As Athens suffered a starvation crisis, Papaïoannou photographed emaciated children, providing an account of the horrors of war on the civilian population.

After the liberation, Papaïoannou became a member of the photographic unit of the UNRRA (United Nations Relief and Rehabilitation Administration), touring the Greek countryside recording the hard conditions of rural life. Papaïoannou's attention toward the hardships of the Greek population was not in the least romantic or touristic, but instead honestly portrayed them as proud and independent, optimistic for the future despite poverty.

== Photography ==
Papaïoannou worked in the social documentarian tradition of photography. Her work reflects the dominant representational paradigm of 'humanist photography' prominent in postwar Europe. Her work was widely printed in the photographic press, and was published in book form through the Swiss publisher La Guilde du Livre in the 1950s.

== Books ==
- 1953. La Grèce : à ciel ouvert (Lausanne: La Guilde du Livre), in French. OCLC 6108947.
- 1956. Iles Grecques (Lausanne: La Guilde du Livre), in French. OCLC 715705475.
