= Glyptotheque =

Collection of sculptures

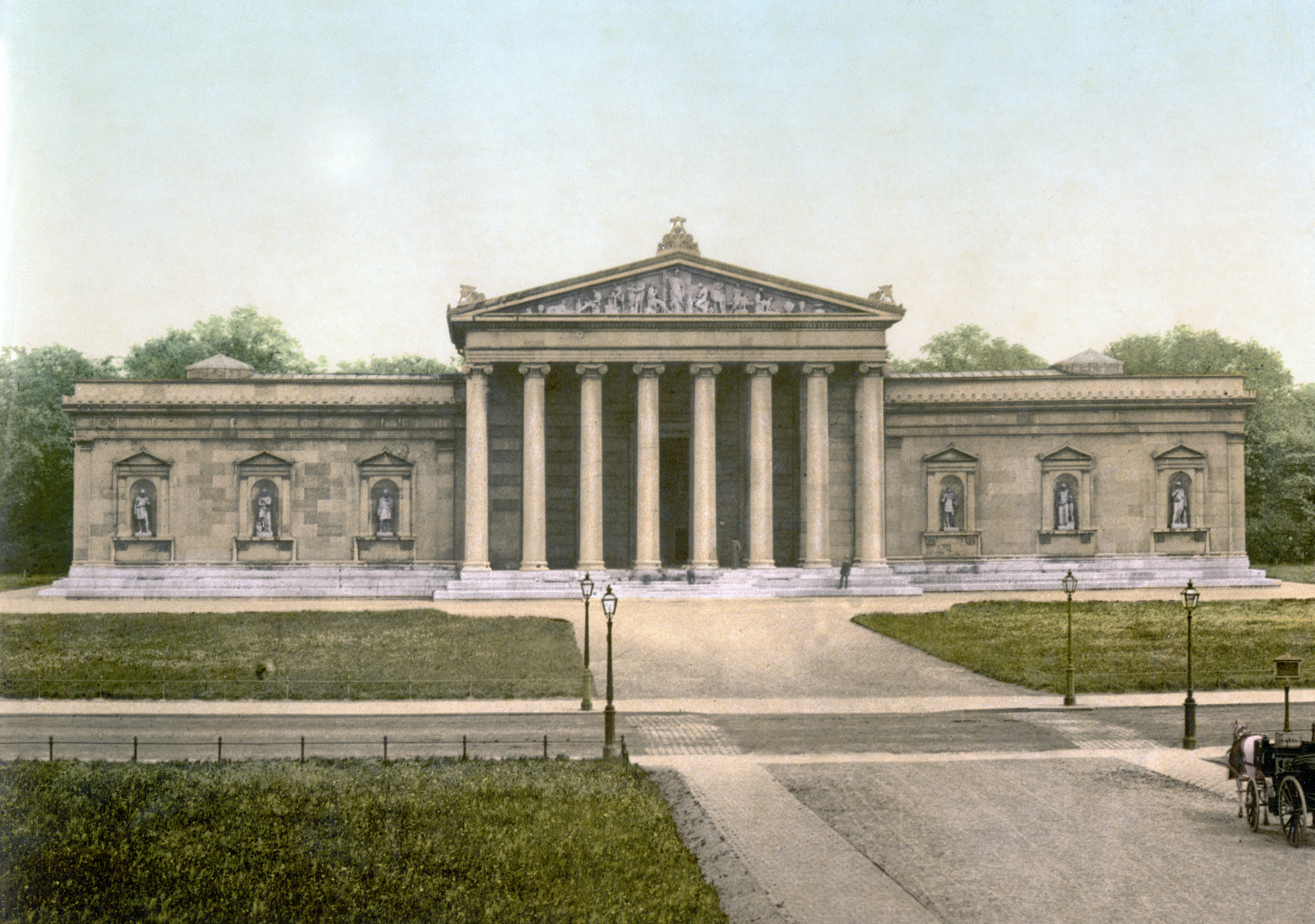
Munich Glyptothek, c. 1900

A glyptotheque is a collection of sculptures. It is part of the name of several museums and art galleries.

The designation glyptotheque was coined by the librarian of King Ludwig I of Bavaria, derived from the Ancient Greek verb glyphein (γλύφειν), meaning "cut into stone". It was an allusion to the word pinacotheca (from πίναξ pinax, "panel" or "painting"). Glypton (γλυπτόν) is the Greek word for a sculpture.

Museums that today bear this name or cognates of it include:

- Glyptothek, in Munich, Germany
- Ny Carlsberg Glyptotek, in Copenhagen, Denmark
- National Glyptotheque, in Athens, Greece
- Gliptoteka, in Zagreb, Croatia

== See also ==
- Lapidarium
