= Filothei-Psychiko =

Filothei-Psychiko Φιλοθέη-Ψυχικό
- Municipality
- Seal

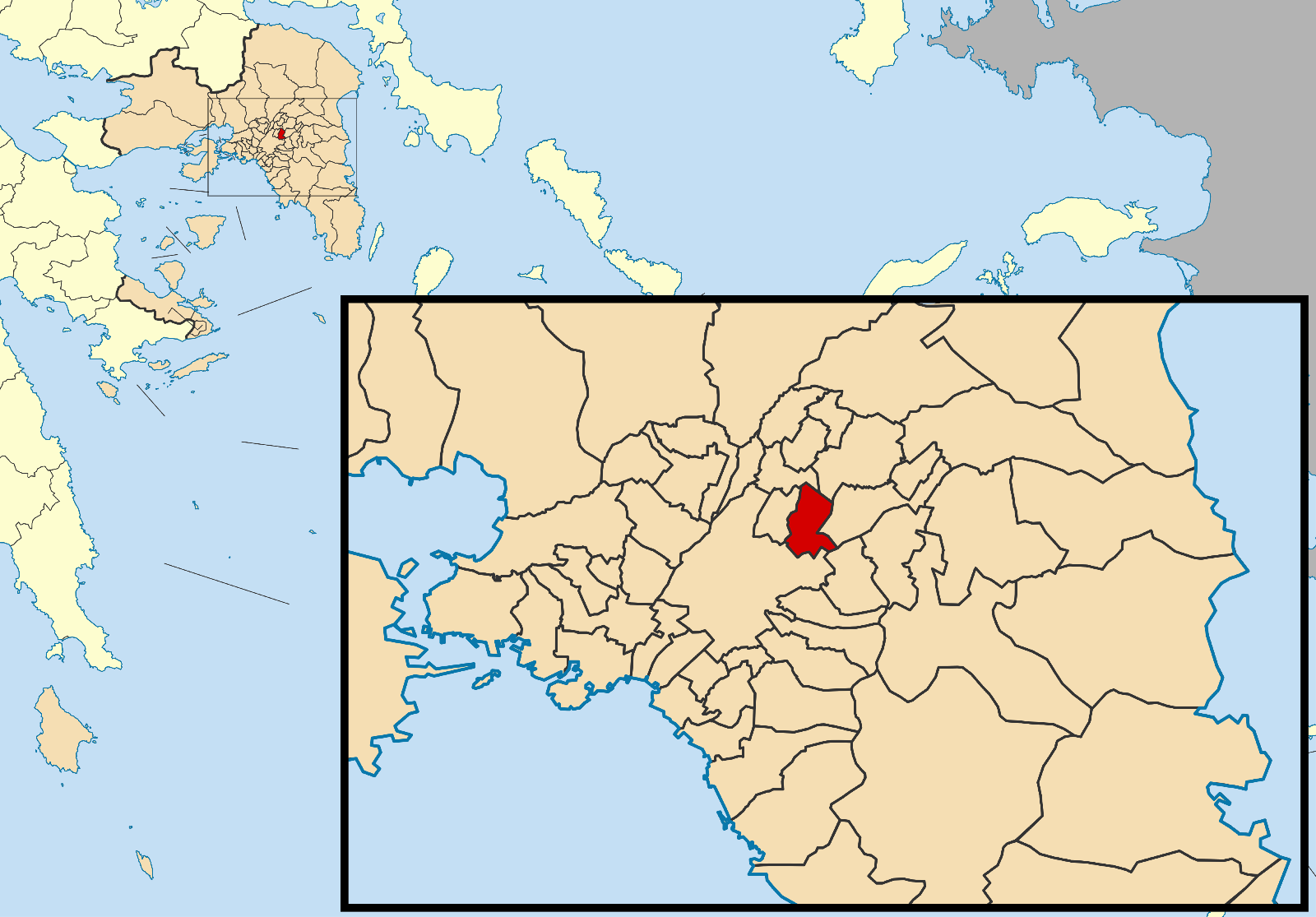

- Location within Greece
- Coordinates: 38°01′N 23°46′E
- Country: Greece
- Administrative region: Attica
- Regional unit: North Athens

Government
  - Mayor: Charalampos Bonatsos (since 2023)

Area
  - Municipality: 6.077 km^{2} (2.346 sq mi)

Population (2021)
  - Municipality: 27,636
  - Density: 4,548/km^{2} (11,780/sq mi)
- Time zone: UTC+2 (EET)
  - Summer (DST): UTC+3 (EEST)
- Vehicle registration: Ζ
- Website: philothei-psychiko.gov.gr

Filothei–Psychiko (Greek: Φιλοθέη-Ψυχικό) is a municipality in the North Athens regional unit, Attica, Greece. The seat of the municipality is the town Psychiko.

== Municipality ==
The municipality Filothei–Psychiko was formed at the 2011 local government reform by the merger of the following 3 former municipalities, that became municipal units:

- Filothei
- Neo Psychiko
- Psychiko

The municipality has an area of 6.077 km^{2}.
