= George Zongolopoulos =

Greek sculptor, painter and architect

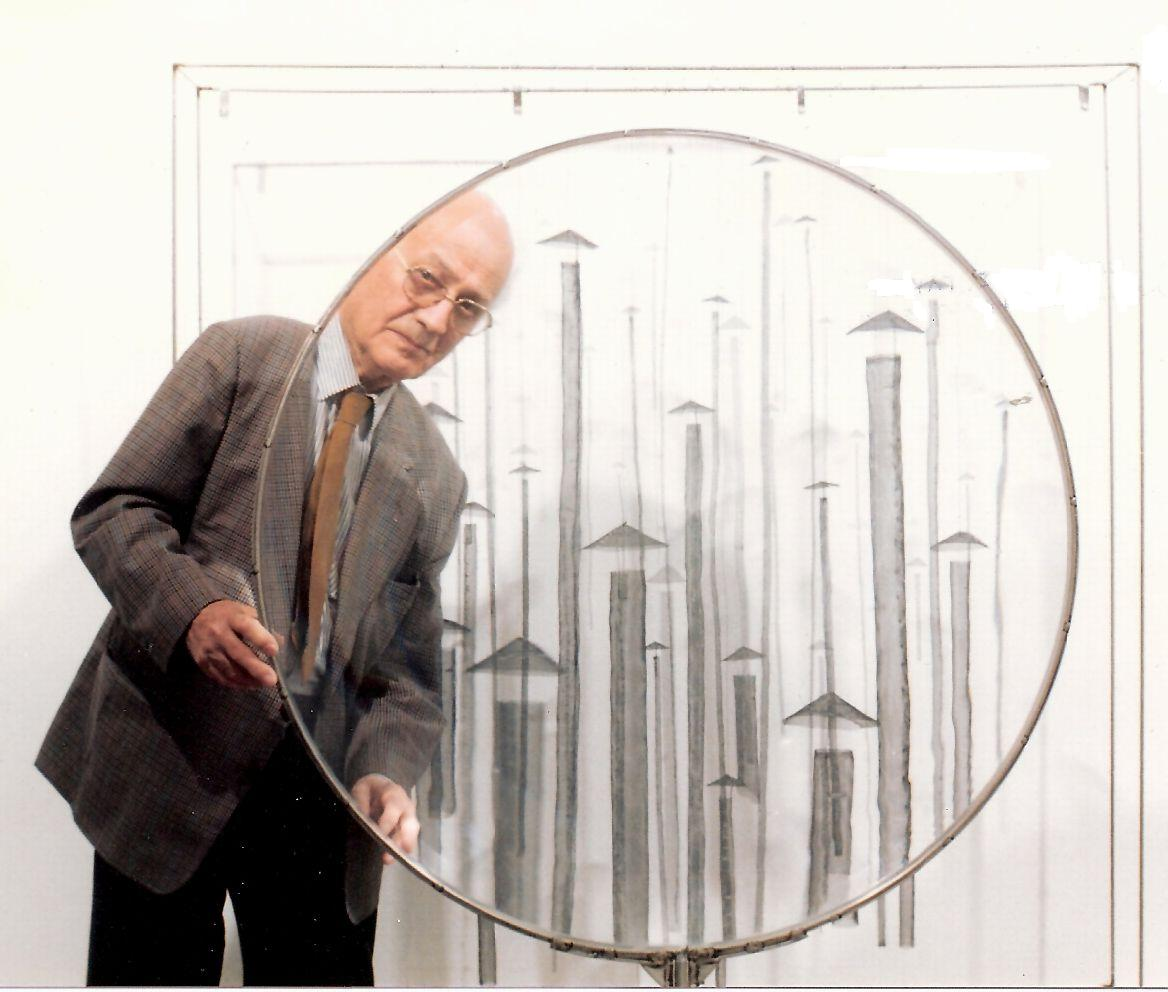
- Zongolopoulos in 1990
- Born: Georgios Zongolopoulos; 1 March 1903; Athens, Greece
- Died: 11 May 2004 (aged 101); Athens, Greece
- Known for: sculptor, architect and painter

George Zongolopoulos (Greek: Γιώργος Ζογγολόπουλος (1 March 1903, Athens – 11 May 2004, Athens)) was a Greek sculptor, painter and architect. Zongolopoulos, who was often called the “eternal teenager” was a representative of the so-called “Generation of 1930s” while his work extends from the 1920s until his late life.

== Biography ==
=== Early years and studies ===
Zongolopoulos was born on 1 March 1903, in Omonoia, Athens. His family hailed from Markasi (nowadays Manna) in Corinthia. Since his childhood, Zongolopoulos showed a talent in art and some years later (1924), after the end of his military service (where he became associated with Patroklos Karantinos) and despite the fact that his family did not encourage him to follow an artistic career he entered the Athens School of Fine Arts where he studied sculpture under Thomas Thomopoulos.

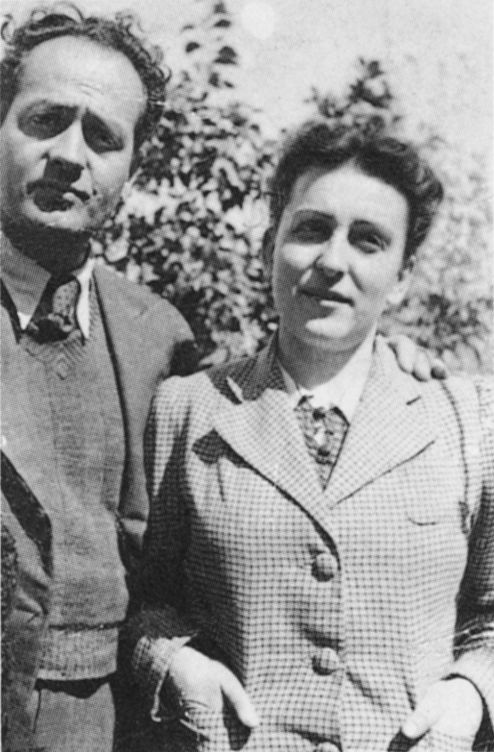
George and Eleni Zongolopoulos in 1937.

During his years in School of Fine Arts he became a persistent supporter of the demands for modernisation and reorganisation of the School as also for the need of a higher budget for School's operation. Because of his views and attitude, Zongolopoulos was expelled from School in 1929. His suspension ended a year later, after the intervention of the famous poet Ioannis Griparis. Zongolopoulos, along with other fellow students, had a significant contribution in the appointment of Konstantinos Parthenis (a major representative of modernism in Greek art) as a teacher in the School of Fine Arts.

From 1926 to 1928 Zongolopoulos worked as an assistant of the renowned architect Anastasios Orlandos in the Department of Restoration of Ancient and Byzantine Monuments of the Greek ministry of Education. His spell under Orlandos was his first step in his occupation with architecture, which later became a major part of his artistic career.

=== Early artistic career ===
After his graduation from the School of Fine Arts, Zongolopoulos returned to his work as an architect in the Ministry of Education. In 1931 Zongolopoulos took part as a sculptor in the remodeling of Omonoia square in Athens while the following year he joined the art group Ομάδα Τέχνη (Group Art), a group founded for the development of modernism in Greek art. As a member of Ομάδα Τέχνη, he participated in various group exhibitions along with fellow artists like Spyros Vassiliou, Aginor Asteriadis, Dimitris Vitsoris etc.

In 1938, after his return from Paris, where he went with his wife in order to attend the International Fair and an exhibition dedicated to El Greco, he resigned from his position in the ministry in order to devote himself to sculpture. The same year he participated in the first Hellenic National Art Exhibition. Throughout that decade, his works and his abilities received positive reviews by critics such as Kalligas, Koukoulas and Kokkinos.

In 1940, Zongolopoulos' work was exposed in the Greek pavilion during Venice Biennale. During the Axis occupation of Greece, Zongolopoulos struggled against many difficulties. On the other hand, he tried to secure other artists' needs by proposing the creation of a mess hall under the authorisation of Ministry of Culture.

=== Late 1940s ===
After the war was over, Zongolopoulos continued his artistic activities; in 1946 he participated in various arts festivals (the Cairo Biennale, the Greek art exhibition in Stockholm and an exhibition of the members of the Greek-French School of Athens). The same year he was elected president of the association of Greek Sculptors and vice president of the Chamber of Fine Arts of Greece. In 1948 he organised his first solo exhibition in Athens. He also participated in Hellenic National Art Exhibition where he was honoured with a silver medal for his plaster-made sculpture, depicting Ariadne.

=== 1950s ===
In 1949 Zongolopoulos was granted a scholarship by the French government. As a result, he moved to Paris and he studied under Marcel Gimond. Moreover, he collaborated with the architect René Binet. In 1953 he moved to Italy under a scholarship from the Greek state. During his stay in Italy, he studied bronze-casting techniques and also the work of major Italian artists. The same year he joined the European Culture Society. During the period of his accommodation outside Greece, Zongolopoulos made a switch from realism to abstraction. In 1957 he participated in São Paulo Art Biennial. The following year, Zongolopoulos along with the architect Kostas Bitsios, won the contest for the remodeling of Omonoia square.

Some of Zongolopoulos' notable works during the 1950s are the monuments of the fallen of Zalongo (15 metres high and 18 metres long) in Epirus and Kokkinia in Nikaia, Piraeus.

=== Geometric period ===
During the 1960s, Zongolopoulos gave emphasis on geometrical forms. He also introduced a number of artworks made of bronze that are known for their architectural structure based on plates which were placed due to welding methods.

In 1960, he participated along with other Greek artists (including his wife Eleni) at the Salon de l'art libre of Paris. The same year he received the second prize for his study in the national contest for the construction of a monument in memory of the victims of Kalavryta's massacre while he served as an executive member of the European Culture Society from 1960 till 1968. Moreover, Zongolopoulos was a regular columnist of society's magazine Comprendre.

In 1964 Zongolopoulos participated in the Venice Biennale. For his participation, he created an abstract bronze sculpture under the name Delphi, which was bought later by the municipality of Athens and it is located since 1989 in a major city's avenue close to the building of the National Gallery of Greece.

The following year, Zongolopoulos made his inaugural appearance in Salon de la jeune sculpture exhibition while in 1966 he won the first prize in the contest of Thessaloniki International Fair thanks to his sculpture Cor-ten, a 17-metre-high artwork that according to its creator is an abstract representation of Nike of Samothrace. which is placed at the north entrance of the exhibition's site. The same year he was honoured by king Constantine for his contribution in Greek Art but he kindly avoided to attend the reception and to receive the medal.

=== Kinetic art and transparency of the media ===
In 1971 Zongolopoulos made an impact in Greek Art by becoming one of the first Greek artists who adopted and introduced kinetic art in Greece. A major factor during Zongolopoulos occupation with that genre was the usage of water power and light in his creations, which were mostly created with stainless steel. The same year he acquired an atelier in Paris which was used by Zongolopoulos as a base for his activities in France etc. (Zongolopoulos and his wife used to spend almost half of a year in Paris in order to attend or participate in various events for about a decade).

In 1973 Zongolopoulos created a 10 metres height sculpture under the name Diaphragm or Panels of Merlin which was placed the same year in Kolonaki, Athens, at the headquarters of a major insurance company. The same period (1970s) Zongolopoulos created a series of artworks (like The Gifts, The Egg, Lens & Nest, etc.) with symbolic content using magnifying lenses in order to achieve visual tricks.

In 1974, he was among the artists that during the campaign before the referendum for the form of government supported the abolition of monarchy in Greece. In 1977 Zongolopoulos got a retirement pension from the Greek state as a recognition for his attribution in Art. The following years (1978/1979) he participated in a group exhibition of 22 Greek painters and sculptors at Grand Palais complex in Paris. The same period he also organised solo exhibitions in Athens, where he presented various artworks throughout his career, Thessaloniki and Paris (at Grands et Jeunes d`Aujourd Hui).

=== 1980s ===
During the 80s Zongolopoulos was distinguished for his proposals along with the prominent architect Alexandros Tombazis for the remodeling of Klafthmonos square in Athens and the construction of the Greek Resistance monument in Gorgopotamos. Although both his proposals were awarded by winning first prizes in national competitions, finally none of them was materialised.

=== Umbrellas ===
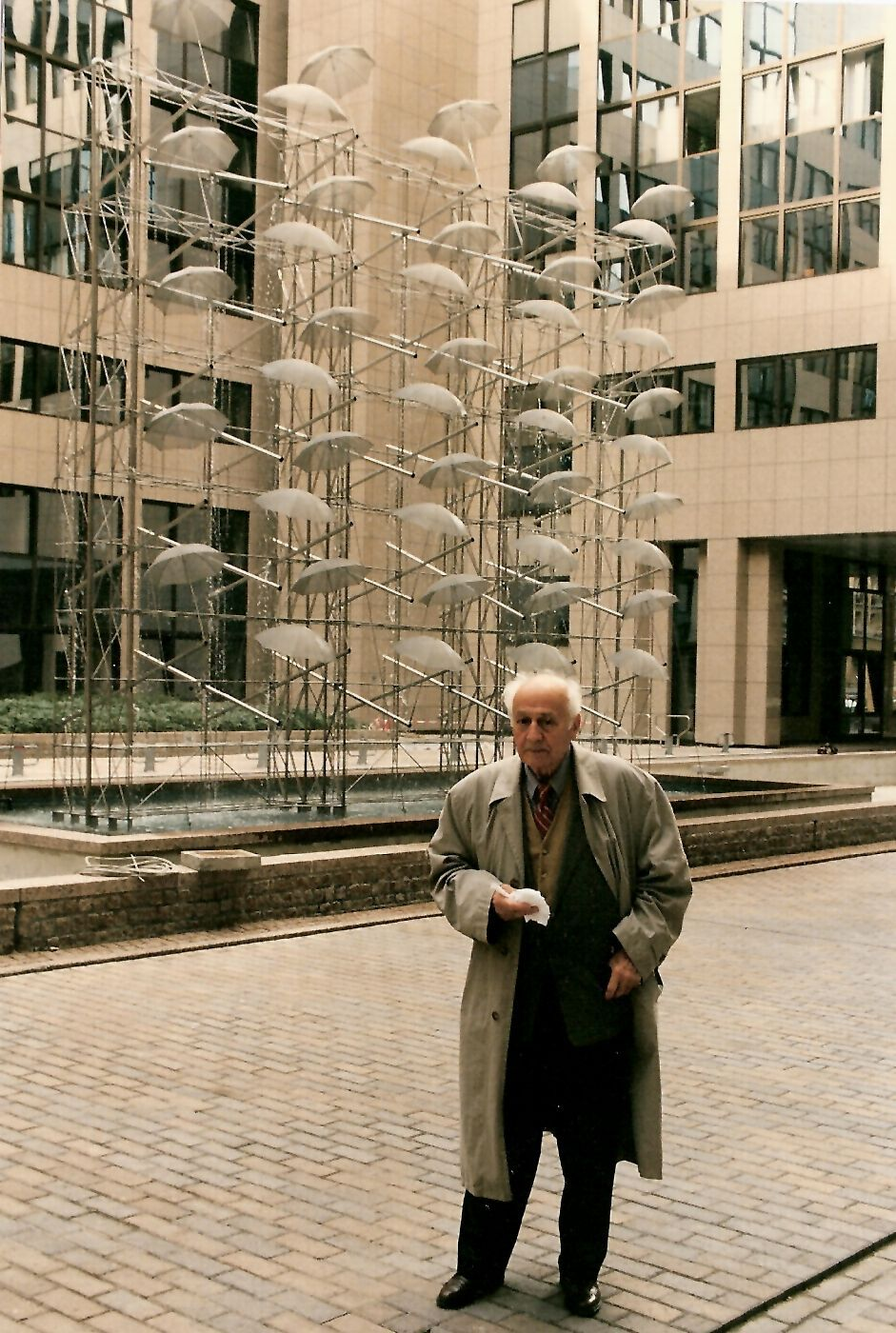
Zongolopoulos in front of his artwork Umbrellas in Brussels

In 1988 Zongolopoulos introduced to the audience his signature artwork Umbrellas, a theme repeated the following years. Moreover, in 1993 he presented a solo exhibition during that year's Venice Biennale where his most remarkable exhibit was a hydrokinetic version of his Umbrellas series while two years later he was praised for another Umbrellas version consisting of a static group of floating umbrellas based on diagonal axes. Furthermore, the sculpture was placed at the exhibition's entrance thus gaining recognition and publicity. The same year Zongolopoulos won the first place at the competition held for the installation of European artworks at the Council of the European Union's building in Brussels and thus his hydrokenetic work Umbrellas was placed at building's Cour d'honneur.

Sculptures of Zongolopoulos Umbrellas are also placed in Thessaloniki (in Thessaloniki's new seaside and outside Macedonian Museum of Contemporary Art) and Palaio Psychiko, where the artist is also commemorated by the sculpture park, or glyptotheque, named after him.

Zongolopoulos' Umbrellas sculpture in Thessaloniki has become one of the city's most important landmarks and is now, according to Nicos Theodoridis, head of the George Zongolopoulos Foundation, the most important point of reference for contemporary art in the public space of Greece.

=== Other artworks ===
In 1997 Zongolopoulos created Tel - Néant, an artwork made by stainless steel and plexiglas presented in that year's Venice Biennale and in 1999 exhibitions held in Berlin (Wittenbergplatz) and Weimar. Nowadays the sculpture is placed at OTE headquarters in Athens. In 1998, Zongolopoulos created another sculpture from stainless steel under the name Composition of Circles or Olympic Circles as a reference to the Olympic rings while the following year he created Column, a 21 m. high artwork presented at 1999 Venice Biennale and placed later near Evangelismos metro station, Athens. In 2001 Zongolopoulos made his last artwork, a stainless steel sculpture known as Irana (a name taken by its creator from the Dorian Greek form of the name Irene).

Zongolopoulos artworks are exhibited at the National Gallery and the National Glyptotheque of Greece, as well as the Open Air Glyptotheque of Psychiko (on Zongolopoulos Square), the MOMus–Museum of Contemporary Art, the Teloglion Foundation of Arts and more.

Zongolopoulos died on 11 May 2004. He was buried at Kifissia's cemetery.

=== George Zongolopoulos Foundation ===
The George Zongolopoulos Foundation is a public benefit non-profit organization established in February 2004 by the artist. Zongolopoulos bequeathed to the Foundation his entire collection of works by himself and Eleni. He also provided his entire archive, with sketches, drawings, articles and audio-visual material. The Foundation is managed by a six-member Board of Directors with headquarters in the former residence of the sculptor in Psychiko.

== Personal life ==
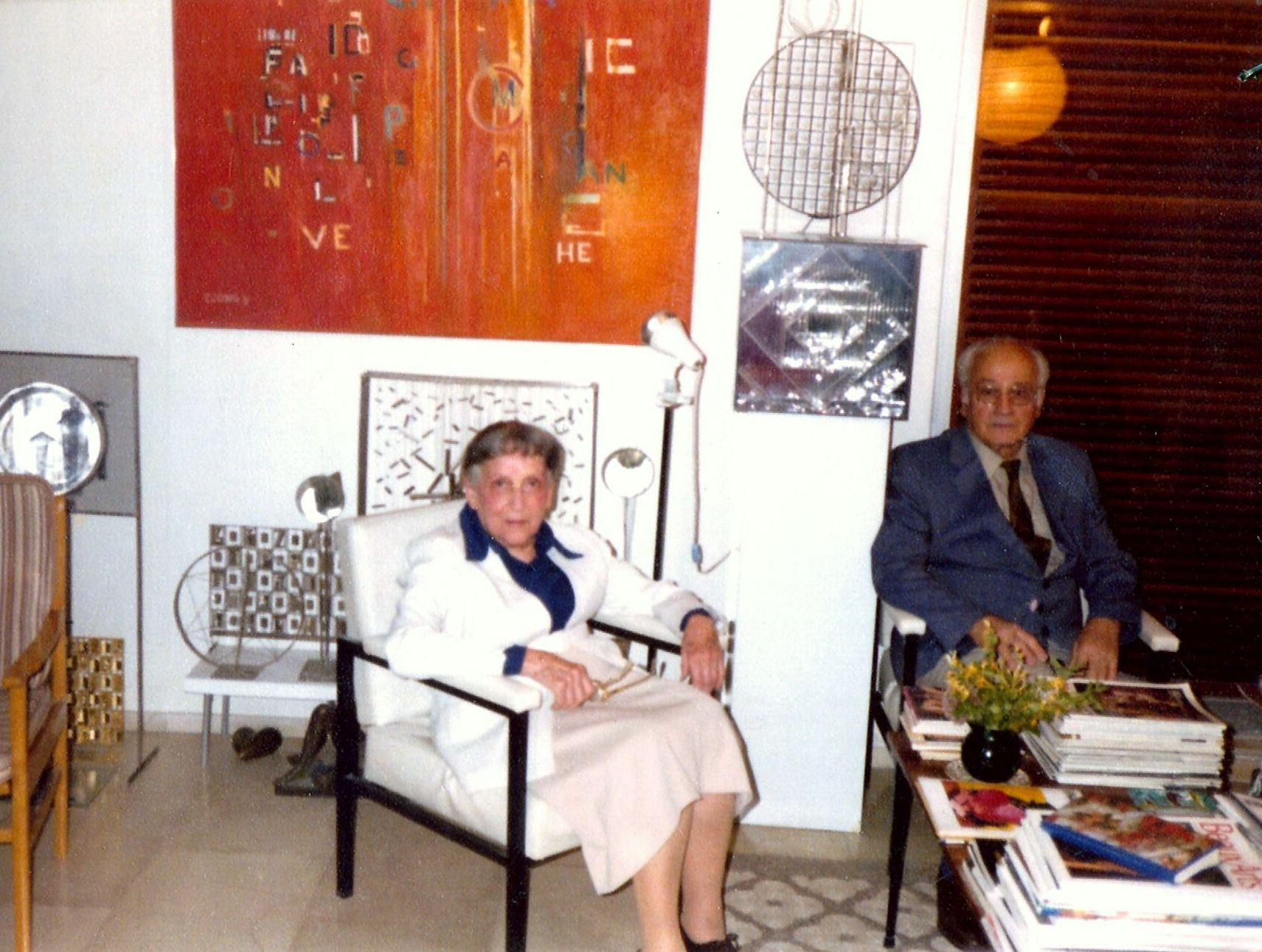
George and Eleni Zongolopoulos (1987)

In 1933 Zongolopoulos met Eleni Paschalidou, a Greek from Moda region of Kadıköy in Istanbul who was a painter and student of Konstantinos Parthenis. They were married in 1936 and they lived together in the Athenian suburb of Psychiko until Eleni's death in 1991.

According to Zongolopoulos himself, his wife was the most important thing I've had in the world. Although the couple was married for almost 60 years they were childless by their own choice.
