= Filothei =

Filothei Φιλοθέη
- Municipal unit
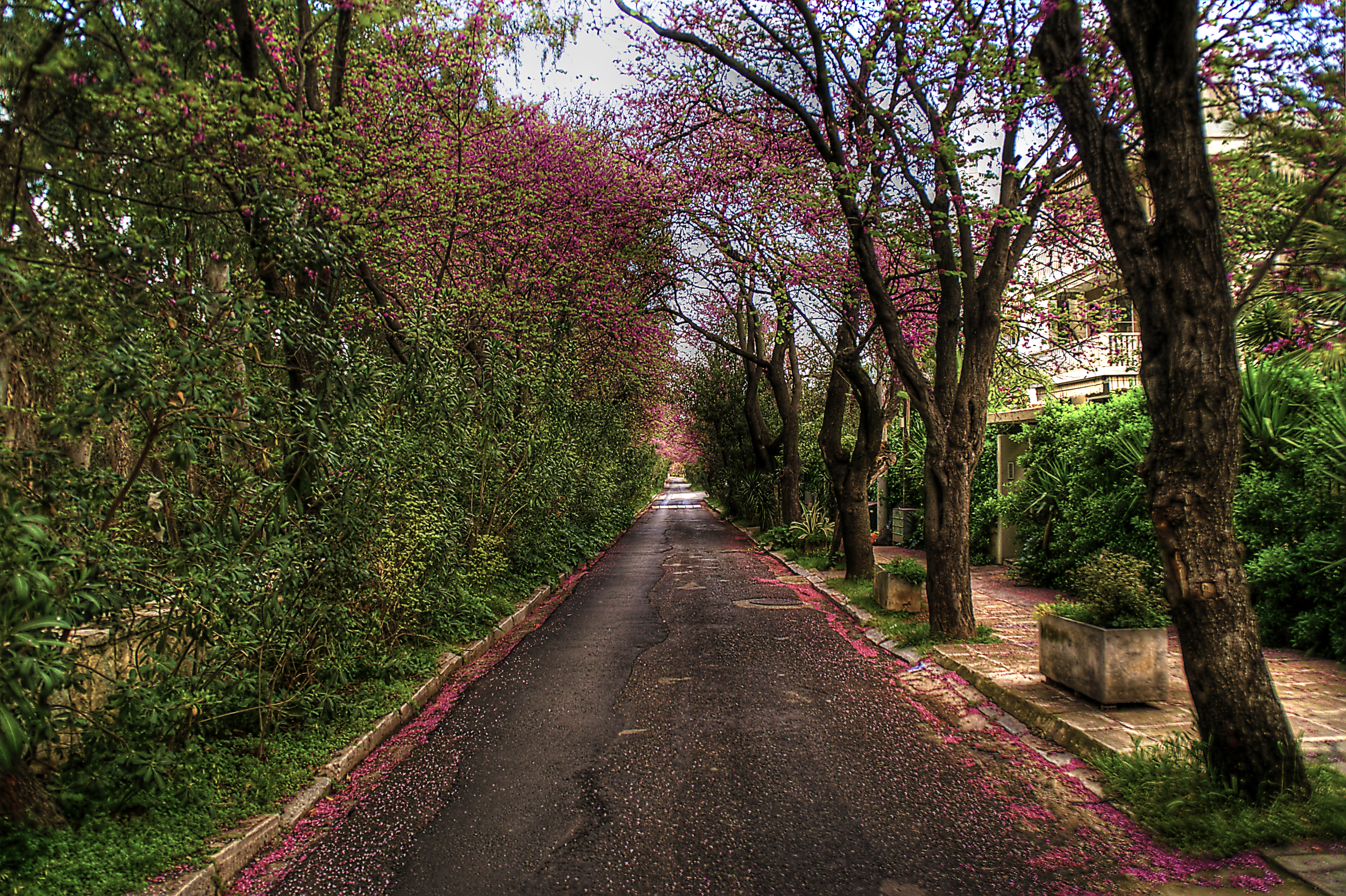
- Spring 2009 in G Ventiri street.

- Location within North Athens regional unit

- Location within Greece
- Coordinates: 38°1′N 23°47′E
- Country: Greece
- Administrative region: Attica
- Regional unit: North Athens
- Municipality: Filothei-Psychiko

Area
  - Municipal unit: 2.301 km^{2} (0.888 sq mi)
- Elevation: 160 m (520 ft)

Population (2021)
  - Municipal unit: 7,370
  - Municipal unit density: 3,200/km^{2} (8,300/sq mi)
- Time zone: UTC+2 (EET)
  - Summer (DST): UTC+3 (EEST)
- Postal code: 152 xx
- Area code: 210
- Vehicle registration: Z
- Website: philothei.ichscommunication.gr

Filothei (Greek: Φιλοθέη) is a green, affluent northeastern suburban town in the Athens agglomeration, Greece, consisting mainly of hillside villas, relatively close to the Olympic Stadium in the nearby town of Marousi. Since the 2011 local government reform it is part of the municipality Filothei-Psychiko, of which it is a municipal unit. The municipal unit has an area of 2.301 km^{2}.

== Overview ==
One of the traditionally rich northern suburbs of Athens, Filothei has been historically home to important people such as politicians and businessmen; it is also home to many of Athens' foreign residents, especially those employed in diplomatic capacities. Filothei is also home to numerous foreign embassies.

== Climate ==
Filothei has a hot-summer Mediterranean climate (Köppen climate classification: Csa) with mild winters and hot summers. Most precipitation falls during the autumn and winter while summers are dry and arid.

Climate data for Filothei 160 m a.s.l.
Month	Jan	Feb	Mar	Apr	May	Jun	Jul	Aug	Sep	Oct	Nov	Dec	Year
Record high °C (°F)	23.7 (74.7)	25.1 (77.2)	28.6 (83.5)	32.4 (90.3)	40.9 (105.6)	44.5 (112.1)	44.6 (112.3)	46.1 (115.0)	40.6 (105.1)	34.4 (93.9)	28.4 (83.1)	21.7 (71.1)	46.1 (115.0)
Mean daily maximum °C (°F)	13.8 (56.8)	15.5 (59.9)	18.4 (65.1)	23.1 (73.6)	27.6 (81.7)	32.4 (90.3)	34.7 (94.5)	34.3 (93.7)	30.2 (86.4)	24.6 (76.3)	19.4 (66.9)	15.1 (59.2)	24.1 (75.4)
Daily mean °C (°F)	10.1 (50.2)	11.4 (52.5)	13.8 (56.8)	17.7 (63.9)	22.1 (71.8)	26.8 (80.2)	29.5 (85.1)	29.2 (84.6)	25.1 (77.2)	20.0 (68.0)	15.6 (60.1)	11.6 (52.9)	19.4 (66.9)
Mean daily minimum °C (°F)	6.5 (43.7)	7.4 (45.3)	9.2 (48.6)	12.3 (54.1)	16.6 (61.9)	21.1 (70.0)	24.2 (75.6)	24.1 (75.4)	20.0 (68.0)	15.5 (59.9)	11.7 (53.1)	8.1 (46.6)	14.7 (58.5)
Record low °C (°F)	−1.9 (28.6)	−0.5 (31.1)	−0.2 (31.6)	4.1 (39.4)	11.1 (52.0)	13.4 (56.1)	17.3 (63.1)	19.7 (67.5)	12.4 (54.3)	7.6 (45.7)	4.4 (39.9)	1.0 (33.8)	−1.9 (28.6)
Average rainfall mm (inches)	69.2 (2.72)	36.4 (1.43)	38.0 (1.50)	23.2 (0.91)	14.3 (0.56)	23.9 (0.94)	9.0 (0.35)	5.3 (0.21)	36.8 (1.45)	26.3 (1.04)	52.0 (2.05)	71.0 (2.80)	405.4 (15.96)
Source: Davis WeatherLink Network (Jan 2014-Mar 2025)

== Historical population ==
Year	Population
1981	6,749
1991	8,396
2001	7,310
2011	7,302
2021	7,370
